= Nanping–Longyan railway =

Railway line in China

Nanping-Longyan Railway
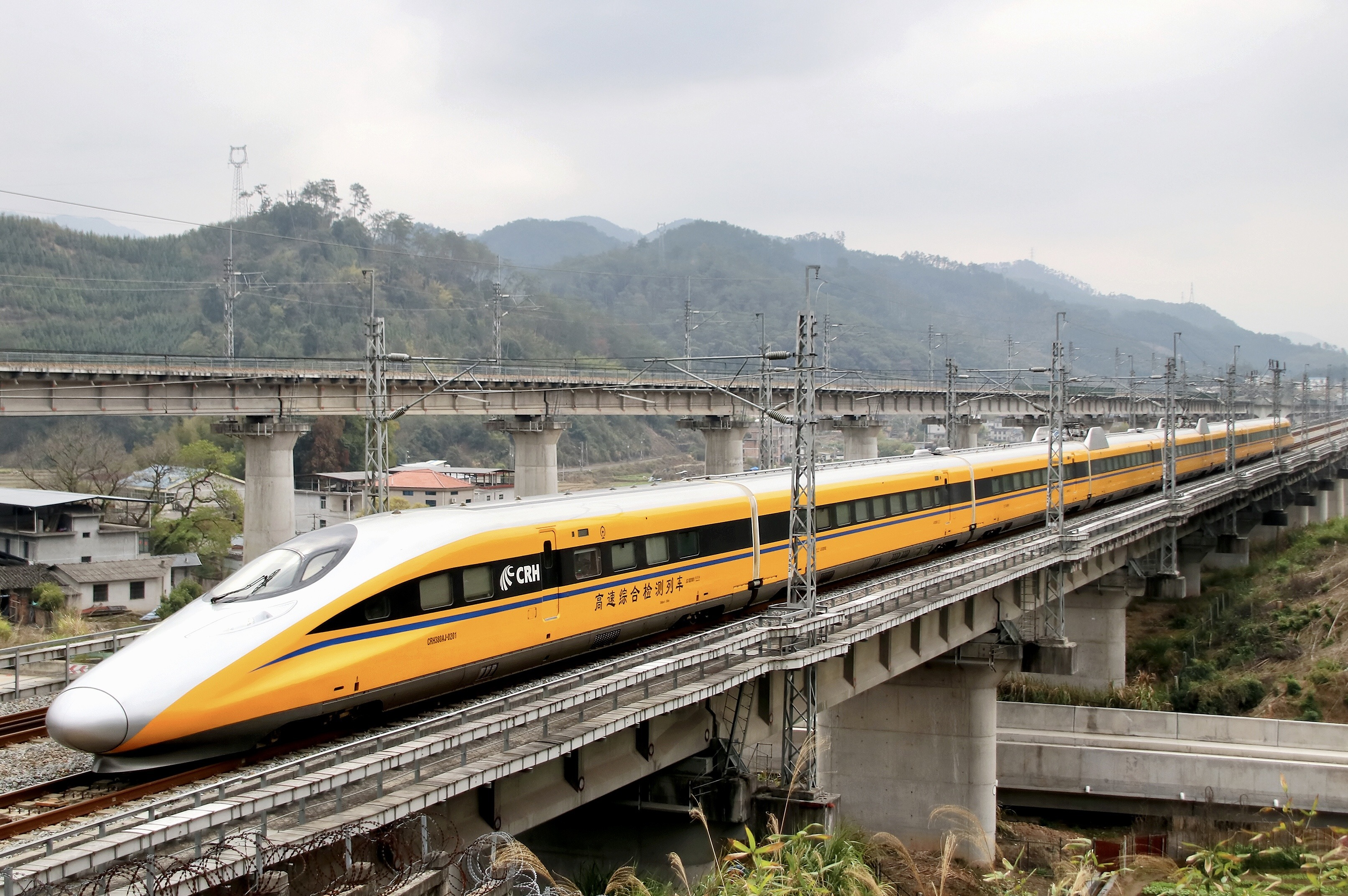
- CRH380AJ inspection train departs Yong'an South Railway Station

Overview
- Owner: CR Nanchang
- Locale: Fujian Province
- Termini: Yanping; Longyan
- Stations: 9

Service
- Type: High-speed rail; Inter-city rail
- System: China Railway High-speed
- Operator: CR Nanchang

History
- Opened: 2018

Technical
- Line length: 248.1 kilometres (154.2 mi)
- Number of tracks: 2
- Track gauge: 4 ft 8 1/2 in (1,435 mm) standard gauge
- Electrification: Overhead line, 25 kV 50 Hz AC
- Operating speed: 200 km/h (120 mph)

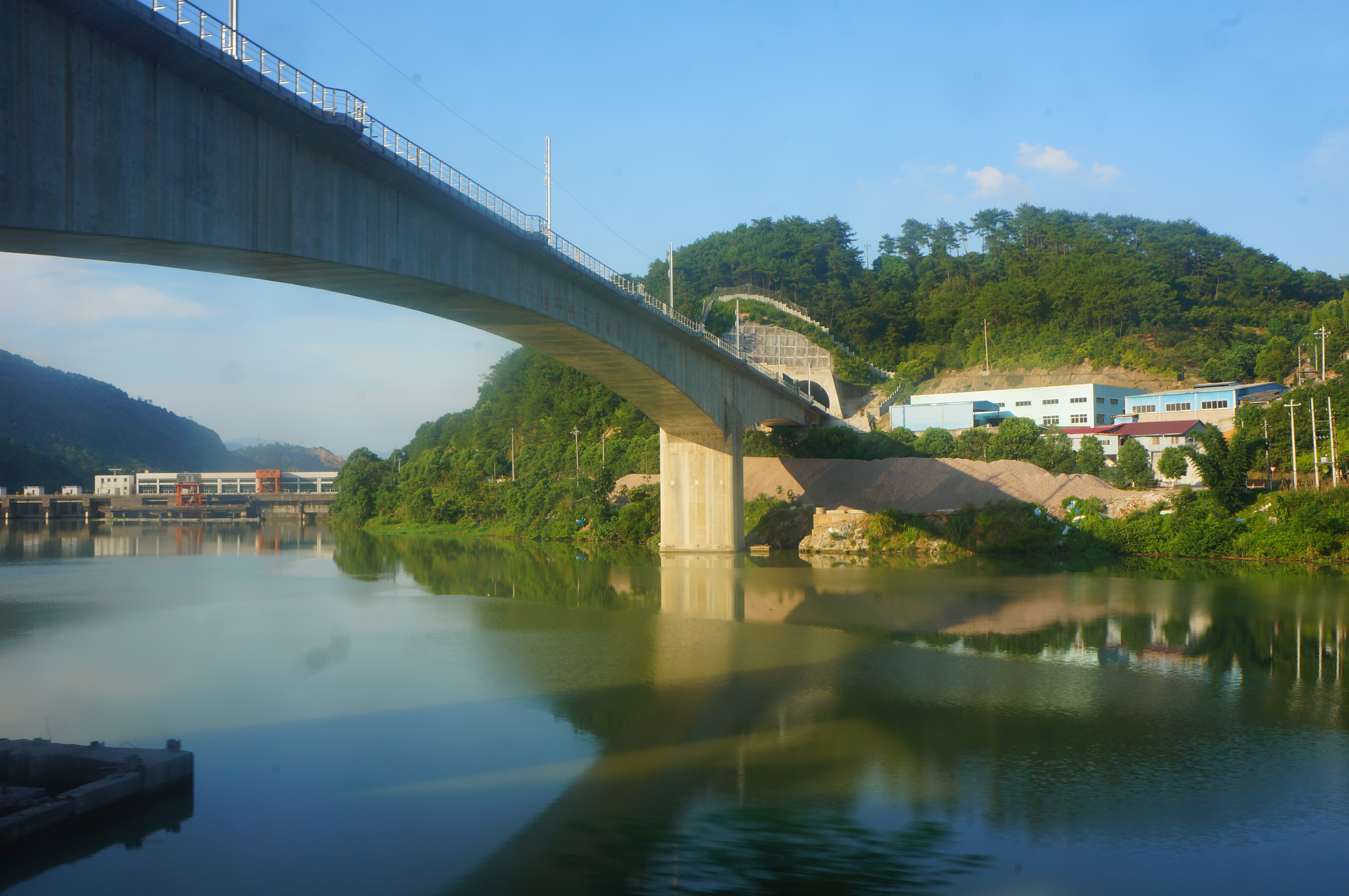
Nanping-Longyang Railway over Shaxi River near Sha County, China

The Nanping–Longyan railway (Chinese: 南龙铁路; pinyin: Nán-Lóng tiělù) is a high-speed railway located in Fujian Province, China.

== History ==
The railway opened on 29 December 2018.

== Specification ==
The line is 248.1 kilometres (154.2 mi) long and has a maximum speed of 200 kilometers per hour (125 mph). It has nine stations:

- Yanping (interchange with the Hefei–Fuzhou high-speed railway)
- Yanping West (interchange with the Nanping–Fuzhou railway)
- Sanming North (interchange with the Yingtan–Xiamen railway and Xiangtang–Putian railway)
- Sanming
- Yong'an South (interchange with the Yingtan–Xiamen railway)
- Shuangyang
- Zhangping West
- Yanshi South
- Longyan (interchange with the Zhangping–Longchuan railway, Ganzhou–Longyan railway, and Longyan–Xiamen railway)

== Incidents ==
During the line's construction on March 15, 2015, an explosion occurred in the Qianshan No. 2 incline shaft in Zhongping Village, Nanping City, resulting in the death of 2 construction workers, with a further 7 workers injured.
