= Quanzhou–Xiamen–Zhangzhou Intercity Railway Line =

Quanzhou–Xiamen–Zhangzhou Intercity Railway Line R1

Overview
- Native name: 泉州至厦门至漳州城际铁路R1线
- Status: Approved
- Termini: Quanzhou East railway station; Jintang Station
- Stations: 29

Service
- Type: Commuter rail

History
- Planned opening: 2031

Technical
- Line length: 71.55 km (44.46 mi)
- Character: Underground and Elevated
- Operating speed: 160 km/h (99 mph)

The Quanzhou–Xiamen–Zhangzhou Intercity Railway Line is a intercity railway line being developed linking the cities of Quanzhou, Xiamen and Zhangzhou together, that will run in a North-South Direction.

On the 3rd of September, 2025, it was announced that the first section was reviewed and approved ahead of schedule.

Construction of the line is planned to start in 2025. After it is completed and opened to traffic in 2031, the commuting time from Nan'an Shuitou to Xiamen Island will be shortened to 30 minutes, and it will only take 1 hour from Shijing to the main urban area of Zhangzhou, truly drawing a three-dimensional transportation blueprint for the "Xiamen-Zhangzhou-Quanzhou 1-hour living circle".

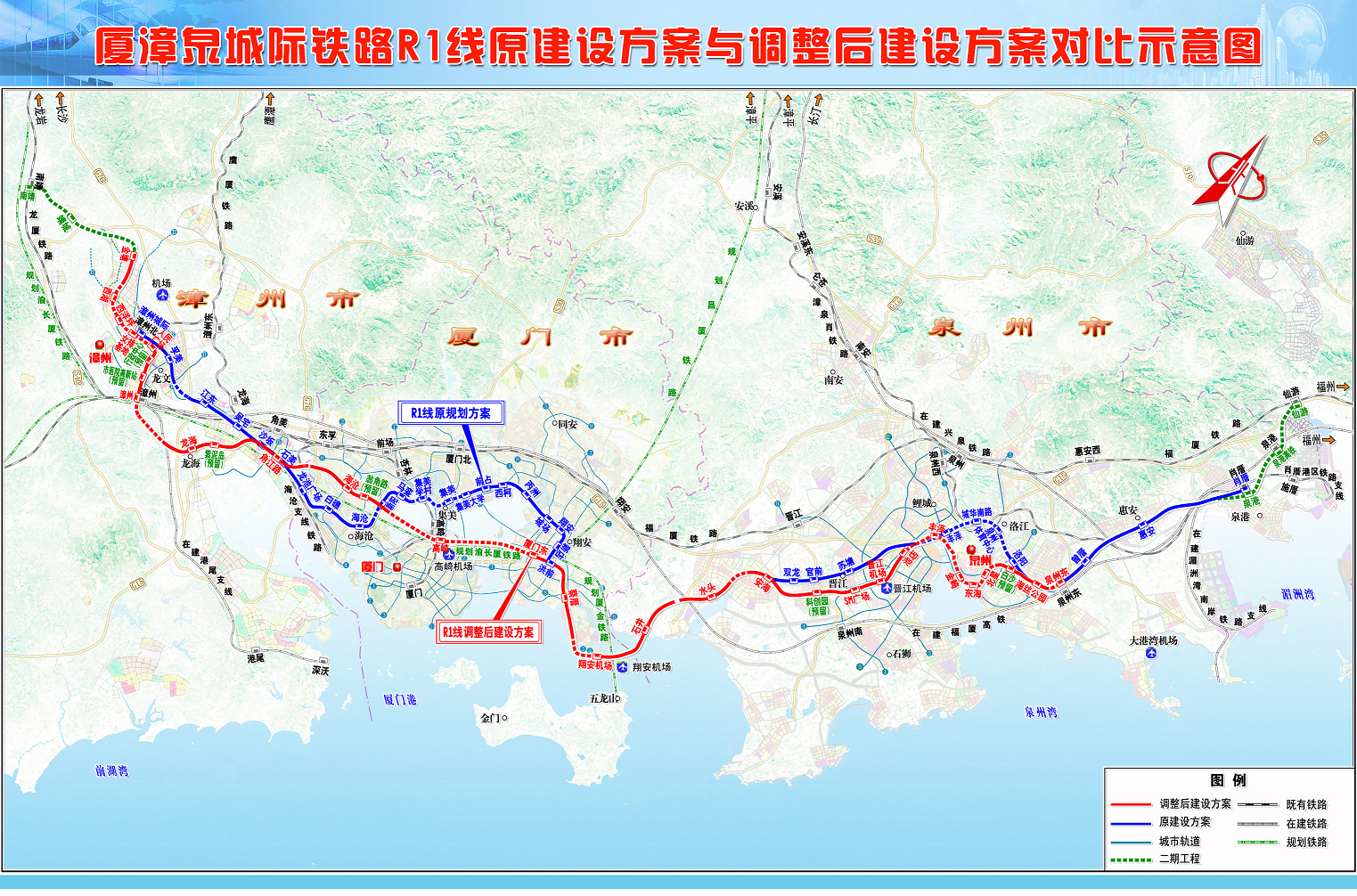
Map of the Line's Stations

== Stations ==
Station Name	Above/Underground	City	Region Served
Quangang Railway Station (泉港站) (Phase 2)	---	Quanzhou	Quangang District
Hui'an Railway Station (惠安站) (Phase 2)	---	Quanzhou	Hui'an County
Quanzhou East Railway Station (泉州东站)	Underground	Quanzhou	Quanzhou Taiwanese Investment Zone
Maritime Silk Road Art Park Station (海丝公园站)	Elevated	Quanzhou	Quanzhou Taiwanese Investment Zone
Beixing Station (北星站)	Underground	Quanzhou	Fengze District
Donghai Station (东海站)	Underground	Quanzhou	Fengze District
Jinqi Station (金崎站)	Underground	Quanzhou	Fengze District
Tonggang West Station (通港西站)	Underground	Quanzhou	Fengze District
Fengze Station (丰泽站)	Underground	Quanzhou	Fengze District
Chidian Station (池店站)	Underground	Quanzhou	Jinjiang City
Jinjiang Airport Station (晋江机场站)	Elevated	Quanzhou	Jinjiang City
SM Plaza Station (SM广场站)	Elevated	Quanzhou	Jinjiang City
Kechuang Park Station (科创园站) (Reserved)	Elevated	Quanzhou	Jinjiang City
Anhai Station (安海站)	Elevated	Quanzhou	Jinjiang City
Shuitou Station (水头站)	Elevated	Quanzhou	Nan'an City
Shijing Station (石井站)	Elevated	Quanzhou	Nan'an City
Xiang'an Airport Station (翔安机场站)	Underground	Xiamen	Xiang'an District
Caicuo Station (蔡厝站)	Elevated	Xiamen	Xiang'an District
Hongqian Station (洪前站)	Elevated	Xiamen	Xiang'an District
Xiamendong Railway Station (厦门东站)	Elevated	Xiamen	Xiang'an District
New Gaoqi Railway Station (新高崎站)	Underground	Xiamen	Huli District
Gaoqi Station (高崎站)	Underground	Xiamen	Huli District
Wengjiao Road Station (翁角路站)	Elevated	Xiamen	Haicang District
Jiaojiang Road Station (角江路站)	Elevated	Zhangzhou	Zhangzhou Taiwanese Investment Zone
Longhai Station (龙海站)	Elevated	Zhangzhou	Longhai District
Zhangzhou Railway Station (漳州站)	Underground	Zhangzhou	Zhangzhou High-Tech Industrial Zone
Zhangzhou Municipal Hospital & High-tech Zone Station (市医院高新站)	Underground	Zhangzhou	Zhangzhou High-Tech Industrial Zone
Zhangzhou Administrative Service Center Station (行政中心站)	Underground	Zhangzhou	Longwen District
People's Square Station (人民广场站)	Underground	Zhangzhou	Longwen District
Chinese Women's Volleyball Base Station (女排基地站)	Underground	Zhangzhou	Xiangcheng District
Xiyangping Station (西洋坪站)	Underground	Zhangzhou	Xiangcheng District
Xihu Station (西湖站)	Elevated	Zhangzhou	Xiangcheng District
Jintang Station (金塘站)	Elevated	Zhangzhou	Xiangcheng District
Jingcheng Station (靖城站) (Phase 2)	---	Zhangzhou	Nanjing County
Nanjing Railway Station (南靖站) (Phase 2)	---	Zhangzhou	Nanjing County
