= Sanming North railway station =

Railway station in Sanming, China

Sanming North 三明北
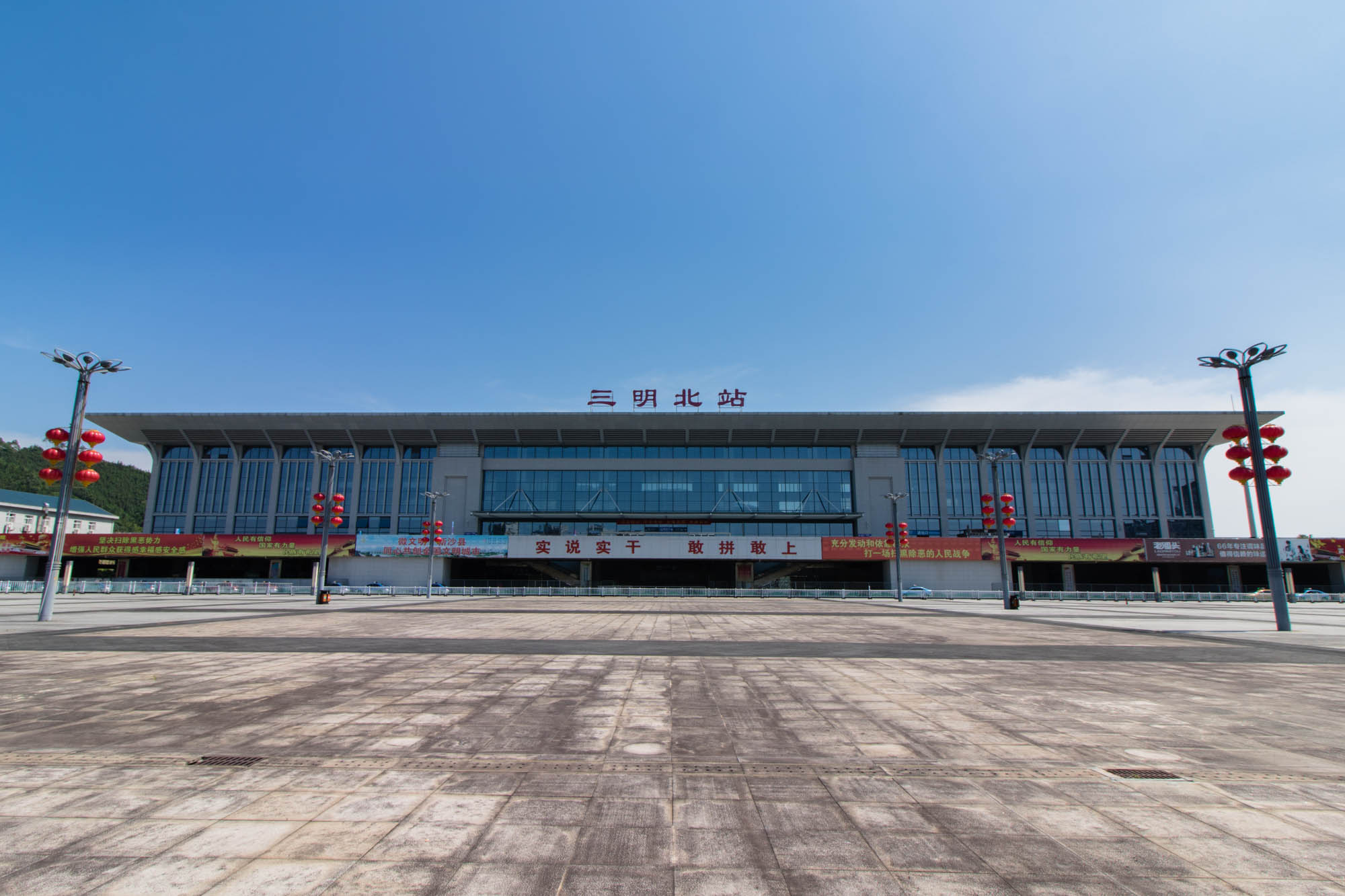
- Exterior of the station

General information
- Location: Shaxian District, Sanming, Fujian; China
- Coordinates: 26.3789°N 117.8018°E
- Operated by: China Railway Corporation
- Line(s): Yingtan–Xiamen railway; Xiangtang–Putian railway; Nanping–Longyan railway
- Platforms: 9

History
- Opened: 26 September 2013

Sanming North railway station is a railway station located in Shaxian District, Sanming, Fujian, China. The station handles both passengers and freight.

== History ==
The station opened on 26 September 2013 with the Xiangtang–Putian railway. At this time, services to the original Shaxian railway station on the Yingtan–Xiamen railway were suspended. In November 2014, work began to reroute the railway to pass through Sanming North and avoid the centre of Shaxian. This was completed in December 2017. The Nanping–Longyan railway was opened on 29 December 2018 and passes through this station. It also introduced a second railway station in Sanming, Sanming railway station in Sanyuan District.

Preceding station	China Railway High-speed	Following station
Yanping West towards Yanping	Nanping–Longyan railway	Sanming towards Longyan
