= Yanping West railway station =

Railway station in Nanping, Fujian

Yanping West 延平西
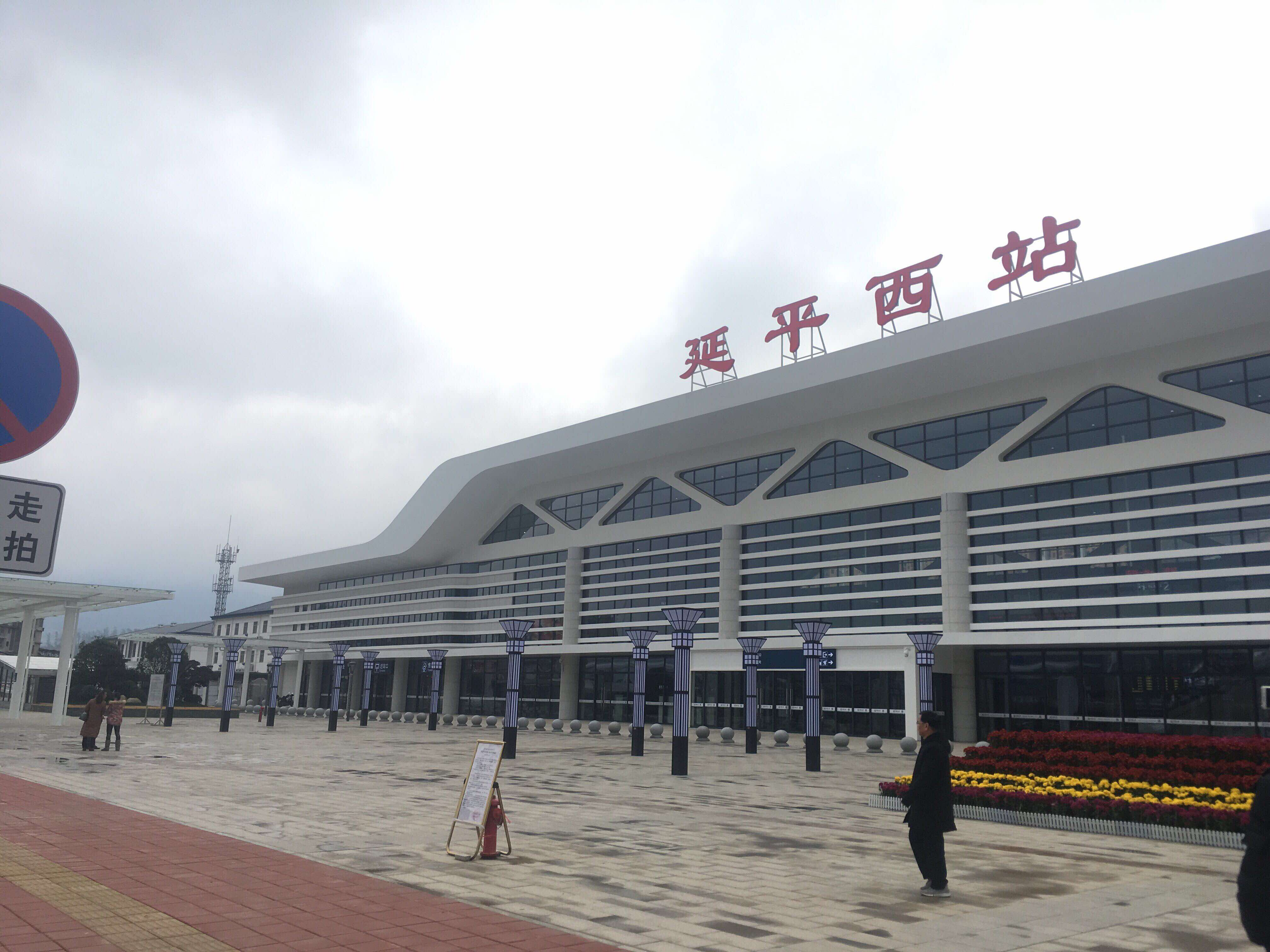

General information
- Location: Xiqin town, Yanping District, Nanping, Fujian; China
- Coordinates: 26°34′12.19″N 118°6′26.25″E
- Lines: Nanping–Fuzhou railway; Nanping–Longyan railway

History
- Opened: 29 December 2018
Location

Yanping West railway station (Chinese: 延平西站) is a railway station in Xiqin town, Yanping District, Nanping, Fujian, China.

== History ==
During construction of the station, a tomb was discovered. A new bridge was constructed across the Min River for access to the station.

The station opened with the Nanping–Longyan railway on 29 December 2018. The Nanping–Fuzhou railway was rerouted slightly and now passes through the station.

Preceding station	China Railway High-speed	Following station
Yanping Terminus	Nanping–Longyan railway	Sanming North towards Longyan
