= Wuci Township =

Wuci Township may refer to the following places:

- Wuqi District (梧棲區), formerly a township in Taichung, Republic of China (Taiwan)
- Wuqi Township, Zhangping (吾祠乡), in Zhangping, Fujian, People's Republic of China
