= Jiaomei railway station =

Railway station in Zhangzhou, China

Jiaomei 角美
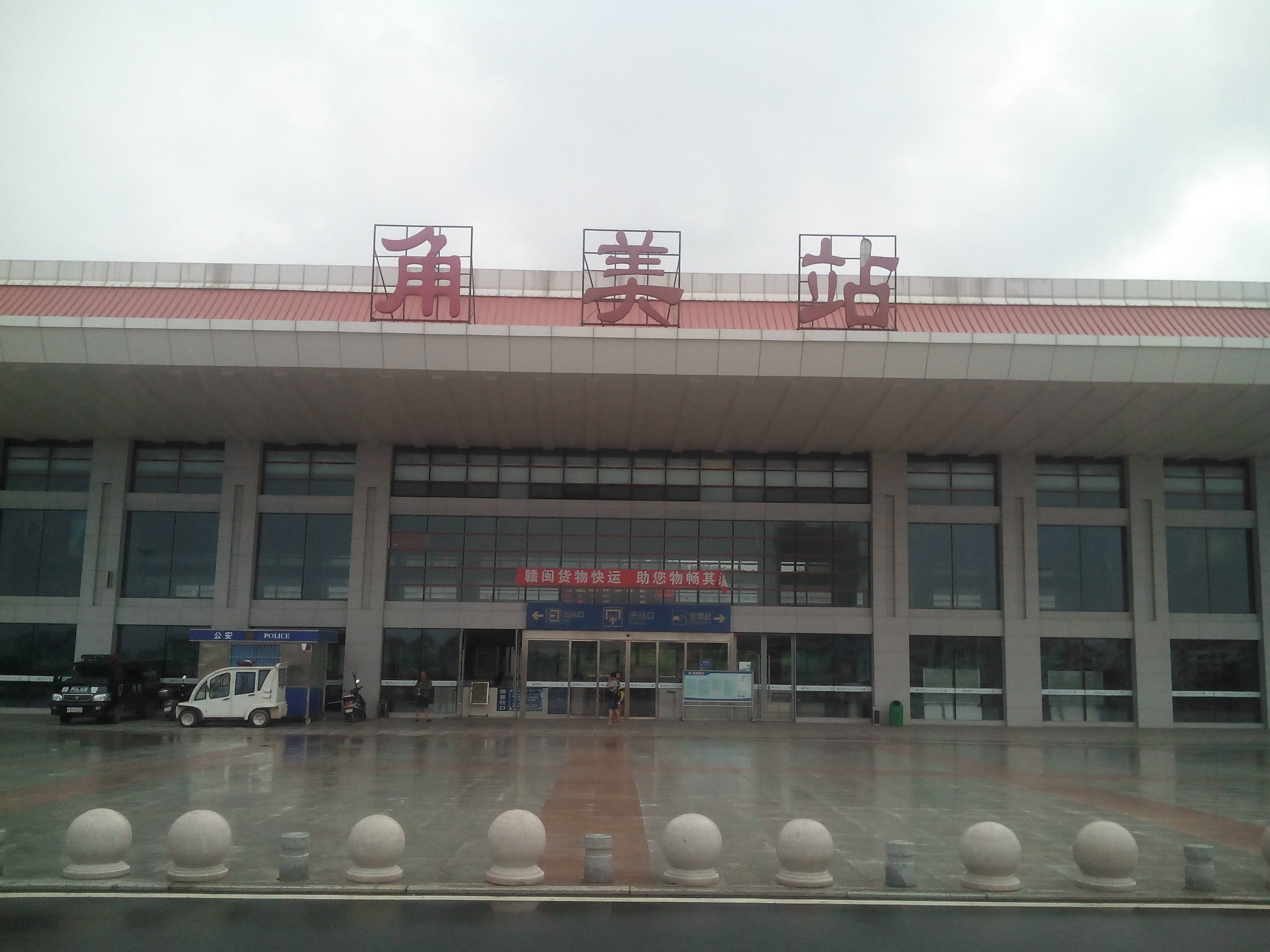

General information
- Location: Longhai City, Zhangzhou, Fujian; China
- Coordinates: 24.5287°N 117.8897°E
- Operator: Nanchang Railway Bureau, China Railway Corporation
- Line: Xiamen–Shenzhen railway
Location

Jiaomei railway station (Chinese: 角美站) is a railway station located in Longhai City, Zhangzhou, Fujian Province, China, on the Xiamen–Shenzhen railway operated by the Nanchang Railway Bureau, China Railway Corporation.

Preceding station	China Railway	Following station
Zhangzhou towards Longyan	Longyan–Xiamen railway	Xiamen Terminus
Preceding station	China Railway High-speed	Following station
Xiamen North Terminus	Xiamen–Shenzhen railway	Zhangzhou towards Shenzhen North
