= Shancheng, Nanjing County =

Shancheng 山城镇
- Town
- Location in Fujian Shancheng (China)
- Coordinates: 24°30′46″N 117°21′48″E
- Country: People's Republic of China
- Province: Fujian
- Prefecture-level city: Zhangzhou
- County: Nanjing
- Elevation: 30 m (98 ft)
- Time zone: UTC+8 (China Standard)
- Postal code: 363600
- Area code: 0596

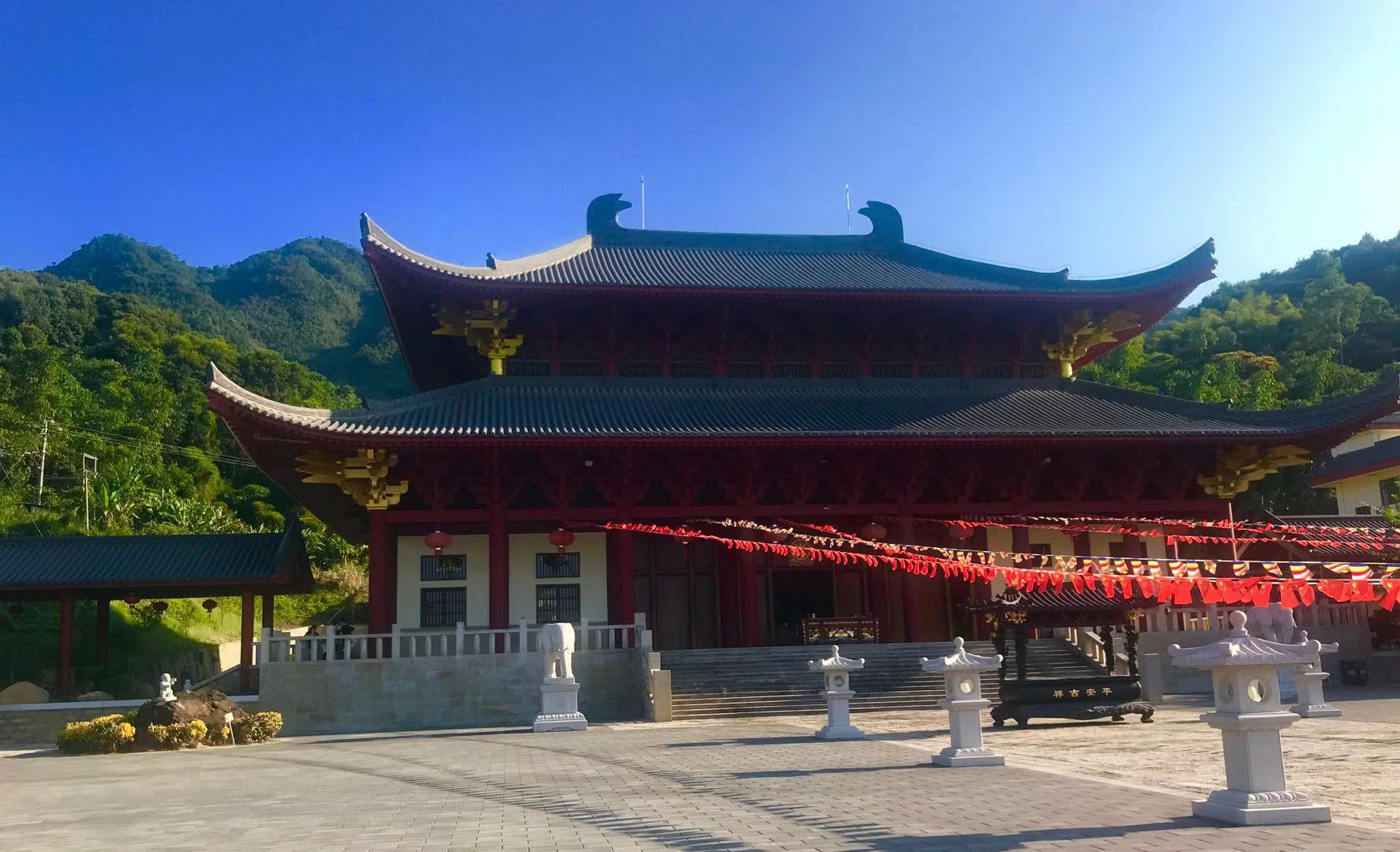
Ziyun Temple, Zijing Mountain, Shancheng Town, Nanjing

Shancheng Town (Chinese: 山城; pinyin: Shānchéng; lit. 'mountain city') is the county seat of Nanjing County, which is a constituent county of Zhangzhou Prefecture-level city, Fujian Province, China. As it is the case with most Chinese county seats, this is the place which most maps simply label as Nanjing [County] (南靖[县]).

== Transportation ==
Shancheng Town is the junction of several county roads, one of which, recently improved county route 562 (X562) connects Shancheng with the World Heritage Fujian Tulou sites around Shuyang Town in the western part of the county.

Shancheng Town is connected to Zhangzhou and Xiamen by frequent bus service; since this is Nanjing County's county seat, the buses' destination is usually indicated in schedules and on the signs as "Nanjing" (南靖).

On June 30, 2012, the high-speed Longyan–Xiamen Railway, crossing the eastern part of the county, was opened for service. It became the first ever railway line to cross the county. Nanjing Station is located about 15 km (by road) to the northeast of Shancheng's town centre, near Yanta Village (雁塔村); administratively, it is still part of Shancheng Town.

== See also ==
- List of township-level divisions of Fujian
