= Yingtan–Xiamen railway =

Railway line in China

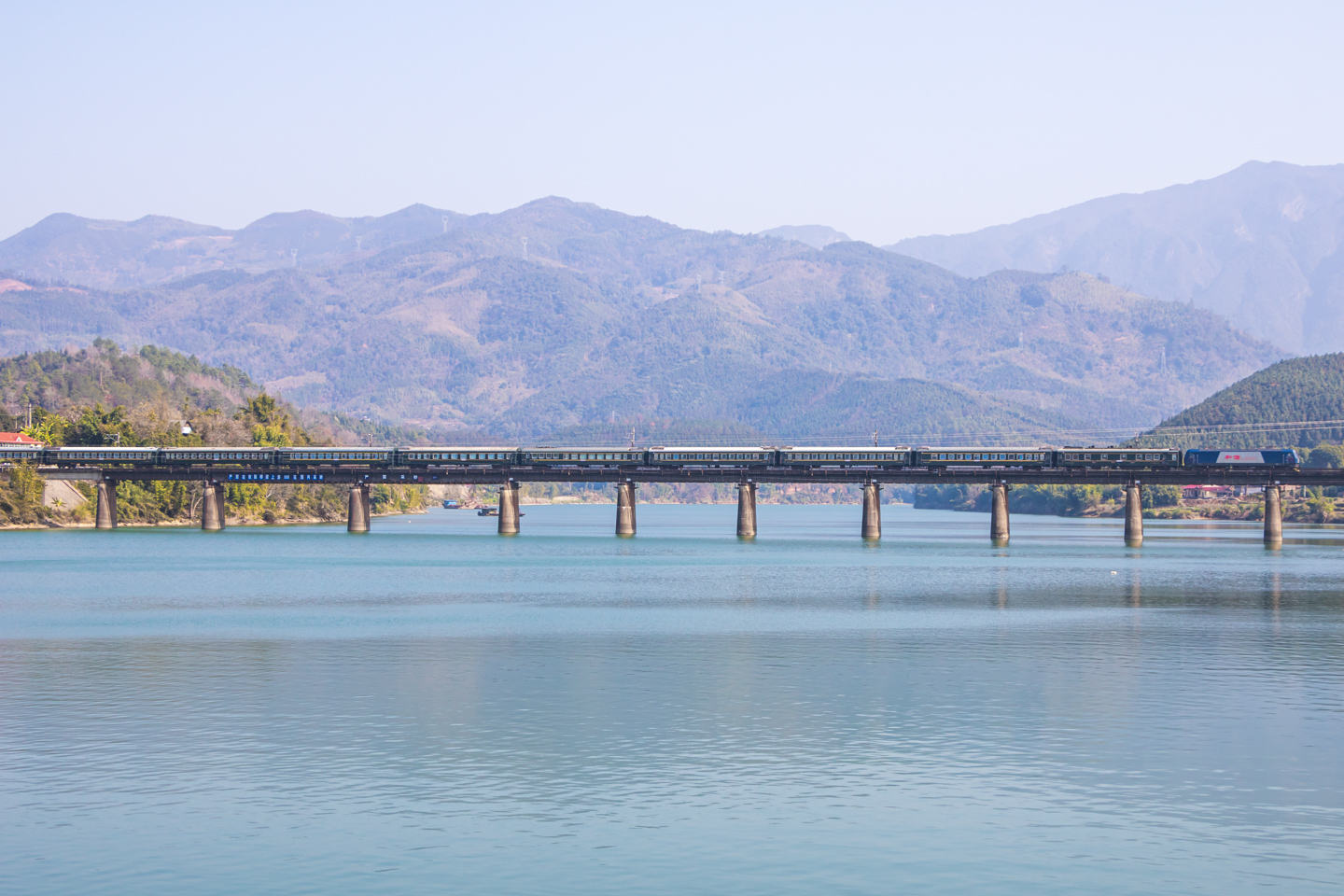
- Railway bridge in Laizhou, Fujian

Overview
- Native name: 鹰厦铁路
- Owner: China Railway
- Locale: Jiangxi and Fujian, China

Service
- Type: Heavy rail
- Operator(s): CR Nanchang

History
- Opened: 12 April 1957

Technical
- Line length: 705 km (438 mi)
- Track gauge: 1,435 mm (4 ft 8 1/2 in) standard gauge
- Electrification: Overhead line: 50 Hz, 25,000 V
- Operating speed: 60–80 km/h (37–50 mph)

Yingtan–Xiamen railway or Yingxia railway (simplified Chinese: 鹰厦铁路; traditional Chinese: 鷹廈鐵路; pinyin: yīngxià tiělù; Pe̍h-ōe-jī: eng-ē thih-lo̍), is a railroad in eastern China between Yingtan in Jiangxi province and Xiamen in Fujian province. The line is 694 km (431 mi) long and was built between 1954 and 1957. The Yingtan–Xiamen railway was the first railroad to be built in Fujian and serves as a major trunkline in China's railway network. Major cities and towns along route include Yingtan, Zixi, Guangze, Shaowu, Shunchang, Sha County, Sanming, Yongan, Zhangping, Zhangzhou, Hua'an and Xiamen.

== Line description ==
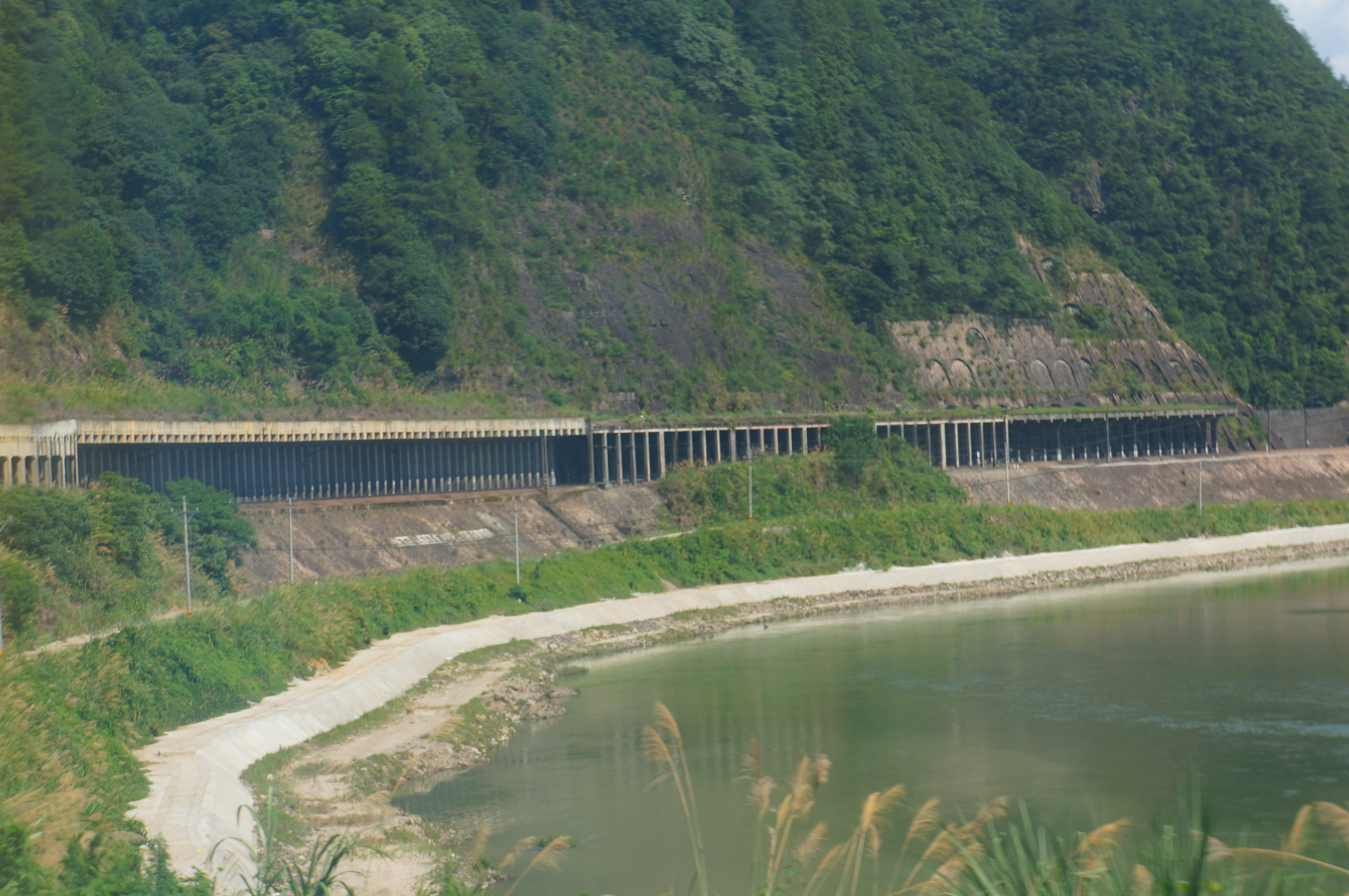
Railway near Shaowu

In the north, the Yingtan–Xiamen railway branches from the Zhejiang–Jiangxi railway at Yingtan in Jiangxi province and proceeds south to Zixi on the border with Fujian province. From Zixi, the railway follows Futun Stream, a headwater tributary of the Min River in a southeasterly course, through the Wuyi Mountains of northern Fujian, to Nanping. At Nanping, the railway turns to the southwest, following the Shaxi River through central Fujian to Yong'an. From Yong'an, the railway runs south to Zhangzhou and then east to Xiamen. Until January 2010, the railway was connected to the island of Xiamen via causeway from the mainland. On January 31, 2010, the Yingxia railway switched route to the newly opened Xinglin Railway Bridge. The line formerly continued past Xiamen railway station for 4.5 kilometres (2.8 miles). This section was abandoned in the 1980s and opened as a linear park called Xiamen Railway Cultural Park in 2010.

== History ==
The Yingtan–Xiamen railway was originally proposed by Sun Yat-Sen in his plan to build the Chinese nation. In October 1949, at the inaugural Chinese People's Political Consultative Conference in Beijing, Tan Kah Kee, a philanthropist and leader of the Singapore Chinese community, proposed that a railway be built in his native Fujian province. Mao Zedong said the proposal could not be implemented immediately, but was nonetheless supportive. Planning of the railway began in 1951 under Zhang Dingcheng, the first party-secretary of Fujian province, with Y553 million allocated from the central government. Three routes were proposed:

- Western Route running from Nanchang to Ganzhou and then to Ruijin, all in Jiangxi province, before turning east into southern Fujian, reaching Xiamen, on the coast.
- Central Route running from Nanchang to Nancheng and Shicheng on the Jiangxi side of the Jiangxi-Fujian border to Ruijin before turning east into southern Fujian, reaching, Xiamen on the coast.
- Eastern Route running from Yingtan in Jiangxi province, on the existing Zhejiang–Jiangxi railway, to Zixi and then entering northern Fujian and passing through Nanping and Sanming in central Fujian before reaching Zhangzhou and Xiamen in southern Fujian.

The Eastern Route was selected because it was the shortest and least expensive to build. The railway was intended to serve dual purposes of national defense and regional development. The coast of Fujian opposite of Taiwan was then a defensive frontline against the Nationalist Chinese government on Taiwan. Construction began in February 1955 under the joint-leadership of the Fujian People's Government and the Chinese People's Liberation Army, which had seven divisions mobilized and invited a working group of engineering advisors from the Soviet Union. As many as 12 divisions would be involved in the construction effort. Another 100,000 civilian workers also joined the effort. The railway passed through mountainous terrain that complicated building efforts and required explosives to level mountains and blast tunnels, and significant bridge-building. In October 1955, the Defense Minister Peng Dehuai requested that the railway be completed one year ahead of schedule and building efforts were expedited. The first tracks were laid in Xiamen in December 1956 and the entire Yingxia Railway was completed in 1957. It was the first railway to be built in Fujian province. Surplus funds and manpower were then used to build the Nanping–Fuzhou railway.

The Yingxia railway was electrified in sections from 1986 to 1993.

Passenger services on the section between Jiaomei and Sanming North were discontinued after 4 January 2019.

== Rail connections ==
- Yingtan: Shanghai–Kunming railway
- Shaxian: Xiangtang–Putian railway
- Nanping: Nanping–Fuzhou railway
- Zhangping: Zhangping–Longchuan railway, Zhangping–Quanzhou–Xiaocuo railway
- Xiamen: Fuzhou–Xiamen railway, Longyan–Xiamen railway

== See also ==
- List of railways in China
