= Shaxian delicacies =

Style of cuisine from Shaxian District, China

Logo of Shaxian Delicacies

Shaxian Delicacies (simplified Chinese: 沙县小吃; traditional Chinese: 沙縣小吃; pinyin: Shāxiàn xiǎochī) refers to a style of cuisine from Shaxian District, Sanming, Fujian, China.

== Business expansion in mainland China ==
As a business model, Shaxian Delicacies has the character of "connected and not locked" and "family oriented". The business model is similar to Yellow Braised Chicken Rice (黄焖鸡米饭) and Lanzhou Beef Noodles soup, and is mainly operated by Shaxian County locals. According to the tastes of various places, the dishes provided by "Shaxian Delicacies" are often adjusted accordingly, and are therefore welcomed and loved by many people.

In 1997, the government supported the expansion of Shaxian Delicacies across the country. Shaxian Delicacies eventually expanded from Fujian to the Pearl River Delta, and then to Beijing and the Yangtze Delta, and eventually became a nationwide food product.

As of 1999 there were over 3,000 restaurants in Fujian Province serving Sha County cuisine. As of 2007, about 13,000 restaurants throughout China, operated by natives of Sha County, serve the cuisine. Huang Fusong, an official of Fujian County, stated that 240 varieties of Shaxian Delicacies were national delicacies. By 2011 there were over 4,000 restaurants under trademark from the Association of Shaxian Delicacies. There is a Fujian Shaxian Delicacies Development Office in existence.

At the end of 2015, the official authorized stores had reached more than 20,000, while the total number of stores estimated by the media in 2017 reached 60 to 80,000, and the size of the stores reached several times that of KFC. Because Shaxian is a place name, it is prohibited as a trademark by relevant laws in China. Only the one with the Pac-Man like graphic logo is the authentic Shaxian delicacies.

Shaxian delicacies is a franchised state-owned enterprise, It is actually controlled by SASAC. The owners of Shaxian delicacies store only have the right to operate their own store, and share the profits.

== Overseas development ==
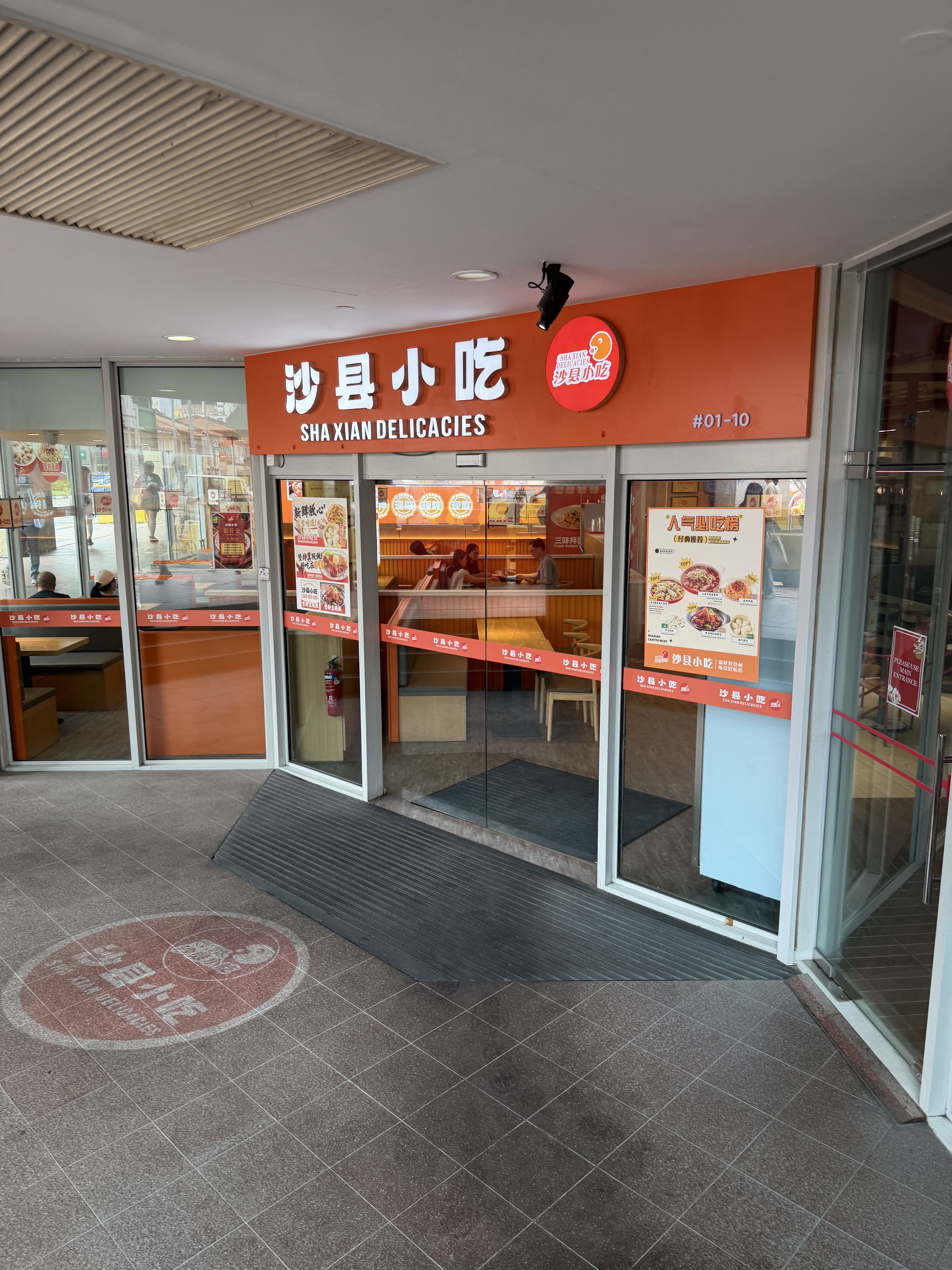
Image of a Shaxian delicacies restaurant in Rochor, Singapore.

In overseas markets, the Shaxian Commerce Bureau stated that “Shaxian Delicacies” has settled in more than 60 countries and regions including Hong Kong, Japan, Malaysia, Singapore, Australia, the United Kingdom, Macau, United States, Philippines etc., registered trademarks in 15 countries, and most countries abandoned the model that must be operated by Shaxian locals, its branch in Tokyo, Japan became a "queued" store, and a set meal was about 860 yen.

On January 10, 2018, Shaxian Delicacies was selected as the representative of Chinese cuisine to participate in the 2018 Pyeongchang Winter Olympics Food Exhibition in Korea.
