= Hengfeng–Nanping railway =

Railway line in People's Republic of China

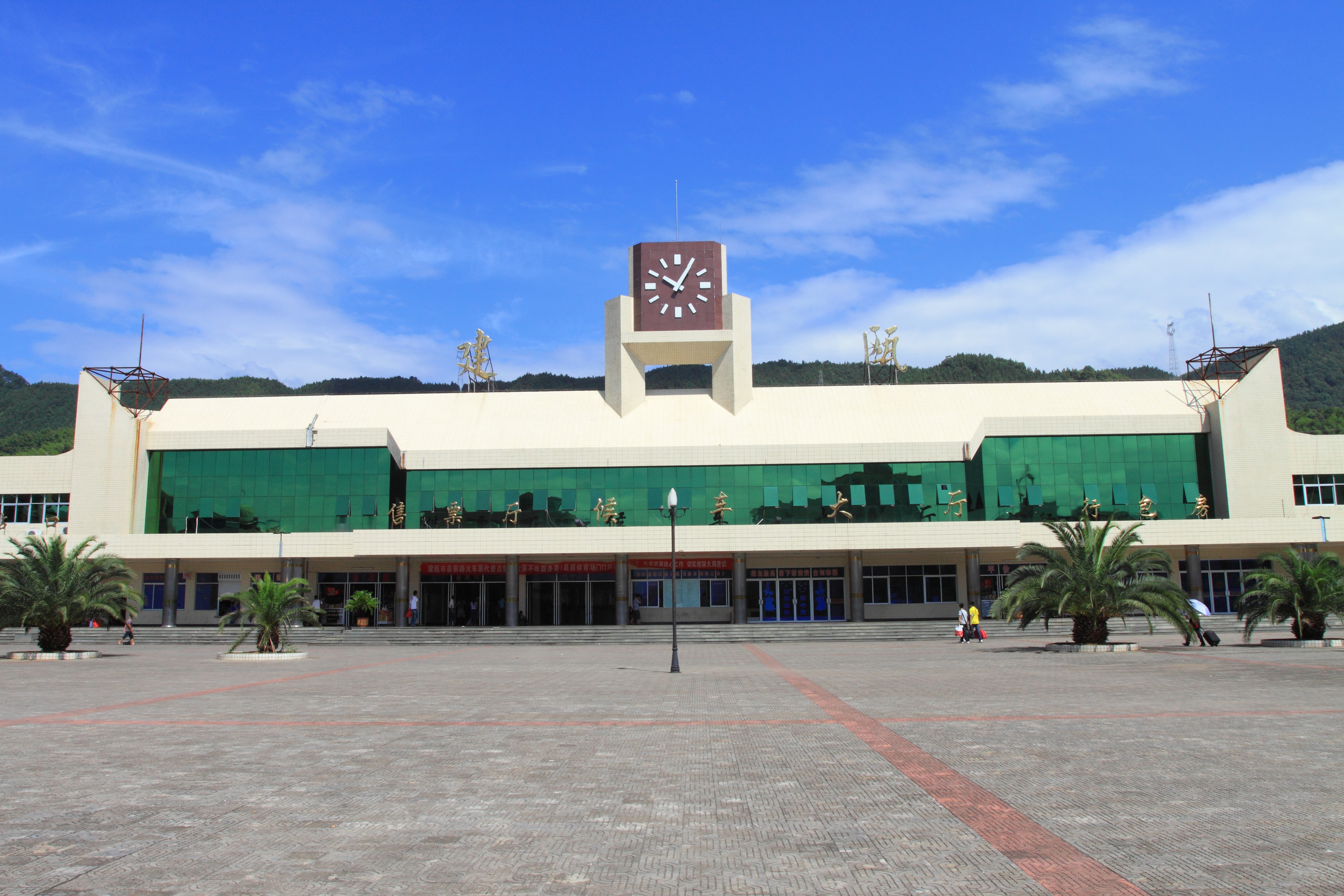
The Jian'ou railway station on the Hengnan railway

Hengfeng–Nanping railway, also known as the Hengnan railway (simplified Chinese: 横南铁路; traditional Chinese: 横南鐵路; pinyin: héngnán tiělù), is a railroad in eastern China between Hengfeng, Jiangxi Province and Nanping, Fujian Province. The line is 470 km (292 mi) long, including a spur line to Shangrao, and opened in December 1998. Major cities along route include Hengfeng, Wuyishan, Jianyang, Jian'ou, and Nanping.

== Route ==
The Hengfeng–Nanping railway connects Hengfeng, on the Shanghai–Kunming railway with Nanping, on the Nanping–Fuzhou railway and created Jiangxi's second rail connection with Fujian. In 2006, the Ministry of Railways, after upgrading the line for higher speed train service, joined most of this line with the Hengfeng–Nanping railway to create the Hengfeng–Fuzhou railway or Hengfu railway (横幅铁路). The line passes through the Wuyi Mountains, a UNESCO World Heritage Site.

== Rail connections ==
- Hengfeng: Shanghai–Kunming railway
- Nanping: Nanping–Fuzhou railway

== See also ==
- List of railways in China
