= Xiqin, Fujian =

Xiqin 西芹镇
- Town
- Location in Fujian
- Coordinates: 26.57207°N 118.10993°E
- Country: People's Republic of China
- Province: Fujian
- Prefecture-level city: Nanping
- District: Yanping District
- Time zone: UTC+8 (China Standard)

Xiqin (Chinese: 西芹; pinyin: Xīqín) is a town under the administration of Yanping District, Nanping in Fujian, China. As of 2018, it has one residential community and 20 villages under its administration.

== Transportation ==
Yanping West railway station is located in Xiqin.

== See also ==
- List of township-level divisions of Fujian
