= Qingzhou, Fujian =

Coordinates: 26.5306°N 117.9789°E

Qingzhou (Chinese: 青州镇) is a town in Shaxian District, Sanming, Fujian, China.
