= Kanshi, Fujian =

Kanshi 坎市镇
- Town
- Location in Fujian Kanshi (China)
- Coordinates: 24°55′07″N 116°53′18″E
- Country: People's Republic of China
- Province: Fujian
- Prefecture-level city: Longyan
- District: Yongding District
- Time zone: UTC+8 (China Standard)
- Postal code: 364102

Kanshi (Chinese: 坎市; pinyin: Kǎnshì; Wade–Giles: K'an-shih, also Kunshih), formerly known as Tai-ping (太平), is a town in southwestern Fujian province, People's Republic of China. It is under the administration of Yongding District, Longyan. As of 2020, it administers Kanshi Street Residential Community (坎市街社区) and the following six villages:

- Xiushan Village (秀山村)
- Wenguan Village (文馆村)
- Qingxi Village (清溪村)
- Xinluo Village (新罗村)
- Fushan Village (浮山村)
- Qiaxi Village (洽溪村)

== Transport ==
- Zhangping–Longchuan Railway

== See also ==
- List of township-level divisions of Fujian
