= Xiyuan Township, Zhangping =

Coordinates: 25.3097°N 117.3686°E

Xiyuan Township 西园乡
- Subdistrict

Chinese transcription(s)
  - Chinese: 西园乡
  - Pinyin: Xiyuán Xiāng
- Interactive map of Xiyuan Township
- Country: China
- Province: Fujian
- Prefecture: Zhangping
- District: Longyan
- Time zone: UTC+8 (China Standard Time)

Xiyuan Township is a township-level division situated in the Longyan district of Zhangping City, Fujian, China.

== See also ==
- List of township-level divisions of Fujian
