= Zhangping–Quanzhou–Xiaocuo railway =

Railway line in Fujian, China

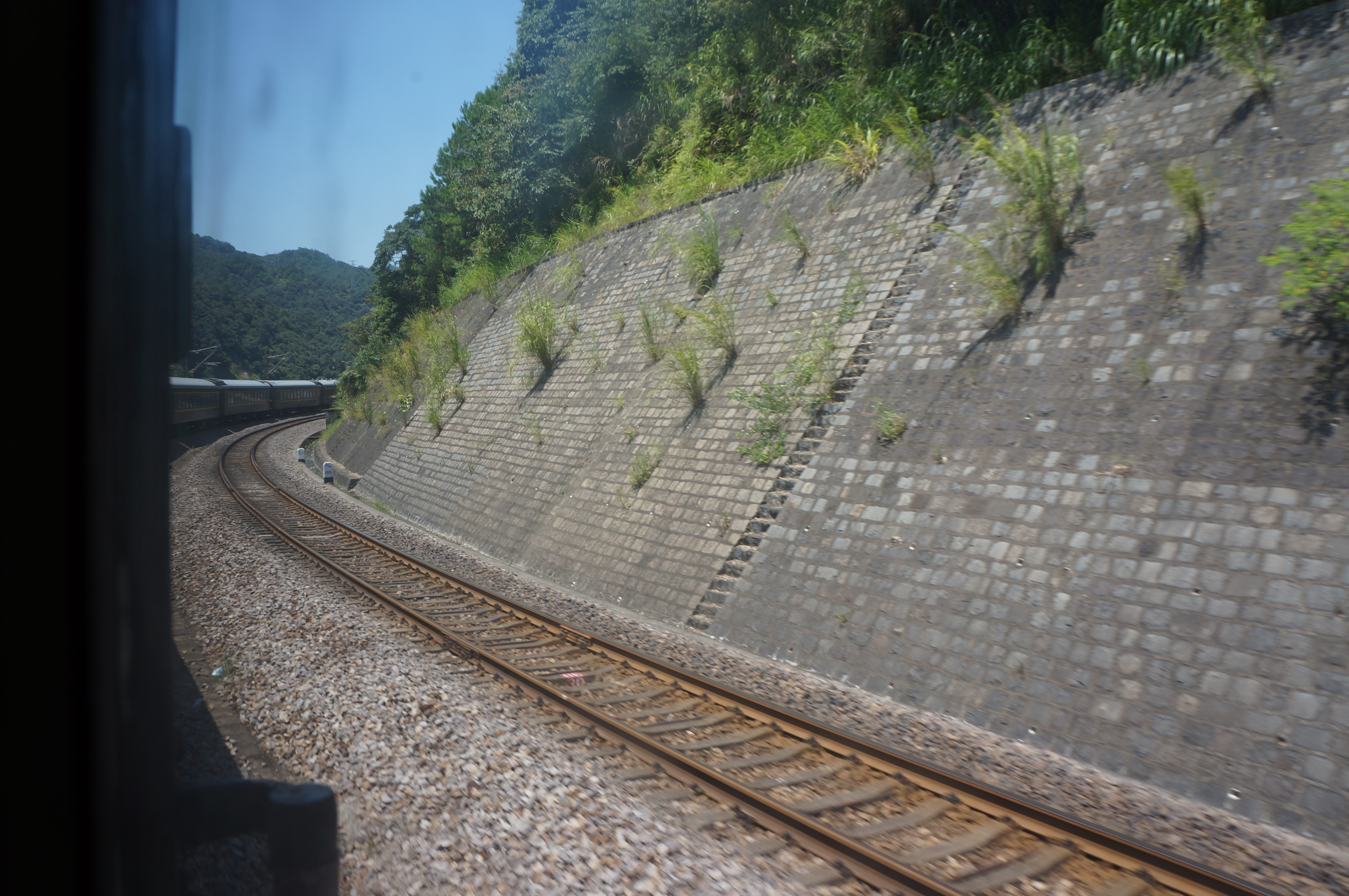
- Railroad near Meishuikeng

Overview
- Native name: 漳泉肖铁路
- Owner: China Railway
- Locale: Fujian, China
- Termini: Zhangping; Xiaocuo

Service
- Type: Heavy rail Regional rail
- Operator(s): CR Nanchang

History
- Opened: February 2001

Technical
- Line length: 263.8 km (164 mi)
- Track gauge: 1,435 mm (4 ft 8 1/2 in) standard gauge

The Zhangping–Quanzhou–Xiaocuo railway (simplified Chinese: 漳泉肖铁路; traditional Chinese: 漳泉肖鐵路; pinyin: Zhāng-Quán-Xiāo Tiělù; Pe̍h-ōe-jī: Chiāng-Choâⁿ-Siàu Thih-lo̍), also known as the Zhangquanxiao railway, is a regional railway in Fujian Province, China. The line runs 263.8 km (164 mi) eastward from Zhangping, Longyan in the interior, to Quanzhou, on the coast, and terminates at the Xiaocuo Harbor in the Port of Quanzhou. Construction began in 1958 and the Zhangping-Quanzhou section entered operation in 2001. The extension to Xiaochuo Harbor was built in 2007.

The Zhangping–Quanzhou section of the rail line used to have fairly active passenger service, with a number of fairly slow trains connecting Quanzhou East railway station with major cities throughout China. Passenger service on this line was terminated, and Quanzhou East railway station closed on December 9, 2014, presumably as a consequence of the introduction of much faster high-speed service on the Fuzhou–Xiamen railway and connecting lines.

== Rail connections ==
- Zhangping: Yingtan–Xiamen railway, Zhangping–Longchuan railway
- Quanzhou: Fuzhou–Xiamen railway

== See also ==
- List of railways in China
