= Xinqiao, Zhangping =

Xinqiao 新桥镇
- Town
- Location in Fujian Xinqiao (China)
- Coordinates: 25°35′55″N 117°30′39″E
- Country: People's Republic of China
- Province: Fujian
- Prefecture-level city: Longyan
- County-level city: Zhangping
- Elevation: 293 m (961 ft)
- Time zone: UTC+8 (China Standard)
- Area code: 0597

Xinqiao (simplified Chinese: 新桥; traditional Chinese: 新橋; pinyin: Xīnqiáo; lit. 'new bridge') is a town under the administration of Zhangping City in mountainous southwestern Fujian province, China, located 35 kilometres (22 mi) north-northeast of downtown Zhangping. As of 2011, it has 2 residential communities (社区) and 23 villages under its administration.

== See also ==
- List of township-level divisions of Fujian
