= Sanming Shaxian Airport =

Sanming Shaxian Airport 三明沙县机场
- IATA: SQJ; ICAO: ZSSM

Summary
- Airport type: Public
- Serves: Sanming
- Location: Shaxian District, Sanming, Fujian, China
- Opened: 7 March 2016
- Coordinates: 26°25′41″N 117°50′42″E

Map
- Location of airport in Fujian

Runways
Direction	Length		Surface
Direction	m	ft	Surface
06/24	2,600	8,530	Concrete

Statistics (2021)
- Passengers: 273,777
- Aircraft movements: 4,396
- Cargo (metric tons): 447.9

Sanming Shaxian Airport
- Simplified Chinese: 三明沙县机场
- Traditional Chinese: 三明沙縣機場
Transcriptions
Standard Mandarin
- Hanyu Pinyin: Sānmíng Shāxiàn Jīchǎng

Sanming Shaxian Airport (IATA: SQJ, ICAO: ZSSM) is an airport serving the city of Sanming in Fujian Province, China. It is located in Fenggang Subdistrict of Shaxian District. The airport was opened on 7 March 2016.

== History ==
Construction of Sanming Airport was first approved by the national government in 1993 and began in 1995, but stopped in 1998 in the wake of the 1997 Asian financial crisis after 160 million yuan was already spent. Construction resumed in 2005 with private investment, and the airport was declared the first privately owned airport in China, but soon stopped again for undisclosed reasons. In 2009, construction started for the third time, back with government funding worth 1.447 billion yuan. The airport was opened on 7 March 2016.

== Facilities ==
The airport has one runway that is 2,600 metres (8,500 ft) long (extendable to 2,800 metres (9,200 ft) in the future) and 45 metres (148 ft) wide (class 4C), and a 6,000-square-metre (65,000 sq ft) terminal building. It is designed to handle 430,000 passengers annually by 2020.

== Airlines and destinations ==
Airlines	Destinations
China Eastern Airlines	Kunming, Qingdao, Shanghai–Hongqiao
China Express Airlines	Chongqing
China Southern Airlines	Guangzhou
XiamenAir	Beijing–Daxing
Xizang Airlines	Chengdu–Shuangliu, Lhasa

== See also ==
- List of airports in China
- List of the busiest airports in China
