= Nanjing railway station (Fujian) =

Railway station in Fujian, China

Coordinates: 24°34′54″N 117°26′37″E

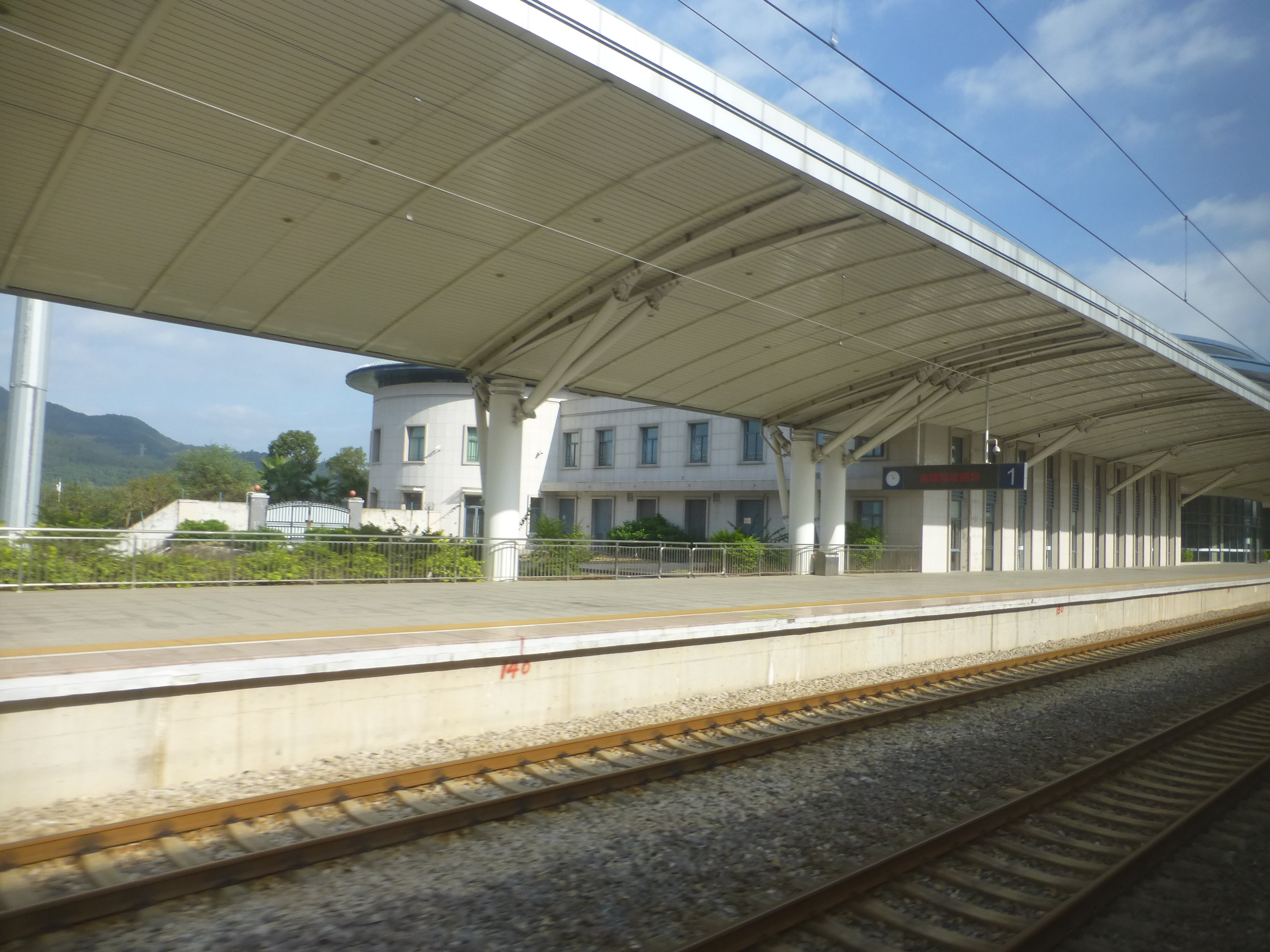
Nanjing railway station

Nanjing railway station (Chinese: 南靖火车站) is a railway station on the Longyan–Xiamen Railway (Longxia Railway) in Fujian Province of China. It is located in the eastern part of Nanjing County, near Yanta Village (雁塔村) of Shancheng town. The station is less than 15 km by road from the urban area of Shancheng town, i.e. Nanjing County's county seat. It is much closer to Fengtian Town, which is just across the river from the station.

To celebrate the tulou heritage of Nanjing County, the station is constructed in the shape of three round tulou (one large and two small ones), but using modern materials. Travelers should note, however, that actual tulous are to be mostly found in the western part of the county, quite a ways from the station.

The station was opened on June 30, 2012, simultaneously with the opening of the Longxia Railway.

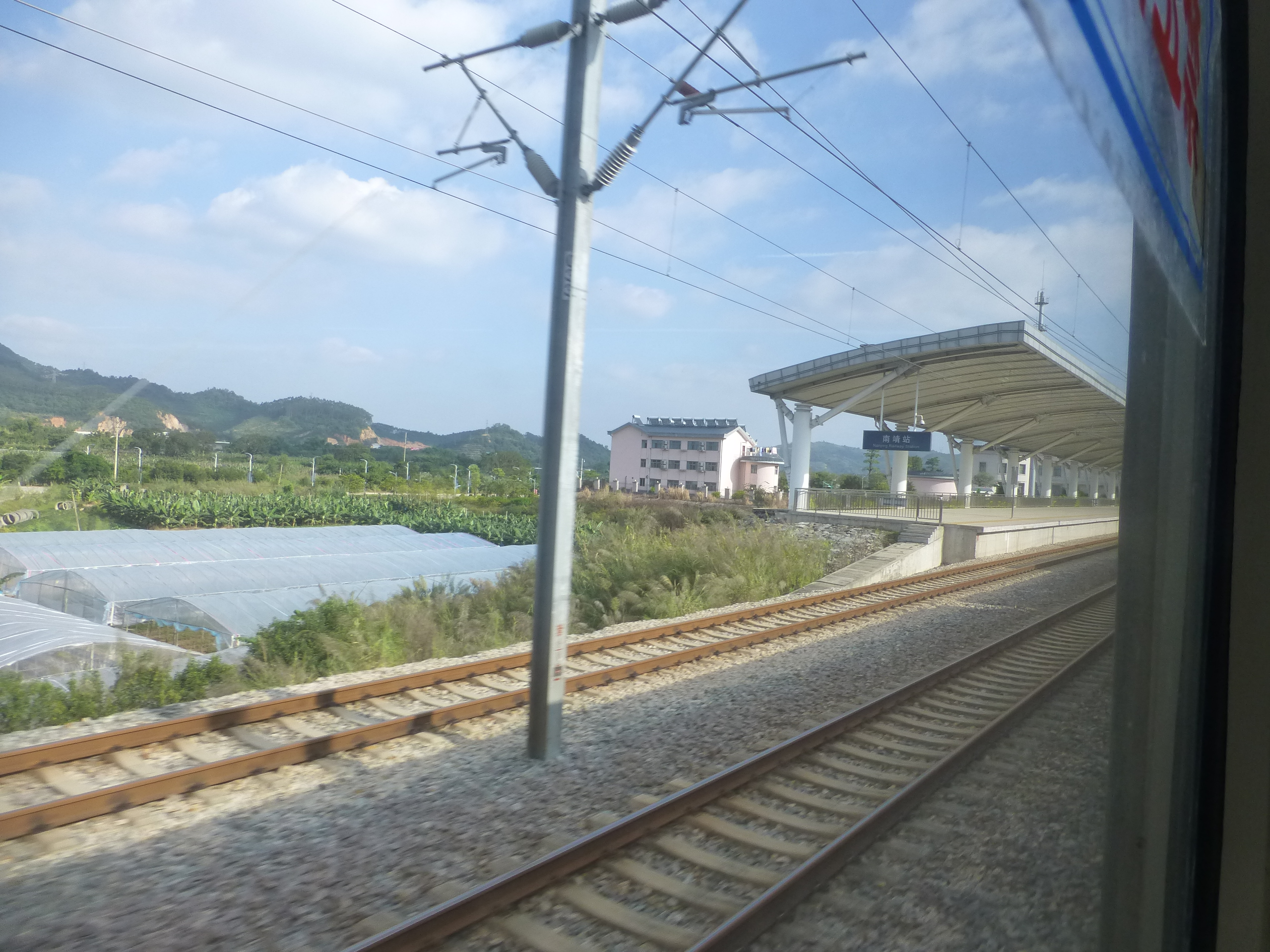
