= Zhangping =

Zhangping 漳平市
- County-level city
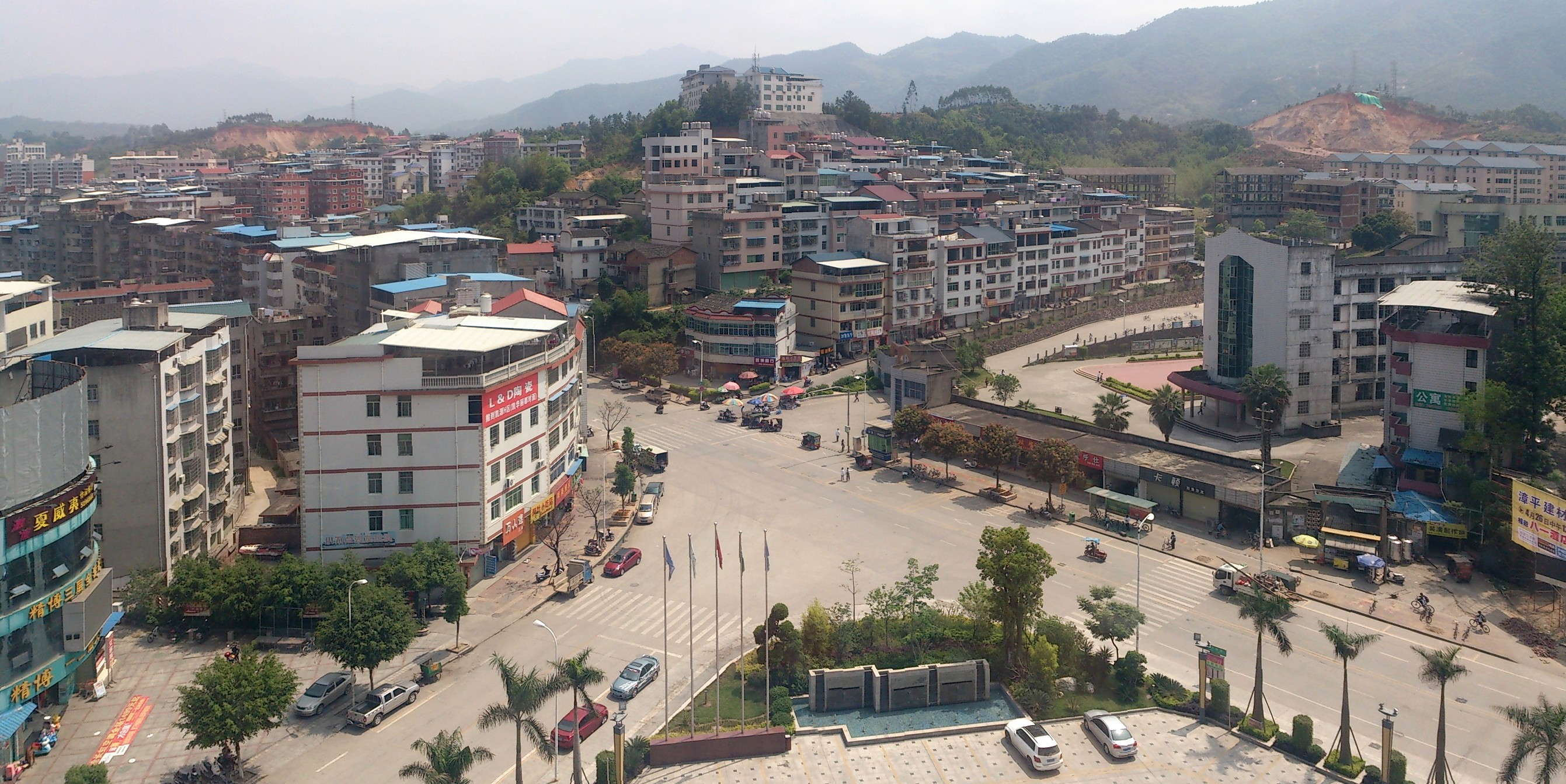

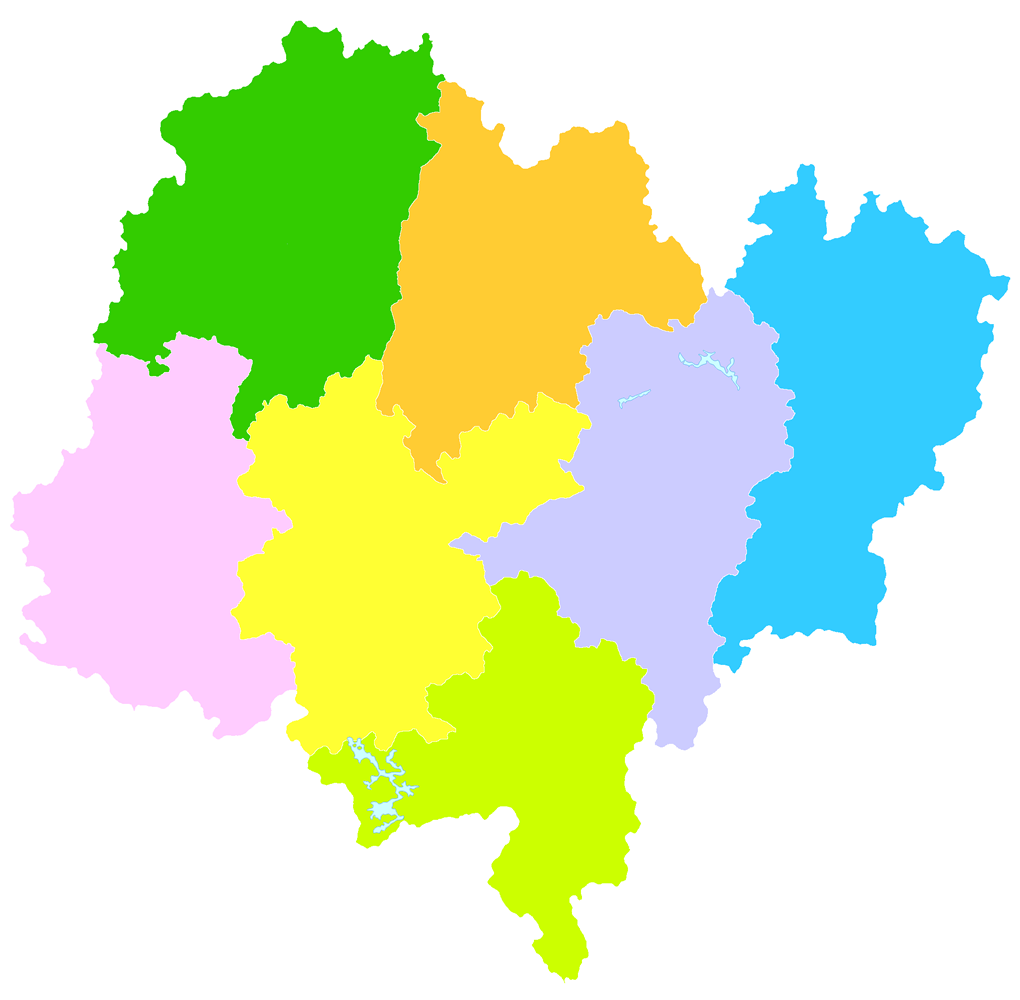
- Zhangping in Longyan

- Location in Fujian
- Coordinates: 25°17′25″N 117°25′12″E
- Country: People's Republic of China
- Province: Fujian
- Prefecture-level city: Longyan

Area
  - County-level city: 2,956 km^{2} (1,141 sq mi)
- Elevation: 165 m (541 ft)

Population (2020)
  - County-level city: 253,394
  - Density: 85.72/km^{2} (222.0/sq mi)
  - Urban: 147,462
- Time zone: UTC+8 (China Standard)

Zhangping (Chinese: 漳平; pinyin: Zhāngpíng; POJ: Chiang-pêng) is a county-level city in the southwest of Fujian province, People's Republic of China. It is under the administration of the prefecture-level city of Longyan.

== Transport ==
Zhangping is a rail hub in southwestern Fujian, where the Yingtan–Xiamen Railway, Zhangping–Longchuan, and Zhangping–Quanzhou–Xiaocuo Railways converge.

== Climate ==
Climate data for Zhangping, elevation 239 m (784 ft), (1991–2020 normals, extremes 1981–2010)
Month	Jan	Feb	Mar	Apr	May	Jun	Jul	Aug	Sep	Oct	Nov	Dec	Year
Record high °C (°F)	29.1 (84.4)	34.5 (94.1)	34.4 (93.9)	36.5 (97.7)	37.7 (99.9)	38.7 (101.7)	41.2 (106.2)	40.0 (104.0)	38.3 (100.9)	36.5 (97.7)	36.5 (97.7)	29.9 (85.8)	41.2 (106.2)
Mean daily maximum °C (°F)	18.4 (65.1)	19.9 (67.8)	22.4 (72.3)	26.8 (80.2)	29.8 (85.6)	32.1 (89.8)	34.7 (94.5)	34.2 (93.6)	32.2 (90.0)	28.8 (83.8)	24.6 (76.3)	19.7 (67.5)	27.0 (80.5)
Daily mean °C (°F)	12.2 (54.0)	14.1 (57.4)	16.9 (62.4)	21.1 (70.0)	24.3 (75.7)	26.6 (79.9)	28.3 (82.9)	27.8 (82.0)	26.1 (79.0)	22.4 (72.3)	18.0 (64.4)	13.1 (55.6)	20.9 (69.6)
Mean daily minimum °C (°F)	8.4 (47.1)	10.3 (50.5)	13.1 (55.6)	17.2 (63.0)	20.5 (68.9)	23.2 (73.8)	24.0 (75.2)	24.0 (75.2)	22.3 (72.1)	18.0 (64.4)	13.7 (56.7)	9.1 (48.4)	17.0 (62.6)
Record low °C (°F)	−3.2 (26.2)	−1.7 (28.9)	−1.3 (29.7)	7.2 (45.0)	11.5 (52.7)	15.0 (59.0)	19.0 (66.2)	19.1 (66.4)	14.5 (58.1)	6.1 (43.0)	−0.3 (31.5)	−5.4 (22.3)	−5.4 (22.3)
Average precipitation mm (inches)	61.5 (2.42)	87.3 (3.44)	159.4 (6.28)	158.0 (6.22)	217.2 (8.55)	256.0 (10.08)	136.5 (5.37)	192.8 (7.59)	123.3 (4.85)	48.9 (1.93)	44.3 (1.74)	46.3 (1.82)	1,531.5 (60.29)
Average precipitation days (≥ 0.1 mm)	8.8	11.8	15.9	15.3	17.7	18.0	13.8	15.9	11.4	5.9	6.4	7.7	148.6
Average snowy days	0.2	0	0	0	0	0	0	0	0	0	0	0.1	0.3
Average relative humidity (%)	76	76	77	77	78	80	75	78	76	73	75	76	76
Mean monthly sunshine hours	109.4	95.9	95.9	111.3	123.8	130.1	201.8	182.7	162.9	163.3	133.8	122.0	1,632.9
Percentage possible sunshine	33	30	26	29	30	32	48	46	45	46	41	37	37
Source: China Meteorological Administration

== Administrative divisions ==
Subdistricts:

- Jingcheng Subdistrict (菁城街道), Guilin Subdistrict (桂林街道)

Towns:

- Xinqiao (新桥镇), Yongfu (永福镇), Xinan (溪南镇), Shuangyang (双洋镇), Heping (和平镇), Gongqiao (拱桥镇), Xianghu (象湖镇), Chishui (赤水镇)

Townships:

- Luzhi Township (芦芝乡), Xiyuan Township (西园乡), Nanyang Township (南洋乡), Guantian Township (官田乡), Wuci Township (吾祠乡), Lingdi Township (灵地乡)

== Qihe Cave site ==
The Qihe Cave site is located in a karst cave in Zaotou Village (灶头村), Xianghu (象湖镇). Beginning from 2008, archaeological excavations have unearthed human fossils and human-made artefacts from a cultural layer that spans from ca. 15,000–5000 BCE.
