= Yanping =

Yanping may refer to:

== Modern locations ==
- Yanping District, a district in Nanping, Fujian, China
- Yanping, the former romanization of Enping in Guangdong, China
- Yanping Township, a township in Taitung County, Taiwan
- Taipei Private Yan Ping High School, a high school in Taipei, Taiwan

== History ==
- Prince of Yanping, a title held by
  - Koxinga (1624–1662), a leader of the Ming resistance during the rise of the Qing
  - Zheng Jing
  - Zheng Keshuang
- Kingdom of Yanping, another name for the Ming successor state of Tungning on Taiwan

=== Historical eras ===
- Yanping (106), era name used by Emperor Shang of Han
- Yanping (397), era name used by Murong Lin, self-proclaimed emperor of Later Yan

== People ==
- Yan Ying, a statesman of the state of Qi, who was also known as Yan Pingzhong
