= Shuyang, Fujian =

Shuyang 书洋镇
- Town
- Location in Fujian Shuyang (China)
- Coordinates: 24°37′37″N 117°06′27″E
- Country: People's Republic of China
- Province: Fujian
- Prefecture-level city: Zhangzhou
- County: Nanjing
- Elevation: 484 m (1,588 ft)
- Time zone: UTC+8 (China Standard)

Shuyang (simplified Chinese: 书洋; traditional Chinese: 書洋; pinyin: Shūyáng; Pe̍h-ōe-jī: Su-iûⁿ) is a town in Nanjing County, southern Fujian province, China.

== See also ==
- List of township-level divisions of Fujian
