= Nanjing County =

Nanjing County 南靖县
- County
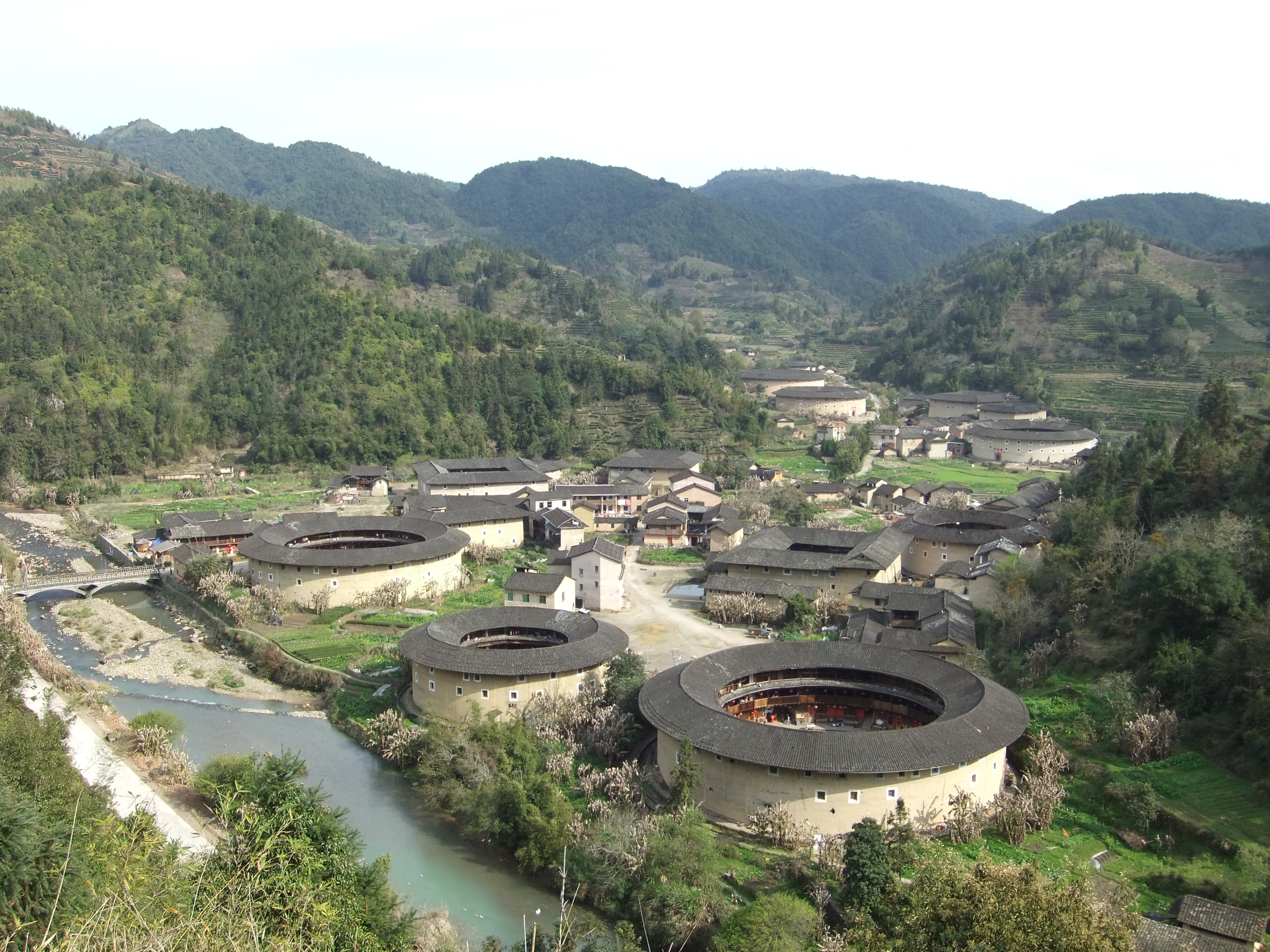
- Hekeng Village, Shuyang Town, Nanjing County

- Location of the seat in Fujian
- Coordinates: 24°30′53″N 117°21′26″E
- Country: People's Republic of China
- Province: Fujian
- Prefecture-level city: Zhangzhou

Area
  - Total: 227.7 km^{2} (87.9 sq mi)

Population (2020 census)
  - Total: 305,259
  - Density: 1,341/km^{2} (3,472/sq mi)
- Time zone: UTC+8 (China Standard)

Nanjing County (simplified Chinese: 南靖县; traditional Chinese: 南靖縣; pinyin: Nánjìng Xiàn; Pe̍h-ōe-jī: Lâm-chiūⁿ-koān) is a county under the administration of Zhangzhou City, in the south of Fujian province, People's Republic of China.

== Administrative division ==
Nanjing County is administratively divided into several towns:

- Shancheng (山城镇) - the county seat
- Jingcheng (靖城镇),
- Longshan (龙山镇),
- Chuanchang (船场镇),
- Jinshan (金山镇),
- Hexi (和溪镇),
- Kuiyang (奎洋镇),
- Nankeng (南坑镇),
- Fengtian (丰田镇),
- Meilin (梅林镇),
- Shuyang (书洋镇)

== Climate ==
Climate data for Nanjing, elevation 54 m (177 ft), (1991–2020 normals, extremes 1981–2010)
Month	Jan	Feb	Mar	Apr	May	Jun	Jul	Aug	Sep	Oct	Nov	Dec	Year
Record high °C (°F)	30.7 (87.3)	32.6 (90.7)	34.6 (94.3)	36.5 (97.7)	37.2 (99.0)	38.3 (100.9)	40.1 (104.2)	40.3 (104.5)	37.8 (100.0)	36.0 (96.8)	35.3 (95.5)	31.2 (88.2)	40.3 (104.5)
Mean daily maximum °C (°F)	19.3 (66.7)	20.1 (68.2)	22.3 (72.1)	26.4 (79.5)	29.5 (85.1)	32.1 (89.8)	34.5 (94.1)	33.9 (93.0)	32.3 (90.1)	29.2 (84.6)	25.6 (78.1)	21.2 (70.2)	27.2 (81.0)
Daily mean °C (°F)	13.6 (56.5)	14.6 (58.3)	17.0 (62.6)	21.1 (70.0)	24.4 (75.9)	27.1 (80.8)	28.6 (83.5)	28.1 (82.6)	26.7 (80.1)	23.3 (73.9)	19.5 (67.1)	15.1 (59.2)	21.6 (70.9)
Mean daily minimum °C (°F)	9.9 (49.8)	11.1 (52.0)	13.4 (56.1)	17.3 (63.1)	21.0 (69.8)	23.8 (74.8)	24.6 (76.3)	24.5 (76.1)	23.1 (73.6)	19.1 (66.4)	15.4 (59.7)	11.1 (52.0)	17.9 (64.1)
Record low °C (°F)	−1.1 (30.0)	−0.4 (31.3)	0.7 (33.3)	7.1 (44.8)	11.6 (52.9)	15.0 (59.0)	20.8 (69.4)	21.2 (70.2)	16.2 (61.2)	8.0 (46.4)	2.6 (36.7)	−2.9 (26.8)	−2.9 (26.8)
Average precipitation mm (inches)	50.5 (1.99)	78.2 (3.08)	120.8 (4.76)	147.2 (5.80)	207.4 (8.17)	284.9 (11.22)	204.5 (8.05)	306.1 (12.05)	193.3 (7.61)	59.6 (2.35)	42.7 (1.68)	44.1 (1.74)	1,739.3 (68.5)
Average precipitation days (≥ 0.1 mm)	8.6	11.7	14.8	15.0	17.8	18.6	14.4	17.3	12.4	5.0	5.9	7.1	148.6
Average relative humidity (%)	78	79	80	79	81	83	79	81	79	76	77	77	79
Mean monthly sunshine hours	127.1	97.4	96.4	113.7	126.1	144.0	218.7	197.9	180.8	182.1	157.3	146.6	1,788.1
Percentage possible sunshine	38	30	26	30	31	35	53	50	49	51	48	45	41
Source: China Meteorological Administration

== Sights ==
Nanjing County, and in particular its western part (Shuyang and Meilin Towns), is the location of many famous Fujian Tulou. Out of the 10 tulou sites listed on UNESCO's World Heritage list, four are in Nanjing County:

- Tianluokeng Tulou cluster
- Hekeng Tulou cluster (Hekeng Village), near Qujiang administrative village, Shuyang Town
- Hegui Lou
- Huaiyuan Lou

== Transportation ==
Until 2012, Nanjing County had no railways. The Longyan–Xiamen Railway, opened on June 30, 2012, became the first railway to cross the county. The two stations within the county are Nanjing Station (located near Fengtian Town, about 15 km (9.3 mi) (by road) to the northeast of the county seat, Shancheng) and Longshan; they serve the county's eastern and northern parts.
