= Xiangtang–Putian railway =

Railway line in China

Xiangtang–Putian railway 向莆铁路
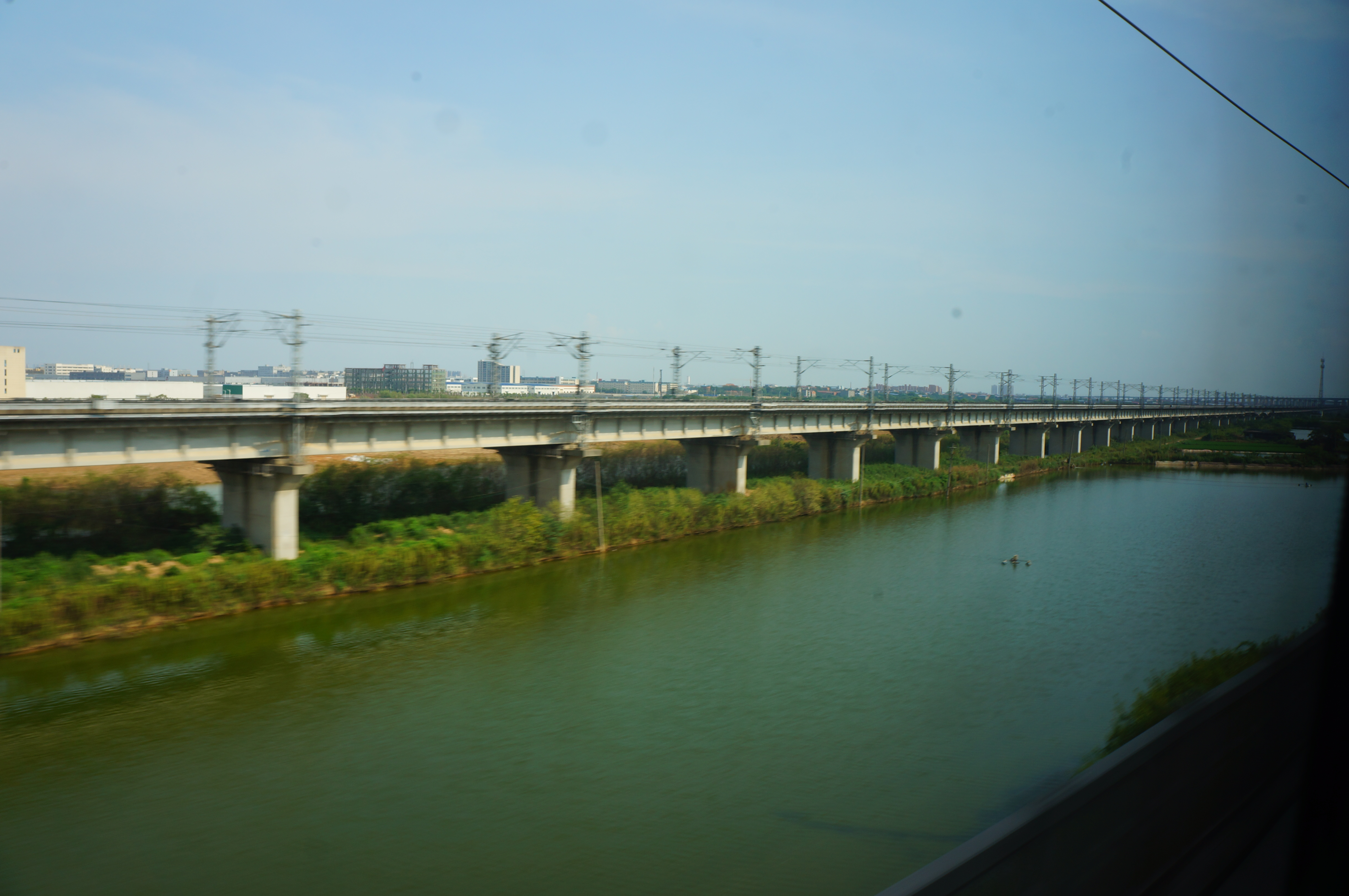
- Elevated tracks near Nanchang

Overview
- Owner: China Railway
- Locale: China

Service
- Type: Higher-speed rail Heavy rail Regional rail
- Operator(s): China Railway Nanchang Group

Technical
- Line length: 548 km (341 mi)
- Track gauge: 1,435 mm (4 ft 8 1/2 in)
- Operating speed: 200 km/h (124 mph)

Map of the Xiangtang–Putian railway

Xiangtang–Putian railway or Xiangpu railway (simplified Chinese: 向莆铁路; traditional Chinese: 向莆鐵路; pinyin: xiàngpǔ tiělù), is a Class I higher-speed railway in eastern China linking Nanchang and Fúzhou (福州), the provincial capitals, respectively, of Jiangxi and Fujian Province. The line is named after Xiangtang, a township south of Nanchang, which was originally slated to serve as a terminus, and Putian, on the coast of Fujian, at which the southern branch of the Xiangpu railway terminates. The line actually begins at the Lehua East Station, a rail junction for the Beijing–Kowloon and Nanchang–Jiujiang intercity railways north of Nanchang. The line heads south to Nanchang West Railway Station and bypasses Xiangtang on its way to Fǔzhou (抚州). After entering Fujian, the line forks at Yongtai with the northern fork heading to Fúzhou (福州) and the southern fork going to Putian. The Nanchang to Yongtai section of the line plus the northern fork to Fuzhou is officially named the Nanchang–Fuzhou or Changfu railway. The southern fork is officially named the Yongtai–Putian or Yongpu railway.

Including both branches, the Xiangpu has a total length of 635.9 km (395 mi) with 24 stations. Construction of the line began on October 1, 2008 and required investments of about Y51.6 billion. The line opened on September 26, 2013. The Xiangtang–Putian railway can accommodate trains running at speeds of up to 200 km/h (125 mph) and serves as a major trunkline in China's railway network. Major cities and towns along route include Nanchang, Fǔzhou (抚州), Nancheng and Nanfeng in Jiangxi and Jianning, Taining, Jiangle, Shaxian, Youxi, Yongtai, Fúzhou (福州) and Putian in Fujian.

== Line description ==
The Xiangtang–Putian railway runs in a southeasterly direction from Nanchang to Fuzhou and Putian. The line traverses the rugged and scenic Wuyi Mountains and has several tunnels over 10 km (6.2 mi) in length.

The Xiangtan–Putian railway is not the first railway link between the Nanchang area and Fujian. It is preceded by an older line (the Yingtan to Nanping section of the Yingtan–Xiamen railway, and the Nanping–Fuzhou railway thereafter), originally constructed in the late 1950s. However, the new railway does not closely parallel the older one: instead, it follows a roughly parallel route located 40–50 km (25–31 mi) to the southwest of the older rail line, and which in many areas is much closer to the route of the G70 Fuzhou–Yinchuan Expressway. This allows the new line to serve cities and counties that previously had no, or little, rail service.

== History ==
The Xiangpu Line shortened rail travel times from Nanchang to Fuzhou and Xiamen from 11 and 16 hours to 3.5 and just under 5 hours. Immediately after the Xiangpu Line opened in late September 2013, regional airlines reduced plane fare from Nanchang to Xianmen by 80% to Y240 stay competitive with high-speed trains, which cost Y252.50 and Y210, respectively, for first and second class tickets. Plane tickets for Nanchang to Fuzhou routes fell by as much as 84%. Though plane travel to both cities require flight time of only 1 hour and 10 minutes, train travelers save the time of traveling to and from the airports, which in the case of Nanchang and Fuzhou are both located over 30 km (19 mi) outside the city centre.

== Rail connections ==
- Nanchang: Beijing–Kowloon railway, Nanchang–Jiujiang intercity railway, Shanghai–Kunming railway
- Sha County: Yingtan–Xiamen railway
- Fuzhou: Wenzhou–Fuzhou railway, Fuzhou–Xiamen railway, Nanping–Fuzhou railway
- Putian: Fuzhou–Xiamen railway

== See also ==
- List of railways in China
