= Quanzhou East railway station =

Railway station in Quanzhou, Fujian

Quanzhou East 泉州东
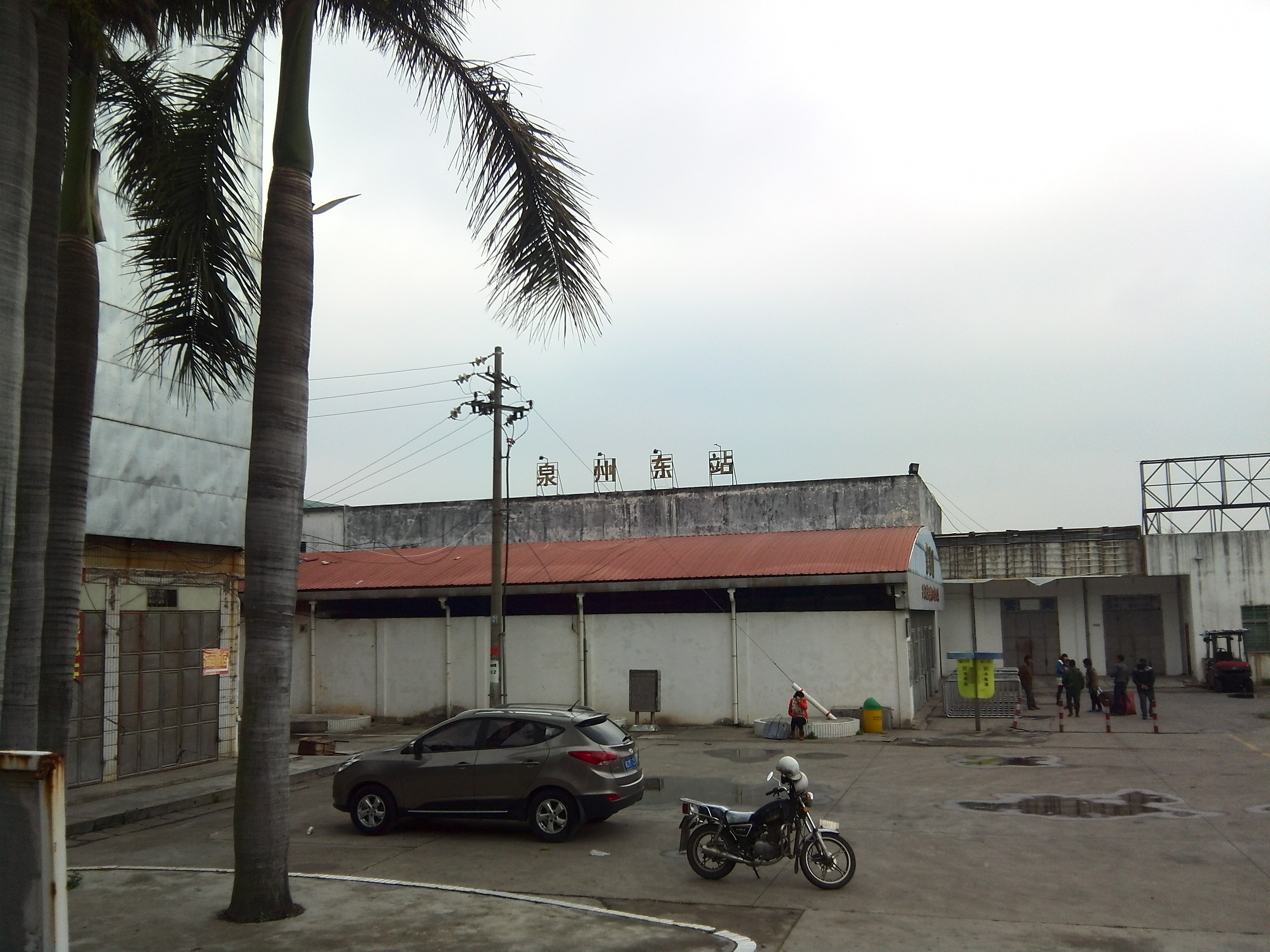

General information
- Location: Fengze District, Quanzhou, Fujian; China
- Coordinates: 24°55′24.45″N 118°38′7.3″E
- Operated by: China Railway Corporation
- Line: Zhangping–Quanzhou–Xiaocuo railway

History
- Opened: 1998
Location

Quanzhou East railway station (Chinese: 泉州东站) is a high-speed railway station in Fengze District, Quanzhou, Fujian, China. It is located on the Zhangping–Quanzhou–Xiaocuo railway.

== Service ==
Quanzhou East railway station is served only by high speed (C and D-series) trains travelling to various large cities such as Xiamen, Fuzhou, Shanghai).

== History ==
The station opened in 1998. The station was closed for passenger service on 9 December 2014., and then used for freight.

On December 20, 2019, the Fuzhou-Xiamen High-Speed Railway approved the proposal for the construction of a new square in front of Quanzhou East Station and municipal supporting projects.

On February 8, 2022, the construction of Quanzhou East Station project started. On March 13, the main structure of Quanzhou East Station was capped. On September 26, the four individual buildings of Quanzhou East Station were capped.

In February 2023, the new Quanzhou East Station building entered the final stage of renovation.

On September 28, Quanzhou East Station was put into use.

== See also ==
- Quanzhou railway station
