= Nanping–Fuzhou railway =

Railway line in Fujian, China

Nanping–Fuzhou railway or Nanfu railway (simplified Chinese: 南福铁路; traditional Chinese: 南福鐵路; pinyin: nánfú tiělù), is a railroad in eastern China between Nanping and Fuzhou in Fujian Province. The line is 186.7 km (116 mi) long and was built between 1956 and 1959.

== Other Names ==
Since 1956, the Nanping–Fuzhou railway has been referred to by at least four other names. The railway branches off of the Yingtan–Xiamen railway at the Waiyang station, near Nanping and is also called the Waiyang–Fuzhou railway or Waifu railway (外福铁路). The Waiyang Station is located in Laizhou, a township of Nanping Municipality, and the railway is also known as the Laizhou–Fuzhou railway or Laifu railway (来福铁路). In 2006, the Ministry of Railways, after upgrading the line for higher speed train service, joined most of this line with the Hengfeng–Nanping railway to create the Hengfeng–Fuzhou railway or Hengfu railway (横福铁路). A short section of the line between the Waiyang station and Nanping station is now known as the Waiyang–Nanping railway or Wainan railway (外南铁路).

== History ==
The Nanping–Fuzhou railway was built between 1956 and 1959 using surplus funds and labor from the Yingtan–Xiamen railway. In 1956, as the Yingxia railway, the first railroad built in Fujian Province, was nearing completion ahead of schedule, the deputy governor of Fujian Liang Lingguang suggested using the leftover funds and manpower to build another railway to the provincial capital Fuzhou. The Fujian Party Secretary Ye Fei agreed with the proposal and secured the approval of General Wang Zhen. The Nanping–Fuzhou railway was completed by January 1959, and was the first railway connecting Fuzhou with the rest of China's railway network.

The single-track railway was electrified in 2000.

When the high-speed Xiangtang–Putian railway opened in 2013, it made possible much faster passenger service between Fuzhou and the interior of the country. Most of the passenger service between Fuzhou and Nanchang (and other points further north and west) has been shifted from the Nanping–Fuzhou railway to the new line, the older railway only keeping a comparatively small number of slower trains.

== Rail connections ==
- Nanping: Hengfeng–Nanping railway
- Fuzhou: Wenzhou–Fuzhou railway, Fuzhou–Xiamen railway, Xiangtang–Putian railway

== See also ==
- List of railways in China
