= Shaxian, Sanming =

Shaxian 沙县区
- District
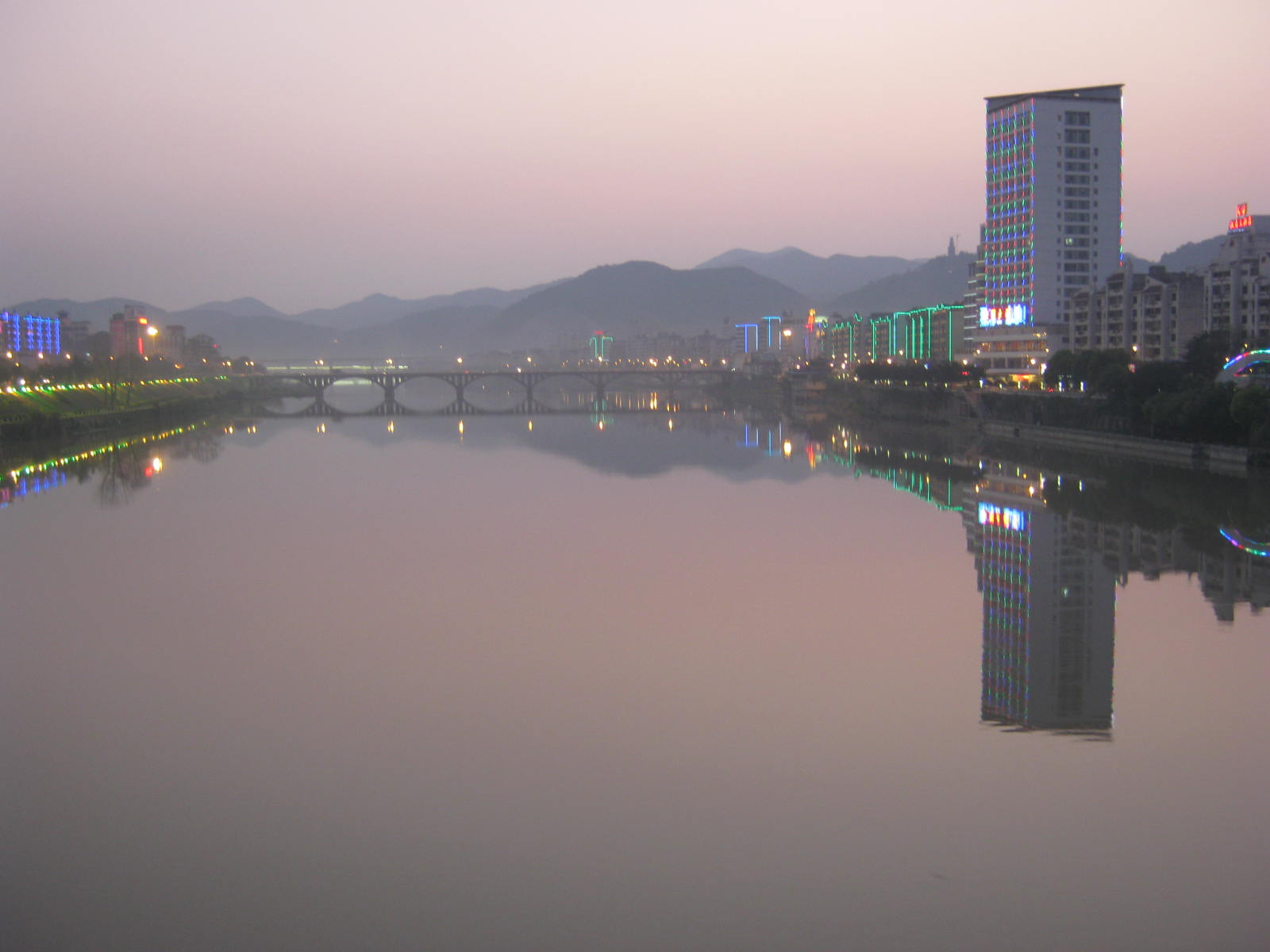
- Sha River (沙溪) shortly after sunset

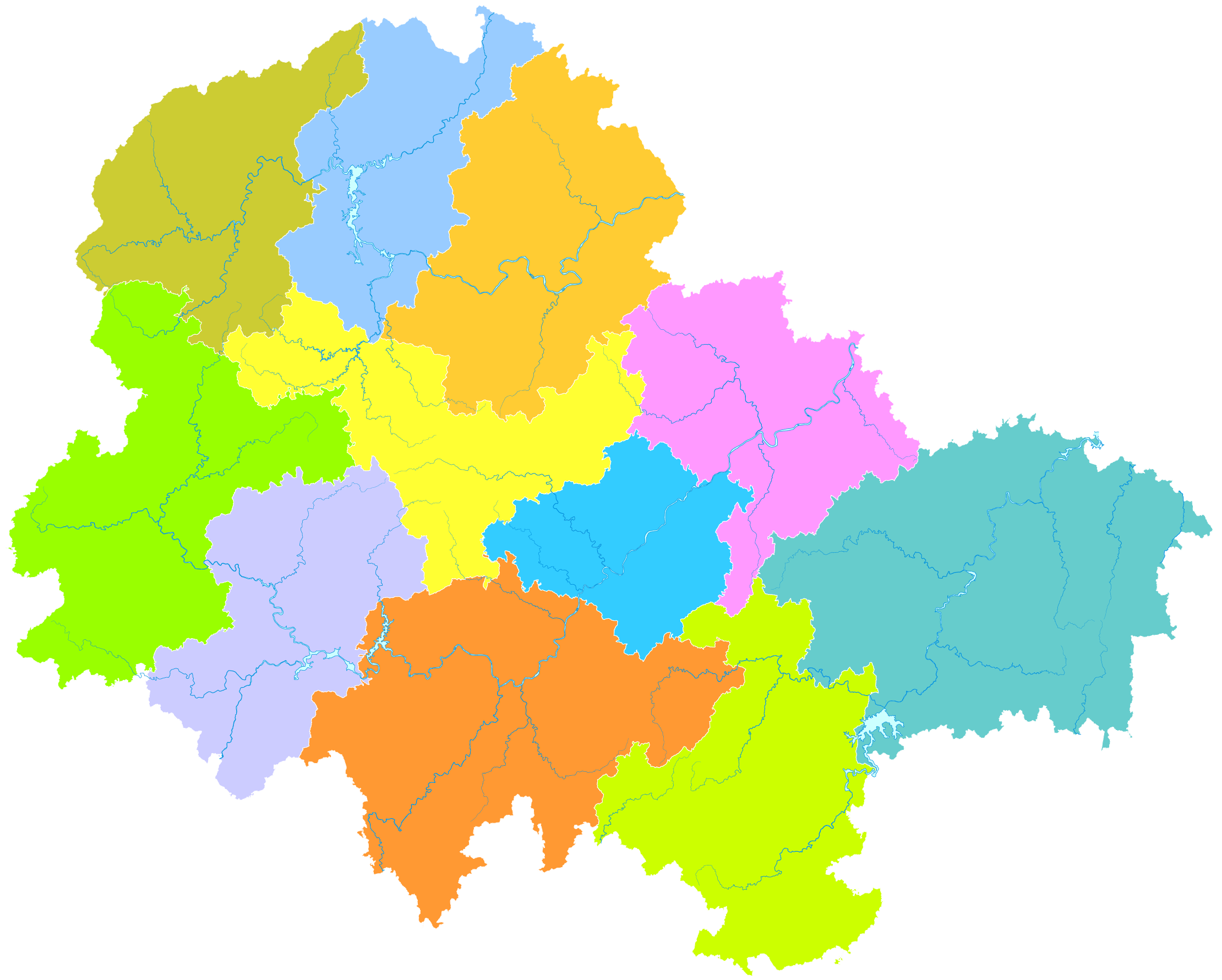
- Shaxian District in Sanming

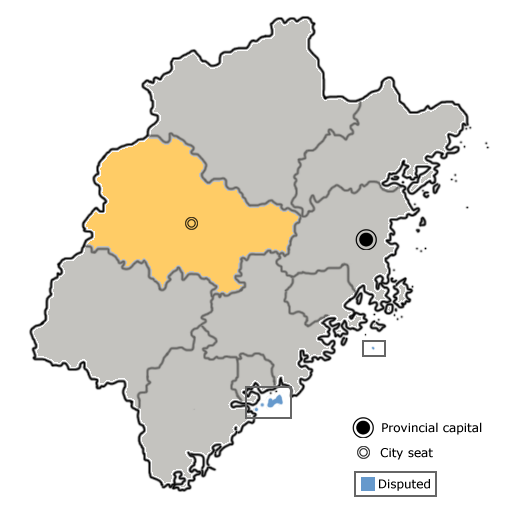
- Sanming in Fujian
- Coordinates: 26°23′49″N 117°47′31″E
- Country: People's Republic of China
- Province: Fujian
- Prefecture-level city: Sanming
- Time zone: UTC+8 (China Standard)

Shaxian District (simplified Chinese: 沙县区; traditional Chinese: 沙縣區; pinyin: Shāxiàn Qū), formerly Sha County, is a district of Sanming, Fujian Province, People's Republic of China. Shaxian District is the hometown of Shaxian delicacies, which are considered part of the food heritage of China.

== Transportation ==
Shaxian District is served by Sanming North railway station and Sanming Shaxian Airport.

== Climate ==
Climate data for Shaxian, elevation 121 m (397 ft), (1991–2020 normals, extremes 1981–present)
Month	Jan	Feb	Mar	Apr	May	Jun	Jul	Aug	Sep	Oct	Nov	Dec	Year
Record high °C (°F)	30.2 (86.4)	34.8 (94.6)	35.5 (95.9)	36.3 (97.3)	37.3 (99.1)	38.4 (101.1)	41.4 (106.5)	40.9 (105.6)	38.8 (101.8)	36.8 (98.2)	34.4 (93.9)	29.9 (85.8)	41.4 (106.5)
Mean daily maximum °C (°F)	15.5 (59.9)	17.7 (63.9)	20.8 (69.4)	26.0 (78.8)	29.4 (84.9)	32.1 (89.8)	35.3 (95.5)	34.8 (94.6)	31.9 (89.4)	27.6 (81.7)	22.4 (72.3)	17.1 (62.8)	25.9 (78.6)
Daily mean °C (°F)	10.0 (50.0)	12.1 (53.8)	15.1 (59.2)	20.0 (68.0)	23.7 (74.7)	26.6 (79.9)	28.8 (83.8)	28.4 (83.1)	25.9 (78.6)	21.3 (70.3)	16.4 (61.5)	11.2 (52.2)	20.0 (67.9)
Mean daily minimum °C (°F)	6.8 (44.2)	8.5 (47.3)	11.6 (52.9)	16.0 (60.8)	19.9 (67.8)	22.8 (73.0)	24.2 (75.6)	24.2 (75.6)	22.0 (71.6)	17.2 (63.0)	12.7 (54.9)	7.7 (45.9)	16.1 (61.1)
Record low °C (°F)	−4.2 (24.4)	−3.2 (26.2)	−2.6 (27.3)	4.0 (39.2)	10.7 (51.3)	13.6 (56.5)	20.1 (68.2)	18.9 (66.0)	12.9 (55.2)	5.4 (41.7)	−1.0 (30.2)	−6.5 (20.3)	−6.5 (20.3)
Average precipitation mm (inches)	76.4 (3.01)	114.8 (4.52)	194.8 (7.67)	196.3 (7.73)	263.8 (10.39)	282.0 (11.10)	149.2 (5.87)	160.6 (6.32)	98.2 (3.87)	63.0 (2.48)	71.3 (2.81)	56.4 (2.22)	1,726.8 (67.99)
Average precipitation days (≥ 0.1 mm)	12.5	13.6	18.0	16.8	18.0	17.9	13.0	15.8	11.0	7.6	8.3	9.9	162.4
Average snowy days	0.3	0.3	0	0	0	0	0	0	0	0	0	0.2	0.8
Average relative humidity (%)	83	82	82	80	81	82	76	77	78	78	82	82	80
Mean monthly sunshine hours	85.9	86.2	88.3	108.5	125.9	135.9	230.8	205.4	168.4	155.9	115.0	103.8	1,610
Percentage possible sunshine	26	27	24	28	30	33	55	51	46	44	36	32	36
Source: China Meteorological Administration

== Administrative divisions ==
Subdistricts:

- Fenggang Subdistrict (凤岗街道), Qiujiang Subdistrict (虬江街道)

Towns:

- Qingzhou (青州镇), Xiamao (夏茂镇), Gaosha (高砂镇), Gaoqiao (高桥镇), Fukou (富口镇), Daluo (大洛镇)

Townships:

- Nanxia Township (南霞乡), Nanyang Township (南阳乡), Zhenghu Township (郑湖乡), Huyuan Township (湖源乡)
