= Longyan–Xiamen railway =

Railway line in Fujian, China

Longyan–Xiamen railway simplified Chinese: 龙厦铁路; traditional Chinese: 龍廈鐵路; pinyin: lóngxià Tiělù
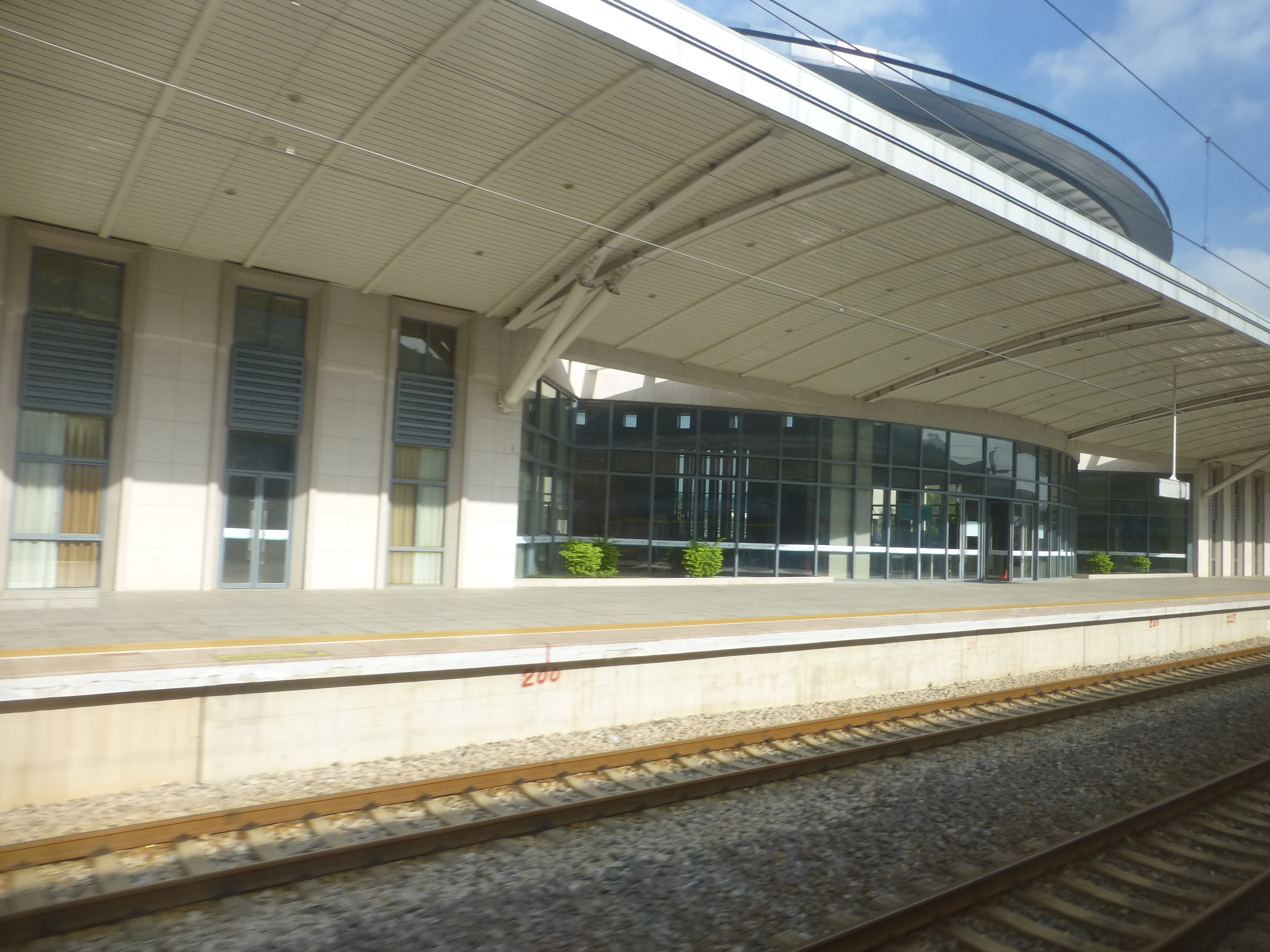
- Nanjing station

Overview
- Status: Open
- Owner: China Railway
- Locale: Fujian, China
- Termini: Longyan; Xiamen
- Stations: 6

Service
- Operator: CR Nanchang Group

Technical
- Line length: 171 km (106 mi)
- Num of tracks: 2
- Track gauge: 1,435 mm (4 ft 8 1/2 in)
- Minimum radius: 3,500 m (11,500 ft) (normal); 2,800 m (9,200 ft) (difficult)
- Electrification: 25 kV 50 Hz AC (overhead line)
- Operating speed: 200 kilometres per hour (120 mph) (design speed)
- Maximum incline: 1.3%

The Longyan–Xiamen railway (simplified Chinese: 龙厦铁路; traditional Chinese: 龍廈鐵路; pinyin: lóngxià Tiělù) is a dual-track, electrified, high-speed rail line in Fujian Province, China. The line, also known as the Longxia railway, is named after its two terminal cities Longyan and Xiamen, and has a total length of 171 km (106 mi). Construction began on December 25, 2006, and the line opened for regular operation on June 29, 2012. The line can accommodate trains traveling at speeds of up to 200 km/h (124 mph). It forms part of the Xiamen–Chongqing corridor of the eight north–south routes in China's "Eight Vertical and Eight Horizontal" network.

== Routing ==
From Longyan, in southwestern Fujian, the Longxia railway runs to the southeast, crossing the Boping Mountains, and following the Western Stream to the Longhai railway station near Zhangzhou (at 24°27′00″N 117°41′30″E), to the west of the new Zhangzhou railway station. From the Longhai station, the Longxia line runs parallel to the Yingtan–Xiamen railway to the Xinglin station on the Xiamen coast. The Longyan to Longhai section of the line is 111 km (69 mi) in length. The Longhai to Xinglin section, is 60 km (37 mi) in length, and was funded as part of the Xiamen–Shenzhen railway, with which the Longxia line will share track when that line opens.

The Longyan–Xiamen railway is the first railway to enter Fujian's Nanjing County. The two stations within the county are "Nanjing" (which, however, is not particularly close to the county seat, Shancheng) and Longshan. They serve the county's eastern and northern part.

== Rail connections ==
- Longyan: Zhangping–Longchuan railway, Ganzhou–Ruijin–Longyan railway, Ganzhou–Longyan railway
- Zhangzhou: Yingtan–Xiamen railway, Xiamen–Shenzhen railway
- Xiamen: Yingtan–Xiamen railway, Fuzhou–Xiamen railway, Xiamen–Shenzhen railway

== See also ==
- List of railways in China
