= Longyan railway station =

Railway station in Longyan, Fujian

Longyan 龙岩
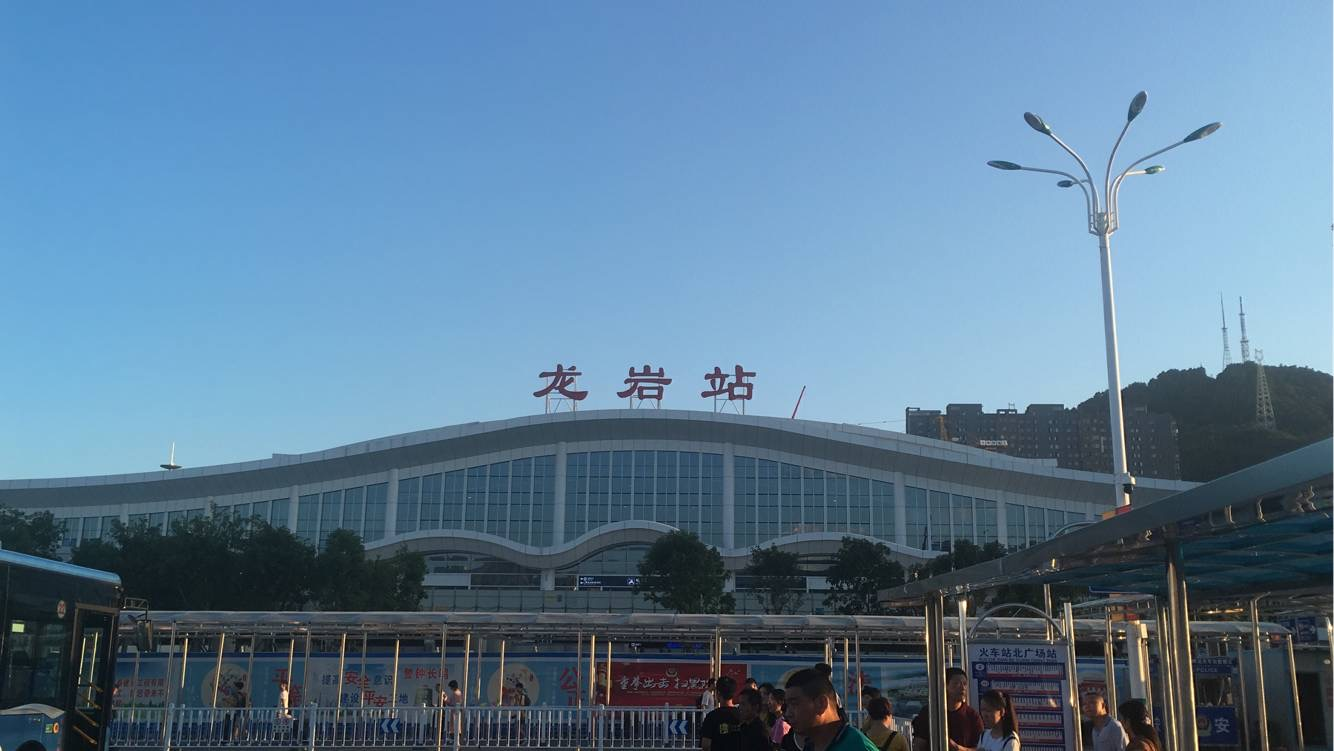

General information
- Location: Xinluo District, Longyan, Fujian; China
- Coordinates: 25.1007°N 117.0006°E
- Lines: Zhangping–Longchuan railway; Ganzhou–Longyan railway; Longyan–Xiamen railway; Nanping–Longyan railway; Longyan–Longchuan high-speed railway
Location

Longyan railway station (Chinese: 龙岩站; pinyin: Lóngyán zhàn) is a railway station in Xinluo District, Longyan, Fujian, China.

== History ==
The station was opened on 18 January 2003. The station began reconstruction in 2016. On 20 April 2018, a new station building was opened. As part of the project, the number of platforms was increased.

== Gallery ==
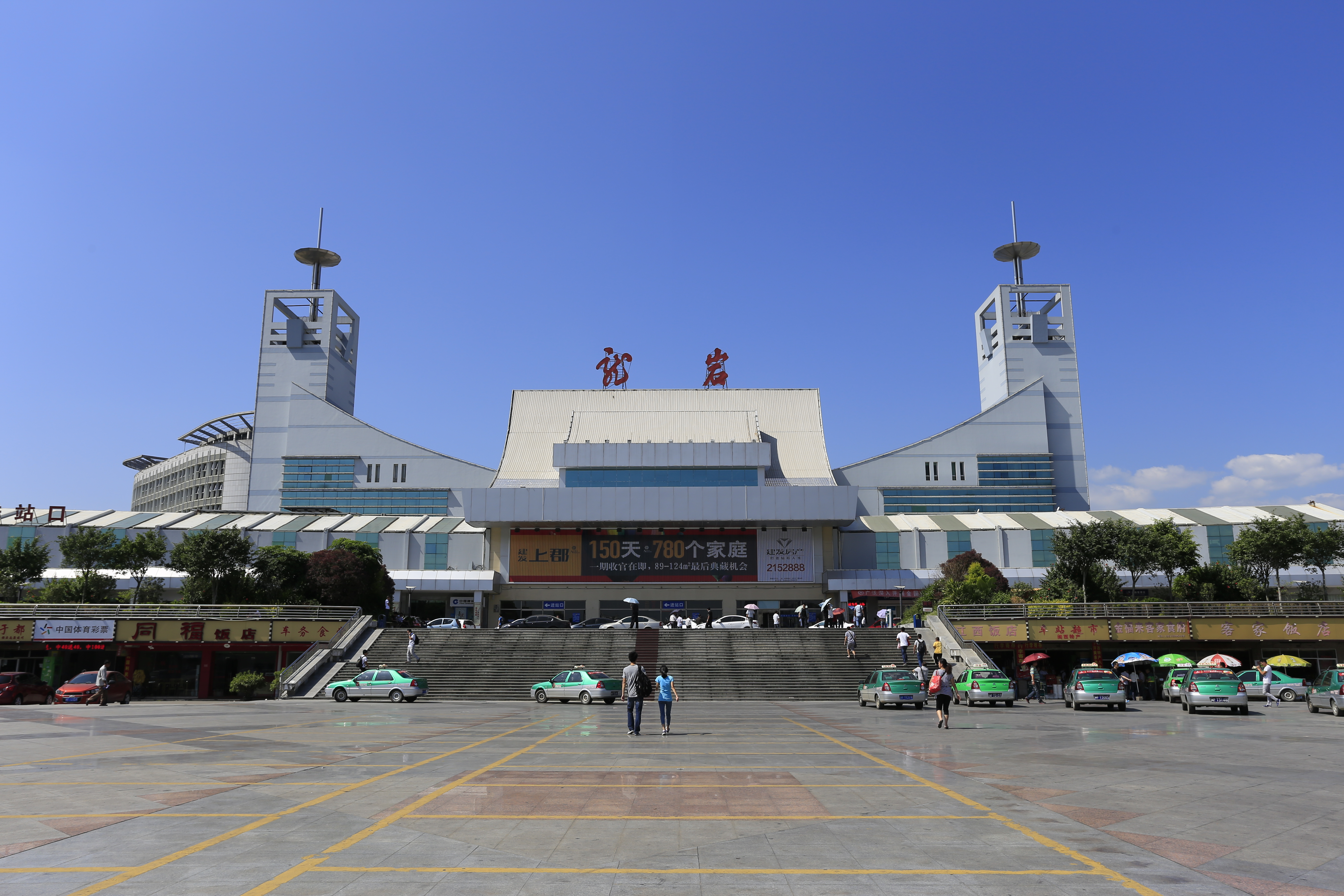
Longyan Station Building (2013)

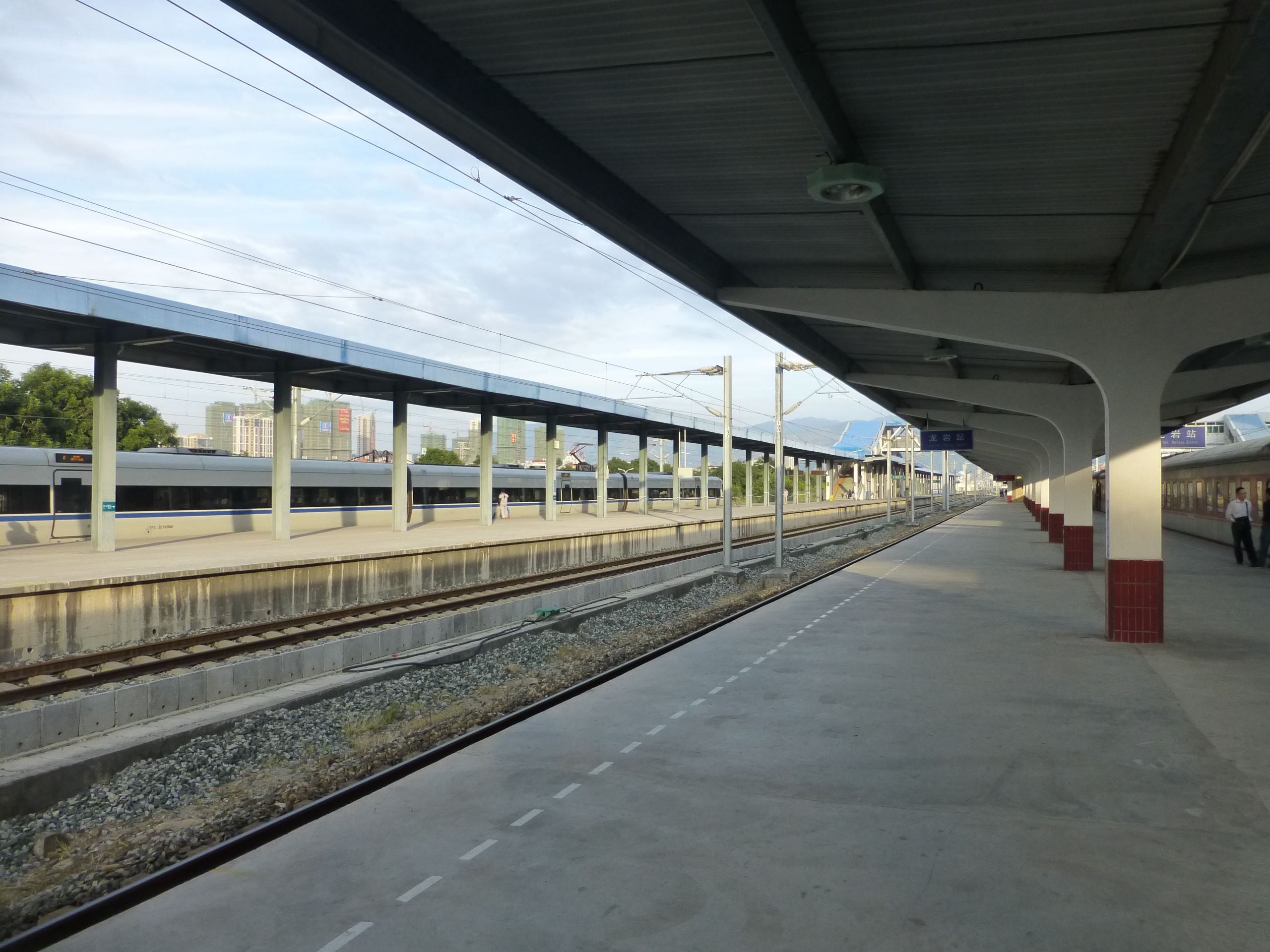
Train platform (2015)
