= Zhangping–Longchuan railway =

Railway line in China

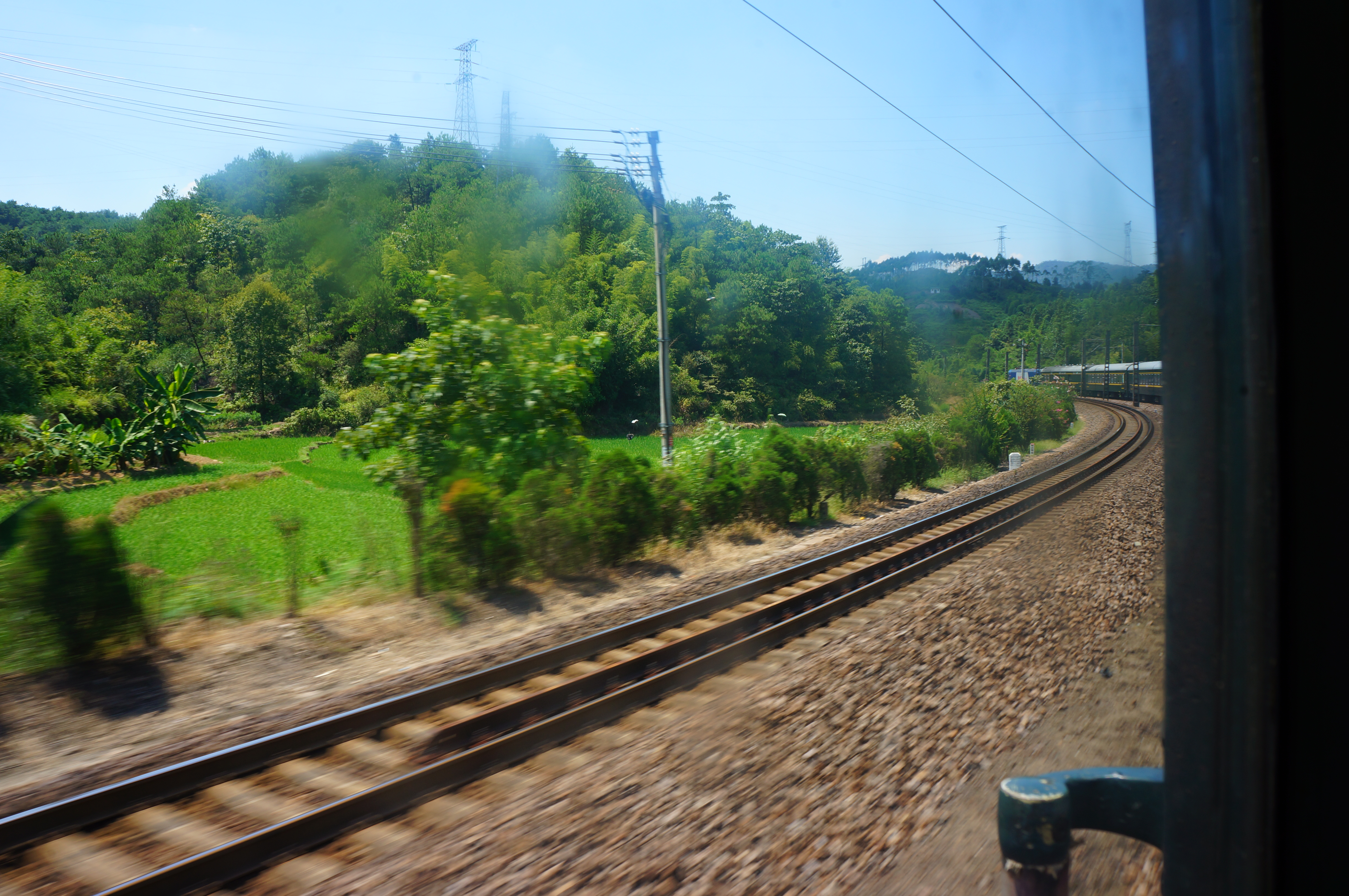

Overview
- Native name: 漳龙铁路
- Owner: China Railway
- Locale: Fujian and Guangdong, China

Service
- Type: Heavy rail Regional rail
- Operator(s): CR Nanchang and CR Guangzhou

History
- Opened: 2000

Technical
- Line length: 374 km (232 mi)
- Track gauge: 1,435 mm (4 ft 8 1/2 in)

The Zhangping–Longchuan railway (simplified Chinese: 漳龙铁路; traditional Chinese: 漳龍鐵路; pinyin: zhānglóng Tiělù), also known as the Zhanglong railway, is a railway linking Zhangping, Fujian Province, and Longchuan County, Guangdong, in southeastern China. The line has a total length of 374 km (232 mi) and combines separately constructed railways linking Zhangping, Longyan, Kanshi, Meizhou, and Longchuan.

== Line description ==
The Zhangping–Longchuan railway consists of the following railways:

- The Zhangping–Longyan–Kanshi railway or Zhanglongkan railway (漳龙坎铁路), 98 km (61 mi) in length, between Zhangping and Kanshi in Fujian. The Zhanglongkan railway itself consists of the Zhangping–Longyan and the Longyan–Kanshi railways.
  - The Zhangping–Longyan railway, also called the Zhanglong railway (漳龙铁路), 68 km (42 mi) in length, was built from 1958 to 1961 as a spur off the Yingtan–Xiamen railway to transport coal from southwestern Fujian. This line should not be confused for the Zhangping–Longchuan railway, of which it is a constituent section.
  - The Longyan–Kanshi railway or Longkan railway (龙坎铁路), 36 km (22 mi) in length, was built from 1970 to 1972, to extend the Zhangping–Longyan railway to Kanshi in Yongding County, Fujian.
- The Meizhou–Kanshi railway or Meikan railway (梅坎铁路), 147 km (91 mi) in length, between Meizhou, Guangdong and Kanshi, Fujian, completed in 1999 and began operation in September 2000. The Meikan railway was the first rail link between the two provinces.
- The Longchuan to Meizhou section of the Guangzhou–Meizhou–Shantou railway, 147 km (91 mi) in length, between Longchuan, Guangdong and Kanshi, Fujian, completed in 1995.

The Zhangping–Longchuan railway, which was created with the opening of the Meizhou–Kanshi railway, shortened the rail travel distance from Fuzhou to Guangzhou by over 500 km (311 mi).

== Rail connections ==
- Zhangping: Yingtan–Xiamen railway, Zhangping–Quanzhou–Xiaocuo railway
- Longyan: Longyan–Xiamen railway, Ganzhou–Longyan railway
- Longchuan: Guangzhou–Meizhou–Shantou railway

== See also ==
- List of railways in China
