= Yanping East railway station =

Railway station in Nanping, Fujian

Yanping East 延平东
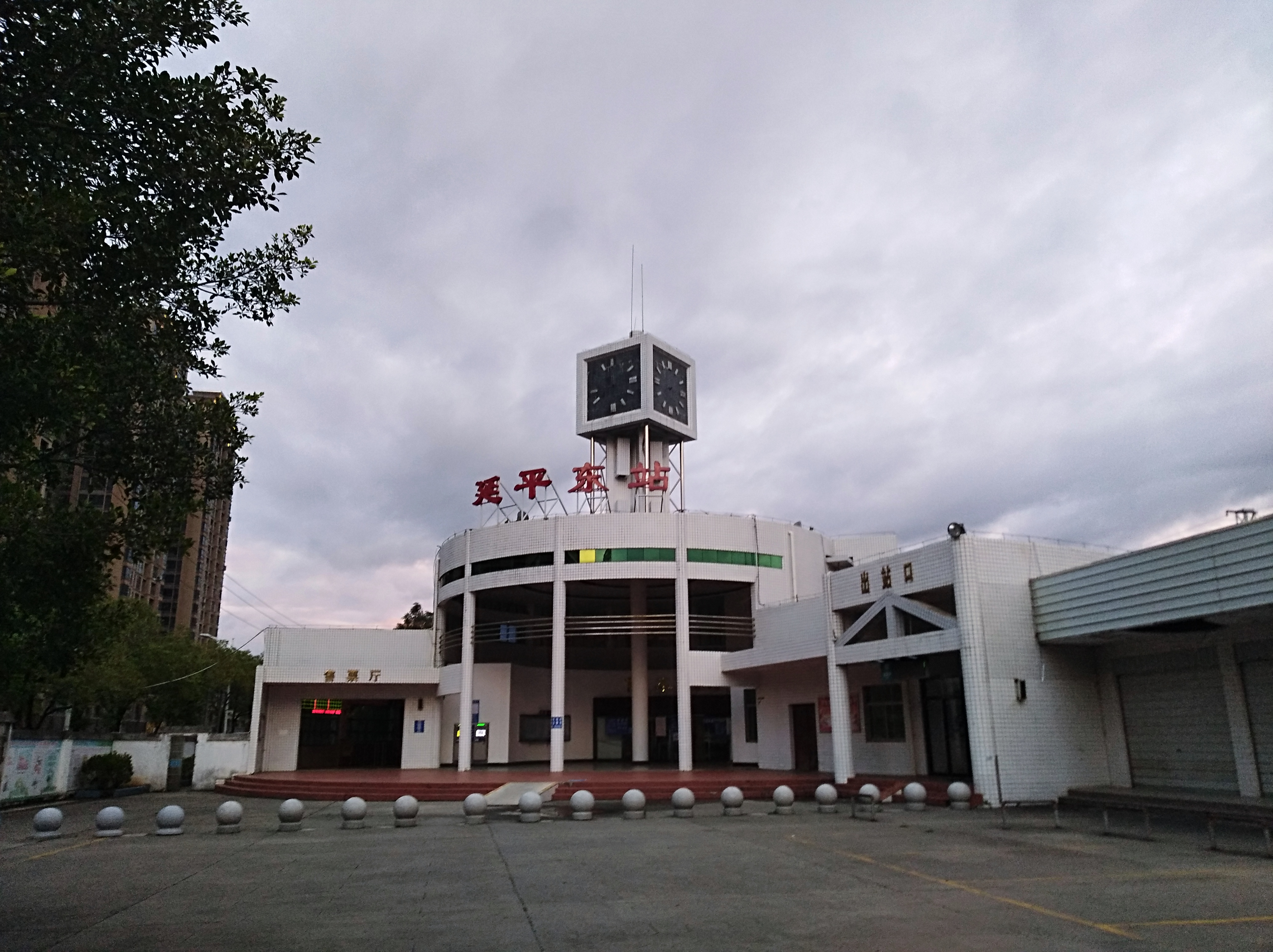
- Exterior of the station

General information
- Location: Yanping District, Nanping, Fujian; China
- Coordinates: 26°37′46″N 118°12′35″E
- Lines: Nanping–Fuzhou railway; Hengfeng–Nanping railway
Location

Yanping East railway station (Chinese: 延平东站) is a railway station in Yanping District, Nanping, Fujian, China.

== History ==
On 11 December 2019, the name of this station was changed from Nanping South (Chinese: 南平南) to Yanping East.

Preceding station	China Railway	Following station
Shuinan towards Laizhou	Nanping–Fuzhou railway	Yangdanzi towards Fuzhou
