= Wuyishan =

Wuyishan (武夷山) can refer to the following locations in China:

- Wuyi Mountains, of northwestern Fujian
- Wuyishan Airport
- Wuyishan, Fujian, county-level city of Nanping
- Wuyishan, Jiangxi, town in Yanshan County
- Wuyishan National Nature Reserve, part of the Wuyi Mountains UNESCO World Heritage site; it includes:
  - Fujian Wuyishan Biosphere Reserve, UNESCO Biosphere Reserve, in the Fujian portion of the Wuyi Mountains
  - Jiangxi Wuyishan Biosphere Reserve, UNESCO Biosphere Reserve, in the Jiangxi portion of the Wuyi Mountains
