= Shuiji =

Shuiji 水吉镇
- Town
- Location in Fujian Shuiji (China)
- Coordinates: 27°24′47″N 118°20′57″E
- Country: People's Republic of China
- Province: Fujian
- Prefecture-level city: Nanping
- District: Jianyang
- Elevation: 149 m (489 ft)
- Time zone: UTC+8 (China Standard)
- Postal code: 354200
- Area code: 0599

Shuiji (Chinese: 水吉; pinyin: Shuǐjí; Pe̍h-ōe-jī: Chúi-kiat) is a town of Jianyang District, Nanping, in northern Fujian province, China.

== See also ==
- List of township-level divisions of Fujian
- Wuyi New Area
