= WUS =

WUS may refer to:

- Wuyishan Airport (IATA code WUS)
- World University Service, international organisation
