= Fujian Nanping First Secondary School of Jianyang District =

Coordinates: 27.3290°N 118.1193°E

Fujian Nanping First Secondary School of Jianyang District 福建省建阳第一中学

Location
- Jianyang District in Nanping City, Fujian Province on the 3rd West Bridge Road

Information
- Type: Public secondary schools
- Motto: Everything for tomorrow
- Established: 1919
- School district: Jianyang District, Nanping City, Fujian Province
- Principal: Huang Jingqing
- Faculty: 210
- Grades: High School
- Enrollment: About 3000
- Area: 80000m²
- Building Area: 41017m²
- Publication: Red Sunset
- Website: Official website

Fujian Nanping First Secondary School of Jianyang District, or Fujian First Secondary School of Jianyang(福建省建阳第一中学), is a school in Jianyang District, Nanping, Fujian Province, China.

The school was founded in 1919. Due to the Second World War, funds became insufficient; restoration took place in 1941. It now covers over 80,000 square meters. Now as an independent high school, there are 46 classes, more than 2,600 students, 200 faculty members, of whom there are 2 special teachers and 81 senior teachers.

The school adheres to socialist ideology. Jianyang aims to promote scientific and technological education, and has made achievements in counseling students to participate in academic competitions, innovation abilities of students to form their own distinctive characteristics. Since 2003, high school students in a discipline Jianyang Orsay CCP won RMB 2 million in prizes. For the achievements of its students, Jianyang was awarded the title "Fujian Province Science and Technology Education Base school" by the local education authorities.

== History ==
Founded in 1919, the school was known as "Jianyang sixth national schools" It was later closed due to financial difficulties. In 1941 recovery took place and the school changed its name to its current one.

In 1978 the school was selected by Fujian Provincial Government as one of six key middle schools of the province's first run. In 1993, it was recognized as the provincial standard secondary school.

== Mission ==
The school's motto is 'Everything for tomorrow'. In the educational process, the school aims to enhance students' creative abilities, as well as their moral education.

== Teaching Building ==
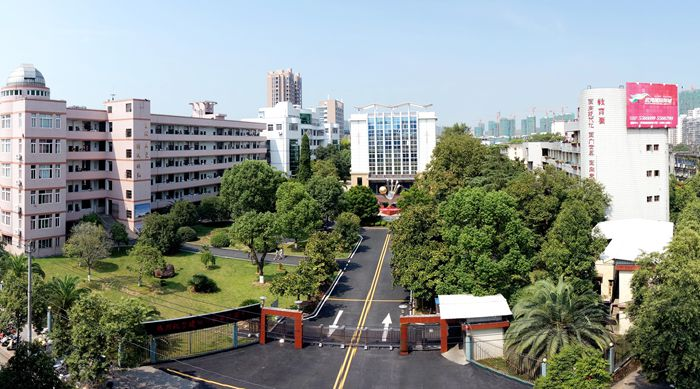
Overview of jianyang first secondary school

== Recognition ==
In addition, the school also has been awarded the "Fujian green school", "Fujian small civic morality art collective," "Fujian social security comprehensive management of advanced units", "advanced unit in Fujian Province, the Communist Youth League school," "Fujian Youth Technology Education Outstanding Contribution Award "," Fujian physics contest organized Outstanding Contribution Award "," Fujian to build advanced educational system of party and government workers 'Jiaogongzhijia' "a number of provincial collective honors.

Full of vigor and vitality of Jianyang CKS toward the grand goal of having a demonstration, experimental, Fujian distinctive class school forward. Senior high school, college entrance examination has made remarkable achievements, praise and trust of the community. Since 2005 the college entrance examination, which won first prize in Nanping similar comprehensive school. Teachers and students at all levels to participate in various disciplines have been winning the race (one of whom had represented China at the 2003 World Physics Olympiad). More than 100 teachers received a second prize at the national, provincial, municipal Lessons, courseware and other competitions, there are more than 150 papers, classroom text Record and teaching cases of national, provincial, municipal, second prize, There are five topics provincial, city, second prize, more than 30 students in the country, a provincial competition, second prize. More than 350 students were Nanping municipal contests first, second and third prize.

== Prospects ==
Facing the new century, the school's guiding ideology is: hold high the great banner of Deng Xiaoping Theory, fully implement the Party's education policy, to promote quality education, accelerate reform, accelerate development. Rely on faculty to fully tap the potential of people to mobilize the enthusiasm and initiative of teachers. Rely Keyanxingjiao, strengthen management science, education and scientific research and exploration, and comprehensively improve the quality of education, efforts to cultivate and foster socialist builders and successors. School's educational goals: the school into scientific management ethos rigorous, high quality, talent, social reputation is good, with demonstration, experimental, unique, modern schools. School training objectives are: to train students to be politically firm, moral, good solid foundation, quality, hard march, innovation, personality sound new generation. On the occasion of Jianyang a restored school seventieth anniversary of the occasion, in order to achieve the goal of building a modern school, school faculty teaching and research are firmly together, and strive to improve the educational level and quality. At the same time, will gradually assemble modern educational technology and equipment. Due to the economic development of less developed northern Fujian, the current shortage of school funding difficulties facing the development, school construction and development loans, may my previous home and alumni, as always concern and support for his alma mater's education, make contribution to the development of his alma mater. We are convinced that, in the intensive care alumni, the community, Jianyang one campus will be more beautiful, Jianyang one tomorrow will be even more brilliant.

== Famous Alumnus ==
Dr. Wenjun

== Famous Teacher ==
Qiu Shouxiong, Qi Zujuan
