= Wuyishan, Fujian =

Wuyishan 武夷山市
- County-level city
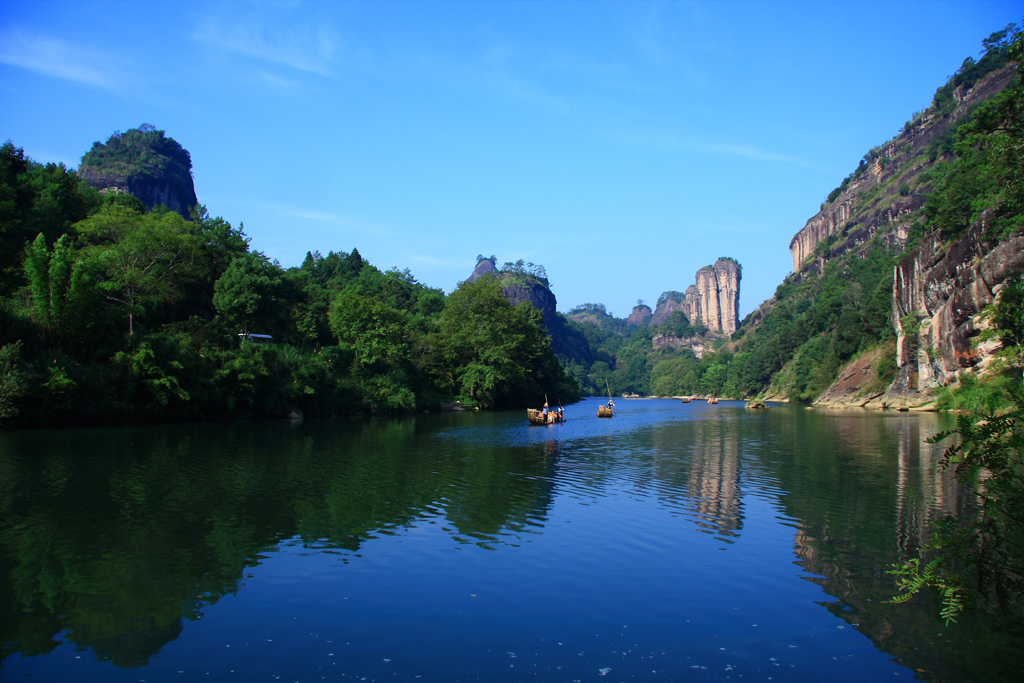

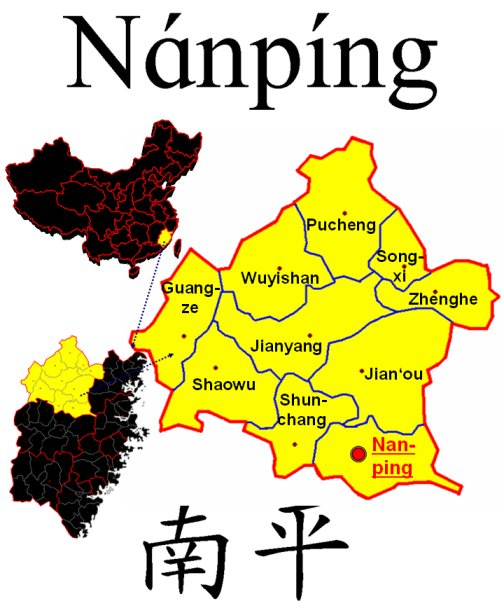
- Location of Wuyishan City within Nanping City

- Location in Fujian
- Coordinates (Wuyishan City government): 27°45′23″N 118°02′07″E
- Country: People's Republic of China
- Province: Fujian
- Prefecture-level city: Nanping
- Subdistrict: Chong'an Subdistrict

Government
  - CPC City Committee Secretary: Ma Bigang

Area
  - County-level city: 2,912 km^{2} (1,124 sq mi)

Population (2020)
  - County-level city: 259,668
  - Density: 89.17/km^{2} (231.0/sq mi)
  - Urban: 159,308
- Time zone: UTC+8 (China Standard)
- Website: www.wys.gov.cn

Wuyishan City (Chinese: 武夷山市; pinyin: Wǔyíshān Shì) is a county-level city in the municipal region of Nanping, in the northwest of Fujian, People's Republic of China, which borders Jiangxi to the northwest. It corresponds to the former Chong'an County.

== Natural and cultural heritage ==
A local subsection of the Wuyishan Mountain range, which forms the entirety of the geological and political divide between the provinces of Fujian and Jiangxi, is a front-rank national park called simply Wuyi Mountains. Since 1999 the park zone has been recognised by UNESCO as part of the world's natural and cultural heritage.

Cultural sites within the zone include the original cultivation ground of the Da Hong Pao tea variety, and a villa retreat used by Zhu Xi, a Confucian revivalist scholar-official of the rump or Southern Song Empire.

South of the zone, just short of the city's border with Jianyang District, is a major archaeological excavation of the vanished State of Yue (越).

Not far from Wuyishan, the Jiyufang Laolong kiln (吉玉坊老龍窯), located in a village near the town of Shuiji, has been able to restart production of Jian ware using original clay.

== Administration ==
The city executive, legislature and judiciary are in Chong'an Subdistrict (崇安街道), together with the CPC and PSB branches.

There are two other subdistricts:

- Xinfeng (新丰街道) – formerly Chengdong Township (城东乡)
- Wuyi (武夷街道) – formerly Wuyi Town (武夷镇)

=== Towns ===
- Xingcun (星村镇) – embarkation for raft tours down the Jiuqu Brook (九曲溪)
- Xingtian (兴田镇)
- Wufu (五夫镇)

=== Townships ===
- Shangmei (上梅乡)
- Wutun (吴屯乡)
- Langu (岚谷乡)
- Yangzhuang (洋庄乡)

== Climate ==
Climate data for Wuyishan, elevation 222 m (728 ft), (1991–2020 normals, extremes 1981–present)
Month	Jan	Feb	Mar	Apr	May	Jun	Jul	Aug	Sep	Oct	Nov	Dec	Year
Record high °C (°F)	26.0 (78.8)	29.5 (85.1)	33.6 (92.5)	34.0 (93.2)	35.4 (95.7)	36.8 (98.2)	40.5 (104.9)	41.2 (106.2)	38.1 (100.6)	36.6 (97.9)	31.8 (89.2)	26.0 (78.8)	41.2 (106.2)
Mean daily maximum °C (°F)	13.2 (55.8)	15.3 (59.5)	18.3 (64.9)	23.8 (74.8)	27.7 (81.9)	30.0 (86.0)	33.7 (92.7)	33.5 (92.3)	31.0 (87.8)	26.7 (80.1)	21.1 (70.0)	15.6 (60.1)	24.2 (75.5)
Daily mean °C (°F)	8.1 (46.6)	10.2 (50.4)	13.3 (55.9)	18.4 (65.1)	22.5 (72.5)	25.3 (77.5)	28.0 (82.4)	27.6 (81.7)	25.1 (77.2)	20.5 (68.9)	15.1 (59.2)	9.7 (49.5)	18.7 (65.6)
Mean daily minimum °C (°F)	4.9 (40.8)	6.8 (44.2)	9.9 (49.8)	14.7 (58.5)	18.9 (66.0)	22.2 (72.0)	24.0 (75.2)	23.9 (75.0)	21.2 (70.2)	16.2 (61.2)	11.1 (52.0)	5.9 (42.6)	15.0 (59.0)
Record low °C (°F)	−6.0 (21.2)	−4.7 (23.5)	−4.2 (24.4)	2.7 (36.9)	7.5 (45.5)	11.6 (52.9)	19.7 (67.5)	16.9 (62.4)	12.3 (54.1)	2.3 (36.1)	−1.5 (29.3)	−7.4 (18.7)	−7.4 (18.7)
Average precipitation mm (inches)	81.5 (3.21)	103.3 (4.07)	209.5 (8.25)	225.4 (8.87)	277.1 (10.91)	438.2 (17.25)	204.4 (8.05)	150.7 (5.93)	84.3 (3.32)	45.4 (1.79)	84.9 (3.34)	62.5 (2.46)	1,967.2 (77.45)
Average precipitation days (≥ 0.1 mm)	12.6	12.9	18.6	17.3	17.2	19.4	14.1	14.9	9.4	6.4	8.5	8.9	160.2
Average snowy days	1.1	0.7	0.2	0	0	0	0	0	0	0	0	0.4	2.4
Average relative humidity (%)	75	77	79	78	79	83	77	77	74	71	74	73	76
Mean monthly sunshine hours	94.9	86.1	89.3	107.6	120.2	104.8	201.7	187.9	168.8	165.2	133.6	129.1	1,589.2
Percentage possible sunshine	29	27	24	28	29	25	48	47	46	47	42	40	36
Source: China Meteorological Administration

== Population ==
As early as the ancient period, people began to settle in Wuyishan. By the Ming Dynasty, the total population of Wuyishan had reached nearly 40,000. After the founding of the People's Republic of China, the population of Wuyishan grew rapidly until the late 1970s. However, by the early 1980s, the growth rate slowed due to the influence of the family planning policy.

According to the 6th National Census in 2010, Wuyishan had a resident population of 233,557, with 51.94% male and 48.06% female. The population residing in urban areas was 122,851, accounting for 52.60%.

According to data from the 7th National Census, as of November 1, 2020, Wuyishan had a resident population of 259,668.

== Ethnicity ==
Due to wars, the early dominant ethnic groups in Wuyishan gradually declined and were assimilated by the Han Chinese. Today, the ethnic composition of Wuyishan is predominantly Han, with only a very small minority population. According to the 6th National Census, there were 1,941 people from minority ethnic groups in Wuyishan, accounting for 0.83% of the total population.

== Transportation ==
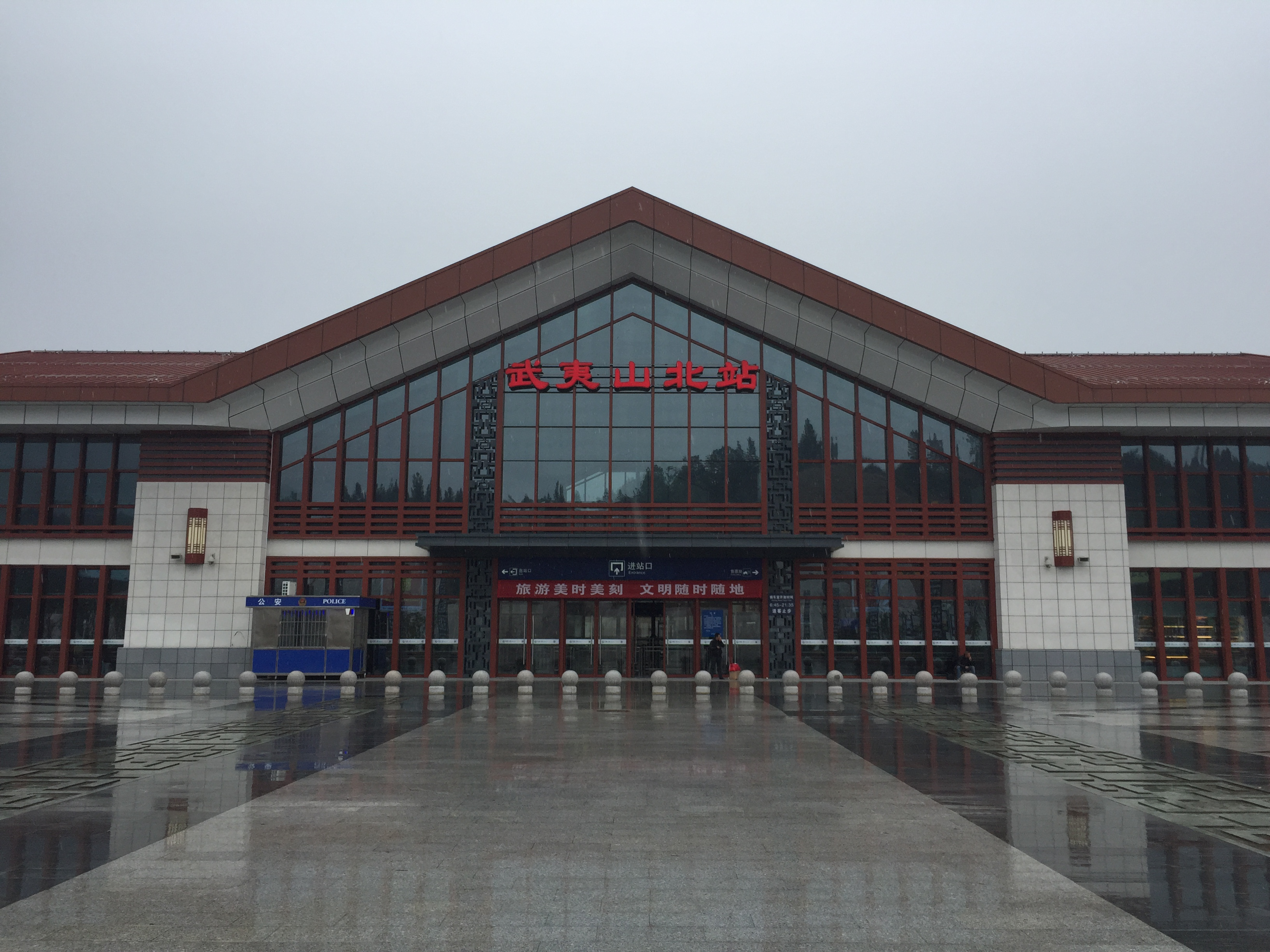
Wuyishan North Railway Station serves the city of Wuyishan.

The Wuyishan Airport serves the Wuyishan area. The Hengfeng–Nanping Railway and Hefei–Fuzhou High-Speed Railway pass through Wuyishan. The Wuyi Tram, a 26.4-kilometer tram line with ten stations has provided service between Nanpingshi Railway Station and Wuyishan scenic area since 2021. As of July 2025, a second line is under construction and a third line is being planned, alongside a roughly 42 kilometer expansion to the existing route.

== Specialty ==
- Langu Smoked Goose (岚谷熏鹅)
- Paddy Carp (稻花鱼)
- Ching Ming Fruit (清明果)
- Gui Jie (簋芥: transliteration)

== Sister cities ==
- Honolulu, Hawaii, United States: 12 July 2005
- Blue Mountains, New South Wales, Australia: 30 June 2009

== See also ==
- List of administrative divisions of Fujian
- Wuyi New Area
- Wuyi Mountains
