= Futun River =

River in Fujian, China

Coordinates: 26°35′07″N 118°01′12″E

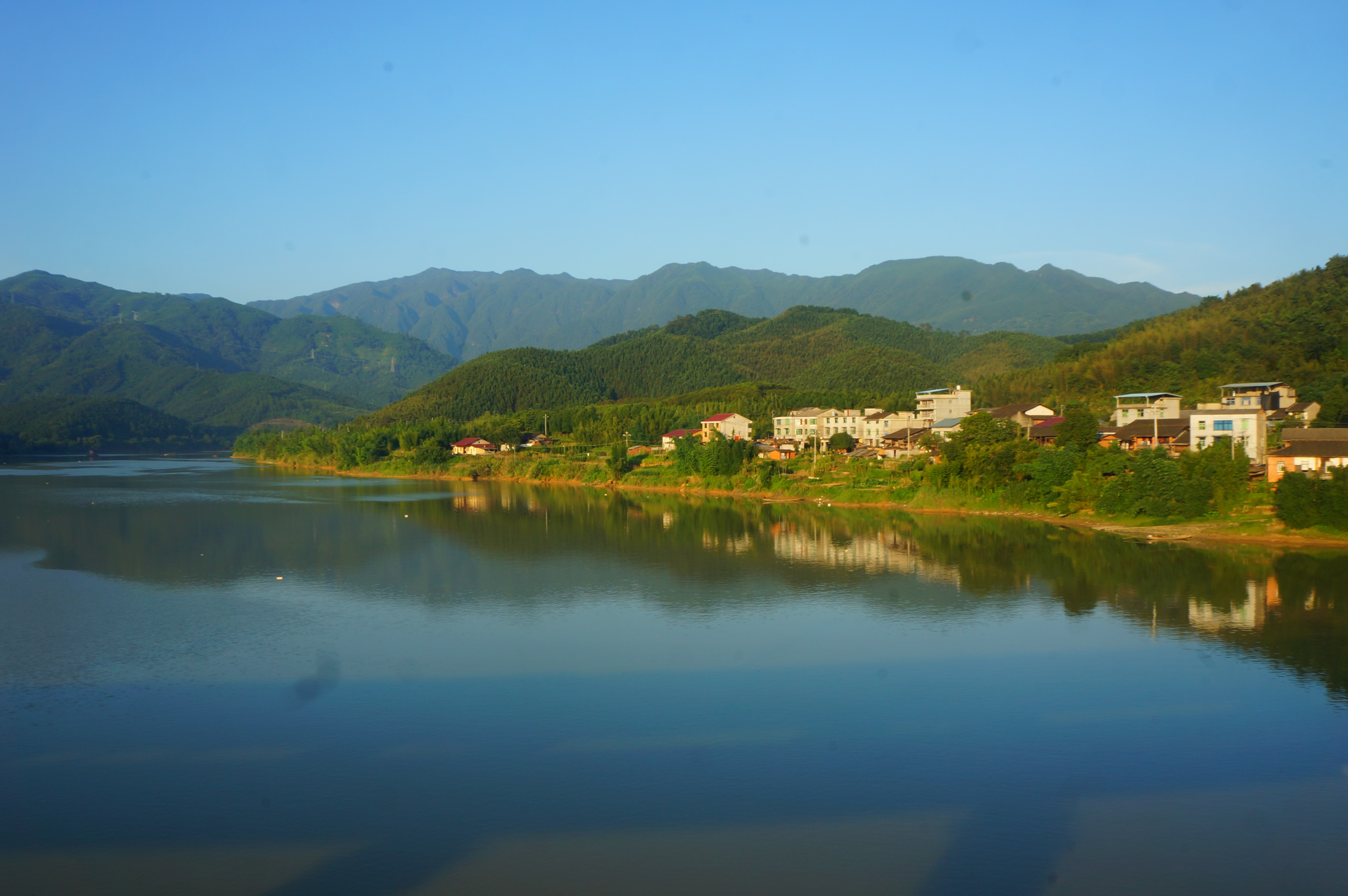

The Hutun River is a river in Fujian Province, in the East China region of the People's Republic of China.

== Geography ==
The river is 285 kilometres (177 mi) in length, with its mouth. The Hutun's 13,733 square kilometres (5,302 sq mi) drainage basin is within Fujian province.

The Hutun River's headwaters are in the Wuyi Mountains. It is a tributary of the Min River which flows into the Taiwan Strait.

== See also ==
- List of rivers of China
- Rivers of Fujian
- Min River (Fujian)
