= Shuinan railway station =

Railway station in Nanping, Fujian

Shuinan 水南
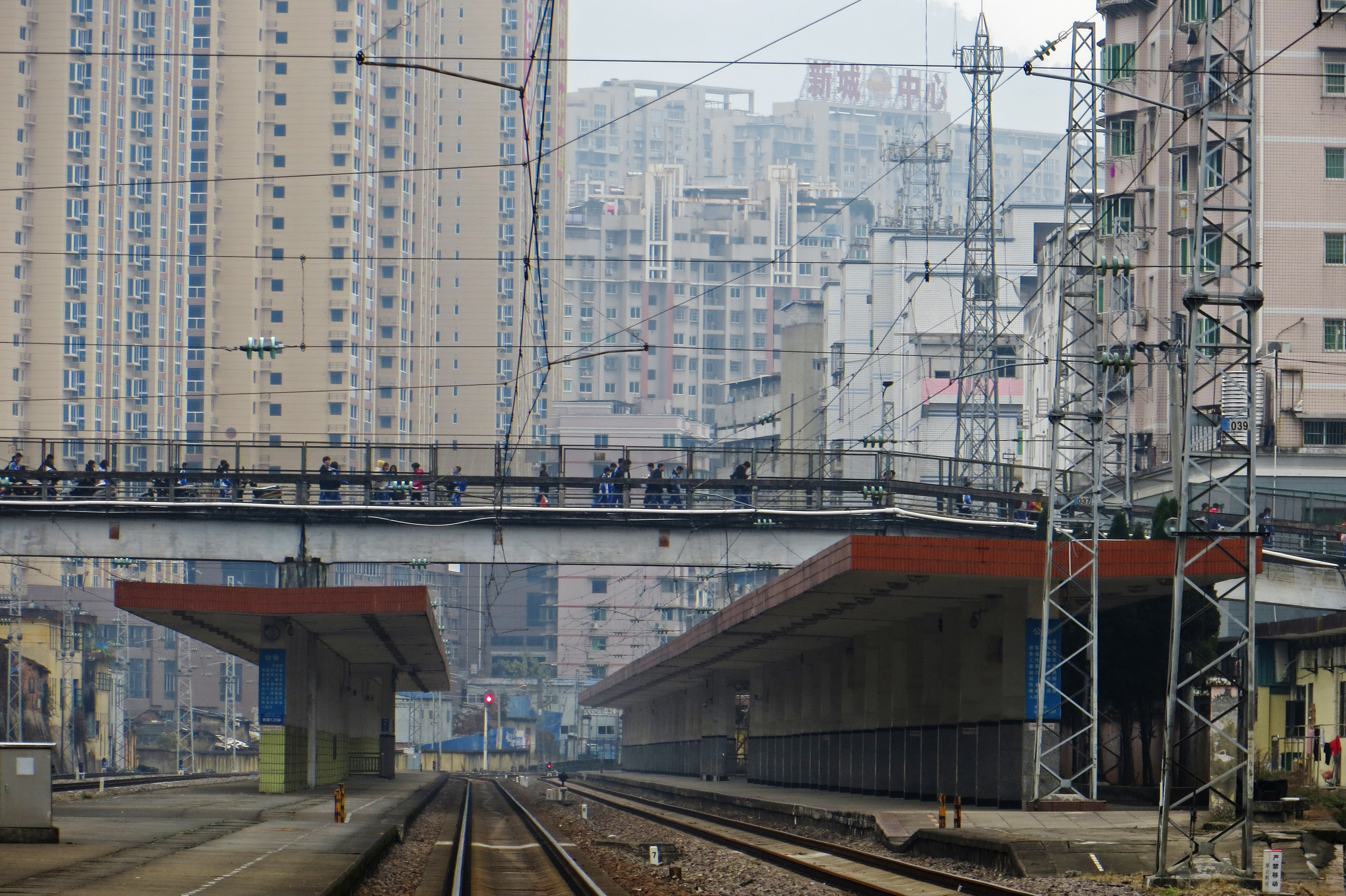

General information
- Location: Yanping District, Nanping, Fujian; China
- Coordinates: 26°37′31″N 118°10′23″E

History
- Closed: 9 January 2016

Shuinan railway station (Chinese: 水南站) is a railway station in Yanping District, Nanping, Fujian, China. It handles freight trains, and previously handled passenger services.

== History ==
The final passenger service ran on 9 January 2016. On 15 December 2019, the name of this station was changed from Nanping (Chinese: 南平) to Shuinan.
