= Laizhou railway station =

Railway station in Nanping, Fujian

Laizhou 来舟
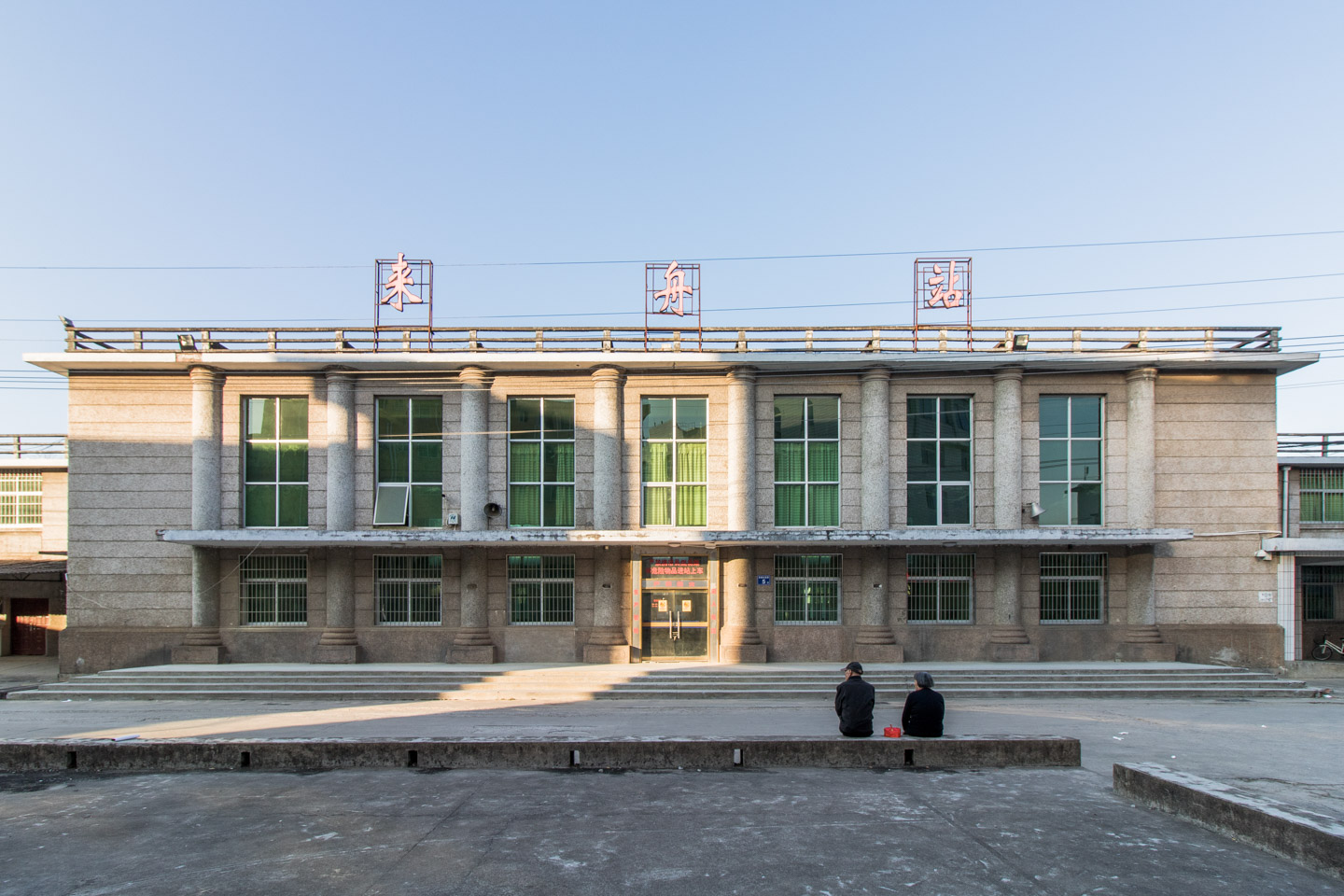

General information
- Location: Yanping District, Nanping, Fujian; China
- Coordinates: 26.629113°N 117.981202°E
- Line(s): Yingtan–Xiamen railway; Nanping–Fuzhou railway

History
- Opened: 1956
- Closed: January 2016 (passengers)

Laizhou railway station (Chinese: 来舟站) is a railway station in Yanping District, Nanping, Fujian, China. It is currently used exclusively by freight trains, but previously it handled passengers.

== Name ==
On 13 December 2004, the name of the station was changed from Laizhou to Nanping North. However, on 1 July 2006, the name was reverted to Laizhou reportedly due to passenger confusion.

== History ==
The station was built with the Yingtan–Xiamen railway and opened in 1956.

In the 1970s, the station was upgraded and expanded. A turning wye was replaced with a turntable.

Laizhou was regularly used as a reversal point for services arriving from the east on the Nanping–Fuzhou railway and continuing south on the Yingtan–Xiamen railway, or vice-versa. A chord between the two lines was opened in December 2012 which most services began using, eliminating a reversal and shortening the journey by 8 kilometres (5.0 mi).

Passenger services were withdrawn in January 2016 however the station still contains a large yard for freight trains.
