= Wuyishan Airport =

Wuyishan Airport 武夷山机场
- IATA: WUS; ICAO: ZSWY

Summary
- Airport type: Public/Military
- Serves: Wuyishan City and Nanping
- Location: Wuyishan Town, Yanshan County, Fujian
- Elevation AMSL: 196 m (643 ft)
- Coordinates: 27°42′03″N 118°00′01″E

Map
- Location in Fujian WUS/ZSWY (China)

Runways
Direction	Length		Surface
Direction	m	ft	Surface
03/21	2,400	7,874	Cement

Statistics (2025)
- Passengers: 319,361
- Aircraft movements: 3,178
- Cargo (metric tons): 36.3

Wuyishan Airport
- Simplified Chinese: 武夷山机场
- Traditional Chinese: 武夷山機場
Transcriptions
Standard Mandarin
- Hanyu Pinyin: Wǔyíshān Jīchǎng

Wuyishan Airport (IATA: WUS, ICAO: ZSWY), formerly Chong'an Airport, is an airport serving Wuyishan City as well as Nanping, Fujian province, China. The airport is home to the 41st Aviation Brigade of People's Liberation Army Air Force, which is transitioning to the Chengdu J-20.

== History ==
Wuyishan Airport, formerly known as Chong'an Airport, was built in 1958 and was a Class II permanent air force airport. In 1984, with the approval of the State Council and the Central Military Commission, it was converted to a joint military-civilian facility. In 1992, the state and local governments jointly invested 96 million yuan to expand the airport.

After the expansion, Wuyishan Airport became a Class 4C civil aviation airport with a designed annual throughput of 420,000 passengers. The airport runway is 2,400 meters long and 45 meters wide, equipped with a Category I instrument landing system, and can accommodate medium-sized aircraft such as the B-737 and MD-82. Wuyishan Airport officially opened to civil aviation on January 15, 1994.

On 22 September 1993, the State Council approved the opening of the Wuyishan Aviation Port. The airport officially opened to the outside world on April 1, 1994. On June 3, 1994, charter flights between Wuyishan and Hong Kong were launched. On March 28, 2000, charter flights between Wuyishan and Macau were launched. On July 1, 2005, the Wuyishan Airport to Hong Kong flight was converted into a regular civil aviation flight.

In March 2013, the construction of new terminal and international passenger inspection hall at Wuyishan Airport started. The new terminal building of Wuyishan Airport, which underwent renovation and construction for more than a year, was officially put into use on December 16, 2015. The hall was put into use on September 29, 2017.

Due to runway maintenance, Wuyishan Airport suspended all flight operations from November 1, 2024. After more than two months of engineering and repair work, the facility reopened on January 28, 2025, following industry inspections and approvals.

== Airlines and destinations ==
Airlines	Destinations
Air China	Chengdu–Tianfu
Shandong Airlines	Guangzhou, Jinan, Qingdao, Seoul-Incheon, Shenzhen, Xiamen, Xi'an, Zhuhai
XiamenAir	Beijing–Daxing, Xiamen

== See also ==
- List of airports in China
- Wuyi New Area
