= Yanping, Nanping =

Yanping 延平区 Yenping
- District
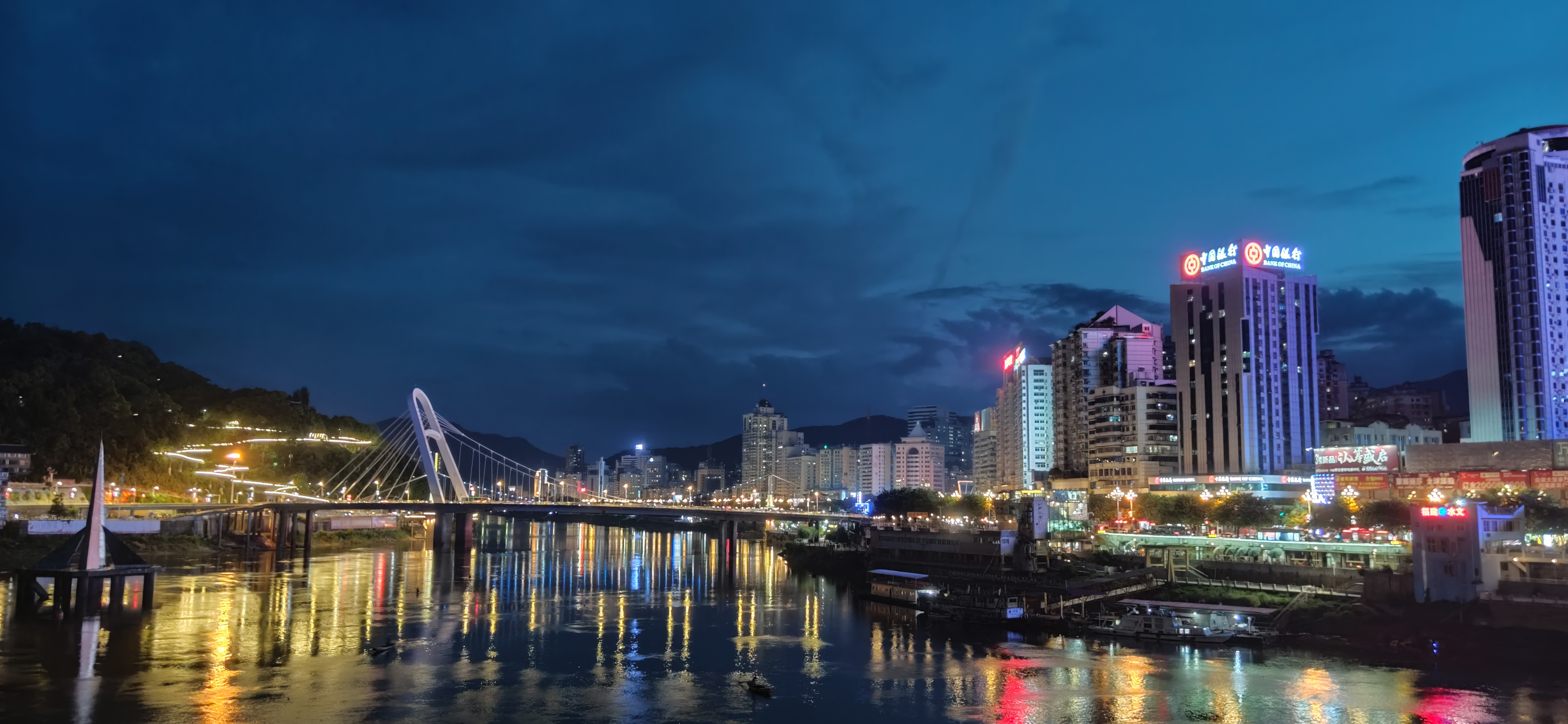
- Skyline of Nanping (at night)
- Nickname: Little Hongkong
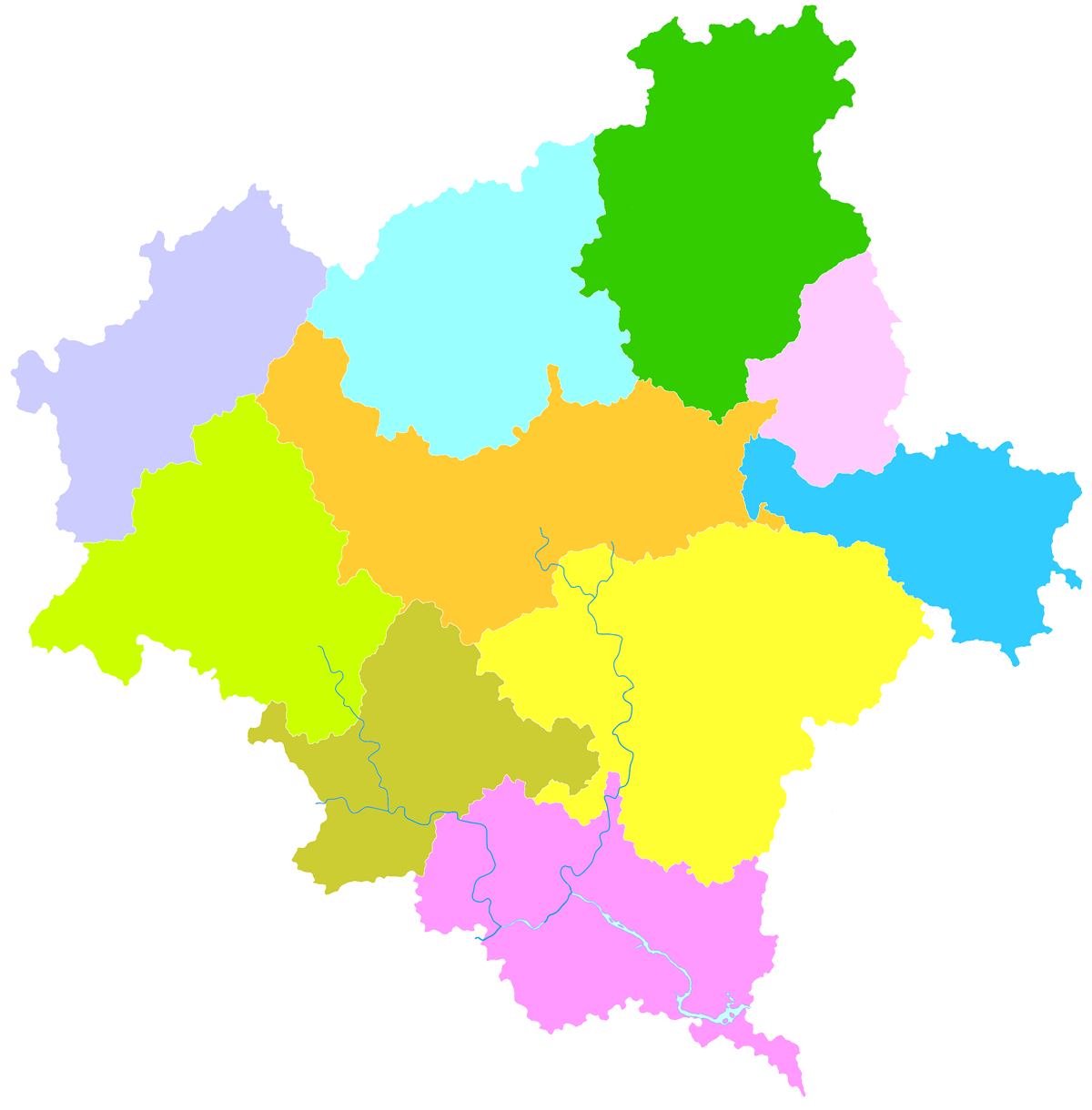
- Yanping in Nanping

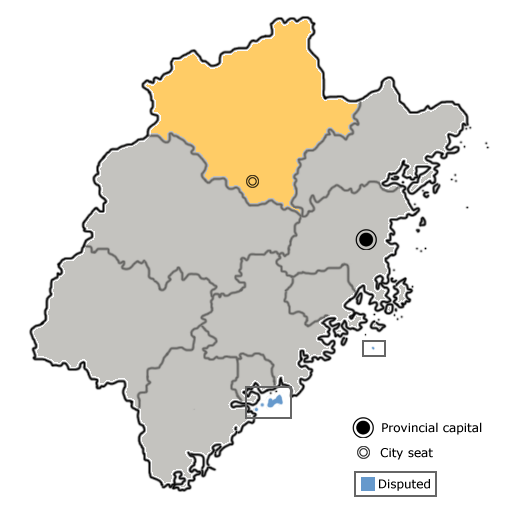
- Nanping in Fujian
- Coordinates (Nanping municipal government): 26°38′31″N 118°10′41″E
- Country: People's Republic of China
- Province: Fujian
- Prefecture-level city: Nanping

Government
  - CPC District Committee Secretary: He Mingxing

Area
  - Total: 2,660 km^{2} (1,030 sq mi)

Population (2020)
  - Total: 454,605
  - Density: 171/km^{2} (443/sq mi)
- Time zone: UTC+8 (China Standard)
- Postal code: 353000
- Area code: 0086-599
- Vehicle registration: 闽H
- Website: www.ypzf.gov.cn

Chinese name
- Simplified Chinese: 延平区
- Traditional Chinese: 延平區
Transcriptions
Standard Mandarin
- Hanyu Pinyin: Yánpíng Qū
Southern Min
- Hokkien POJ: Iân-pêng

Alternative Chinese name
- Chinese: 延城
Transcriptions
Standard Mandarin
- Hanyu Pinyin: Yánchéng

Second alternative Chinese name
- Chinese: 延州
Transcriptions
Standard Mandarin
- Hanyu Pinyin: Yánzhōu

Yanping District is a district of Nanping, Fujian province, People's Republic of China. The population of Yanping District was 454,605 in 2020.

== Etymology ==
The name of the district literally means "Prolong Peace", and it is still commonly referred to as Nanping, which was its name before 1995. Nowadays, people still use both "Yanping" and "Nanping" in mailing address, and Nanping is even more common.

== History ==
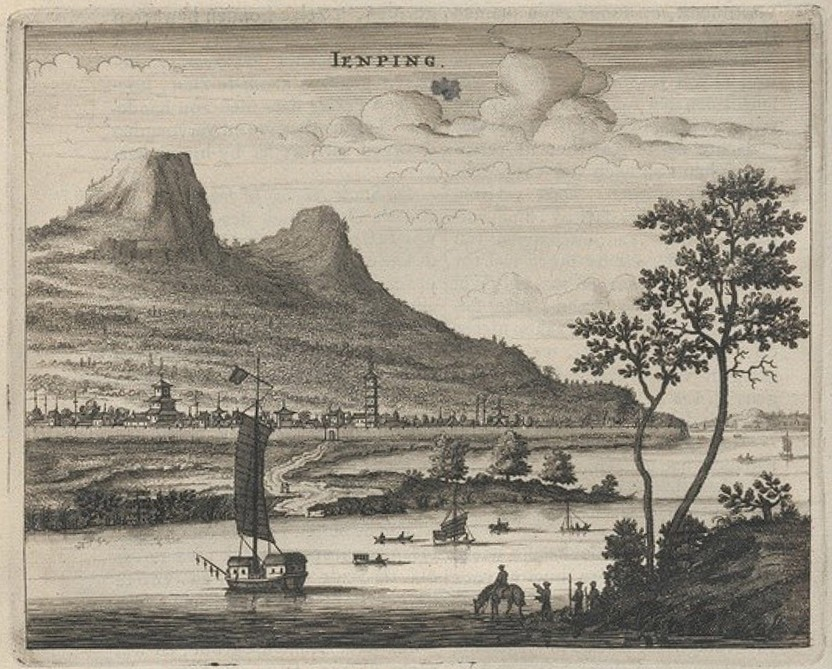
Yanping in the 17th century, from Olfert Dapper: Gedenkwaerdig bedryf

The city was built as a house at 196 BC. Before that it was a village governed by Houguan County (Fuzhou). Because it is the start point of Min River, it acts as a trading transferring center between North Fujian, Jiangxi and Fuzhou.

Also, it is the last stronghold of Fuzhou, the largest city in Fujian, and usually carefully guarded. Because the soldiers came from north China, the city's dialect was more similar to that of Henan Province.

Yanping District was named Nanping City at 1956, and after the prefecture-level city was named Nanping in 1995, it changed to its current name.

== Geography ==
=== Waters ===
- Min River
- Jianxi Brook
- Futun Brook
- Shaxi Brook

=== Mountains ===
- Jiufeng Mountain (literally 9-peak mountain)
- Yuping Mountain

== Climate ==
Climate data for Yanping District, elevation 152 m (499 ft), (1991–2020 normals, extremes 1971–2000)
Month	Jan	Feb	Mar	Apr	May	Jun	Jul	Aug	Sep	Oct	Nov	Dec	Year
Record high °C (°F)	22.3 (72.1)	24.5 (76.1)	30.8 (87.4)	36.0 (96.8)	38.3 (100.9)	39.6 (103.3)	42.1 (107.8)	41.4 (106.5)	39.2 (102.6)	37.6 (99.7)	34.3 (93.7)	26.9 (80.4)	42.1 (107.8)
Mean daily maximum °C (°F)	14.8 (58.6)	17.0 (62.6)	20.1 (68.2)	25.2 (77.4)	28.8 (83.8)	31.5 (88.7)	34.8 (94.6)	34.4 (93.9)	31.5 (88.7)	27.1 (80.8)	22.0 (71.6)	16.6 (61.9)	25.3 (77.6)
Daily mean °C (°F)	10.2 (50.4)	12.1 (53.8)	15.0 (59.0)	19.9 (67.8)	23.7 (74.7)	26.5 (79.7)	29.1 (84.4)	28.7 (83.7)	26.4 (79.5)	21.8 (71.2)	16.8 (62.2)	11.6 (52.9)	20.2 (68.3)
Mean daily minimum °C (°F)	7.2 (45.0)	8.9 (48.0)	11.8 (53.2)	16.2 (61.2)	20.2 (68.4)	23.2 (73.8)	25.0 (77.0)	24.9 (76.8)	22.8 (73.0)	18.1 (64.6)	13.5 (56.3)	8.4 (47.1)	16.7 (62.0)
Record low °C (°F)	−5.7 (21.7)	−6.3 (20.7)	−2.1 (28.2)	3.8 (38.8)	9.6 (49.3)	14.8 (58.6)	20.3 (68.5)	20.0 (68.0)	17.4 (63.3)	10.5 (50.9)	2.4 (36.3)	−4.2 (24.4)	−6.3 (20.7)
Average precipitation mm (inches)	65.5 (2.58)	97.8 (3.85)	195.6 (7.70)	195.4 (7.69)	256.4 (10.09)	322.1 (12.68)	141.7 (5.58)	158.8 (6.25)	88.2 (3.47)	62.7 (2.47)	65.6 (2.58)	50.0 (1.97)	1,699.8 (66.91)
Average precipitation days (≥ 0.1 mm)	10.9	13.2	17.5	16.6	18.0	17.6	12.5	14.0	9.9	7.0	7.8	8.7	153.7
Average snowy days	0.4	0.4	0.1	0	0	0	0	0	0	0	0	0.2	1.1
Average relative humidity (%)	77	77	77	76	77	80	73	74	73	72	76	76	76
Mean monthly sunshine hours	97.3	94.8	98.9	122.1	141.0	146.9	242.1	217.2	183.8	171.2	129.0	117.5	1,761.8
Percentage possible sunshine	29	30	27	32	34	36	58	54	50	48	40	36	40
Source: China Meteorological Administration

== Culture ==
- Snake Festival: it is held in Zhanghu Town on every seventh day of the seventh month on the Chinese calendar.
- Intangible Cultural Heritage: Zhansheng Drum (Chinese: 战胜鼓; lit. 'Victorious Drum'), Nanjian Opera (南剑戏/乱弹): originated from Xiayang Town, Lingbingyang She song (岭炳洋畲歌)

== Industry ==
- Fujian Nanping Nanfu Battery Co., Ltd.
- Fujian Nanping Aluminium Co., Ltd.
- Fujian Nanping Paper Co., Ltd.

== Administration ==
=== Subdistricts ===
- Meishan Subdistrict (梅山街道)
- Huangdun Subdistrict (黄墩街道)
- Ziyun Subdistrict (紫云街道)
- Sihe Subdistrict (四鹤街道)
- Shuinan Subdistrict (水南街道)
- Shuidong Subdistrict (水东街道)

=== Towns ===
- Laizhou (来舟镇)
- Zhanghu (樟湖镇)
- Xiadao (夏道镇)
- Nanshan (南山镇)
- Xiqin (西芹镇)
- Xiayang (峡阳镇)
- Daheng (大横镇)
- Taiping (太平镇)
- Wangtai (王台镇)
- Taqian (塔前镇)
- Yanghou (洋后镇)
- Mangdang (茫荡镇)
- Luxia (炉下镇)

=== Townships ===
- Jukou (巨口乡)
- Chimen (赤门乡)

== Social Securities ==
=== Hospitals ===
- Nanping No.1 Hospital affiliated to Fujian Medical University
- People's Hospital of Nanping affiliated to Fujian University of Traditional Chinese Medicine
- The 92nd Hospital of PLA

=== Education ===
==== Kindergartens ====
- Nanping Experimental Kindergarten

==== Primary schools ====
- Nanping Experimental Primary School

==== Junior high school ====
- Nanping Jianjing junior high school

==== High schools ====
- Nanping No.1 Middle School of Fujian

==== Higher education ====
- Fujian Agriculture and Forestry University

== Transportation ==
=== Railway Station ===
- Yanping East railway station
- Yanping West railway station
- Laizhou railway station (formerly Nanping North railway station, freight only, formerly handled passengers)

=== Coach Station ===
- Nanping Coach Station

=== Bridges ===
- Jianxi Bridge
- Shuidong Bridge
- Yuping Bridge
- Jianzhou Bridge
- Shuinan Bridge
- Nanping Bridge

== Entertainment ==
=== Tourist Attractions ===
- Jiufengshan Park (Mt. Jiufeng Park)
- Yuping Park
- Yangzhen Park
- Xiyuan Canyon
- Xingbang Ecological Grape Orchard (兴邦生态葡萄园): located in Shanwei Village, Wangtai Town
- Mandarin-duck-shaped Rocks (鸳鸯石): located in Gaoping Village, Xiqin Town
- Xiayang Ecological Park (下洋生态园): located in Xiayang (Unincorporated) Village, Shangyang Village

=== Hotels ===
- Minbei Hotel (3-star)

=== Shopping ===
- Yonghui Superstore
- Seashine Department Store
- Yuda Baixing Supermarket

== Notable people ==
- Wu Jingbiao: winner of Men's 56 kg weightlifting in 2010 Asian Games, 2011 Asian Weightlifting Championships, 2010 and 2011 World Weightlifting Championships.

== See also ==
- List of administrative divisions of Fujian
