= Min River (Fujian) =

River in Fujian, China

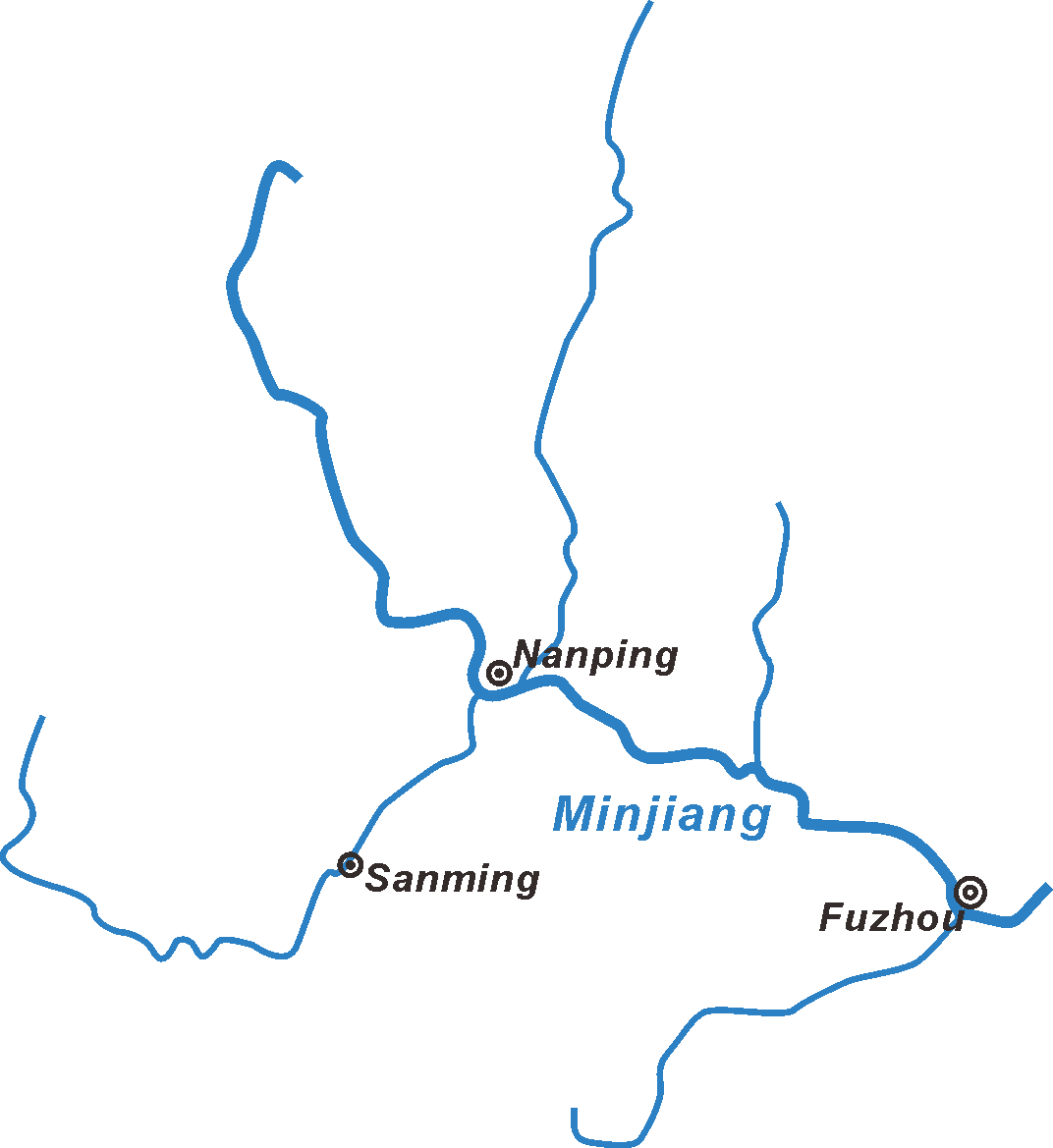

- Native name: 閩江 (Chinese); 闽江 (Chinese); Mǐn Jiāng (Chinese)

Location
- Country: China
- Province: Fujian

Physical characteristics
- Source: Futun
  - location: Shaowu, Fujian
  - coordinates: 27°07′41″N 117°05′24″E
  - elevation: 631 m (2,070 ft)
- 2nd source: Shaxi
  - location: Sanming, Fujian
  - coordinates: 26°18′29″N 116°26′53″E
  - elevation: 557 m (1,827 ft)
- Source confluence
  - location: Nanping, Fujian
  - coordinates: 26°34′41″N 118°01′55″E
  - elevation: 77 m (253 ft)
- Mouth: Taiwan Strait
  - location: Fuzhou, Fujian
  - coordinates: 26°04′34″N 119°31′19″E
  - elevation: 0 m (0 ft)
- Length: 505 km (314 mi)
- Basin size: 60,922 km^{2} (23,522 sq mi)
- Discharge
  - average: 1,980 m^{3}/s (70,000 cu ft/s)

Basin features
- Tributaries
  - left: Renshou, Jianxi and tributaries
  - right: Xixi, Jinxi, Shaxi, Youxi, Dazhang

Min River
- Traditional Chinese: 閩江
- Simplified Chinese: 闽江
Transcriptions
Standard Mandarin
- Hanyu Pinyin: Mǐn jiāng
- IPA: [mìn tɕjáŋ]
Yue: Cantonese
- Jyutping: Man5 gong1
- IPA: [mɐn˩˧ kɔŋ˥]
Southern Min
- Hokkien POJ: Bân kang
Eastern Min
- Fuzhou BUC: Mìng Gĕ̤ng
Northern Min
- Jian'ou Romanized: Ma̿ing-gó̤ng

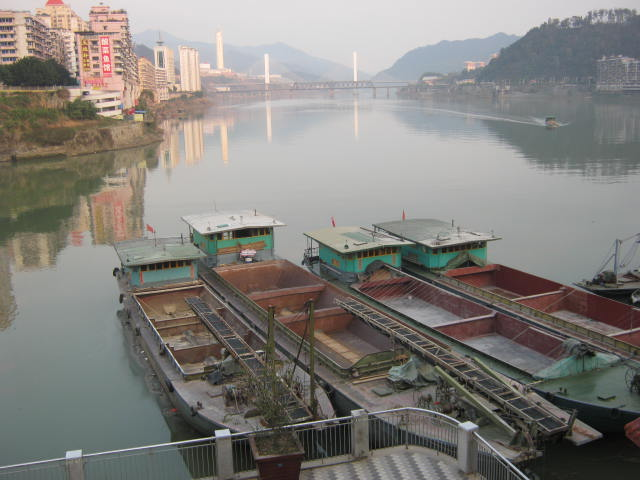
Min River (闽江）in Nanping (南平). Railway bridge (闽江铁路大桥) at the back.

The Min River (Chinese: Mǐn Jiāng) (Note: simplified Chinese: 闽江; traditional Chinese: 閩江; pinyin: Mǐn Jiāng; Foochow Romanized: Mìng-gĕ̤ng; Pe̍h-ōe-jī: Bân-kang; Kienning Colloquial Romanized: Ma̿ing-gó̤ng) is a 505-kilometre-long (314 mi) river in Fujian province, People's Republic of China. It is the largest river in Fujian, and an important water transport channel. Most of northern and central Fujian is within its drainage area.

The provincial capital, Fuzhou (Foochow), sits on the lower Min River, with its historic center being on the northern side of the river. Fuzhou's suburb Changle is on the other side of the river, even closer to its fall into the Taiwan Strait; the location historically made it an important port.

== Alternate sources ==
The traditional source of the Min River is in the far northwest of the basin, hence in China the highest reach is called the Beixi Brook. The total length of the river using this source is 505km. But in fact, the Beixi is neither the geographic or hydrological source of the river. The Shuiqian is the furthest geographic source, and the Shuiqian-Shaxi-Min is 580km long. A different river, the Jinxi, is larger than the Beixi-Futun at the point where the two meet, and consequently is connected to the hydrological source.

== See also ==
- List of rivers in China
- Department of water resource of Fujian
