= Jianyang, Nanping =

Jianyang 建阳区 Kienyang
- District
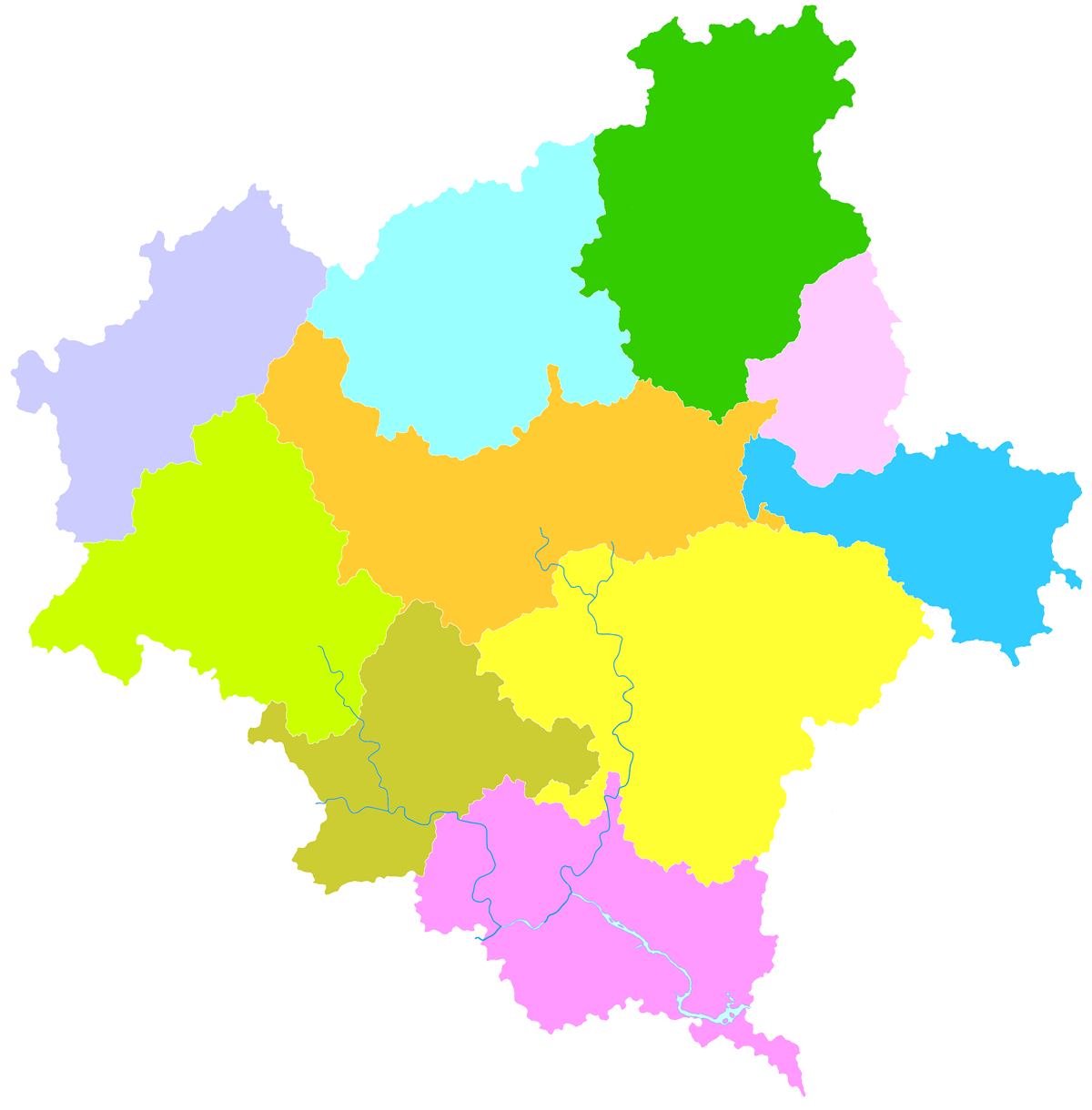
- Jianyang in Nanping

- Location in Fujian
- Coordinates: 27.332°N 118.120°E
- Country: People's Republic of China
- Province: Fujian
- Prefecture-level city: Nanping

Government
  - CPC District Committee Secretary: Yang Xinqiang
- Postal code: 354200
- Area code: 0599
- Vehicle registration: 闽H
- Website: www.jyszfw.gov.cn

Chinese name
- Simplified Chinese: 建阳区
- Traditional Chinese: 建陽區
Transcriptions
Standard Mandarin
- Hanyu Pinyin: Jiànyáng Qū
Southern Min
- Hokkien POJ: Kiàn-iông-khu
Northern Min
- Jian'ou Romanized: Gṳ̿ing-iô̤ng-kṳ́

Alternative Chinese name
- Chinese: 潭城
Transcriptions
Standard Mandarin
- Hanyu Pinyin: Tánchéng
Southern Min
- Hokkien POJ: Thâm-siâⁿ

Jianyang is a district in the prefecture-level city of Nanping, in the northern part of Fujian province, People's Republic of China. Its population was 340,843 in 2020.

Jianyang has rich natural resources: bamboo, tea and water power.

== History ==
From the 11th to the 17th century, commercial publishers established in the area used local bamboo for paper manufacturing and made the area one of the three largest book-producing areas in China in the Song (960–1279) and Yuan (1271–1368) dynasties. The area continued to be an important printing center into the Ming epoch (1368–1644).

Starting in the Southern Song (1127–1279), the county was served by the Chong'an trade route, which connected Quanzhou on the Fujian coast (the nation's major port for trade with Southeast Asia in those days) with northeastern Jiangxi province. This route allowed shipping of local products, notably books, to the major markets of the lower Yangtze region using mostly water transport, with just a few portages.

Jian ware was produced here during the Song dynasty. Master Xiong Zhonggui's Jiyufang Laolong kiln (吉玉坊老龍窯), located in a village near the town of Shuiji, has been able to restart production of Jian Zhan using original clay.

== Administration ==
=== 2 Subdistricts ===
- Tancheng (潭城街道)
- Tongyou (童游街道)

=== 8 Towns ===
- Jiangkou (将口镇)
- Xushi (徐市镇)
- Jukou (莒口镇)
- Masha (麻沙镇)
- Huangkeng (黄坑镇)
- Shuiji (水吉镇)
- Zhangdun (漳墩镇)
- Xiaohu (小湖镇)

=== 3 Townships ===
- Chongluo (崇雒乡)
- Shuifang (水坊乡)
- Huilong (回龙乡)

== Climate ==
Climate data for Jianyang, elevation 197 m (646 ft), (1991–2020 normals, extremes 1981–2010)
| Month | Jan | Feb | Mar | Apr | May | Jun | Jul | Aug | Sep | Oct | Nov | Dec | Year |
|---|---|---|---|---|---|---|---|---|---|---|---|---|---|
| Record high °C (°F) | 27.7 (81.9) | 31.8 (89.2) | 33.1 (91.6) | 34.5 (94.1) | 36.3 (97.3) | 36.9 (98.4) | 41.1 (106.0) | 41.0 (105.8) | 38.2 (100.8) | 37.2 (99.0) | 32.6 (90.7) | 26.3 (79.3) | 41.1 (106.0) |
| Mean daily maximum °C (°F) | 13.2 (55.8) | 15.7 (60.3) | 18.7 (65.7) | 24.3 (75.7) | 28.1 (82.6) | 30.6 (87.1) | 34.1 (93.4) | 33.9 (93.0) | 31.1 (88.0) | 26.6 (79.9) | 20.9 (69.6) | 15.2 (59.4) | 24.4 (75.9) |
| Daily mean °C (°F) | 8.0 (46.4) | 10.3 (50.5) | 13.4 (56.1) | 18.6 (65.5) | 22.6 (72.7) | 25.6 (78.1) | 28.2 (82.8) | 27.8 (82.0) | 25.1 (77.2) | 20.3 (68.5) | 14.8 (58.6) | 9.3 (48.7) | 18.7 (65.6) |
| Mean daily minimum °C (°F) | 4.8 (40.6) | 6.8 (44.2) | 10.0 (50.0) | 14.8 (58.6) | 19.0 (66.2) | 22.2 (72.0) | 24.0 (75.2) | 23.8 (74.8) | 21.2 (70.2) | 16.1 (61.0) | 11.0 (51.8) | 5.8 (42.4) | 15.0 (58.9) |
| Record low °C (°F) | −5.7 (21.7) | −4.4 (24.1) | −3.8 (25.2) | 3.3 (37.9) | 9.2 (48.6) | 13.6 (56.5) | 19.2 (66.6) | 17.8 (64.0) | 12.7 (54.9) | 3.5 (38.3) | −1.3 (29.7) | −8.0 (17.6) | −8.0 (17.6) |
| Average precipitation mm (inches) | 80.8 (3.18) | 105.4 (4.15) | 225.1 (8.86) | 203.5 (8.01) | 257.7 (10.15) | 332.2 (13.08) | 137.9 (5.43) | 122.4 (4.82) | 80.6 (3.17) | 54.1 (2.13) | 74.0 (2.91) | 63.2 (2.49) | 1,736.9 (68.38) |
| Average precipitation days (≥ 0.1 mm) | 13.0 | 13.9 | 18.7 | 17.4 | 18.0 | 18.6 | 12.5 | 13.0 | 9.6 | 7.2 | 9.3 | 10 | 161.2 |
| Average snowy days | 0.8 | 0.6 | 0.1 | 0 | 0 | 0 | 0 | 0 | 0 | 0 | 0 | 0.4 | 1.9 |
| Average relative humidity (%) | 84 | 83 | 84 | 82 | 82 | 84 | 78 | 79 | 78 | 78 | 83 | 83 | 82 |
| Mean monthly sunshine hours | 84.1 | 84.1 | 85.7 | 110.5 | 127.1 | 126.6 | 223.2 | 205.5 | 177.2 | 166.0 | 119.9 | 111.7 | 1,621.6 |
| Percentage possible sunshine | 26 | 26 | 23 | 29 | 30 | 31 | 53 | 51 | 48 | 47 | 37 | 35 | 36 |
Source: China Meteorological Administration

== Transportation ==
=== Expressway ===
- G15_{14} Ningde-Shangrao Expressway
- G3 Beijing-Taipei Expressway

=== National Highway ===
- G205

=== County-level Road (县道) ===
- X809
- X817
- X819

=== Railway Station ===
- Nanpingshi railway station (Literally: Nanping City railway station)

== Education ==
- Fujian Nanping First Secondary School of Jianyang District

== Specialty ==
- Shuiji Bianrou (水吉扁肉)

== Famous people ==
Chu Hsi was a philosopher of the Song Dynasty who taught in Kaoting College in Jianyang.

== Image views ==
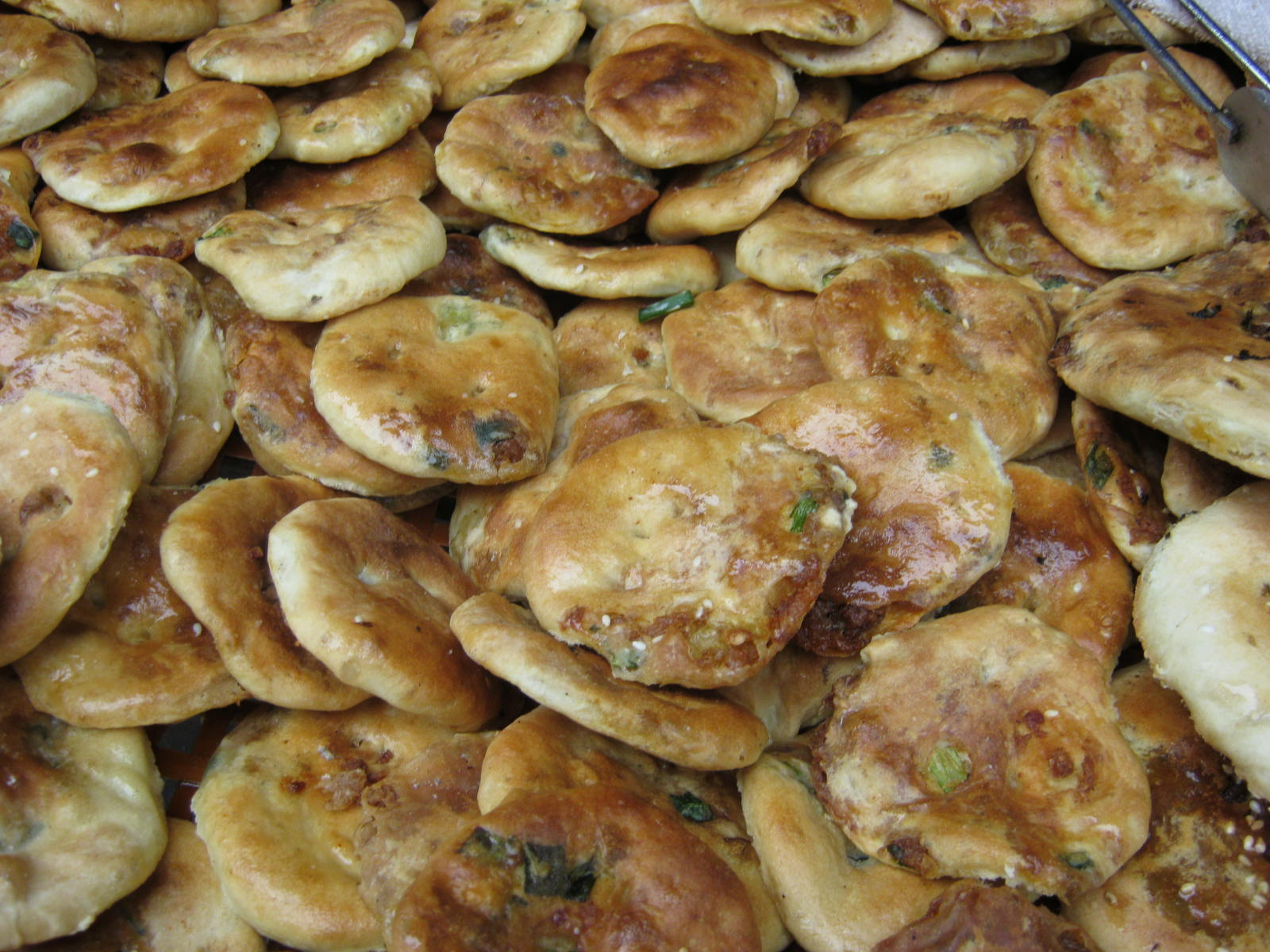
Kompia (房村光饼)

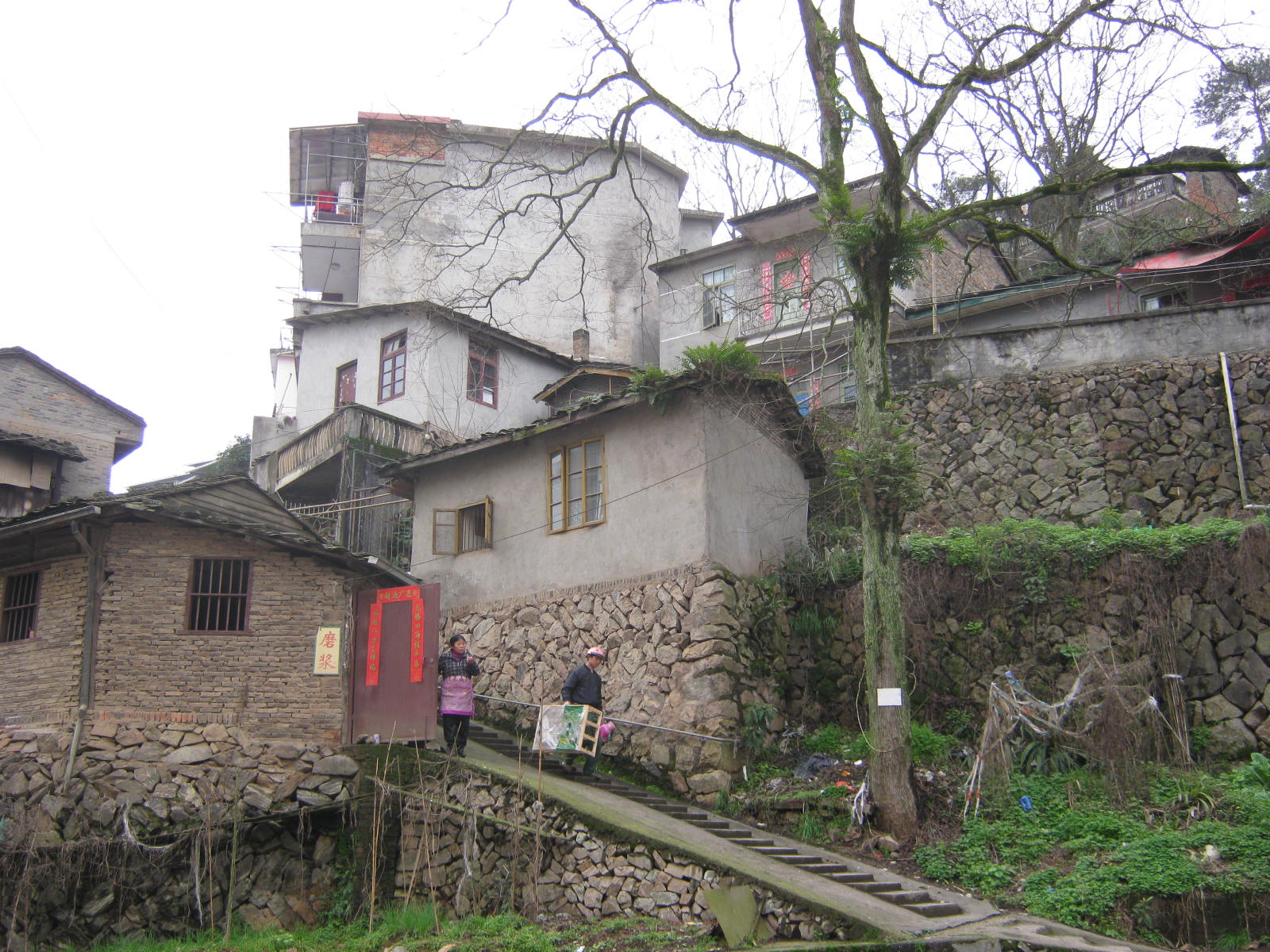
Old Jianyang

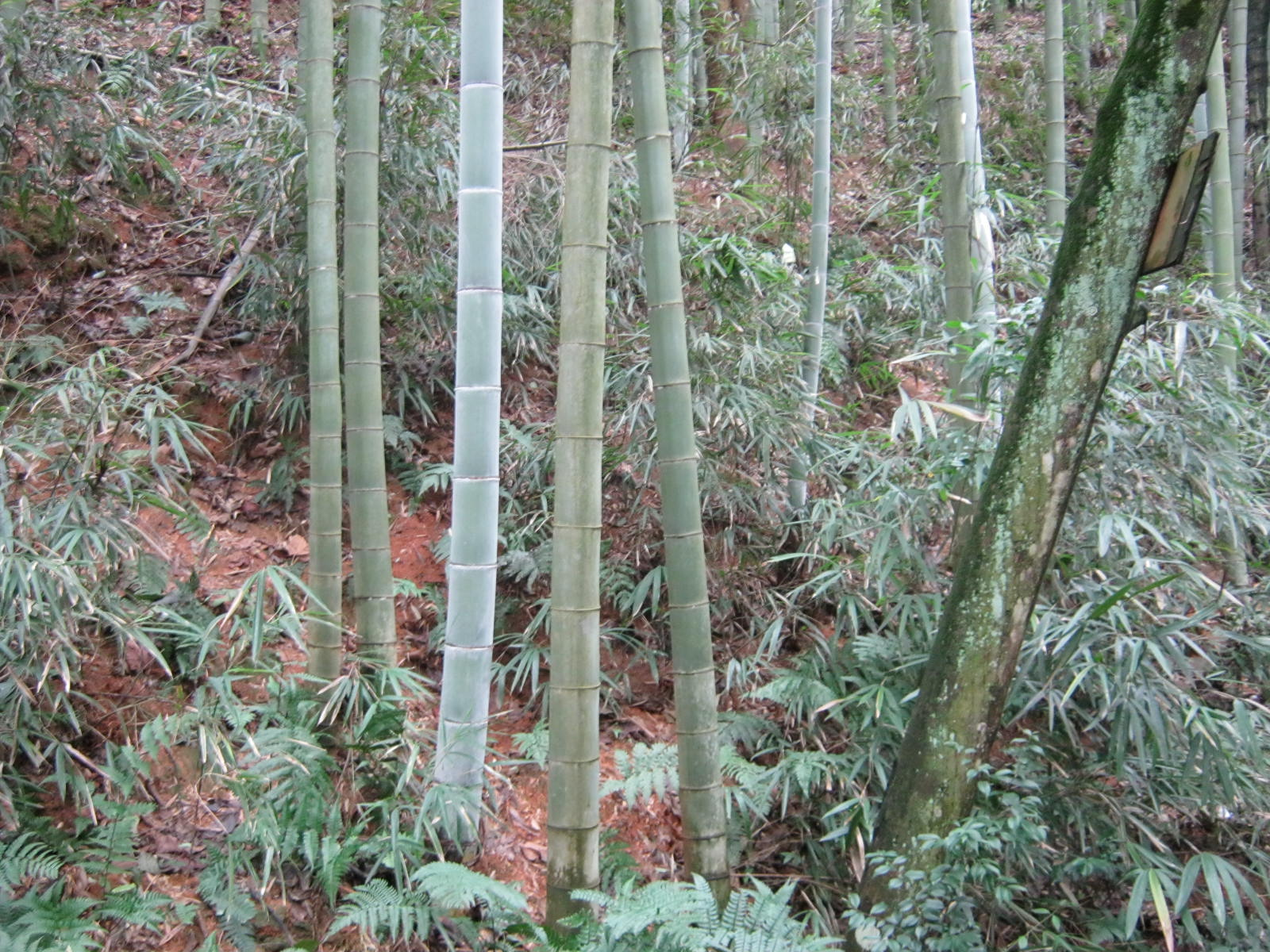
Bamboo in Tan Mountain Park (潭山公园)

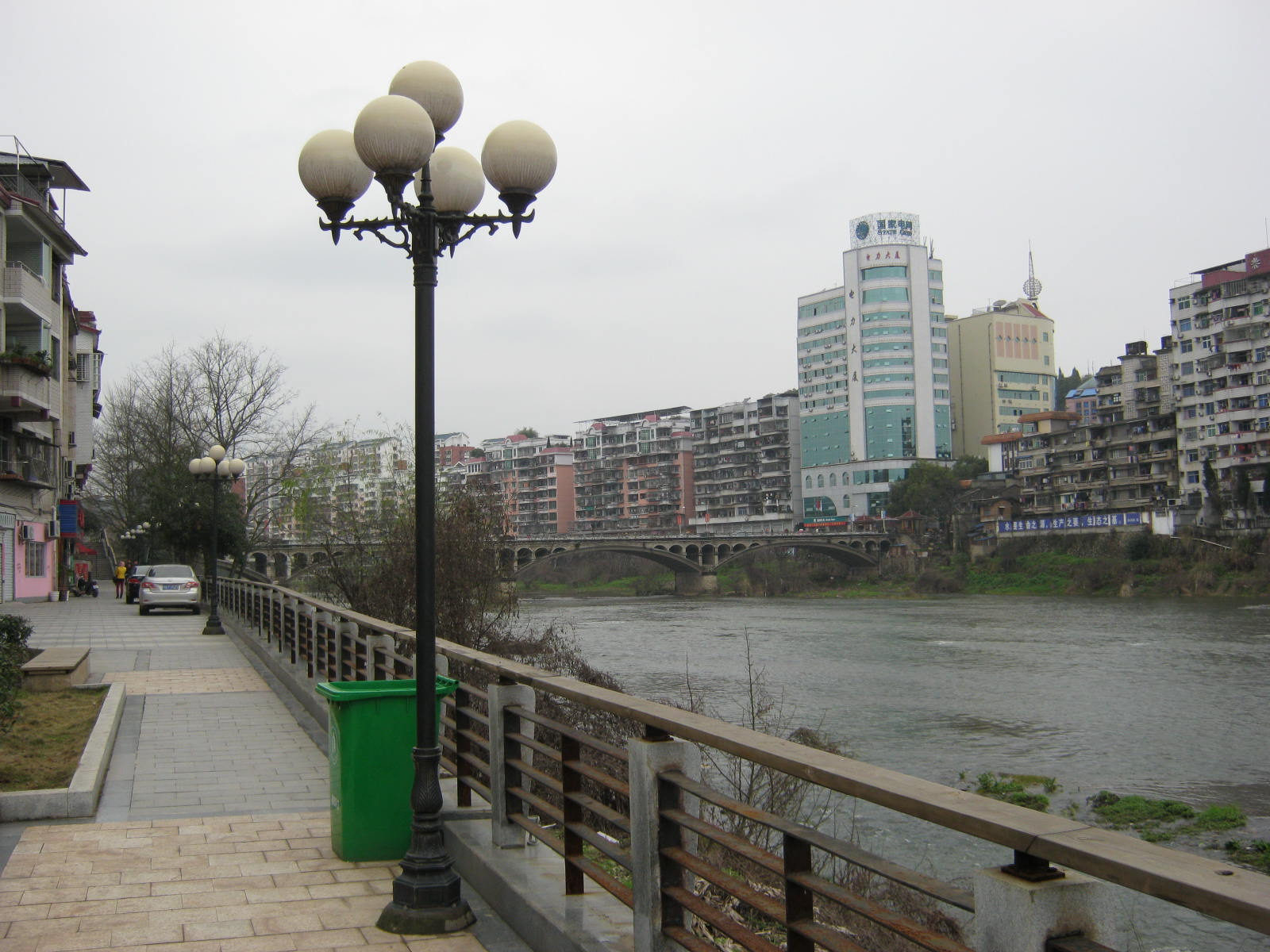
Shuixi Bridge (水西大桥)

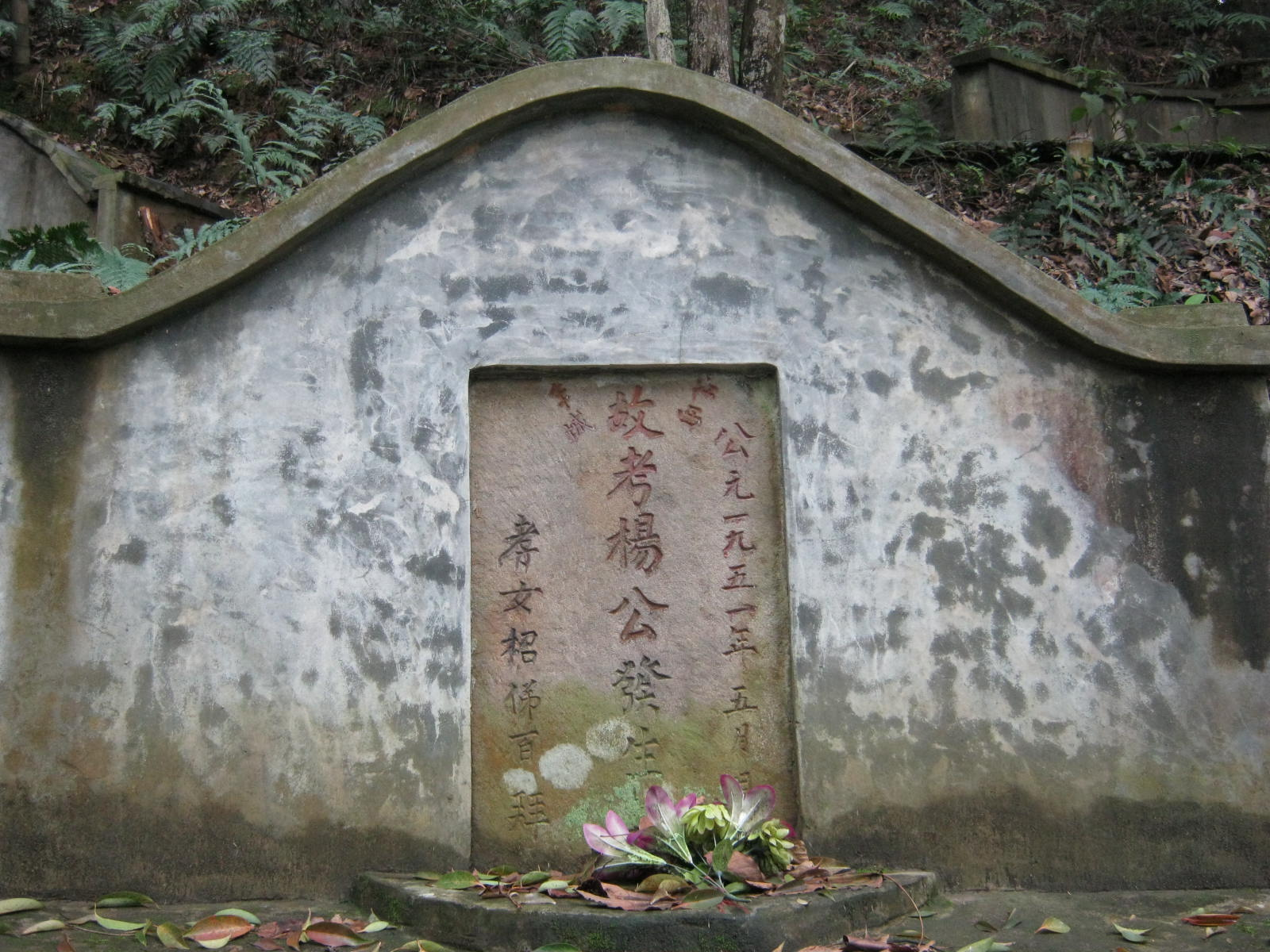
Tan Mountain Park (潭山公园)

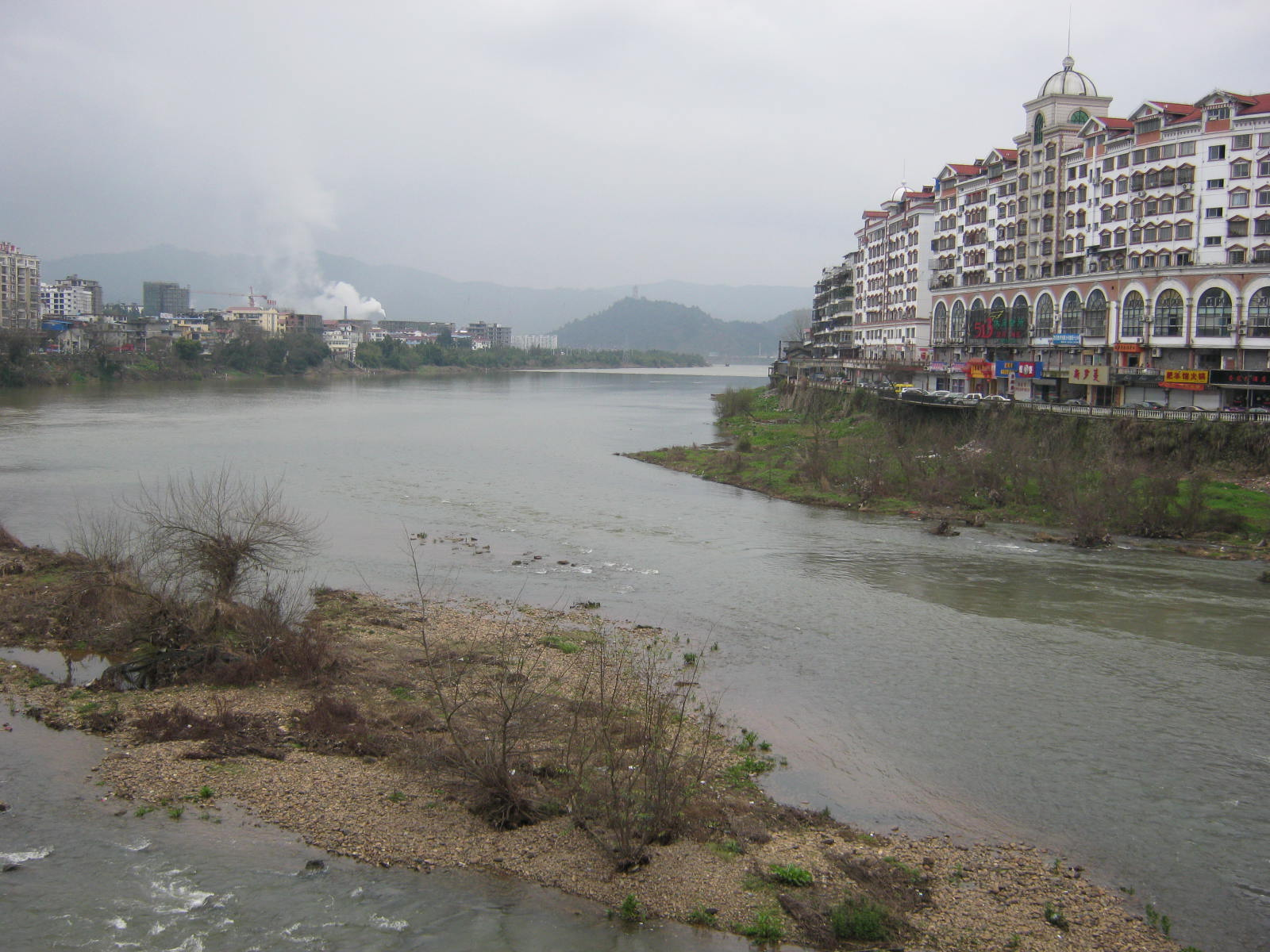
Chongyang Brook (崇阳溪), Jingshan Monastery (景山禅寺) far back.

== See also ==
- List of administrative divisions of Fujian
- Wuyi New Area
