= Wuyi New Area =

- 武夷新区
- Country: China
- Province: Fujian
- Prefecture-level city: Nanping
- Established: June 26, 2012 (Tuesday)

Area
  - Total: 4,132 km^{2} (1,595 sq mi)
- Time zone: China Standard (UTC+8)
- Postal code: 354300
- Postal code: 354200
- Website: http://www.wyxq.gov.cn/index.html

Wuyi New Area is a district in Fujian. It was established on June 26, 2012 in Nanping, Fujian.

== Administration ==
- Wuyishan
- part of Jianyang District: Tancheng Subdistrict, Tongyou Subdistrict, Jiangkou Town, Jukou Town, Huangkeng Town and Chongluo Township.

== See also ==
- List of administrative divisions of Fujian
- List of township-level divisions of Fujian
- Tianfu New Area
- Fuzhou New Area
- Wuyi Mountains
