= Nanping =

Nanping 南平市
- Prefecture-level city
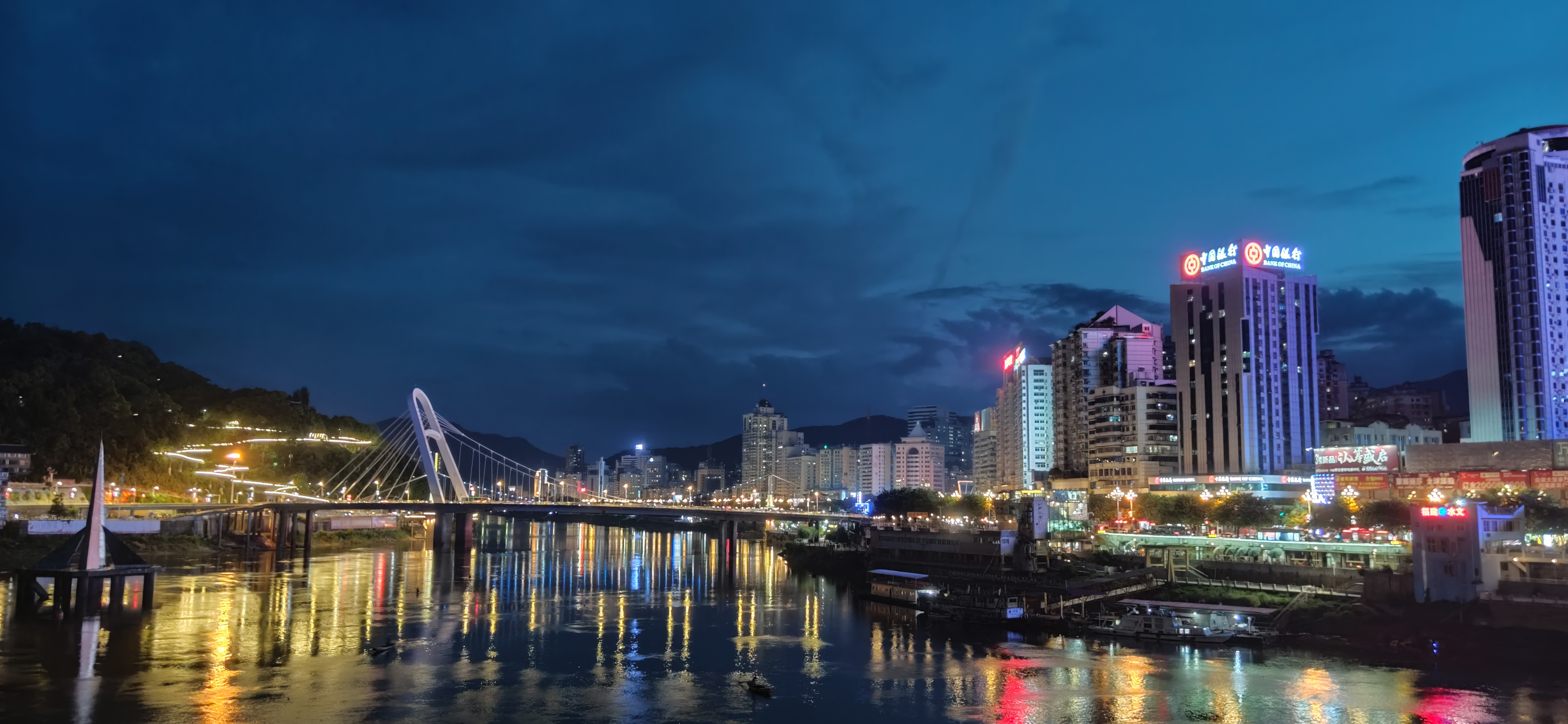
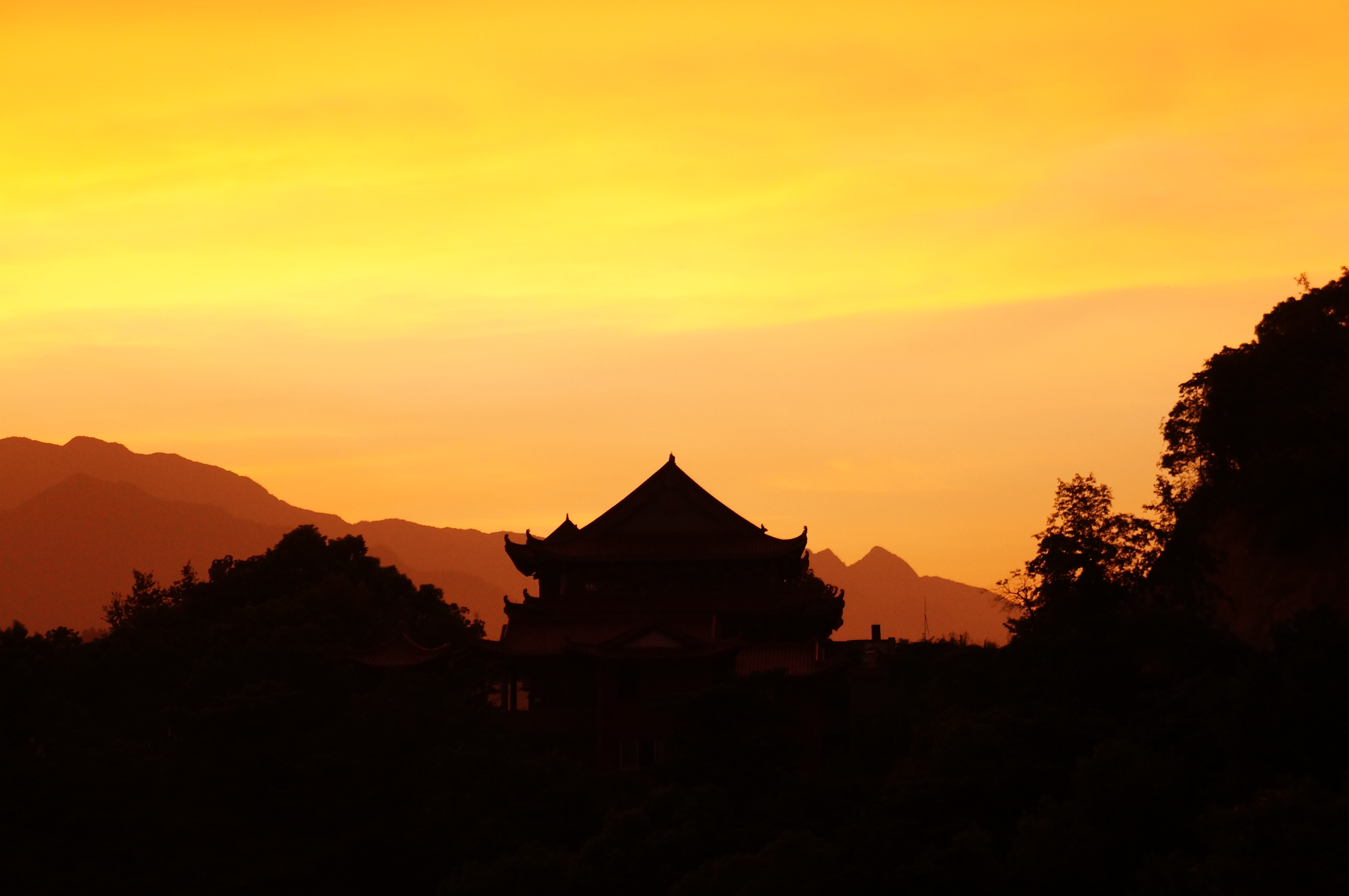
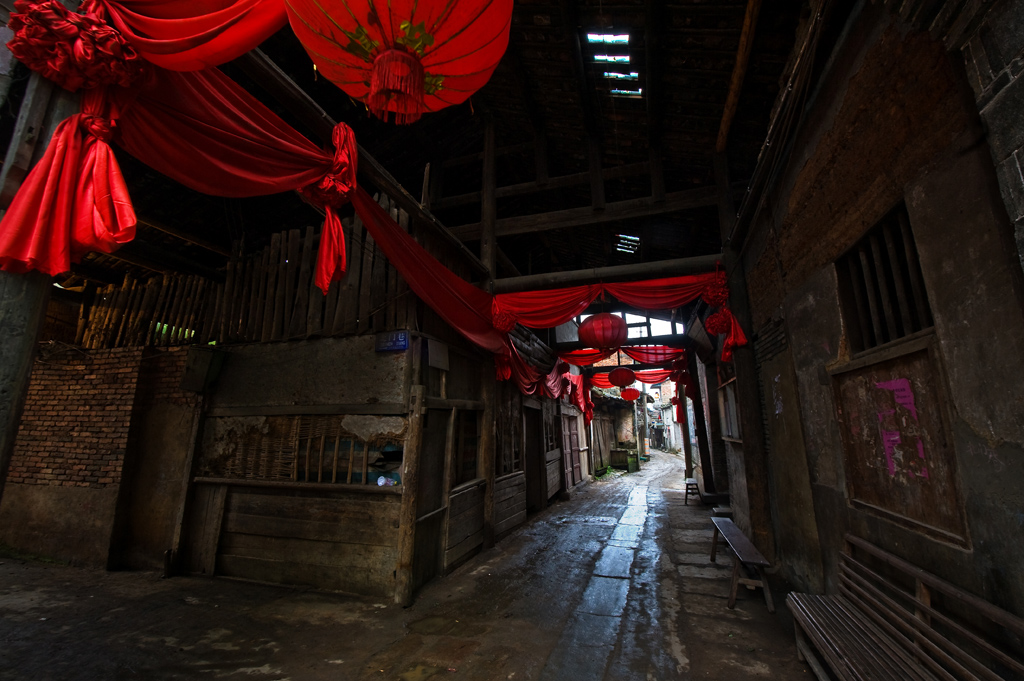
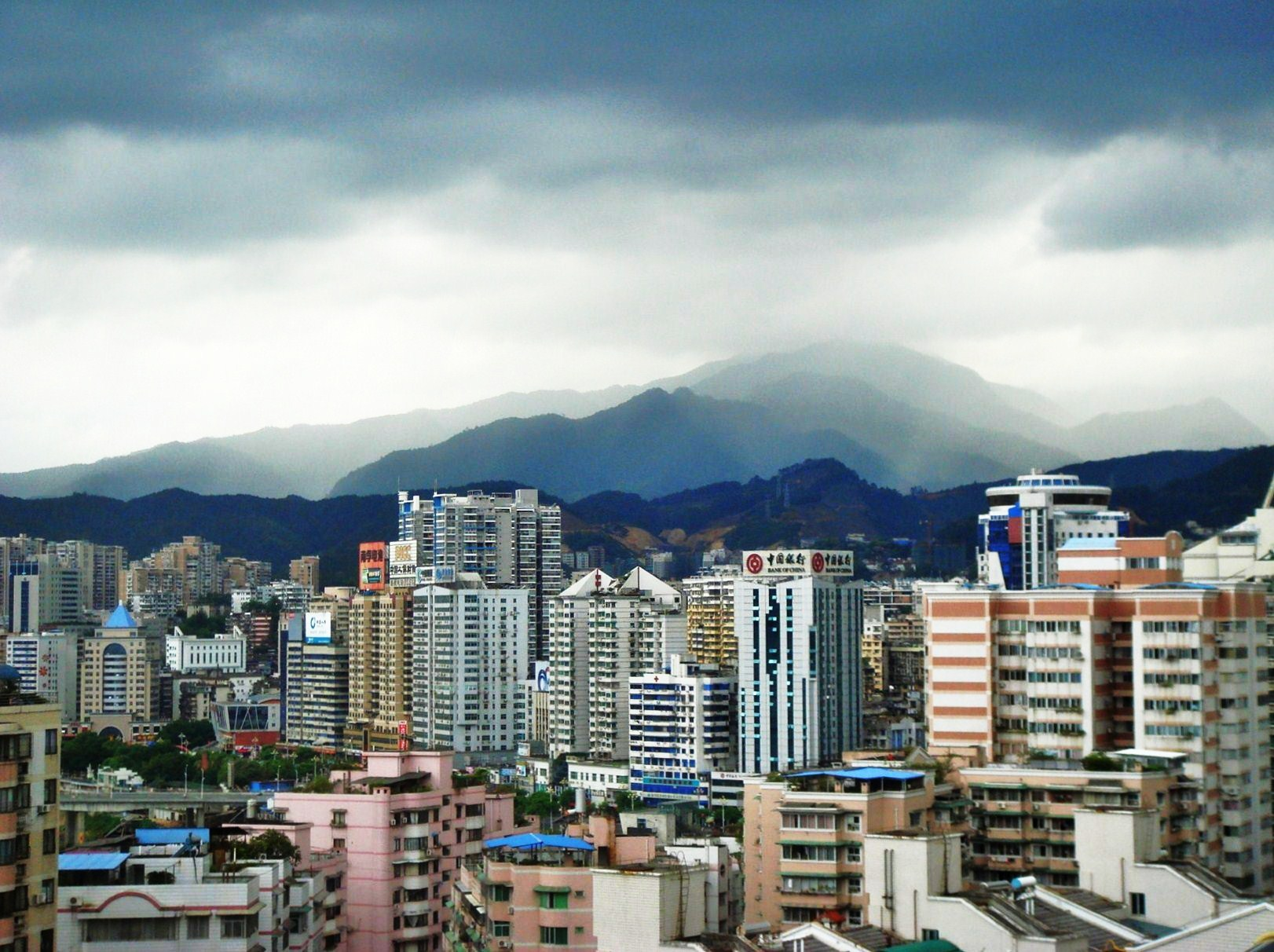
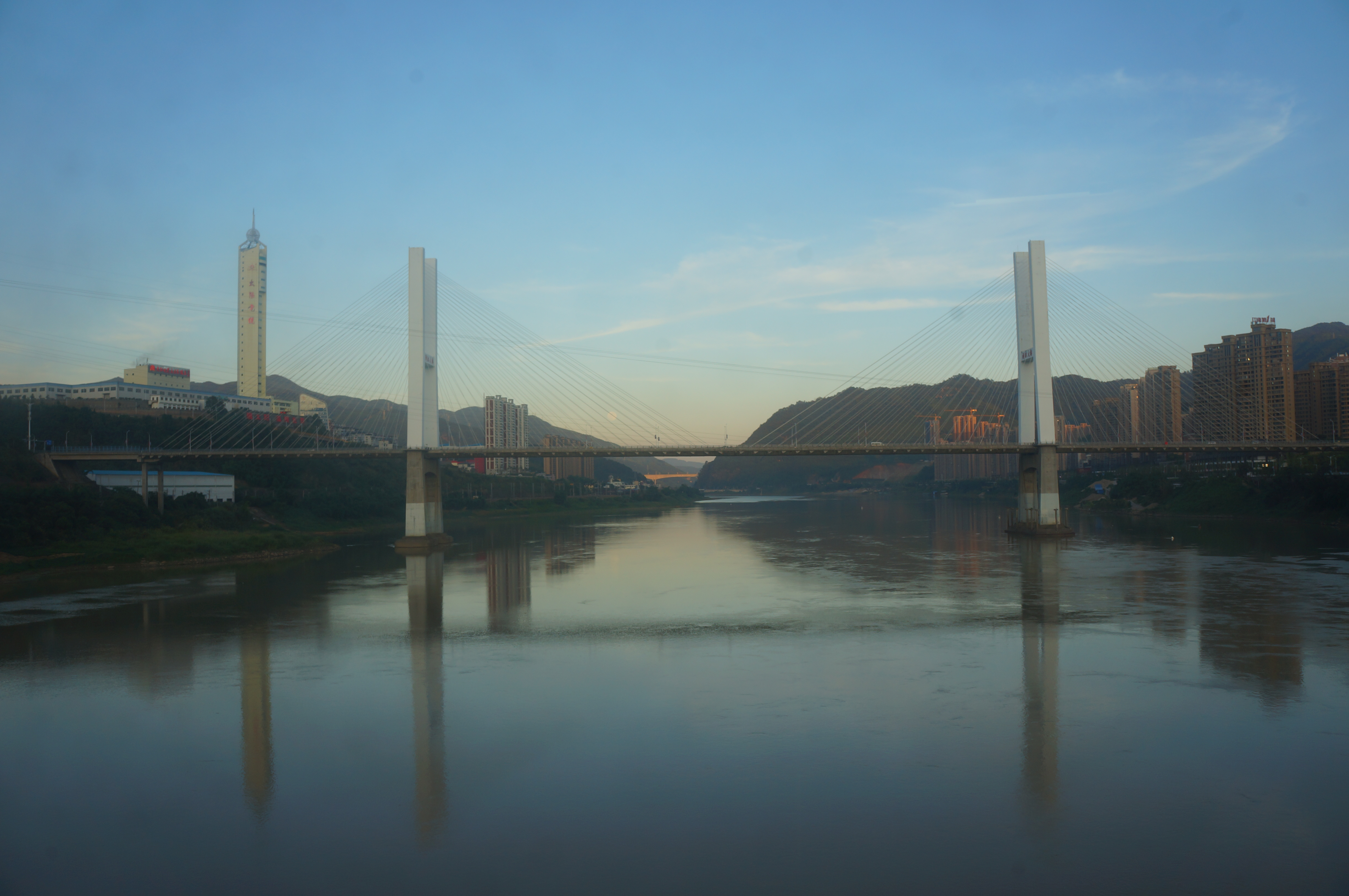
- Clockwise from top: Nanping city at night, Heping old town, Minjiang Bridge, Nanping skyline during the day, and a sunset behind a temple in Yuping Park.
- Nickname: Northern Min
- Location of Nanping City jurisdiction in Fujian
- Coordinates (Nanping Administrative Services Center (南平市行政服务中心)): 26°38′30″N 118°10′39″E
- Country: People's Republic of China
- Province: Fujian
- Municipal seat: Yanping District (currently), Jianyang District (future)

Government
  - CPC Secretary: Yuan Yi
  - Mayor: Xu Weize

Area
  - Prefecture-level city: 26,278 km^{2} (10,146 sq mi)
  - Urban: 2,660 km^{2} (1,030 sq mi)
  - Metro: 2,660 km^{2} (1,030 sq mi)
- Elevation: 89 m (292 ft)

Population (2020 census)
  - Prefecture-level city: 2,680,645
  - Density: 102.01/km^{2} (264.21/sq mi)
  - Urban: 795,448
  - Urban density: 299/km^{2} (775/sq mi)
  - Metro: 795,448
  - Metro density: 299/km^{2} (775/sq mi)

GDP
  - Prefecture-level city: CN¥ 201 billion US$ 29.1 billion
  - Per capita: CN¥ 74,903; US$ 11,763
- Time zone: UTC+8 (CST)
- Postal code: 353000, 354000
- Area code: 0599
- ISO 3166 code: CN-FJ-07
- License Plate Prefixes: 闽H
- Local Dialect: Northern Min
- Website: np.gov.cn

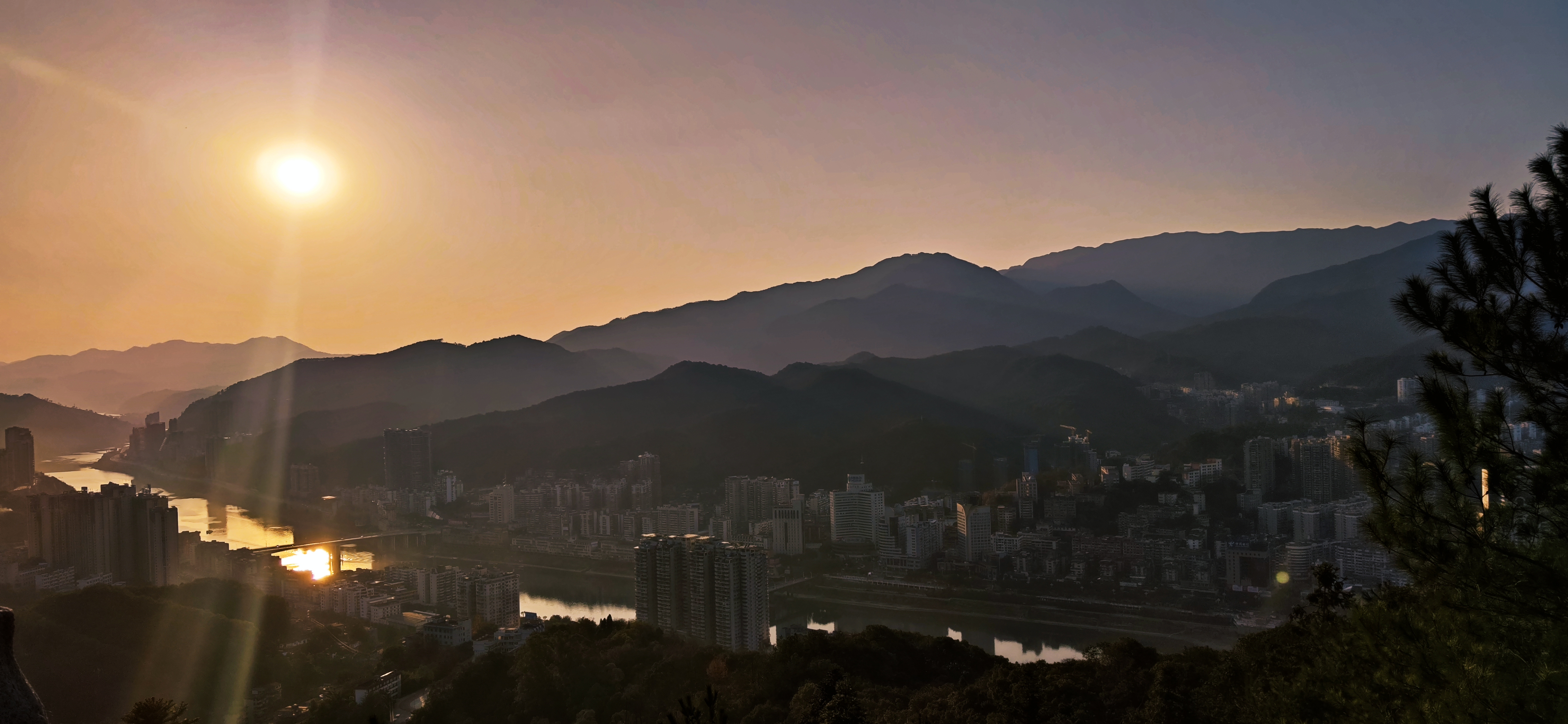
Nanping

Nanping (Note: Chinese: 南平; pinyin: Nánpíng, Northern Min: Na̿ng-běng; historically known as Yanping (Chinese: 延平, Northern Min: Îng-běng)) is a third-tier prefecture-level city in northwestern Fujian Province, People's Republic of China. It borders Ningde to the east, Sanming to the south, and the provinces of Zhejiang and Jiangxi to the north and west respectively. Part of the famous Wuyi Mountains range is located in this prefecture. Its population was 2,680,645 as of the 2020 census, of whom 795,448 lived in the built-up (or metro) area made up of Yanping and Jianyang urban districts.At the end of 2024 and the beginning of 2025, the permanent population will be 2.623 million.

Nanping is a picturesque old city, located on a hill near the fall of the Jianxi Brook into the Min, and surrounded by high stone walls, which were used to prevent artillery fire. They formed a considerable obstacle to anything hostile in past conflicts. The city flower is lily.

There are towering peaks and widespread low mountains in the territory, with river valleys and small basins scattered among them. Its landscape is dominated by hills and mountains and echoes a traditional Chinese saying that describes southern China as "eight parts mountain, one part water, and one part farmland" (八山一水一分田).

== Administration ==
The prefecture-level city of Nanping administers 2 districts, 3 county-level cities and 5 counties.

- Yanping District (延平区)
- Jianyang District (建阳区)
- Shaowu City (邵武市)
- Wuyishan City (武夷山市)
- Jian'ou City (建瓯市)
- Shunchang County (顺昌县)
- Pucheng County (浦城县)
- Guangze County (光泽县)
- Songxi County (松溪县)
- Zhenghe County (政和县)

Map
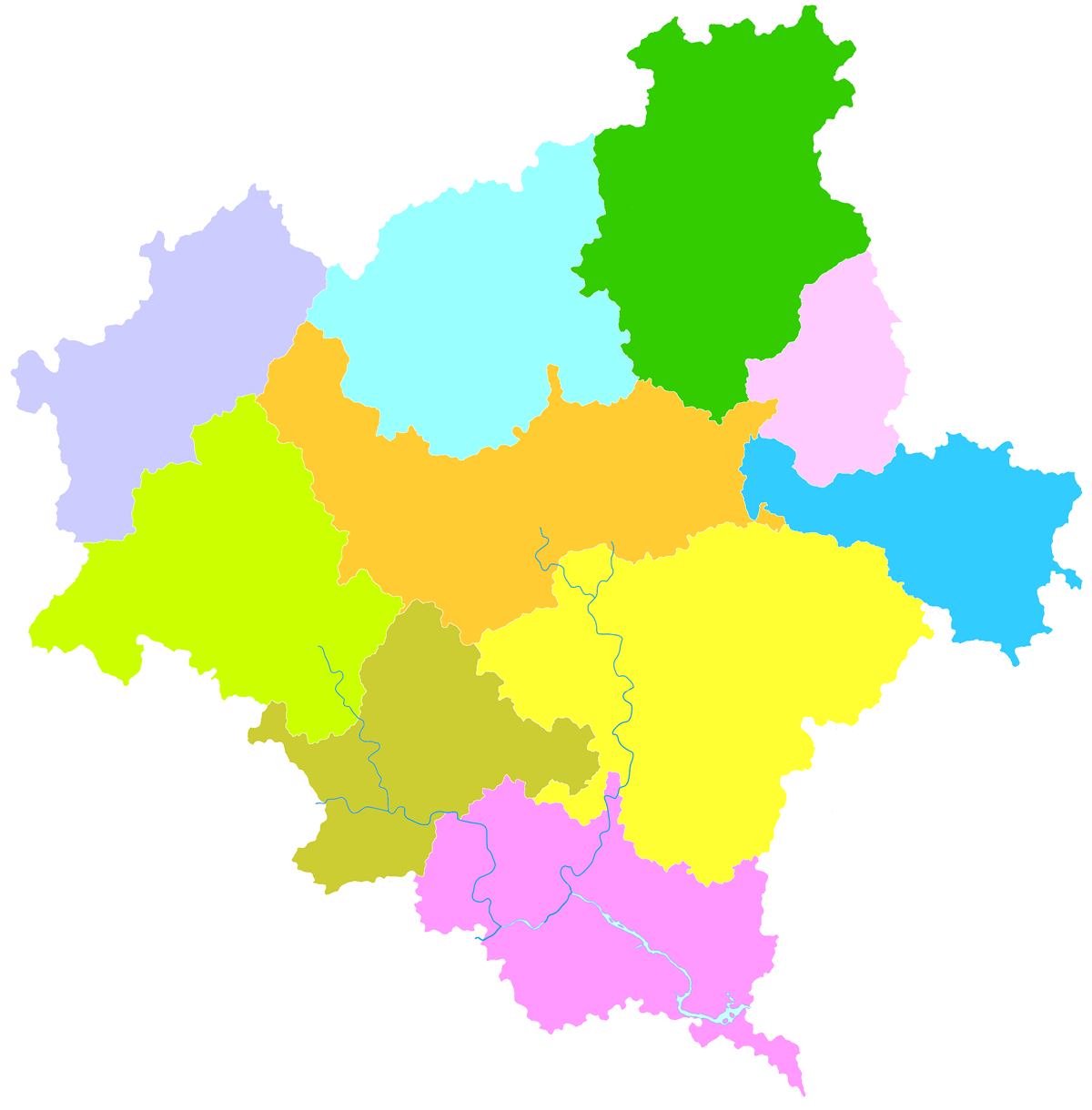

== Geography and climate ==
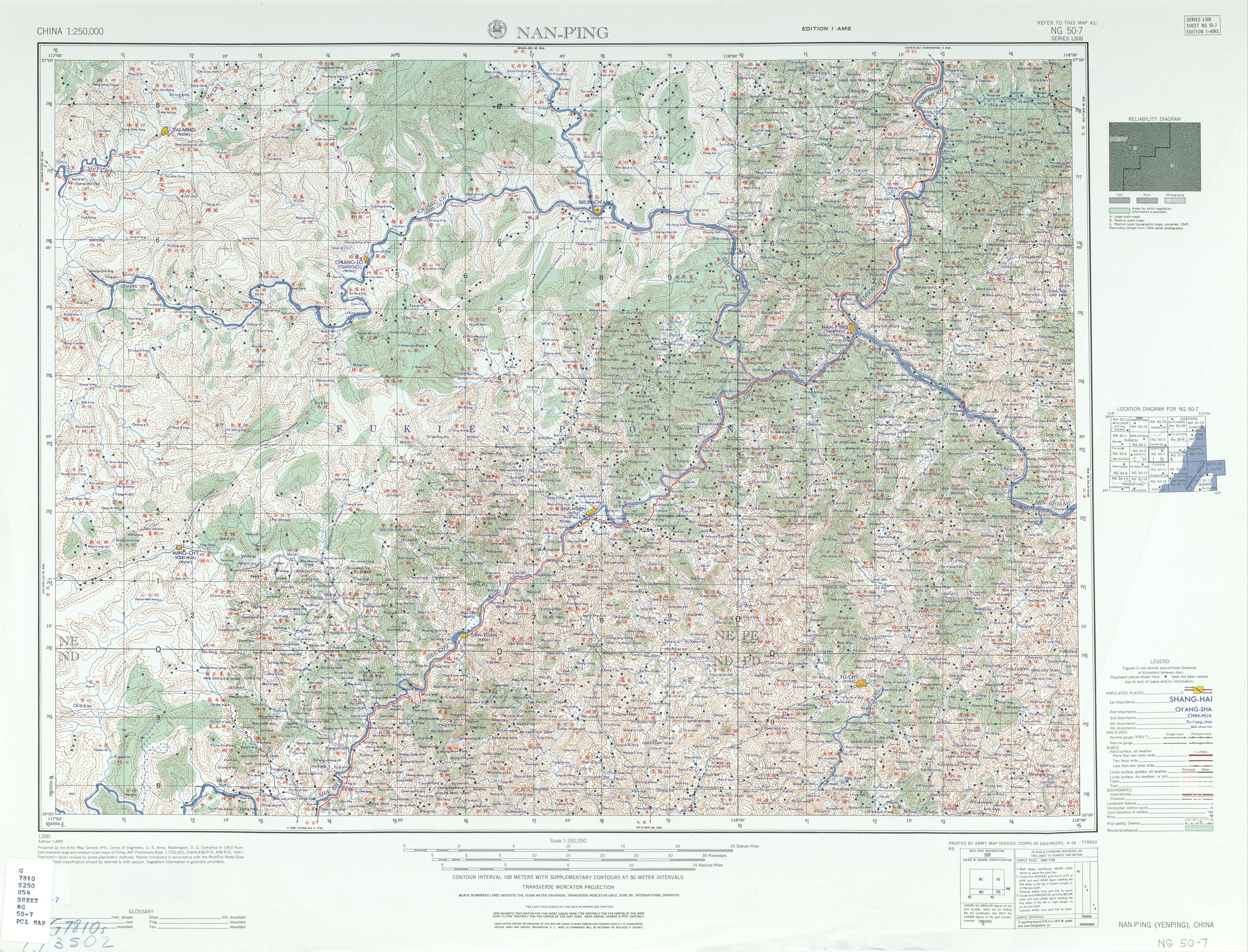
Nanping (labeled as NAN-P'ING (YENPING) 南平) (1953)

The geographical coordinates of Nanping City are 117°00’-119°25’E, 26°30’-28°20’N. Nanping, similar to the rest of the province, has a humid subtropical climate (Köppen Cfa), with short and mild winters, and long, very hot and humid summers. The monthly 24-hour average temperature ranges from 9.7 °C (49.5 °F) in January to 28.7 °C (83.7 °F) in July, and the annual mean is 19.50 °C (67.1 °F). During the year, temperatures typically vary between 3°C and 37°C, rarely falling below -2°C or above 41°C. Rainfall averages more than 200 mm (7.9 in) per month from March to June before gradually tapering off until early winter. With monthly percent possible sunshine ranging from 24% in March to 57% in July, the city receives 1,721 hours of bright sunshine annually, with summer being the sunniest time of the year; spring and late winter are especially overcast and damp.

Climate data for Nanping (Jianyang District), elevation 197 m (646 ft), (1991–2020 normals, extremes 1981–2010)
Month	Jan	Feb	Mar	Apr	May	Jun	Jul	Aug	Sep	Oct	Nov	Dec	Year
Record high °C (°F)	27.7 (81.9)	31.8 (89.2)	33.1 (91.6)	34.5 (94.1)	36.3 (97.3)	36.9 (98.4)	41.1 (106.0)	41.0 (105.8)	38.2 (100.8)	37.2 (99.0)	32.6 (90.7)	26.3 (79.3)	41.1 (106.0)
Mean daily maximum °C (°F)	13.2 (55.8)	15.7 (60.3)	18.7 (65.7)	24.3 (75.7)	28.1 (82.6)	30.6 (87.1)	34.1 (93.4)	33.9 (93.0)	31.1 (88.0)	26.6 (79.9)	20.9 (69.6)	15.2 (59.4)	24.4 (75.9)
Daily mean °C (°F)	8.0 (46.4)	10.3 (50.5)	13.4 (56.1)	18.6 (65.5)	22.6 (72.7)	25.6 (78.1)	28.2 (82.8)	27.8 (82.0)	25.1 (77.2)	20.3 (68.5)	14.8 (58.6)	9.3 (48.7)	18.7 (65.6)
Mean daily minimum °C (°F)	4.8 (40.6)	6.8 (44.2)	10.0 (50.0)	14.8 (58.6)	19.0 (66.2)	22.2 (72.0)	24.0 (75.2)	23.8 (74.8)	21.2 (70.2)	16.1 (61.0)	11.0 (51.8)	5.8 (42.4)	15.0 (58.9)
Record low °C (°F)	−5.7 (21.7)	−4.4 (24.1)	−3.8 (25.2)	3.3 (37.9)	9.2 (48.6)	13.6 (56.5)	19.2 (66.6)	17.8 (64.0)	12.7 (54.9)	3.5 (38.3)	−1.3 (29.7)	−8.0 (17.6)	−8.0 (17.6)
Average precipitation mm (inches)	80.8 (3.18)	105.4 (4.15)	225.1 (8.86)	203.5 (8.01)	257.7 (10.15)	332.2 (13.08)	137.9 (5.43)	122.4 (4.82)	80.6 (3.17)	54.1 (2.13)	74.0 (2.91)	63.2 (2.49)	1,736.9 (68.38)
Average precipitation days (≥ 0.1 mm)	13.0	13.9	18.7	17.4	18.0	18.6	12.5	13.0	9.6	7.2	9.3	10	161.2
Average snowy days	0.8	0.6	0.1	0	0	0	0	0	0	0	0	0.4	1.9
Average relative humidity (%)	84	83	84	82	82	84	78	79	78	78	83	83	82
Mean monthly sunshine hours	84.1	84.1	85.7	110.5	127.1	126.6	223.2	205.5	177.2	166.0	119.9	111.7	1,621.6
Percentage possible sunshine	26	26	23	29	30	31	53	51	48	47	37	35	36
Source: China Meteorological Administration

Climate data for Nanping (Yanping District), elevation 152 m (499 ft), (1991–2020 normals, extremes 1951–present)
Month	Jan	Feb	Mar	Apr	May	Jun	Jul	Aug	Sep	Oct	Nov	Dec	Year
Record high °C (°F)	29.3 (84.7)	33.4 (92.1)	34.2 (93.6)	36.9 (98.4)	38.2 (100.8)	39.6 (103.3)	42.1 (107.8)	41.4 (106.5)	39.2 (102.6)	39.1 (102.4)	33.5 (92.3)	29.9 (85.8)	42.1 (107.8)
Mean daily maximum °C (°F)	14.8 (58.6)	17.0 (62.6)	20.1 (68.2)	25.2 (77.4)	28.8 (83.8)	31.5 (88.7)	34.8 (94.6)	34.4 (93.9)	31.5 (88.7)	27.1 (80.8)	22.0 (71.6)	16.6 (61.9)	25.3 (77.6)
Daily mean °C (°F)	10.2 (50.4)	12.1 (53.8)	15.0 (59.0)	19.9 (67.8)	23.7 (74.7)	26.5 (79.7)	29.1 (84.4)	28.7 (83.7)	26.4 (79.5)	21.8 (71.2)	16.8 (62.2)	11.6 (52.9)	20.2 (68.3)
Mean daily minimum °C (°F)	7.2 (45.0)	8.9 (48.0)	11.8 (53.2)	16.2 (61.2)	20.2 (68.4)	23.2 (73.8)	25.0 (77.0)	24.9 (76.8)	22.8 (73.0)	18.1 (64.6)	13.5 (56.3)	8.4 (47.1)	16.7 (62.0)
Record low °C (°F)	−5.8 (21.6)	−3.6 (25.5)	−1.2 (29.8)	3.5 (38.3)	9.0 (48.2)	15.1 (59.2)	20.5 (68.9)	18.5 (65.3)	10.5 (50.9)	4.7 (40.5)	−1.0 (30.2)	−5.1 (22.8)	−5.8 (21.6)
Average precipitation mm (inches)	65.5 (2.58)	97.8 (3.85)	195.6 (7.70)	195.4 (7.69)	256.4 (10.09)	322.1 (12.68)	141.7 (5.58)	158.8 (6.25)	88.2 (3.47)	62.7 (2.47)	65.6 (2.58)	50.0 (1.97)	1,699.8 (66.91)
Average precipitation days (≥ 0.1 mm)	10.9	13.2	17.5	16.6	18.0	17.6	12.5	14.0	9.9	7.0	7.8	8.7	153.7
Average snowy days	0.4	0.4	0.1	0	0	0	0	0	0	0	0	0.2	1.1
Average relative humidity (%)	77	77	77	76	77	80	73	74	73	72	76	76	76
Mean monthly sunshine hours	97.3	94.8	98.9	122.1	141.0	146.9	242.1	217.2	183.8	171.2	129.0	117.5	1,761.8
Percentage possible sunshine	29	30	27	32	34	36	58	54	50	48	40	36	40
Source: China Meteorological Administration extremes

== Industry ==
The industry of Nanping comprises various export-oriented industries. This includes the Fujian Nanping Nanfu Battery Company Ltd. It is the biggest alkaline battery manufacturer and supplier in mainland China.

== Transportation ==
There are 16 high-speed rail (train station) stations in Nanping, namely: Wuyishan North Station, Yanping Station, Nanping City Station, Jianou West Station, Yanping West Station, Wuyishan Station, Jianyang Station, Jianou Station, Yanping East Station, Songxi Bus Station, Zhenghe Station, Jianou East Bus Station, Shaowu Station, Guangze Railway Station, Laizhou Station, and Shunchang Station.

== Sister cities ==
Nanping's sister cites are:

- Stamford, Connecticut, United States
- Bridgeport, Connecticut, United States
- Albury, New South Wales, Australia
- Da Nang, Vietnam
- Honolulu, Hawaii, United States (Note: With Wuyishan)
- Blue Mountains, New South Wales, Australia (Note: With Wuyishan)
- Sibu, Sarawak, Malaysia 6 November 2014
- Milwaukie, Oregon, United States 23 August 2015
- Milyang, Gyeongsangnam-do, South Korea 15 January 2016
- Opfikon, Zurich, Switzerland May 2016

== Notable people ==
- Hou Yuzhu
- Huang Kaixiang
- Li Qiumei
- Rev. Nathan Sites
- Wu Jingbiao
- Wu Meijin
- Zhang Guozheng
- Yingying Zhang (student who disappeared in the United States)
- Li Ruxin
- Zhang Hao

== Image views ==
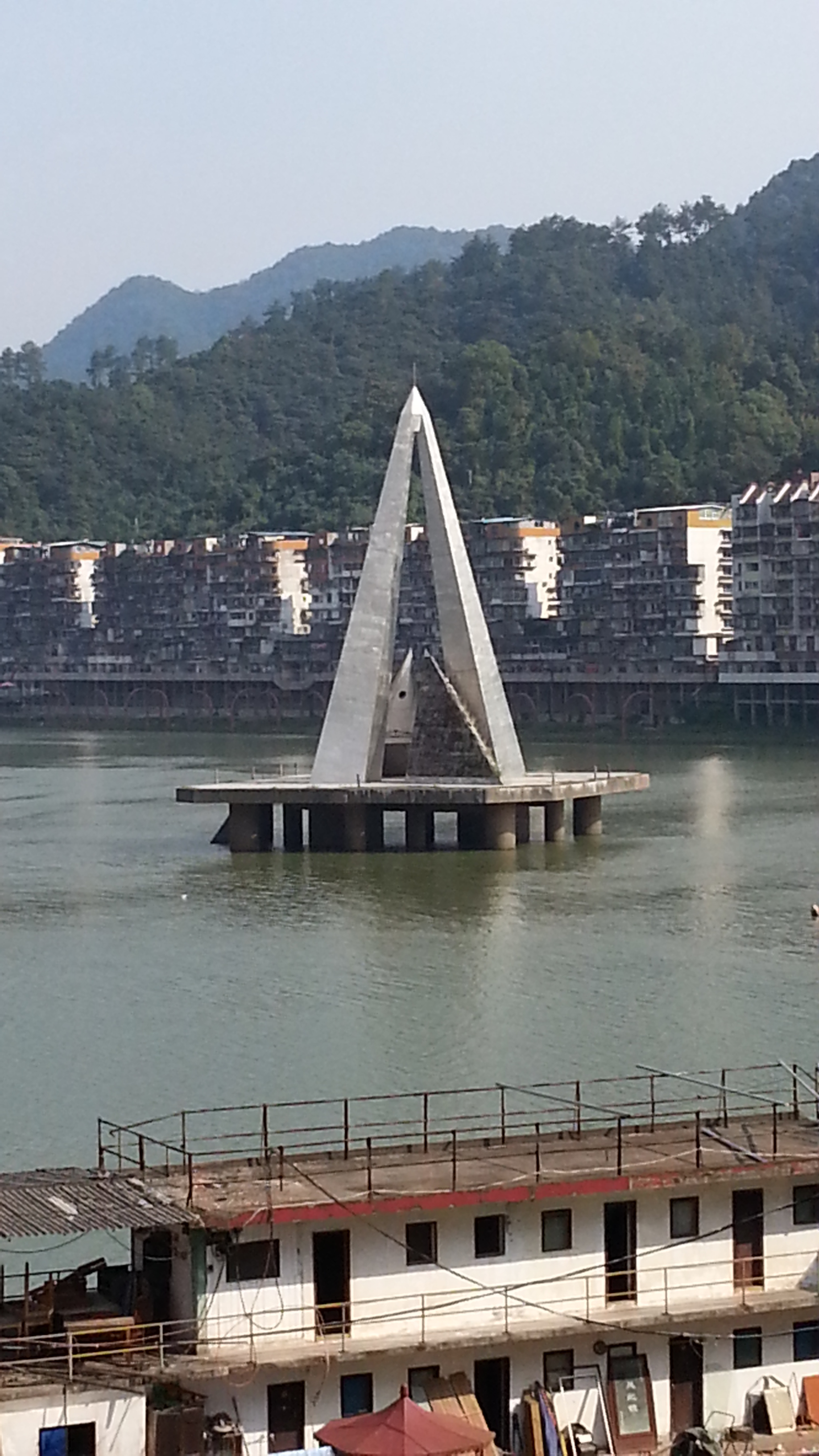
The seal of Nanping: Dragon transformation of two swords

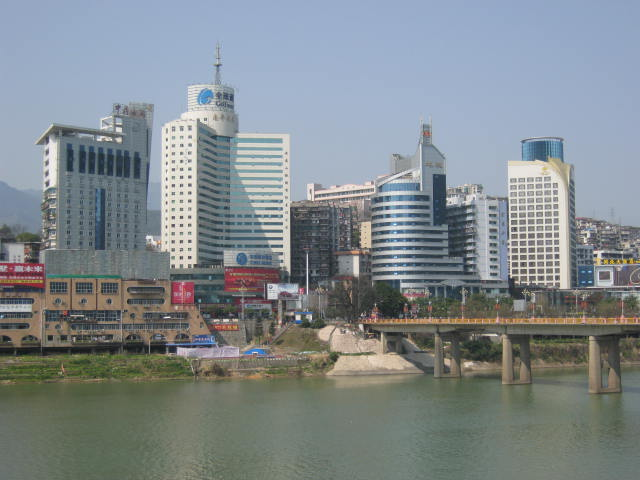
Shuinan bridge

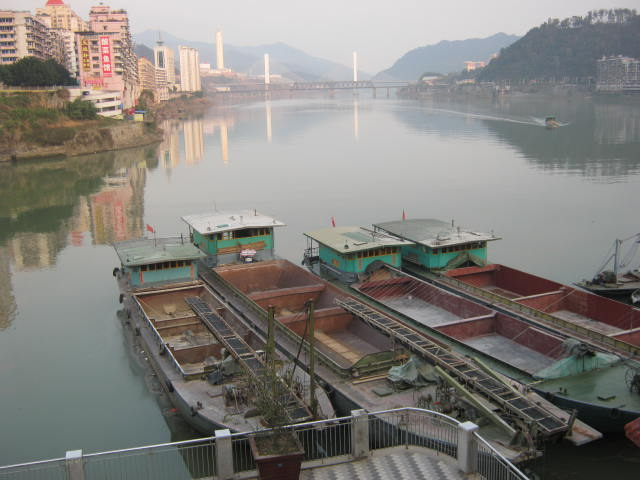
Min River

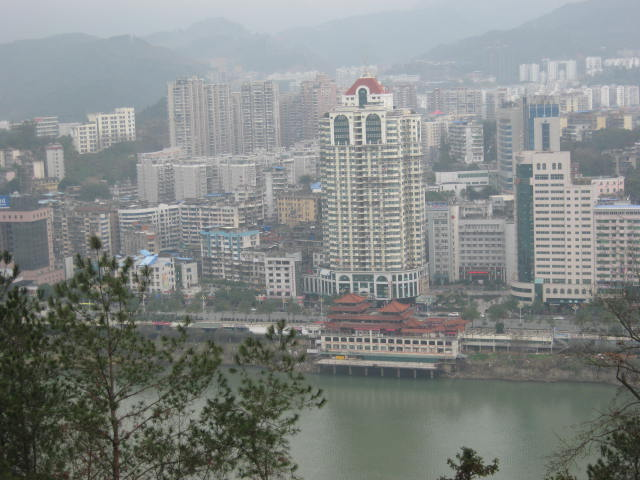
Nanping from Botanical Garden

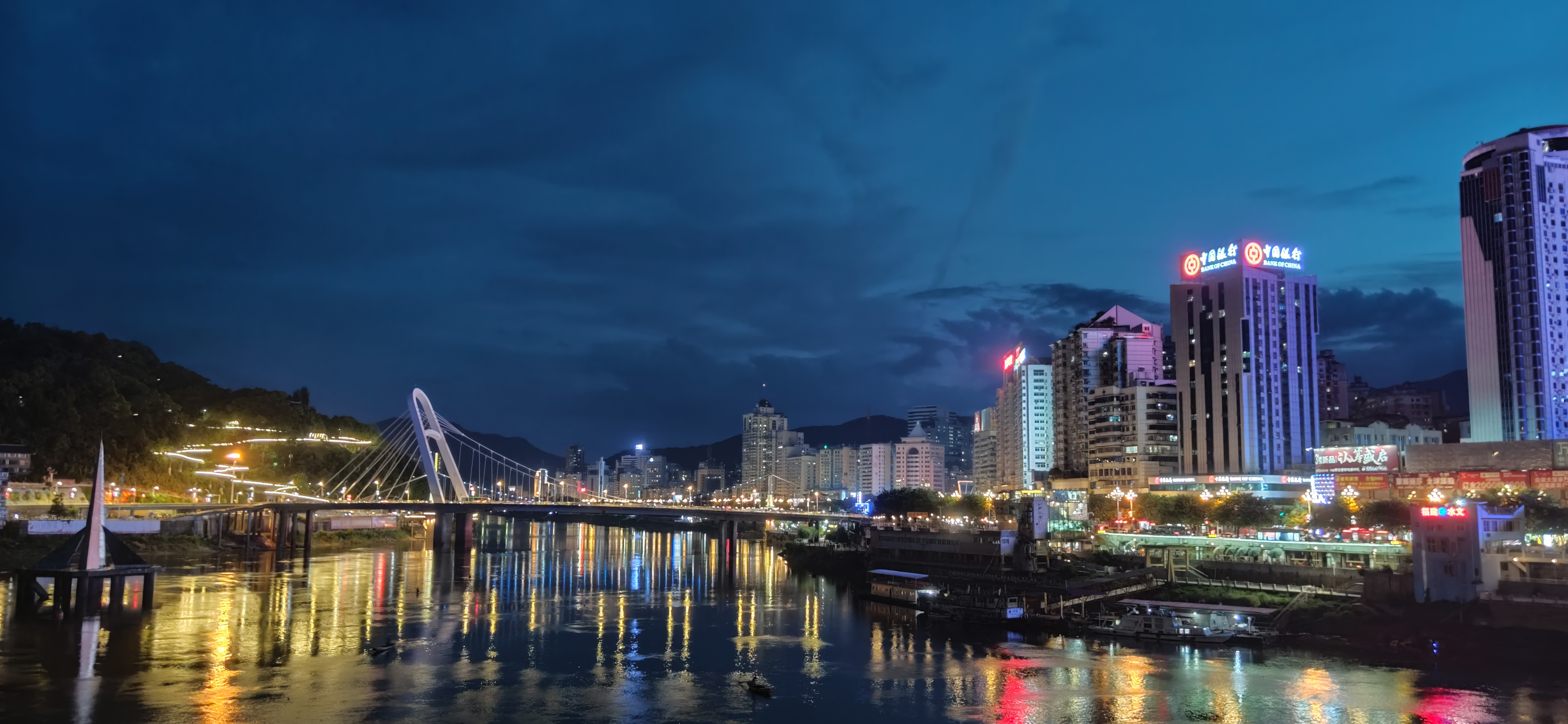
Yanping Night View

== See also ==
- Wuyi New Area
