= Tsuchi =

Tsuchi may refer to:

- Chuxi tulou group, a group of earthen structures in Fujian Province
- Di (Chinese concept) (地), Japanese character for Earth
- Tsuchi (film), a 1939 film directed by Tomu Uchida
