= Hua'an County =

Hua'an County 华安县
- County
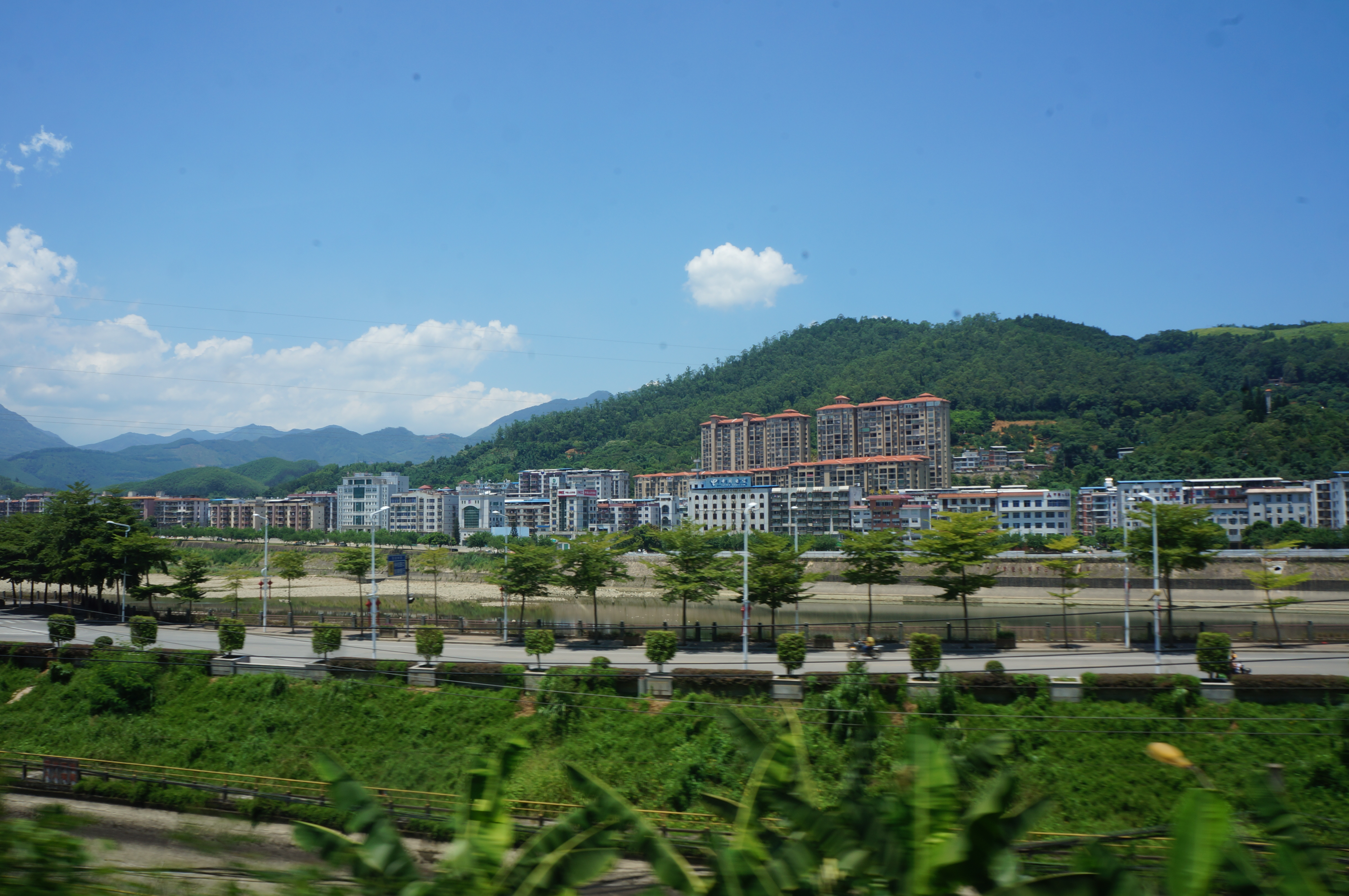

- Location in Fujian
- Coordinates: 24°50′N 117°31′E
- Country: People's Republic of China
- Province: Fujian
- Prefecture-level city: Zhangzhou

Area
  - Total: 2,310 km^{2} (890 sq mi)

Population (2020 census)
  - Total: 134,276
  - Density: 58.1/km^{2} (151/sq mi)
- Time zone: UTC+8 (China Standard)

Hua'an (simplified Chinese: 华安县; traditional Chinese: 華安縣; pinyin: Huá'ān Xiàn; Pe̍h-ōe-jī: Hôa-an-koān) is a county of Zhangzhou City, in the far south of Fujian province, People's Republic of China.

The county comprises most of the lower watershed of the Jiulong River's north branch (九龙江北溪) and has long been a transport corridor. The first rail connection to the port of Xiamen, laid during the Great Leap Forward era, came down this valley.

The county seat is Huafeng (华丰镇). East of there, up a tributary valley, is Xiandu town (仙都镇), which features some prime examples of Tulou and Fujian Tulou.

== Climate ==
Climate data for Hua'an, elevation 167 m (548 ft), (1991–2020 normals, extremes 1981–2010)
Month	Jan	Feb	Mar	Apr	May	Jun	Jul	Aug	Sep	Oct	Nov	Dec	Year
Record high °C (°F)	29.8 (85.6)	32.4 (90.3)	33.3 (91.9)	35.6 (96.1)	38.0 (100.4)	38.7 (101.7)	41.2 (106.2)	39.5 (103.1)	38.6 (101.5)	36.6 (97.9)	35.9 (96.6)	30.1 (86.2)	41.2 (106.2)
Mean daily maximum °C (°F)	18.9 (66.0)	20.0 (68.0)	22.2 (72.0)	26.4 (79.5)	29.4 (84.9)	31.6 (88.9)	34.4 (93.9)	33.9 (93.0)	32.2 (90.0)	29.1 (84.4)	25.1 (77.2)	20.5 (68.9)	27.0 (80.6)
Daily mean °C (°F)	12.9 (55.2)	14.3 (57.7)	16.7 (62.1)	20.8 (69.4)	24.0 (75.2)	26.4 (79.5)	28.1 (82.6)	27.6 (81.7)	26.2 (79.2)	22.7 (72.9)	18.7 (65.7)	14.1 (57.4)	21.0 (69.9)
Mean daily minimum °C (°F)	9.2 (48.6)	10.6 (51.1)	13.1 (55.6)	17.0 (62.6)	20.5 (68.9)	23.2 (73.8)	24.1 (75.4)	23.9 (75.0)	22.5 (72.5)	18.5 (65.3)	14.6 (58.3)	10.1 (50.2)	17.3 (63.1)
Record low °C (°F)	−2.4 (27.7)	−0.8 (30.6)	−0.4 (31.3)	5.5 (41.9)	11.0 (51.8)	15.5 (59.9)	19.5 (67.1)	19.8 (67.6)	14.6 (58.3)	8.1 (46.6)	1.0 (33.8)	−2.2 (28.0)	−2.4 (27.7)
Average precipitation mm (inches)	55.3 (2.18)	79.6 (3.13)	139.5 (5.49)	148.7 (5.85)	214.2 (8.43)	288.8 (11.37)	179.9 (7.08)	266.7 (10.50)	151.9 (5.98)	61.1 (2.41)	38.2 (1.50)	42.3 (1.67)	1,666.2 (65.59)
Average precipitation days (≥ 0.1 mm)	8.3	11.4	15.7	15.6	18.2	19.3	14.1	17.6	12.2	5.9	5.6	6.8	150.7
Average snowy days	0.1	0	0	0	0	0	0	0	0	0	0	0	0.1
Average relative humidity (%)	74	77	79	79	81	83	78	81	78	73	74	73	78
Mean monthly sunshine hours	129.3	98.8	98.8	114.3	120.9	136.0	212.5	189.8	178.3	181.2	157.5	149.9	1,767.3
Percentage possible sunshine	39	31	26	30	29	33	51	47	49	51	48	46	40
Source: China Meteorological Administration

== Administrative divisions ==
Towns:

- Huafeng (华丰镇), Fengshan (丰山镇), Shajian (沙建镇), Xinxu (新圩镇), Gao'an (高安镇), Xiandu (仙都镇)

Townships:

- Makeng Township (马坑乡), Hulin Township (湖林乡), Gaoche Township (高车乡)
