= Tianluokeng Tulou cluster =

Tianluokeng Tulou Cluster
UNESCO World Heritage Site
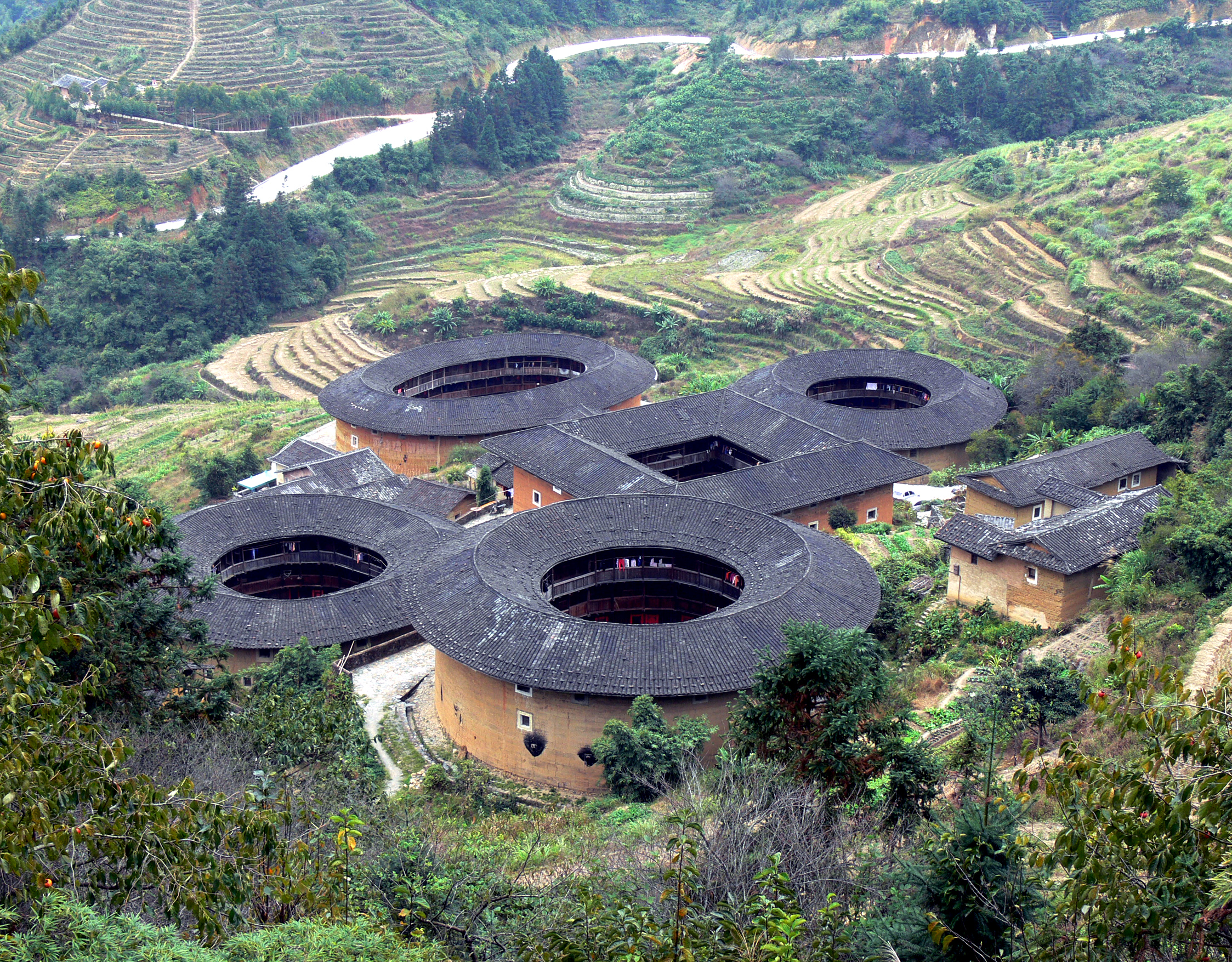

- Location within Fujian
- Location: Tianluokeng, Shuyang, Nanjing County, Fujian, China
- Part of: Fujian tulou
- Criteria: Cultural: (iii), (iv), (v)
- Reference: 1113-006
- Inscription: 2008 (32nd Session)
- Area: 8.85 ha (21.9 acres)
- Buffer zone: 67.8 ha (168 acres)
- Coordinates: 24°35′14″N 117°03′19″E

Tianluokeng tulou cluster (Note: simplified Chinese: 田螺坑土楼群; traditional Chinese: 田螺坑土樓群; pinyin: Tiánluókēng tǔlóu qún) is one of the better known groups of Fujian tulou. It is located in the village of Tianluokeng (lit. 'snail pit') in the town of Shuyang, Nanjing County, southern Fujian province.

The cluster consists of a square earth building at the center of a quincunx, surrounded by four round earth buildings (or more exactly, 3 round earth buildings and one oval shape earth building), figuratively nicknamed "four dishes one soup". (Note: 四菜一汤 pinyin: sìcài yītāng; lit. 'four dishes with a soup')

A tulou (lit. "earth building") is a unique architecture found only in the mountainous areas bordering Fujian and Guangdong in southern China. The "earth building" is an enclosed building, usually square or circular in shape, with a very thick earth wall (up to 6 feet thick) and wooden skeletons, from three to five stories high, housing up to 80 families. These earth buildings have only one entrance, guarded by 4–5-inch-thick (100–130 mm) wooden doors re-enforced with an outer shell of iron plate. The top level of these earth building have gun holes for defense against bandits. In spite of the earth wall, some of them are more than 700 years old, surviving through centuries of exposure to the natural elements, including earthquakes. There are more than 35,000 earth buildings to be found in southern China, among them a little over 3,000 have been classified as Fujian Tulou.

On July 7, 2008, at the UNESCO 32nd session held in Quebec City, Canada, the Tianluokeng Tulou cluster was inscribed as one of 46 Fujian Tulou World Heritage Sites.

The five earth buildings at the Snail Pit village are:

- The square earth building named Buyun building(Reaching the Cloud building) at the center of the quincunx. It was the first earth building at this site, built in 1796. It is three stories high, each story has 26 rooms, four sets of stairs, and a circular corridor in front of the rooms. The Buyun building was burnt down by bandits in 1936, and rebuilt in 1953 according to the original shape.
- The Hechang building, a three-story-high round earth building.
- Zhenchang building, three-story, round shape, 26 rooms per story, built in 1930.
- Ruiyun building, built in 1936.
- The last Wenchang building of 1966, three stories, 32 rooms per story.

The cluster is located about four hours drive by bus or taxi from Xiamen, through winding and bumpy narrow mountain roads (Fujian Provincial Highway 309 (S309), or county roads).

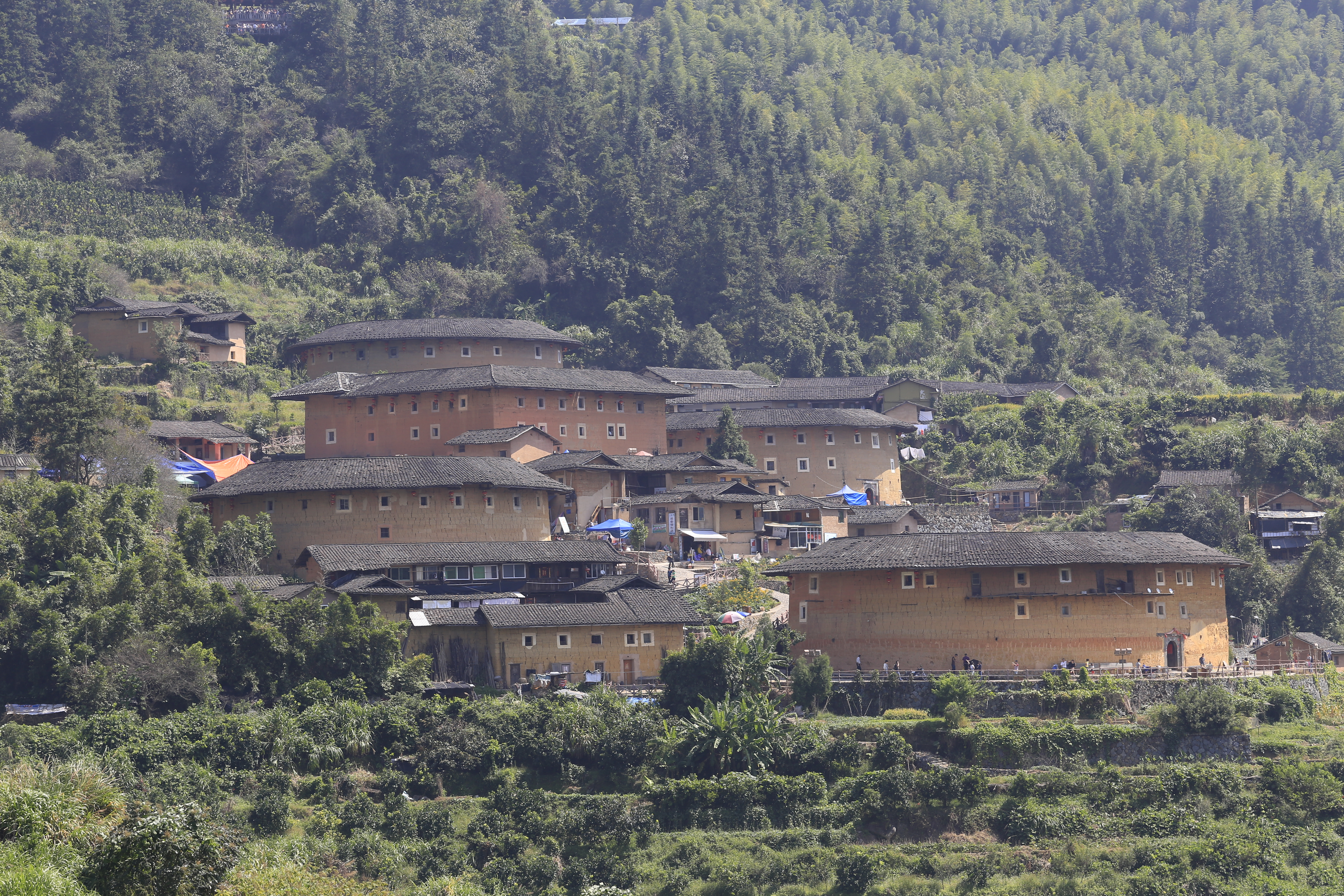
Earth building group at TianLuokeng

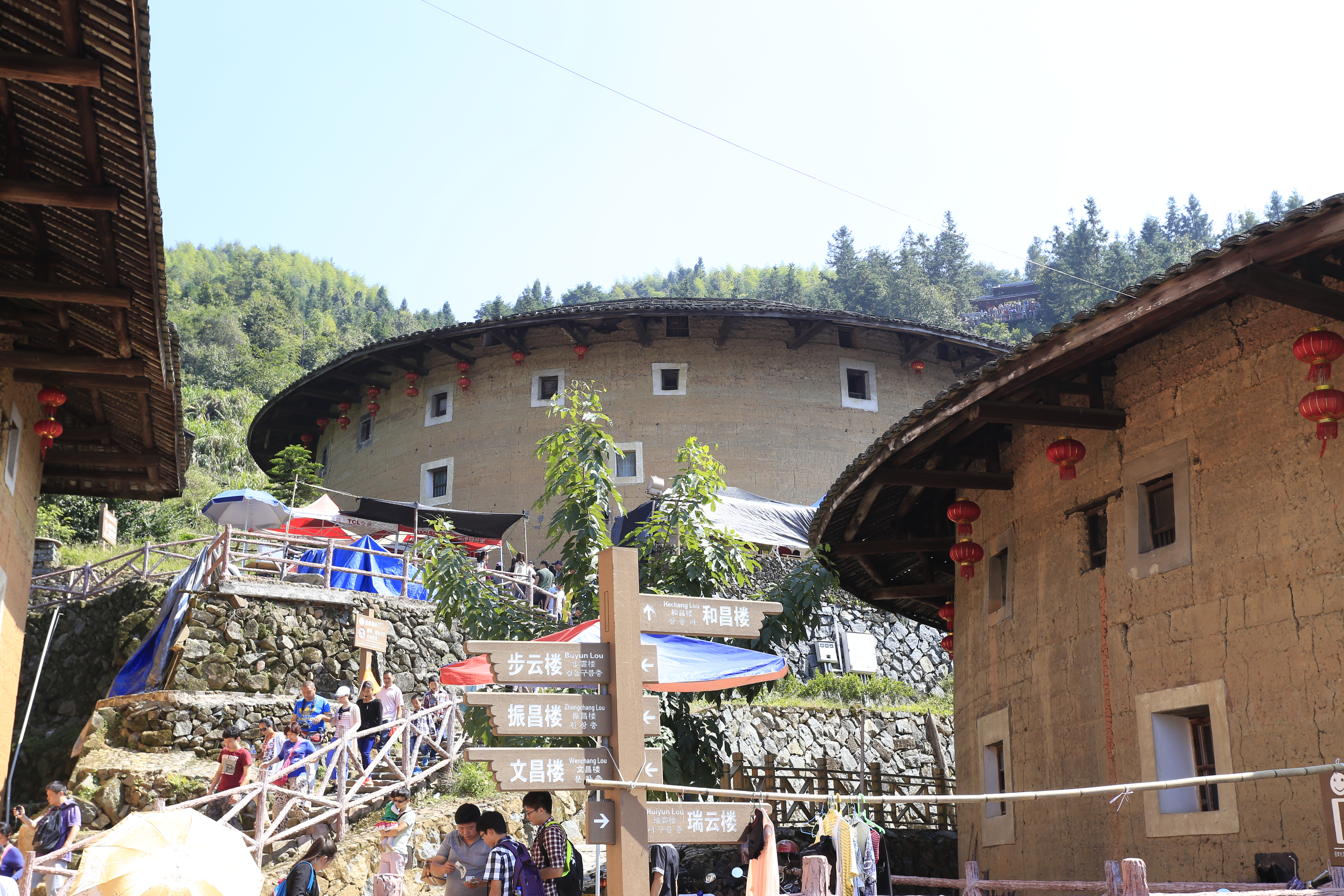
Interior of Tianluokeng Tulou cluster

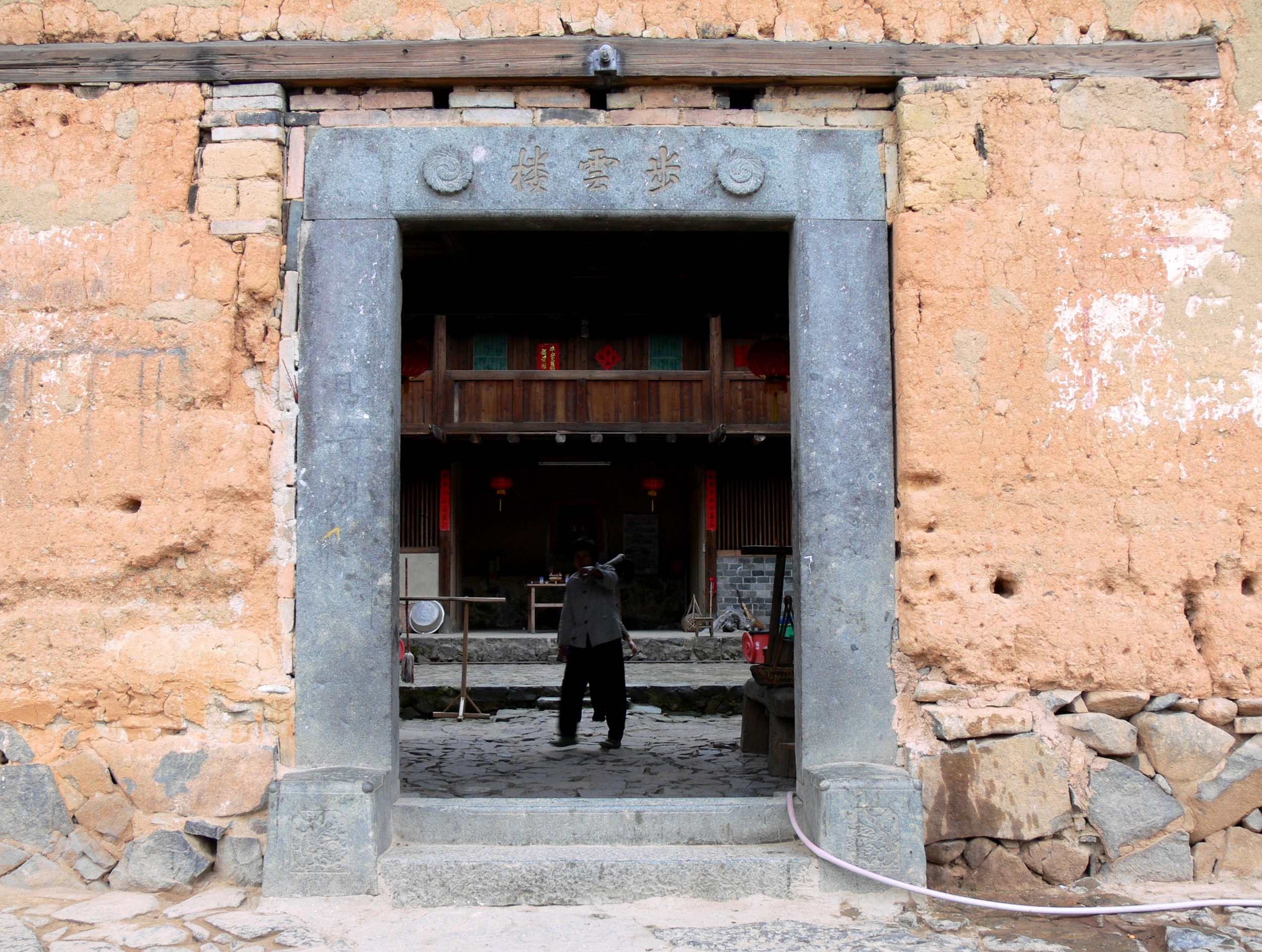
Buyun building main gate

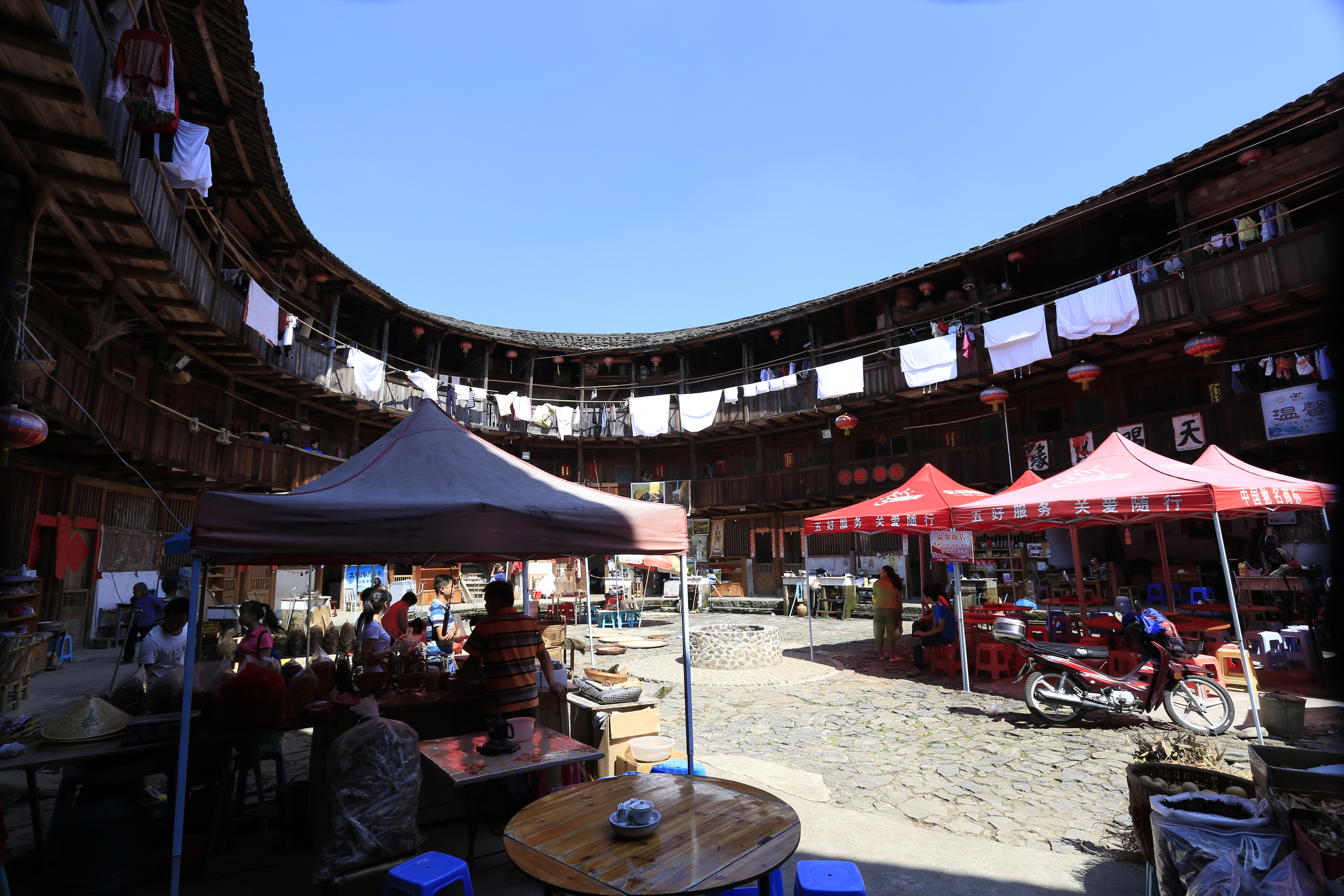
Interior of Wenchang earth building
