= Fujian tulou =

Chinese rural dwellings

Fujian Tulou
UNESCO World Heritage Site
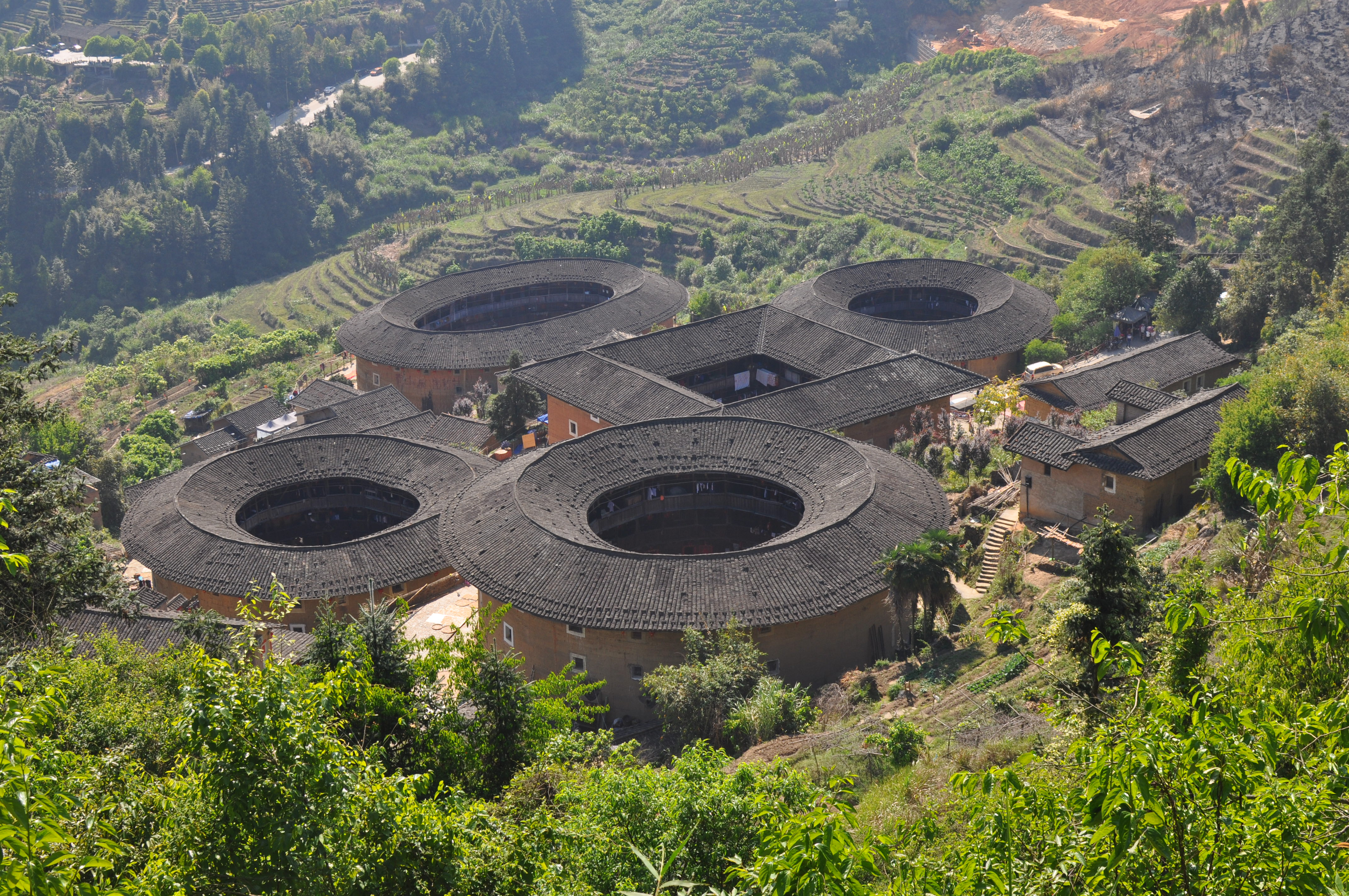
- Tianluokeng Tulou cluster

- Location within Fujian Location within China
- Location: Fujian, China
- Includes: 1. Chuxi Tulou cluster 2. Hongkeng Tulou cluster 3. Gaobei Tulou cluster 4. Yanxiang Lou; 5. Zhenfu Lou; 6. Tianluokeng Tulou cluster 7. Hekeng Tulou cluster 8. Huaiyuan Lou; 9. Hegui Lou; 10. Dadi Tulou cluster
- Criteria: Cultural: (iii), (iv), (v)
- Reference: 1113
- Inscription: 2008 (32nd Session)
- Area: 152.65 ha (377.2 acres)
- Buffer zone: 934.59 ha (2,309.4 acres)
- Coordinates: 25°1′23″N 117°41′9″E

Chinese name
- Simplified Chinese: 福建土楼
- Traditional Chinese: 福建土樓
- Literal meaning: "Fujian earthen buildings"
Transcriptions
Standard Mandarin
- Hanyu Pinyin: Fújiàn tǔlóu
- IPA: [fǔ.tɕjɛ̂n tʰù.lǒʊ]
Hakka
- Romanization: Fuk-kien thú-lèu
Yue: Cantonese
- Yale Romanization: Fūk-gin tóu-làuh
- Jyutping: Fuk1-gin3 tou2-lau4
Southern Min
- Tâi-lô: Hok-kiàn thóo-lâu

The Fujian tulou (simplified Chinese: 福建土楼; traditional Chinese: 福建土樓; pinyin: Fújiàn tǔlóu; lit. 'Fujian earthen buildings') are Chinese rural dwellings unique to the Hakka in the mountainous areas in southeastern Fujian, China. They were mostly built between the 12th and the 20th centuries.

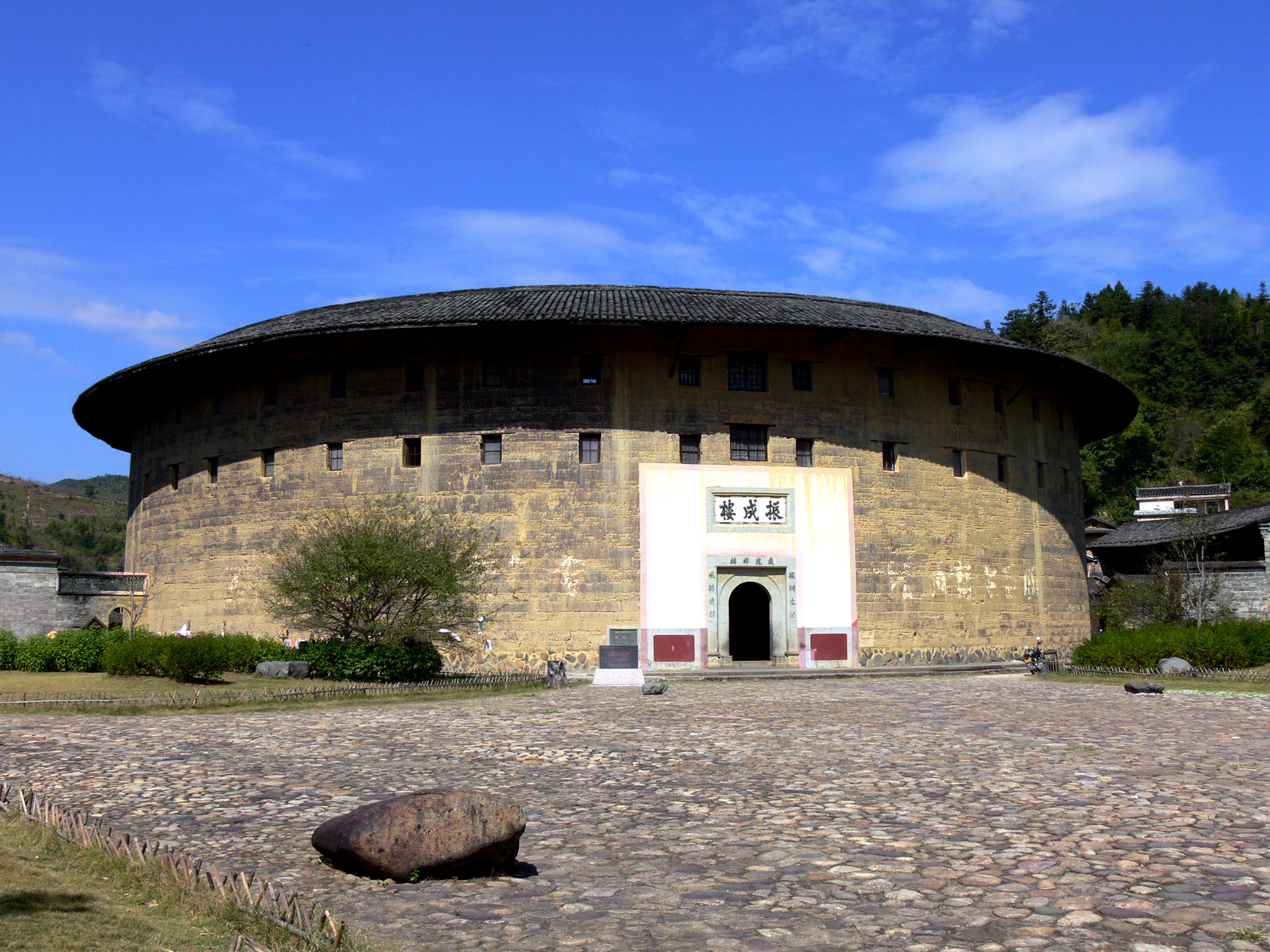
Zhencheng Lou

A tulou is usually a large, enclosed and fortified earth building, most commonly rectangular or circular in configuration, with very thick load-bearing rammed earth walls between three and five stories high and housing up to 800 people. Smaller interior buildings are often enclosed by these huge peripheral walls which can contain halls, storehouses, wells and living areas, the whole structure resembling a small fortified city.

The fortified outer structures are formed by compacting earth, mixed with stone, bamboo, wood and other readily available materials to form walls up to 6 feet (1.8 m) thick. Branches, strips of wood and bamboo chips are often laid in the wall as additional reinforcement. The result is a well-lit, well-ventilated, windproof and earthquake-proof building that is warm in winter and cool in summer. Tulous usually have only one main gate, guarded by 4–5-inch-thick (100–130 mm) wooden doors reinforced with an outer shell of iron plate. The top level of these earth buildings has gun holes for defensive purposes.

Most of the tulou (with the exception of the Dadi tulou cluster in Hua'an county) are found in a relatively small geographical area, straddling the boundary between the Yongding, Nanjing, and Pinghe counties of Fujian province. Some of tulous are also found in neighboring Guangdong province such as in eastern Dabu County of Meizhou. These are administered as a single tourist site (known as the Nanjing Tulou Scenic Area) with its entrance in Shuyang township (Nanjing County, Zhangzhou). Visits to this area therefore usually comprise a tour of the most distinctive and famous across both the "Yongding" (Gaobei Tulou cluster, Hongkeng Tulou cluster, Chuxi Tulou cluster, Zhenfulou Earthen House, and Yanxianglou Earthen House) and "Nanjing" (Tianluokeng Tulou cluster, Hekeng Tulou cluster, Heguilou Earthen House, and Huaiyuanlou Earthen House) tulou groups.

A total of 46 Fujian tulou sites were inscribed in 2008 by UNESCO as World Heritage Site, as "exceptional examples of a building tradition and function exemplifying a particular type of communal living and defensive organization [in a] harmonious relationship with their environment". The inscribed sites include Chuxi Tulou cluster, Tianluokeng Tulou cluster, Hekeng Tulou cluster, Gaobei Tulou cluster, Dadi Tulou cluster, Hongkeng Tulou cluster, Yangxian Lou, Huiyuan Lou, Zhengfu Lou, and Hegui Lou.

== Terminology ==
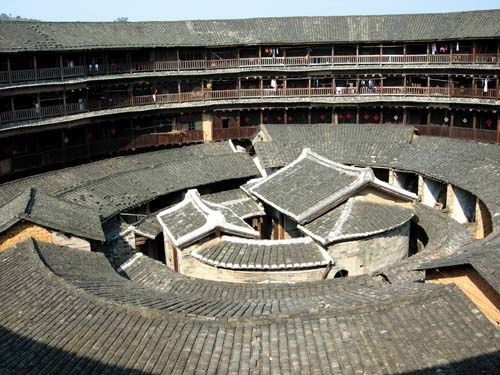
Chengqilou

Since the 1980s, the Fujian Tulou has been variously called "Hakka tulou", "earth dwelling", "round stronghouse" or simply "Tulou". Tu lou (土樓) literally translates as earthen structures. Fujian Tulous's literal translation is "Fujian earthen structures", and scholars of Chinese architecture have recently standardized the term Fujian Tulou.

Early publications on tulous (the first of which appeared in a journal of Nanjing Institute of Technology in 1957) talked about tulous as the homes of Hakka people, primarily in Yongding County of southwestern Fujian. However, by the 1980s a substantial amount of research was also published on the tulous of the Hakkas' neighbors, the Southern Fujian people (known in Chinese as the Minnan people). Those are primarily found in to the east of Yongding, in particular in Nanjing County and Pinghe County of southeastern Fujian.

Parts of Hakka tulou belong to the Fujian Tulou category. While all south Fujian tulous belong to the Fujian Tulou category, they do not belong to "Hakka Tulou". In effect, "Fujian Tulou" is not a synonym for "tulou", but rather a special subgroup of the latter. There are more than 20,000 tulous in Fujian, while there are only around three thousand "Fujian Tulou" located in the southwestern region. Fujian Tulou is however the official name adopted by UNESCO for all dwellings of this type.

Based on the literal meaning of the Chinese words tu (土; "earth") and lou (樓; "[tall] building"), one may think of the term "tulou" as a generic description of a rammed-earth building. However, this would not be a useful definition, since, as the scholar of China's traditional architecture Huang Hanmin notes, rammed-earth building of one kind or another can be found in virtually all parts of China. Instead, it is preferable to use the definition actually used in Fujian: a tulou is a large building, constructed with load-bearing rammed earth walls, and used as a residence by a community (a group of families). The first part of the definition contrasts tulous with structures that merely use rammed earth around the load-bearing wooden frame; the second part distinguishes tulous from small, single-family residencies.

Based on the above definition, Huang Hanmin believes that out of the great variety of rammed-earth vernacular architecture of China, only the following regional styles, all associated with either Hakka or Minnan people, can be called "tulou" (at least in Chinese):

- "Guangdong tulou": the weilongwu (圍龍屋) compounds of the northern Guangdong, and the fortified weiwu (圍屋) compounds of the northeastern Guangdong;
- "Jiangxi tulou": the tuweizi (土圍子) compounds of the southern Jiangxi;
- "Fujian tulou": several types of tulou of southern Fujian.

While the Guangdong and Jiangxi tulous are associated with the Hakka people, among the Fujian tulou there are several types, some of which are characteristic of the Hakka, and others, of the Minnan.

For the Fujian Tulou specifically, Huang Hanmin gives the following definition: "A large multi-story building in southeast Fujian mountainous region for large community living and defense, built with weight bearing rammed earth wall and wood frame structure."

== Notable Fujian tulou ==
=== Chuxi Tulou cluster ===
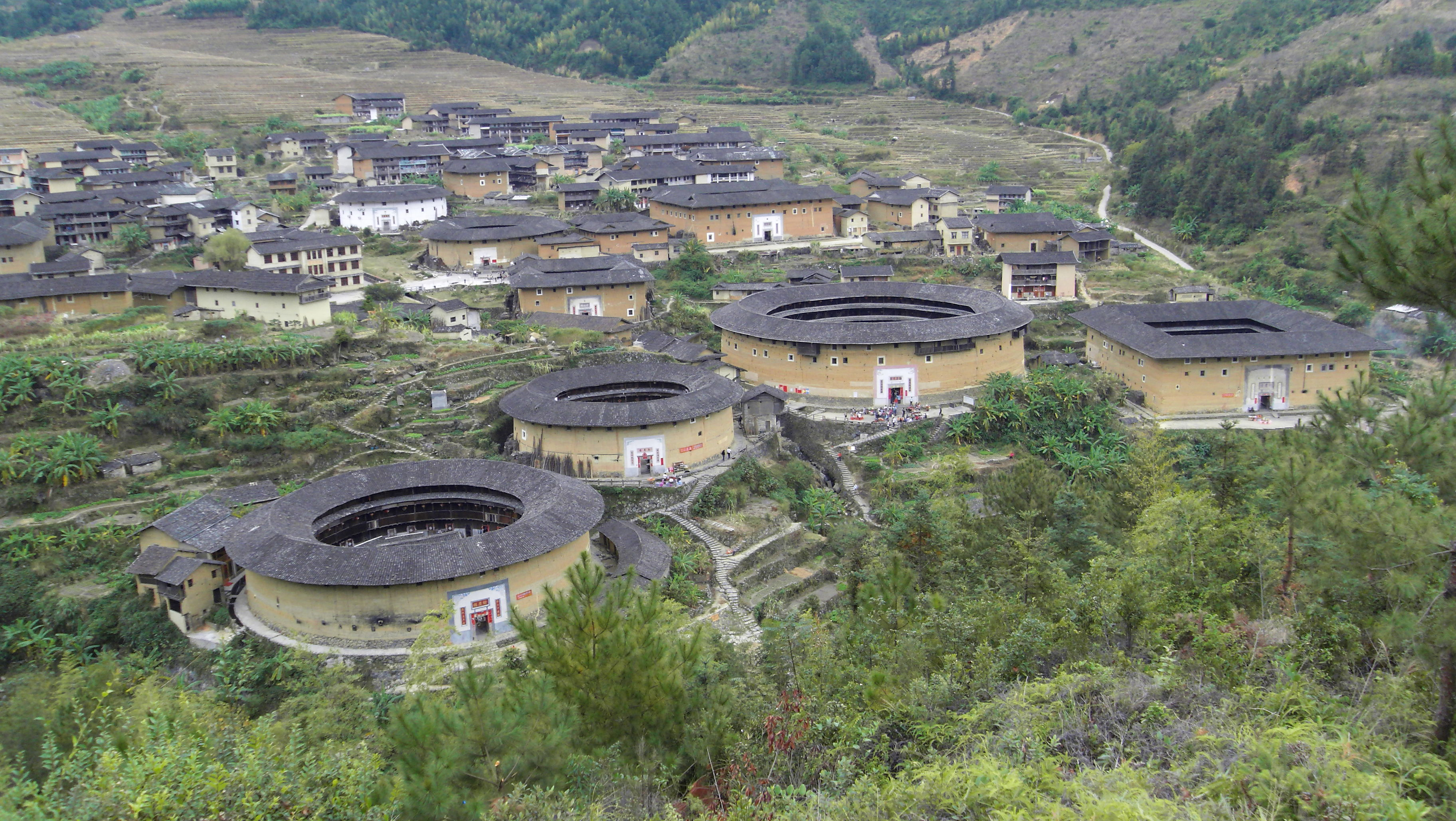
Chuxi Tulou cluster from look out

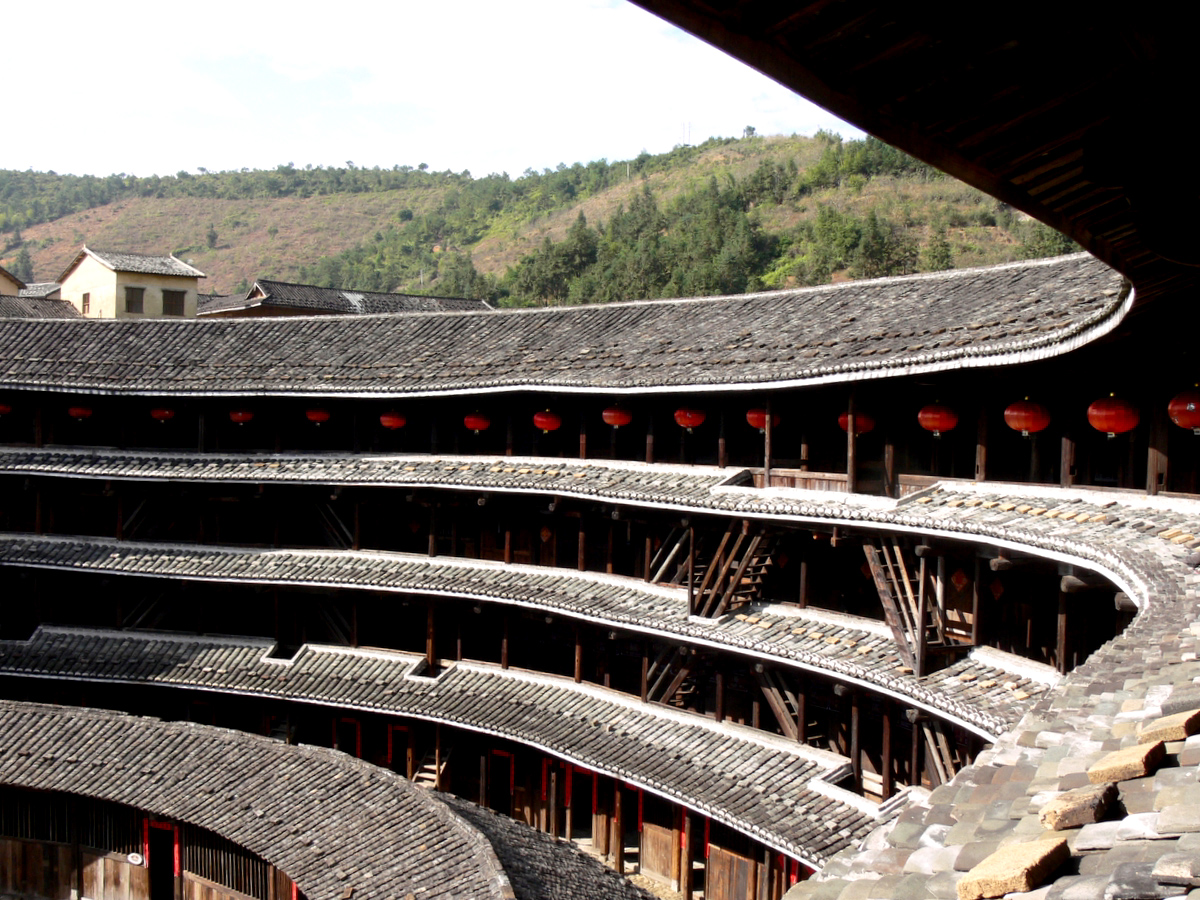
Jiqing Lou

Chuxi Tulou cluster (初溪土樓群), located in Yongding County, Xiayang township, Chuxi village. Inscribed as UNESCO World Heritage site 1113-001.

- Jiqinglou, the largest round tulou, and also the oldest in this cluster, was built in 1419 during the reign of the Yongle Emperor of the Ming dynasty. It consists of two concentric rings, the outer ring building is four stories tall, with 53 rooms on each level. The outer ring has 72 staircases. The second ring is a one-story building.

=== Zhencheng Lou ===
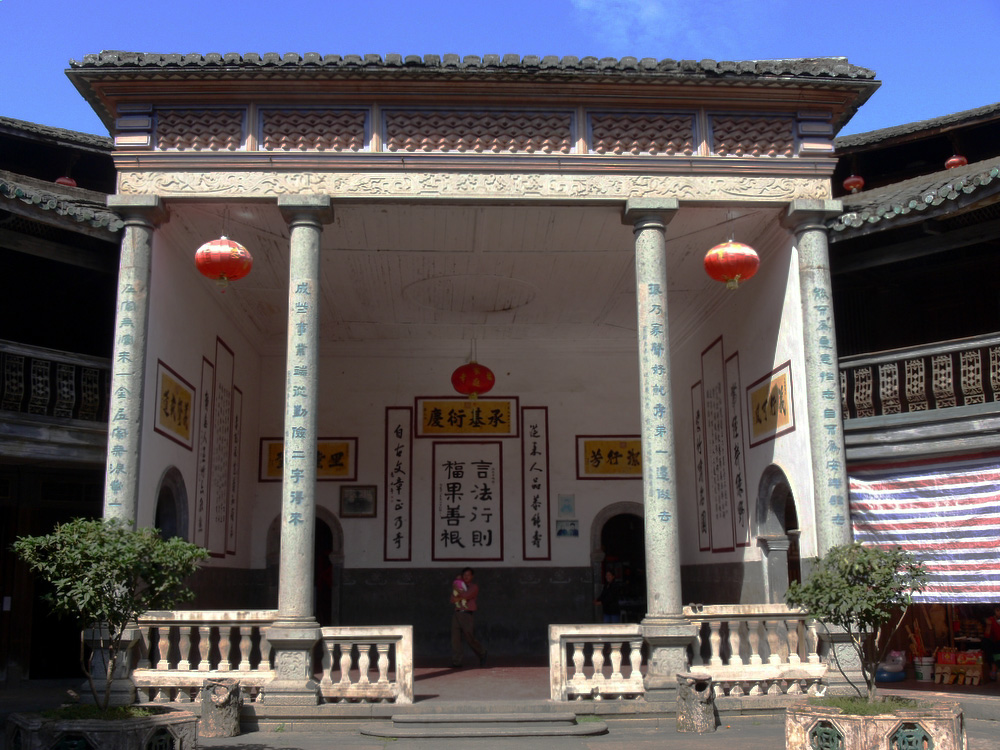
Ancestral hall of Zhengchenglou

Zhenchenglou (振成樓), nicknamed "the prince of tulou", belongs to Hongkeng Tulou cluster. It is located in Hongkeng village, Hukeng township of Yongding County and was inscribed as UNESCO World Heritage 1113-002. It was built in 1912 by the descendants of a rich tobacco merchant. Zhenchenglou is a double ring tulou, its outer ring being four stories high with a total of 184 rooms, the inner ring having two stories with 32 rooms. The outer ring was partitioned into four segments according to the Bagua concept of Chinese Fengshui.

Western influence is evident in the Greek style columns of the ancestral hall, and in the wrought iron railing of the second level corridor.

=== Chengqi Lou ===
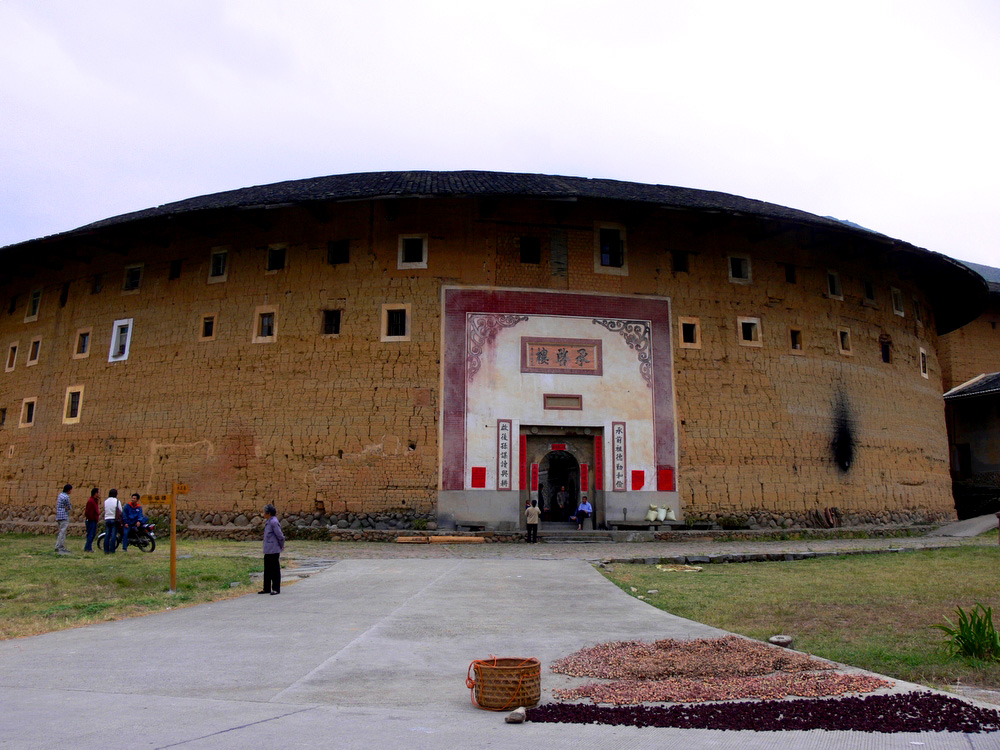
King of Tulou- Chengqilou

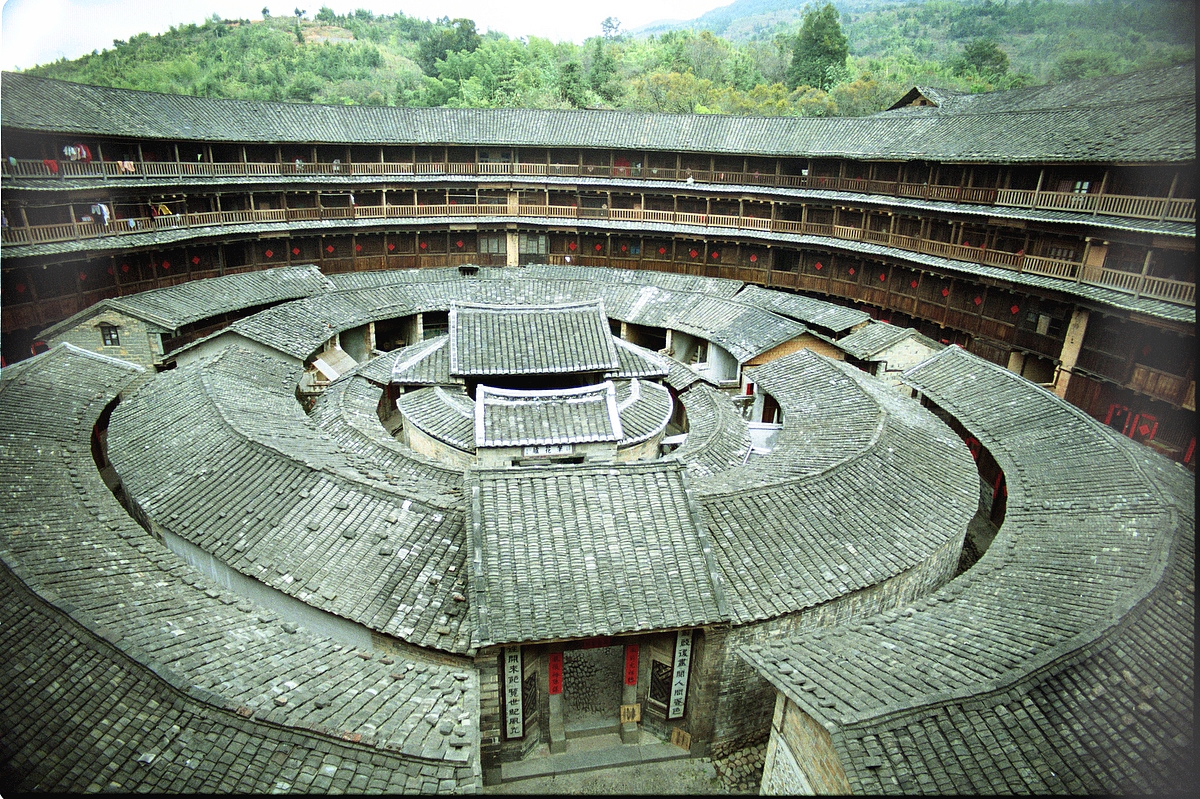
Four concentric ring architecture of Chengqi Lou

Chengqilou (承啟楼) nicknamed "the king of tulou", of Gaobei Tulou cluster (高北土楼群) at Gaobei Village (Gaotou Township) of Yongding County was built in 1709, and was inscribed as UNESCO World Heritage Site 1113-003 in 2008. It is a massive round tulou with four concentric rings surrounding an ancestral hall at the center, the outer ring measuring 62.6 meters in diameter and being four stories tall, containing 288 rooms, with 72 rooms on each level, along with a circular corridor on the 2nd to 4th floors, with four sets of staircases at cardinal points connecting the ground to the top floors. A large outward-extending roof covers the main ring. The ground floor rooms serve as kitchens for family branches, the second level rooms serve as grain storage rooms, and the 3rd and 4th floor rooms are living quarters and bedrooms. The second ring of 80 rooms is two stories high, with 40 rooms on each level, the third ring serving as a community library, measuring a story with 32 rooms. There are 370 rooms in total. The 4th ring is a circular-covered corridor surrounding the ancestral hall. If a person stayed for one night in each room, it would take him more than a year to go through all the rooms. The ancestral hall is at the center. Chengqilou has two main gates and two side gates. The 15th-generation Jiang clan with 57 families and 300 people live here. At its heyday, there were more than 80 family branches living in Chengqilou.

Other buildings in this cluster include: a three-ring Shenyuanlou with an outer ring 70 meters in diameter, a Wujiaolou (pentagon) with an irregular pentagonal floor plan, and a rectangular tulou, the Shi-Ze Lou.

=== Tianluokeng Tulou cluster ===
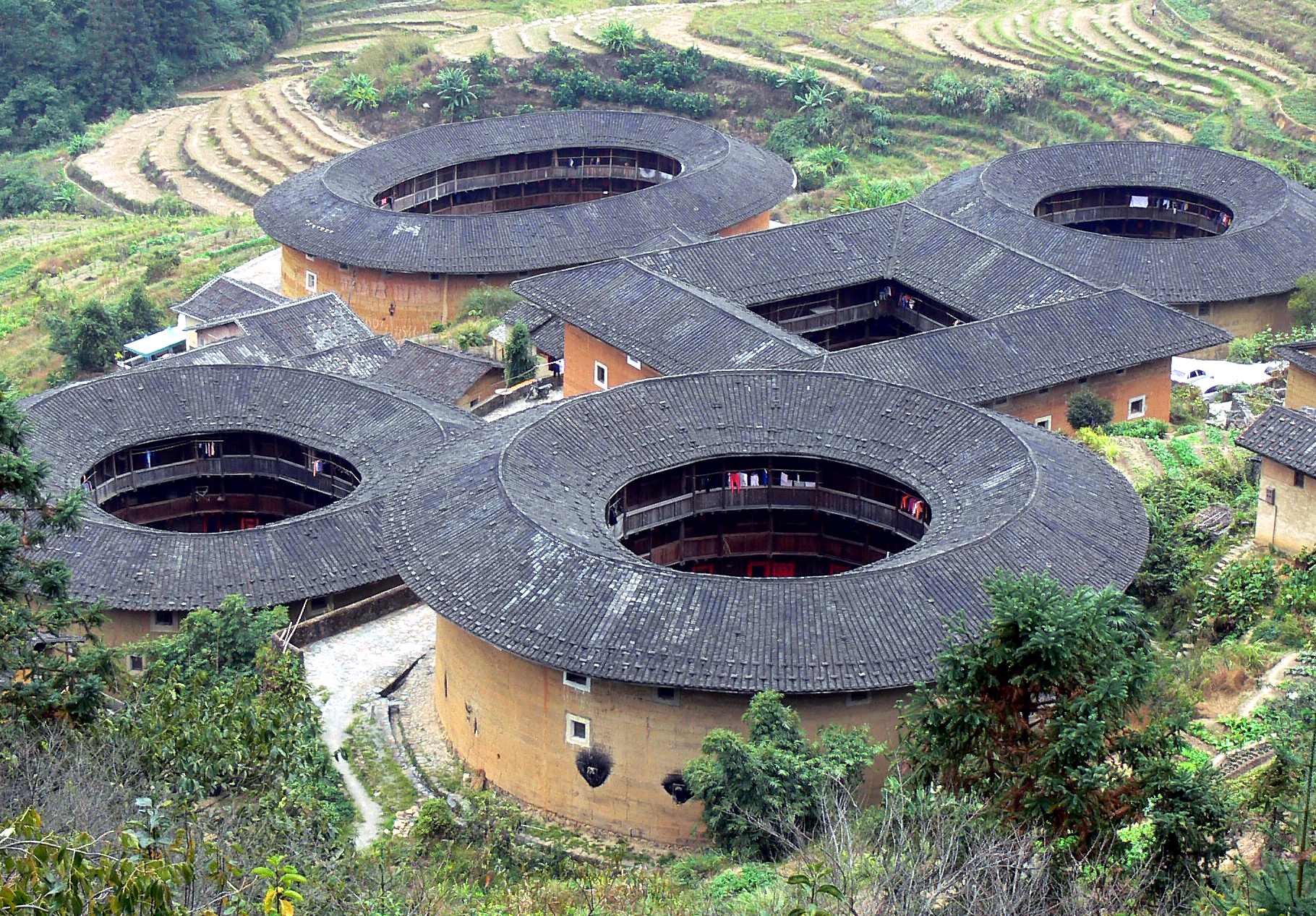
Tianluokeng tulou cluster

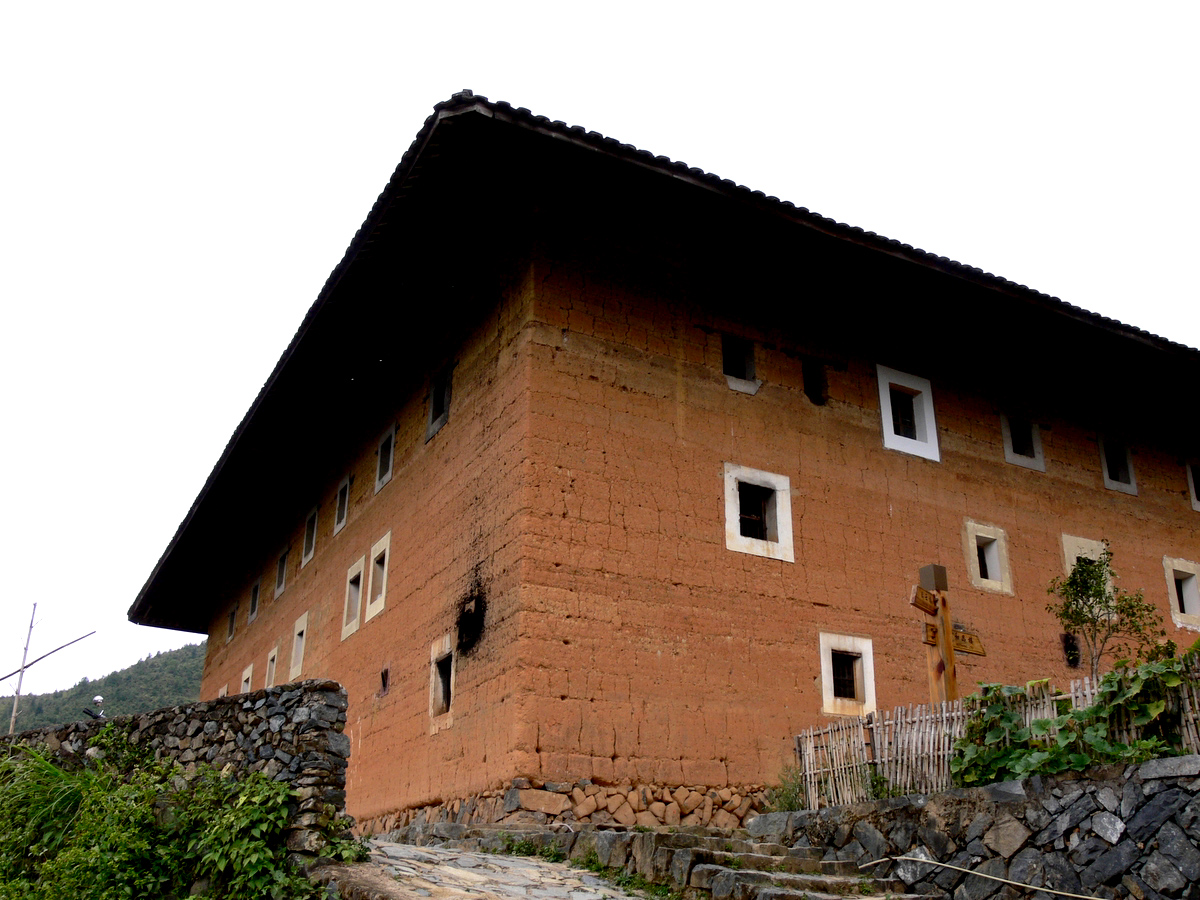
Buyunlou

Tianluokeng Tulou cluster (田螺坑土楼群) is tulou quintet cluster located at Fujian province, Zhangzhou City, Nanjing County, Shuyang Township, Tian Luo Keng Village (literally "Snail Pit" Village) in southern China, about four hours drive by motor coach or taxi from Xiamen, through winding and bumpy narrow mountain roads. It consists of five tulous with a square "Buyunlou" at the center, surrounded by three rotunda tulous and an oval tulou, forming a pattern of "four dishes and a soup" (四菜一湯). The five earth buildings at the Snail Pit village are:

- The square Buyunlou (Reaching the Cloud building) at the center of the quincunx. It was the first tulou at this site, built in 1796. It is three stories high, each story has 26 rooms, four sets of stairs, and a go around corridor in front of the rooms at each level. The Buyun building was burnt down by bandits in 1936, rebuilt in 1953 according to the original plan.
- The Hechang building, a three-story-high round earth building,
- Zhenchang building, three stories, round shape, 26 rooms per story, built in 1930
- Ruiyun building, built in 1936, three stories, 26 rooms per floor.
- The oval shape Wenchang building of 1966, three stories, 32 rooms per floor.

=== Yuchang Lou ===
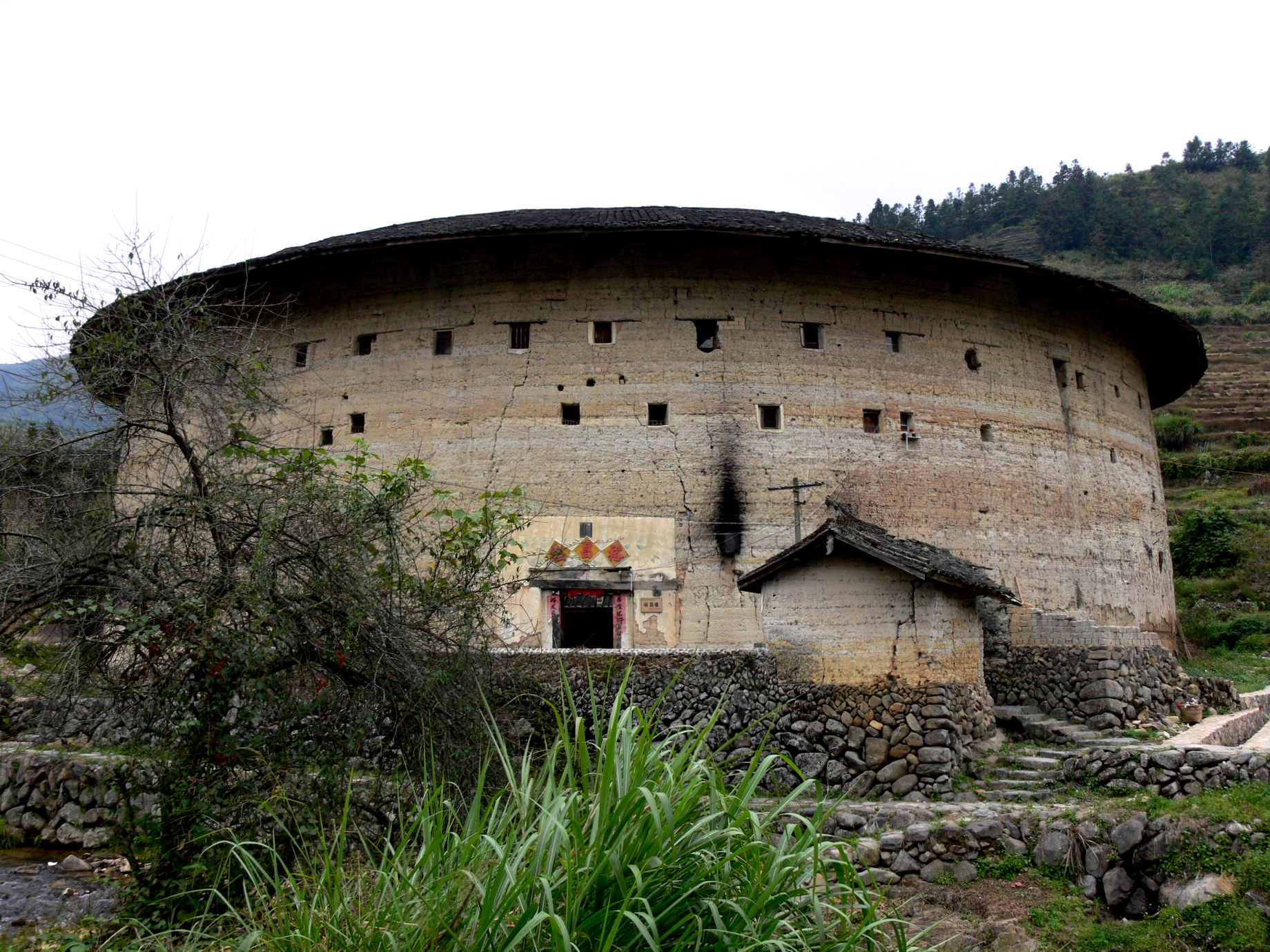
Five-story Yuchanglou built in 1308

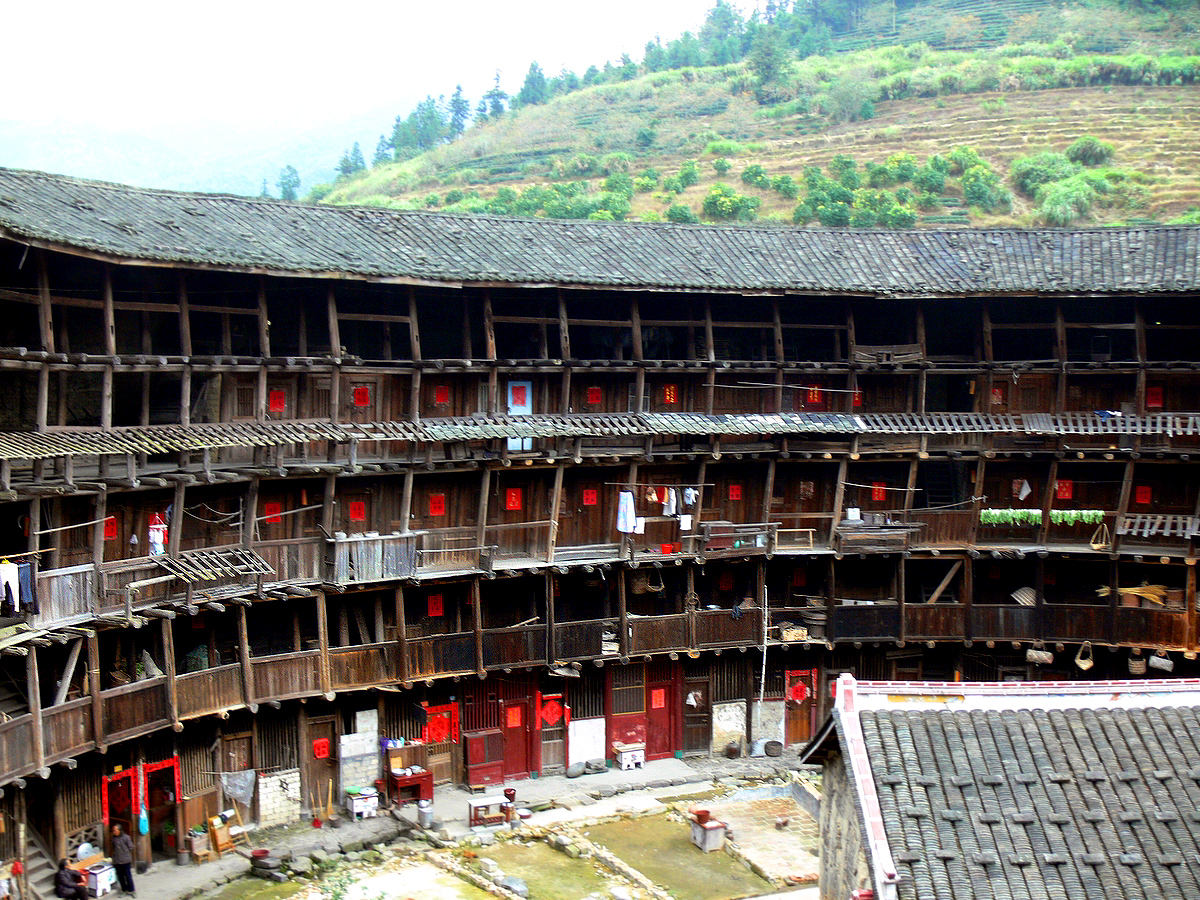
Zigzag structure of Yuchanglou

Yuchanglou (裕昌樓) is a five-story tulou located at Nanjing County, Shuyang Town, Xiabanliao Village. It was built in 1308 Yuan dynasty by the Liu family clan. It is one of the oldest and tallest tulou in China. Yuchanglou has been nicknamed the "zigzag building", because the vertical wooden post structure is not straight and perpendicular, but zigzags left and right. It was built that way due to an error measuring the building materials. But in spite of this apparent infirmity, this tall tulou withstood 700 years of natural elements and social turmoil. Yuchanglou's outer ring is 36 m in diameter and boasts five stories, with 50 rooms on each floor, 270 in total.

Each of the 25 kitchens on the ground floor at the back half of the circle has a private water well beside its stove. This is the only tulou in all Fujian with such water supply.

There was a one-story inner-ring house surrounding the ancestral hall as late as 2003. This part of the building stood intact for nearly 700 years until it was dismantled after 2003.

=== Eryilou ===
Eryilou (二宜樓) of Dadi Tulou cluster is located at Zhangzhou City, Hua'an County, Xiandu Township, Dadi Village. Built in 1770 it consists of a four-story outer ring and a one-story inner ring. The outer ring is 71 meters in diameter, with 48 rooms on each level. Eryilou has no circular corridor at the front of each upper level, instead it has a back corridor adjacent to the wall. The outer ring rooms are partitioned vertically into separate households, each household partition has its own set of staircases not shared by other families; some partition has a frontal width of 3 rooms, others has width of 4 rooms. The partition of the inner ring is attached to the partition of the main ring via covered veranda as antechamber.

=== Nanxi Tulou cluster (including Yanxiang Lou) ===
The Nanxi Tulou cluster (南溪土楼群) is the name applied to a section of the Nanxi ("South Creek") Valley in Hukeng Town (Yongding County), which for a distance of several kilometers is almost continuously built up with tulous. For its striking visual effect, the area is referred to by some authors as the "Tulou Great Wall" (土楼长城). One of the tulous in this large cluster, the Yanxiang Lou (衍香楼), a round tulou in Xinnan Village (新南村, 24°36′22″N 116°58′30″E) figures on the World Heritage List as Site 1113-004.

=== Heguilou ===
Heguilou is the largest rectangular tulou. It covers 3,000 square meters with a height of 21.5 meters and 5 stories. It was built on swampland and is the tallest of the rectangular shaped tulous.

== Architecture ==
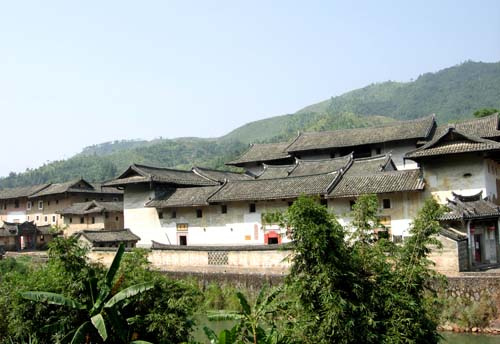
Exterior buildings

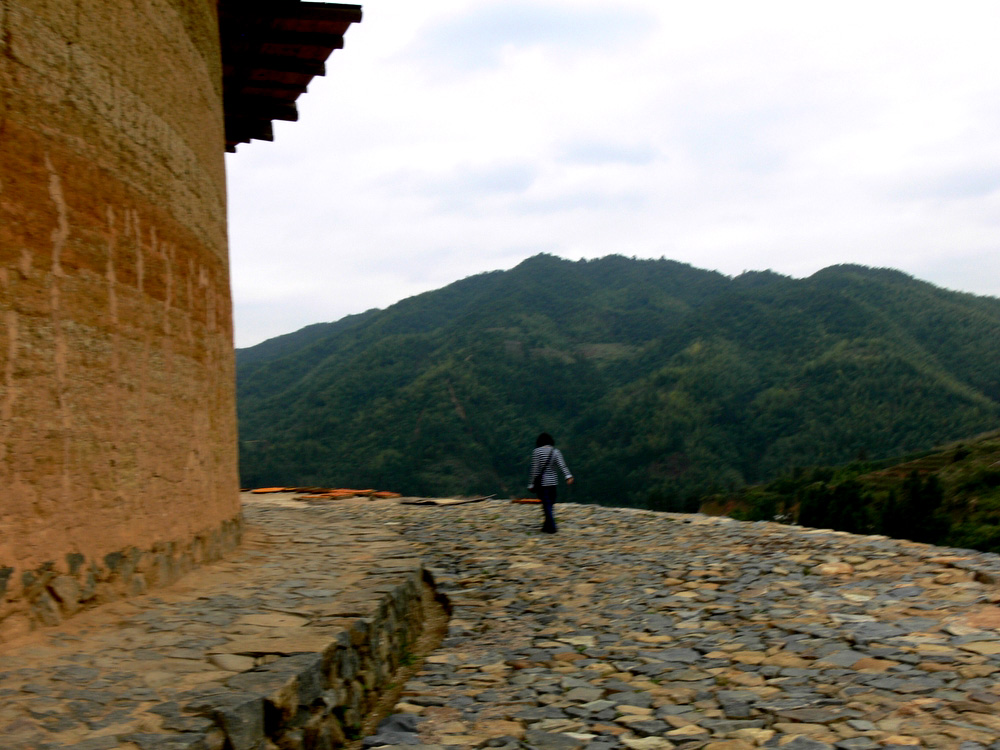
Stone foundation typical tulou

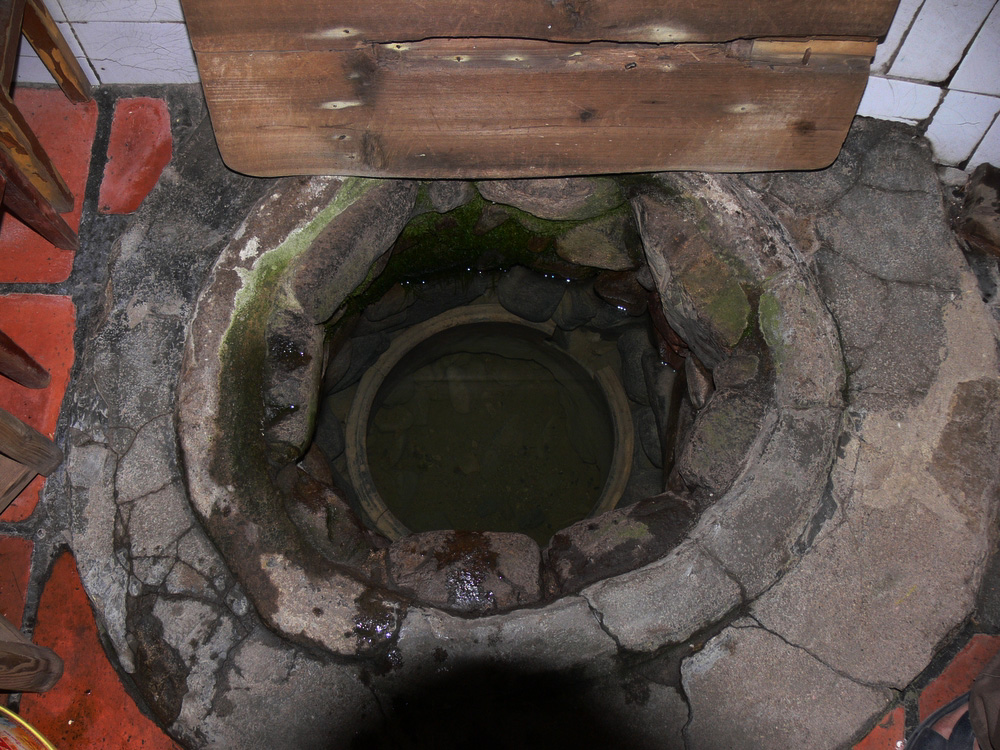
Yuchanglou inhouse water well

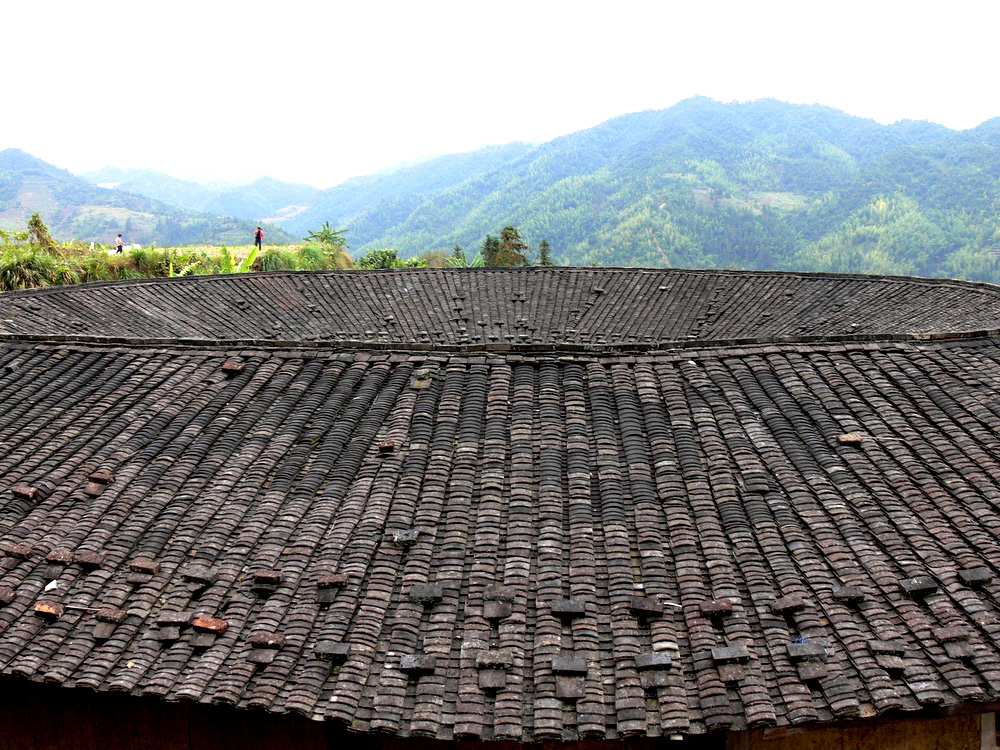
λinsertion technique of roof tiles

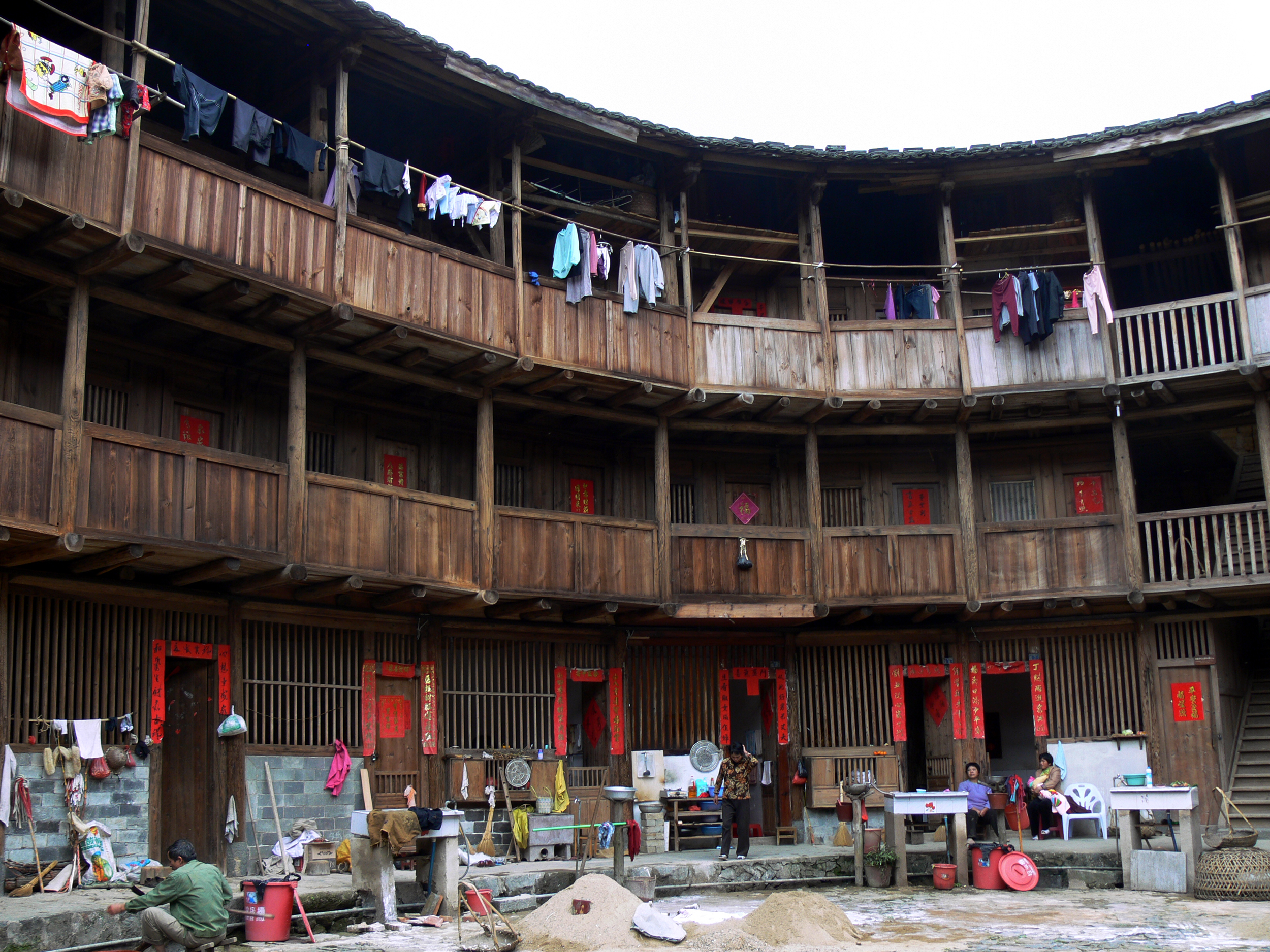
Corridors of tulou

The layout of Fujian tulou followed the Chinese dwelling tradition of "closed outside, open inside" concept: an enclosure wall with living quarters around the peripheral and a common courtyard at the center. A small building at the center with an open front served as an ancestral hall for ancestry worshipping, festivals, meetings, weddings, funerals and other ceremonial functions. The ground floor plan includes shapes such as circles, semicircles, ovals, squares, rectangles, and irregular pentagons.

The foundation of tulou buildings were built with paved stones on top of compacted earth ground, in two to three tiers. There is a circular drain around the top tier foundation to prevent rainwater from damaging the tulou wall.

In most cases, the weight bearing outer wall of tulou consists of two sections, the lower section is built from cut stone blocks or river cobbles held together with a lime, sand and clay mixture to a height of about one or two meters, depending upon the regional flood water level. The compacted earth wall stacked on top of the stone section. The construction of earth wall from compacted earth mixed with sticky rice and reinforced with horizontal bamboo sticks was described first in Song dynasty building standard Yingzao Fashi.

The walls were built inclined toward the center, such that the natural force of gravity pushes the wall together. This inward inclination method was also used in the construction of Pagoda of Fogong Temple. The thickness of the tulou wall decreases with height as specified in Yingzao Fashi. The bottom two stories of tulou are solid with no window nor gun hole, windows are open only from the third to fifth stories, because rooms at the bottom story served as family storage rooms and the upper stories were living quarters.

The rooftops were covered with baked clay tiles, arranged radially;λ insertion technique was used at regular intervals to compensate for larger circumference at the outside. (The majority of roof tiles were laid from top to bottom, the gap caused by radial layout was compensated by small sections of tiles laid in λ-shaped inserts.) This technique allowed the tiles to be laid radially without visible gaps, and without the use of small tiles at top, larger tiles at bottom.

The eaves usually extend about two meters, protecting the earth wall from damage by rainwater pouring from the eaves.

The wooden frame supporting the rooftop had no dougong elements common in traditional Chinese building.

Circular corridors from 2nd to uppermost level were made of wood boards laid on horizontal wooden beams with one end inserted into the earth wall. The corridors are protected with a circle of wooden railings.

Stairwells are distributed evenly around the corridors, four sets of stairwells being the usual number. Each stairwell leads from ground floor to the highest floor.

Public water wells in groups of two or three are usually located at the center court; more luxurious tulous have in-house water well for each household in ground floor kitchen. Most tulous have in built water pipes to offer protection to the upper wooden floors against fire (either accidental or as a result of attack).

=== Largest round Tulou ===
The Chengqi Lou in Yongding county has long been considered to be the largest tulou, with a diameter 62.5 meters. However, Huang Hanmin discovered that the Shunyu Lou (顺裕楼) in Nanjing county is even larger, with a diameter of 74.1 meters. This tulou was built in 1933, it has four layers, with an outer wall that is 15 meters high and 1.6 meters thick, with 64 rooms along its perimeter, one main entrance and two side doors. However, the title of "largest tulou" belongs to Fusheng Lou (福盛楼), built since 1968 and completed in 1981. Its diameter was measured at 77.42 meters. It is located in the Chendong village of Yongding county.

=== Smallest Tulou ===
Cuilin Lou (翠林楼) in the Nankeng township of Nanjing county is the smallest tulou, with a diameter of 14 meters. This three-story tulou was built in 1617.

=== Oldest Tulou ===
The elliptic tulou Qiyun Lou (齐云楼) in Shajian village of Hua An county is the oldest tulou, built in 1371.

== Housing for a community of equals ==
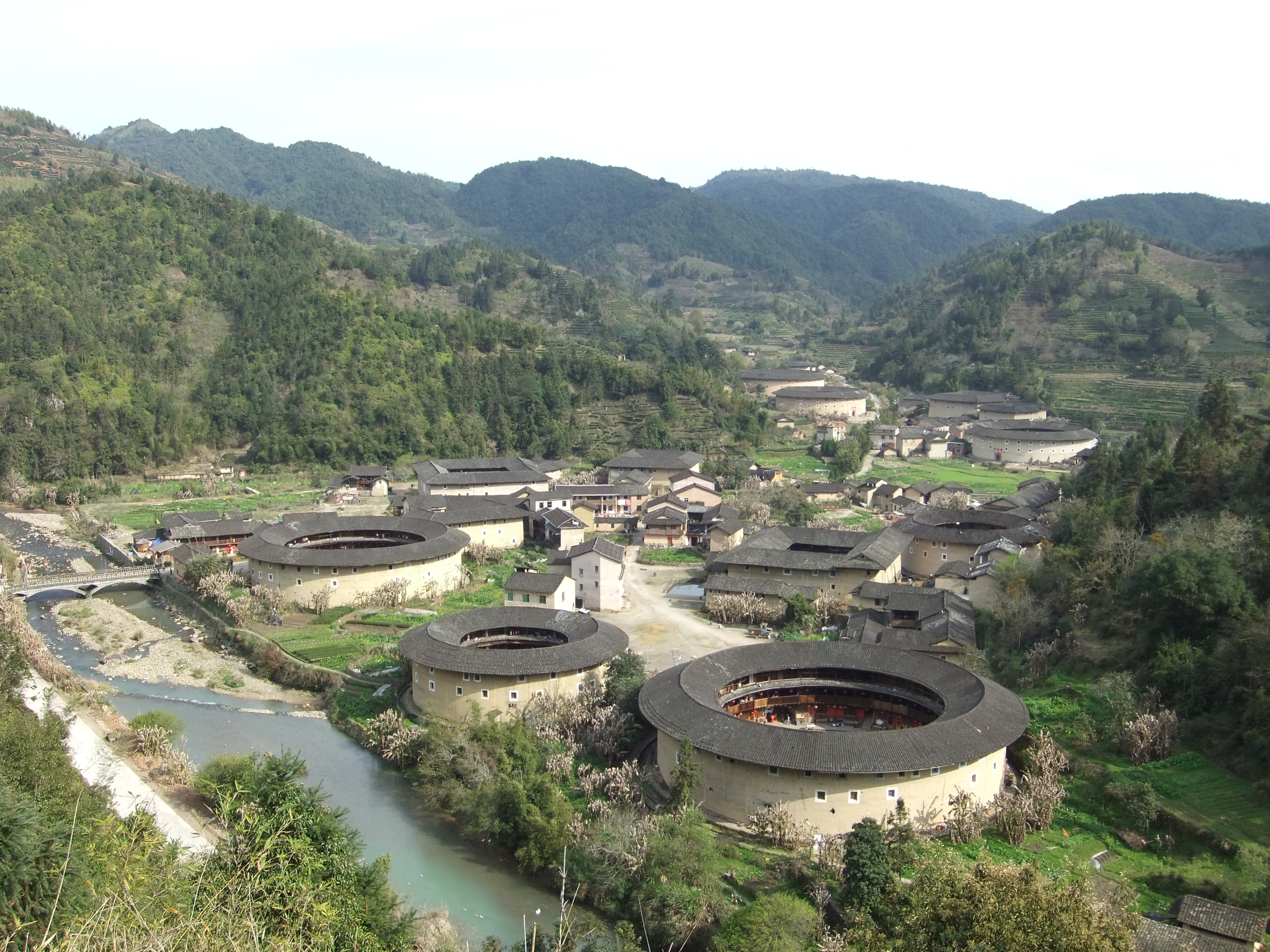
Hekeng tulou cluster (Shuyang Town, Nanjing County)

Unlike other housing structures around the world with architecture illustrating social hierarchy, Fujian Tulou exhibits its unique characteristic as a model of community housing for equals. All rooms were built the same size with the same grade of material, same exterior decoration, same style of windows and doors, and there was no "penthouse" for "higher echelons"; a small family owned a vertical set from ground floor to "penthouse" floor, while a larger family would own two or three vertical sets.

Tulous were usually occupied by one large family clan of several generations; some larger tulou had more than one family clan. Besides the building itself, many facilities such as water wells, ceremonial hall, bathrooms, wash rooms, and weaponry were shared property. Even the surrounding land and farmland, fruit trees etc. were shared. The residents of tulou farmed communally. This continued into the 1960s even during the people's commune period; at that time a tulou was often occupied by one commune production team. Each small family has its own private property, and every family branch enjoys its privacy behind closed doors.

In the old days, the allotment of housing was based on a family's male branch; each son was counted as one branch. Public duties such as organization of festivals, cleaning of public areas, opening and closing of the main gate, etc., were also assigned to a family branch on a rotational basis.

All branches of a family clan shared a single roof, symbolizing unity and protection under a clan. The family houses face the central ancestral hall, symbolizing worship of ancestry and clan solidarity. When a clan grew, the housing expanded radially by either adding another outer concentric ring or building another tulou nearby, forming cluster to ensure a clan stayed together.

With the development of new housing with modern facilities in rural China, many tulou residents have moved out of the structures or relocated to larger towns or cities for better jobs. However, former residents can choose to keep their ancestral tulou apartment homes under padlock for occasional use when returning home for family reunions during festivals.

== Defense ==
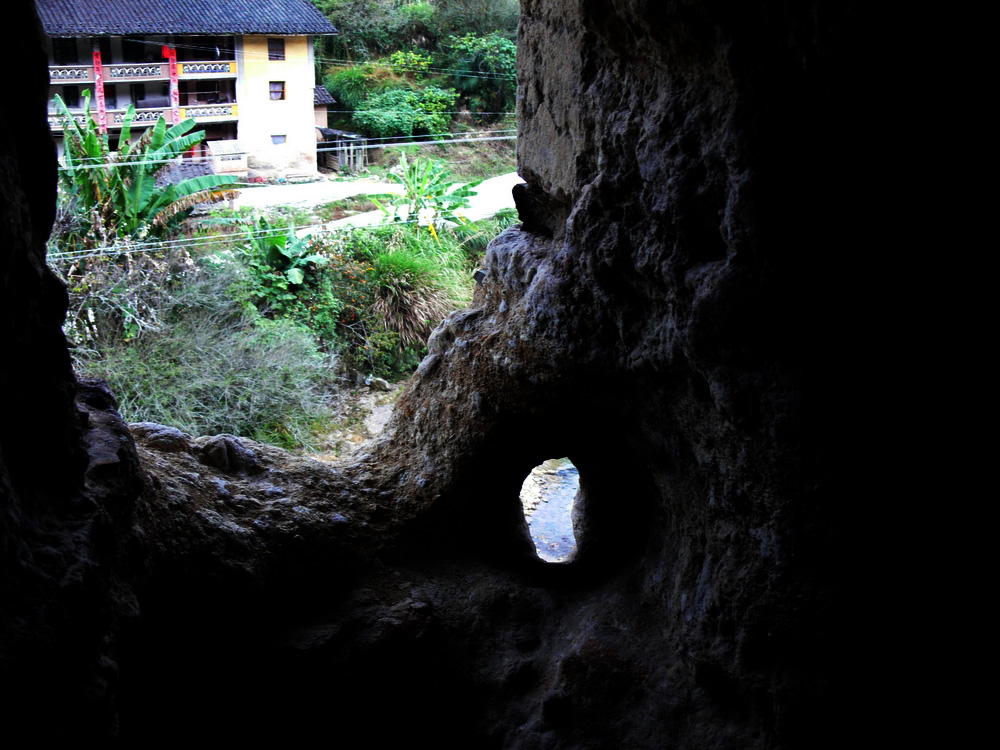
Gun port in the Chengqilou

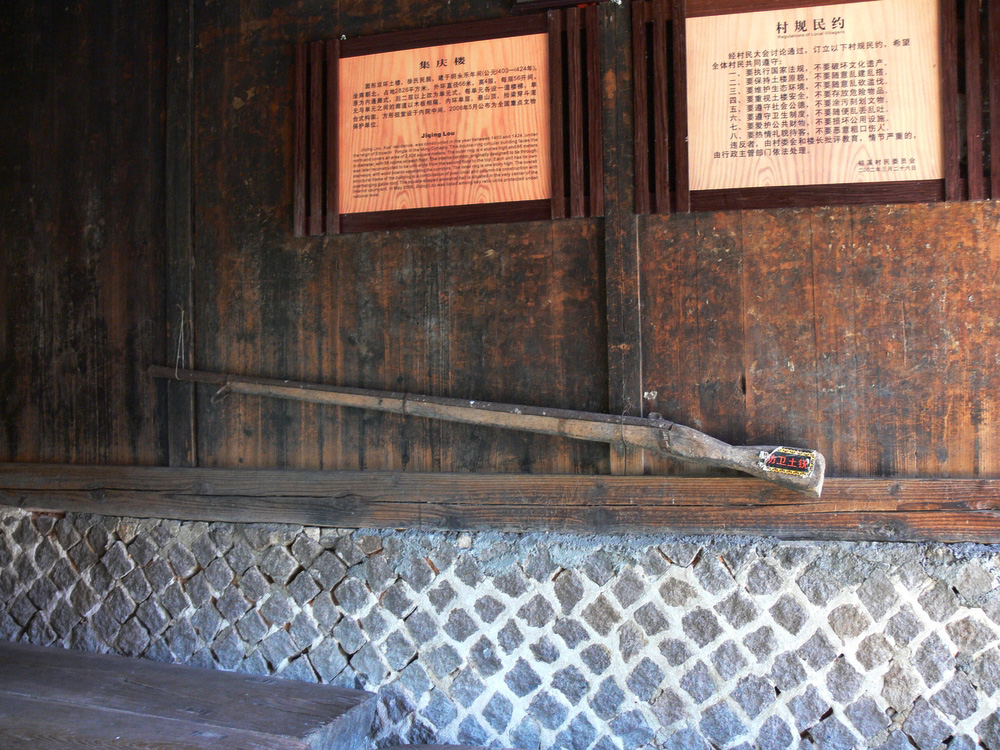
A musket

From the 12th century to 19th century, armed bandits plagued southern China. The people of southern Fujian first built strongholds on top of mountains as self defense. These early strongholds later evolved into Fujian Tulou.

The thick (two meters at the bottom, tapered to one meter on top) outer walls of tulous were immune to arrows and gunfire. The lower one- to two-meter section of the outer wall was sometimes built with granite blocks or large river cobbles. This granite or cobble section was immune to digging, since the outer layer of cobbles was purposely laid with the smaller ends pointing outwards—it would be futile for any attacker to dig out such cobbles. Digging a tunnel under the wall was not possible either, because the cobble section wall was extended deep down more than one meter.

The earth wall section was built with rammed earth together with lime-sand-clay mixture and reinforced with horizontal bamboo strips for lateral binding, rendering it as solid as that of a Western castle's. In 1934, a group of uprising peasants of Yongding County occupied a tulou to resist the assault of the army, which fired 19 cannon shots at that tulou, but made only a small dent on the outside wall.

The weak link in a walled system was usually the gate, but the gate of Fujian tulou was specially designed for defense. The door frame was built from a large solid block of granite; the double doors were built with fire-resistant solid wood boards up to 13 cm thick, reinforced with thick iron armor plates. The main gate door was barred with several horizontal and vertical strong wood posts inserted into holes in the granite. To guard against an enemy destroying the front doors with fire, some doors were equipped with water tanks on top to quench fires set by the enemy.

Fujian Tulou residents used firearms for active defense, shooting at enemies from gun ports at the top level of the building. Some Fujian tulou are constructed with a circular corridor along the inside wall to facilitate the movement of armed men and ammunition.

== Research ==
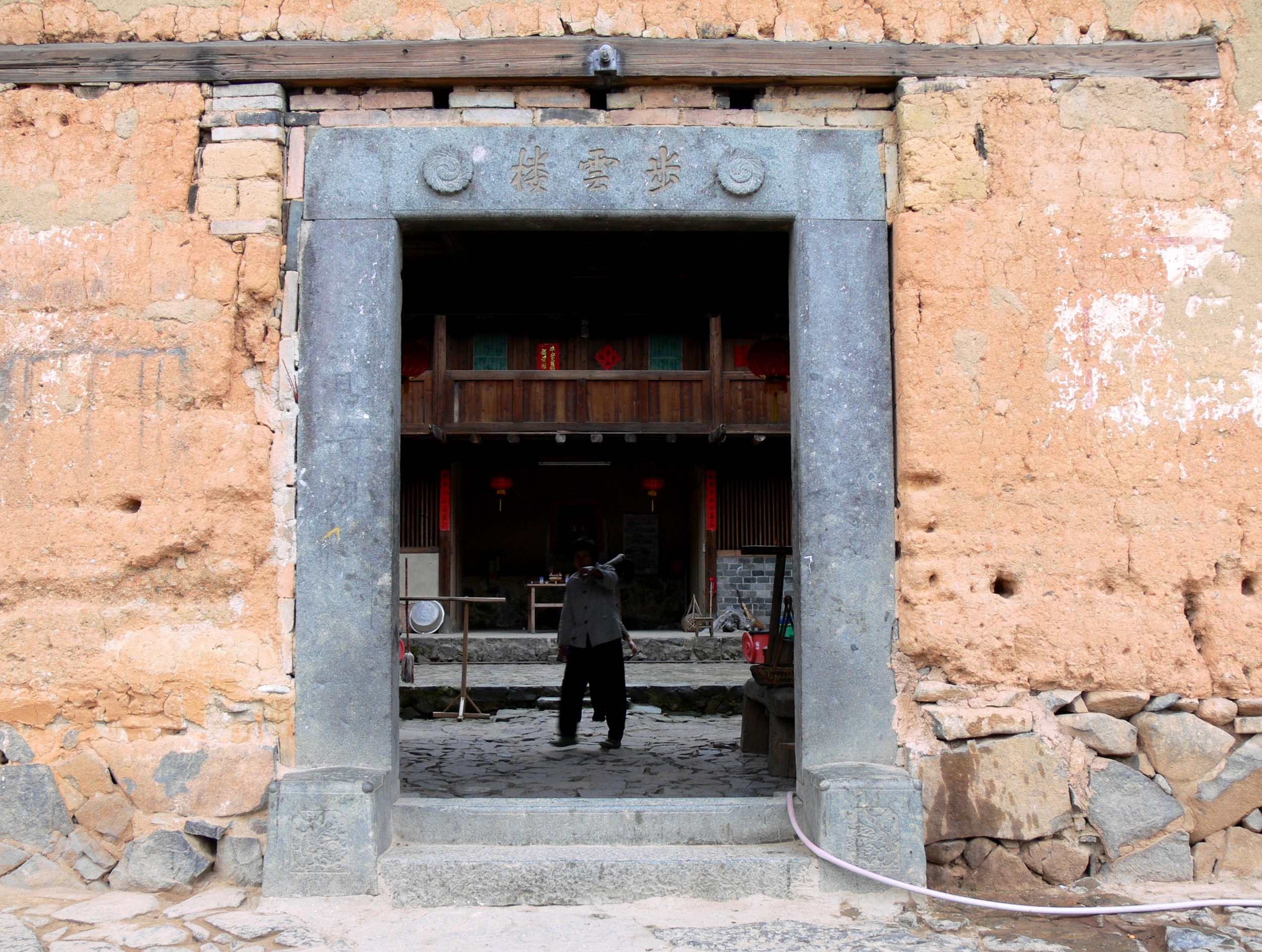
Buyun building main gate

The term "tulou" first appeared in a 1573 Zhangzhou county record of the Ming dynasty; it was on record that due to the growth of bandits, many villagers built walled strongholds and tulous as a means of self defense. Many families banded together in a stronghold, and several strongholds or tulous joined hand in hand with sentinels constantly on guard and lookout; loud drums and gongs were sounded as an alarm signal for any sign of approaching bandits or invaders. Due to the massive solidarity of tulou residents, even large powerful bandit gangs with tens of thousands of men dared not attack the inhabitants of tulou.

The term "tulou" also came out occasionally in some poems; other than that, the existence of tulou bypassed mainstream literature, and was not mentioned in literature published before 1956 dedicated to the study of the people's environment.

In 1956 professor Liu Dun-zhen (刘敦桢), Head of Chinese Dwelling Research was the first scholar to carry out research on Fujian Tulou, his book History of Ancient Chinese Architecture 《中国古代建筑史》published in 1964 described Chengqi Lou and Yihuai Lou (艺槐楼).

In April 1957, the article Dwellings of the Hakka in Yongding County of Fujian Province (福建永定客家住宅) by Zhang Buqian (张步骞), Zhu Mingquan (朱鸣泉) and Hu Zhanlie (胡占烈) published in the Journal of Nanjing Institute of Technology.

In 1980 Chengqi tulou appeared in a book titled History of Ancient Chinese Architecture. From then on, streams of scholars from mainland China, Taiwan, Japan, Europe and America came to Fujian Zhangzhou and Yongding to explore and study tulou; tulou has walked out from seclusion into the world stage. In particular Chinese scholar Huang Hanmin (now the head of Fujian Architecture Design Institute) has spent more than twenty years on research of Fujian Tulou; his master's degree thesis The Tradition Characteristics and Regional Style of Fujian Civilian Residence was completed in 1982 and published on the Chinese magazine Architect. Japanese scholar published a report Study on Chinese Civilian Housing—The Square Tulou and Round Tulou followed by photo exhibition in Japan and a book in 1989. In 1997, Dutch architect Herman Hertzberger inspected Fujian Tulou, and in 1999 Dr. Neville Agnew of the Getty Conservation Institute inspected Tianluokeng, Yuchanglou and Heguilou.

The book Fujian Tulou by Huang Hanmin published in Taiwan in 1994, revised and republished in China in 2003 is at present one of the more authentic studies on Fujian Tulou, covering the history of tulou, its characteristics and style, its geographic distribution, folklore about tulou etc., with hundreds of color plates and drawing. English literature on this topic is still absent.

== Transportation ==
The Fujian tulou buildings are scattered in the mountainous southeastern region of Fujian province.

The tulous in Nanjing County are connected to the county seat, Shancheng Town (the place labeled as "Nanjing County" on many maps), by winding mountain roads; the main road of the area, County Route 562 (X562) has been recently upgraded. Shancheng Town can be easily reached from the Zhanglong highway that connects Zhangzhou City with Longyan City. The Zhanglong highway is connecting the region to the rest of the Chinese network of highways. It takes approximately 2 hours by car from Xiamen to Shancheng Town.

There are commuter buses from Xiamen and Fuzhou to Longyan or Zhangzhou, about 4 hours drive each way.

There are no railways in the heart of the "tulou country" (western Nanjing County, eastern Yongding County, and western Pinghe County). The closest railway station to the most of Yongding County tulou sites is the Yongding Station, which, however, has only very limited passenger service (the daily Xiamen-Guangzhou train).

Since the opening of the high-speed Longyan–Xiamen Railway (June 2012), travelers are able to reach Longyan from Xiamen in 45 minutes; there is direct service from Fuzhou and Shanghai as well. The line includes an intermediate station (Nanjing), serving the eastern Nanjing County; however, it is not particularly close to the tulou sites. To celebrate the tulou heritage of the county, the architects designed the new station building at Nanjing in the shape of three round tulous.

== In popular culture ==
The term "Digimon Tulou building" refers to a specific structure featured in the Digimon Adventure anime series. Specifically, it is the building where the characters Mat (Yamato) and Takeru train with Piximon in episode 18, and is visually inspired by the traditional Fujian Tulou. These are unique, fortified, communal living structures found in Fujian, China.

The Fujian tulou appear in the manga Seraphim 266613336Wings.

The titular character of the 2020 live action film Mulan comes from a Fujian tulou.

== See also ==
- Villages with fortified churches in Transylvania, Romania – UNESCO heritage cluster of fortified churches whose fortified walls also function as communal living
- Circulades, circular villages in southern France
- Hakka walled village
