= Chuxi Tulou cluster =

Group of earthen structures during the Ming dynasty

Coordinates: 24.548899°N 116.902028°E

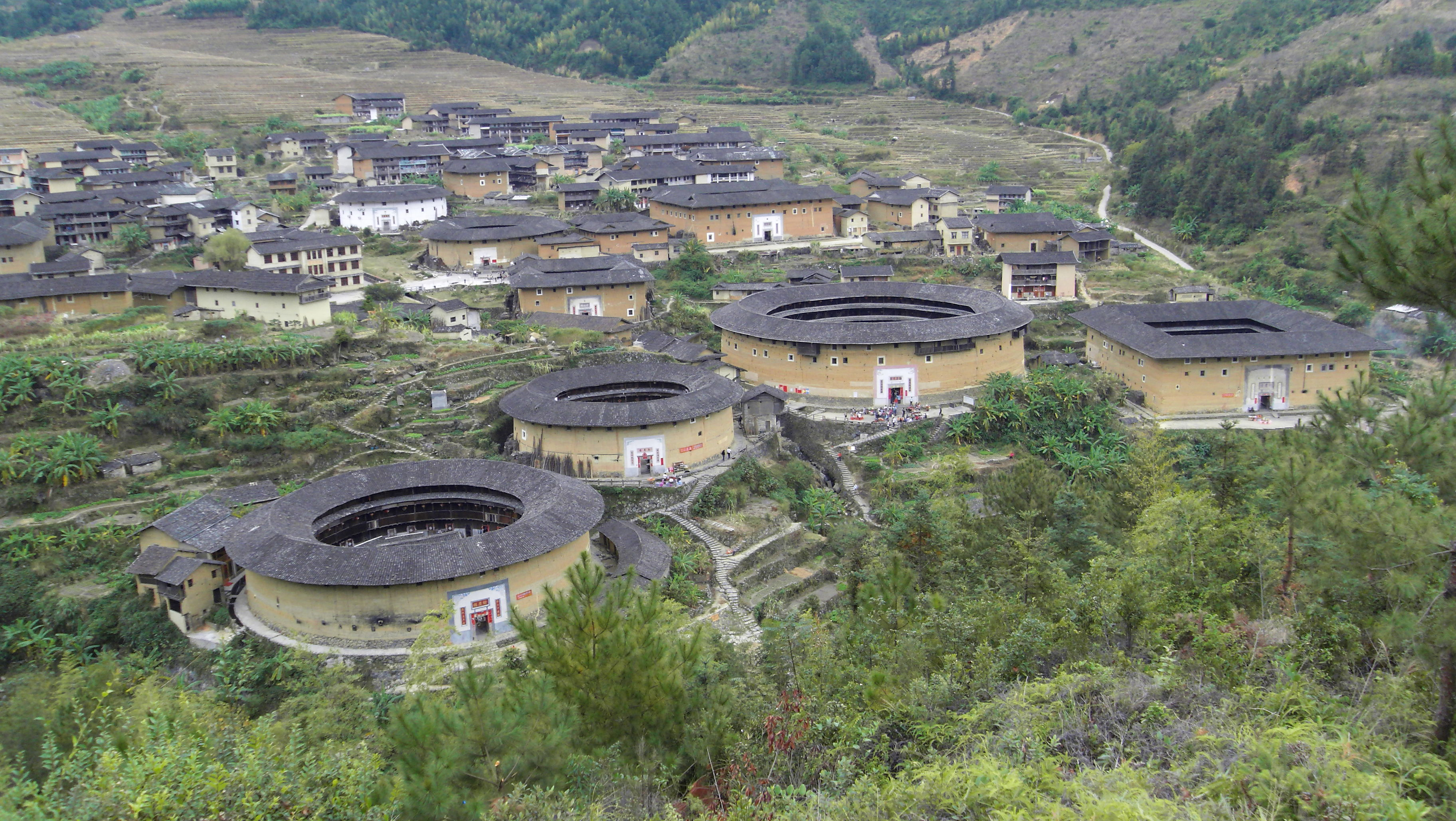
Chuxi tulou group

The Chuxi Tulou cluster (Chinese: 初溪土楼群; pinyin: Chūxī tǔlóu qún) is a group of earthen structures or "tulou" dating to the Ming dynasty (1368–1644). The group provides a tourist attraction in the town of Xiayang (下洋镇), Yongding County, Longyan, Fujian Province, China.

== History ==
Chuxi Tulou cluster is a Hakka village inhabited by Xu (徐) clan, who settled down in the 14th century. The first tulou was Heqing Lou (simplified Chinese: 和庆楼; traditional Chinese: 和慶樓), which was the ancestry tulou of the village. After that, all tulous built in the village were named with a Chinese character qing (simplified Chinese: 庆; traditional Chinese: 慶), with a wish of having a flourishing population. Chuxi tulou group was designated as UNESCO World Heritage site as part of Fujian Tulou in 2008.

== Structures ==
A total of 36 tulous are conserved in Chuxi village. The largest and also the oldest in the cluster is Jiqing Lou (simplified Chinese: 集庆楼; traditional Chinese: 集慶樓), built in 1419 during the reign of the Yongle Emperor of the Ming dynasty. It consists of two concentric rings, the outer ring building is four stories tall, with 53 rooms on each level. The outer ring contains 72 stairs split into 72 units interfacing each other. The second ring is a one-story building.

=== Famous tulou ===
Ten tulous were listed in the UNESCO World Heritage site.

Name	Image	Year	Area [m^{2}]	Shape	Description
Jiqing Lou (simplified Chinese: 集庆楼; traditional Chinese: 集慶樓)		1419	2826	Circular	
Shengqing Lou (simplified Chinese: 绳庆楼; traditional Chinese: 繩慶樓)		1799	1482	Rectangula	
Yuqing Lou (simplified Chinese: 余庆楼; traditional Chinese: 餘慶樓)		1729	1256	Circular	
Huaqing Lou (simplified Chinese: 华庆楼; traditional Chinese: 華慶樓)		1829	480	Rectangula	
Gengqing Lou (simplified Chinese: 庚庆楼; traditional Chinese: 庚慶樓)		1840	660	Circular	
Fuqing Lou (simplified Chinese: 福庆楼; traditional Chinese: 福慶樓)		1849	660	Oval	
Xiqing Lou (simplified Chinese: 锡庆楼; traditional Chinese: 錫慶樓)		1849	400	Rectangula	
Fanqing Lou (simplified Chinese: 藩庆楼; traditional Chinese: 藩慶樓)		1949		Rectangula	
Gongqing Lou (simplified Chinese: 共庆楼; traditional Chinese: 共慶樓)		1949	3500	Hexagonal	
Shanqing Lou (simplified Chinese: 善庆楼; traditional Chinese: 善慶樓)		1979	1200	Circular	

== Trivia ==
The CIA once believed that Chuxi Tulou were missile bases due to their size and shape in the 1960s.

== Gallery ==
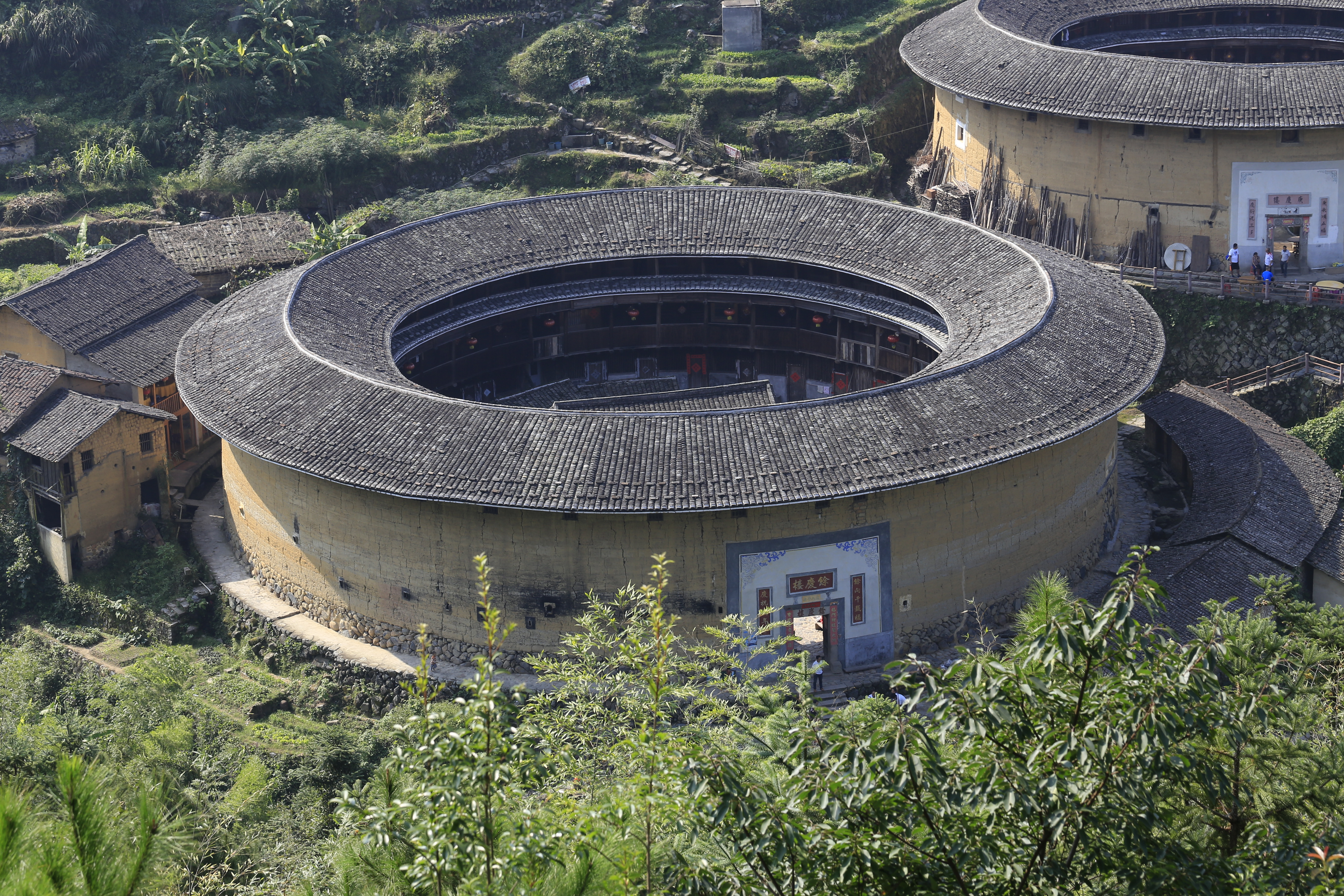
Yuqing House

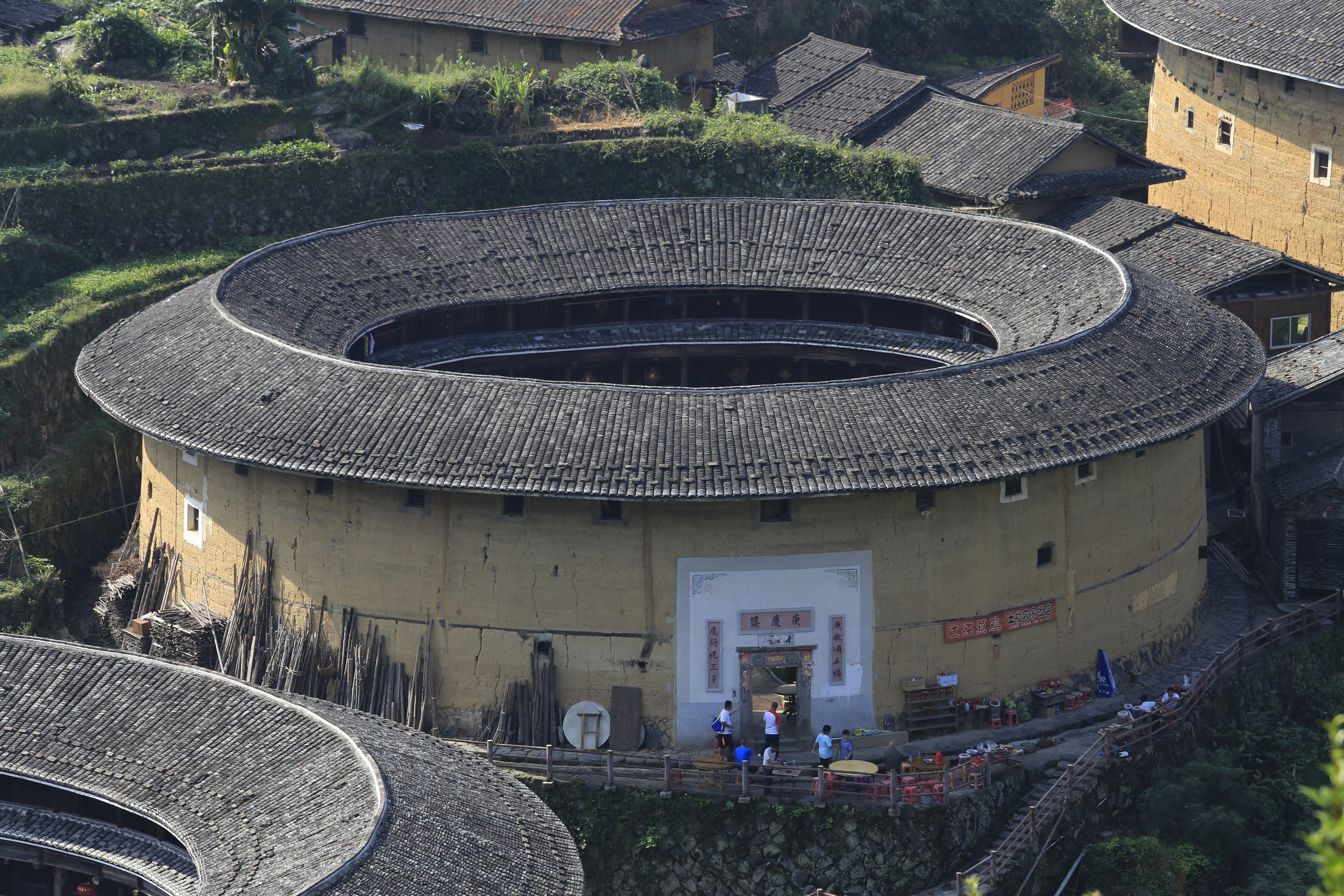
Gengqing House

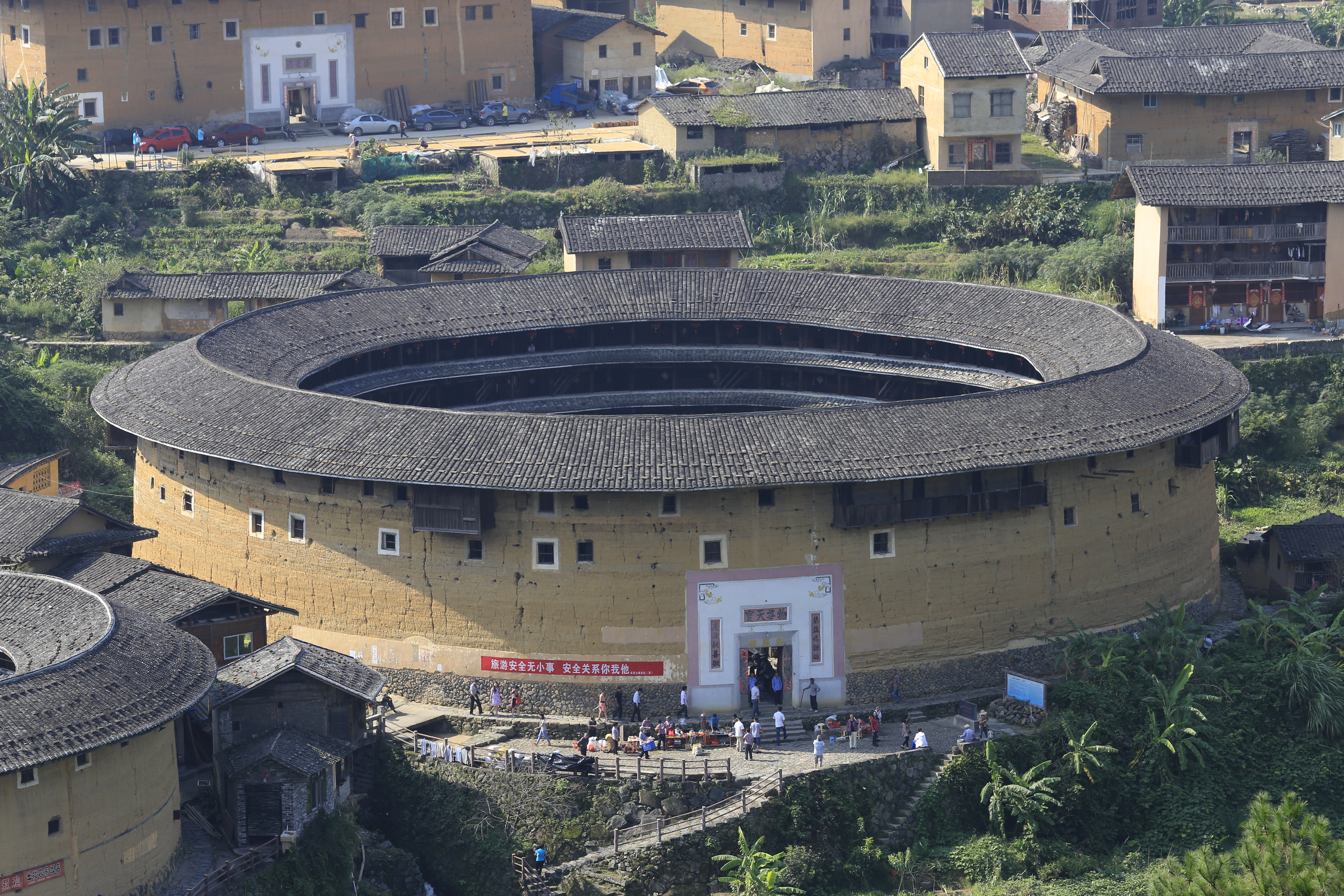
Jiqing House

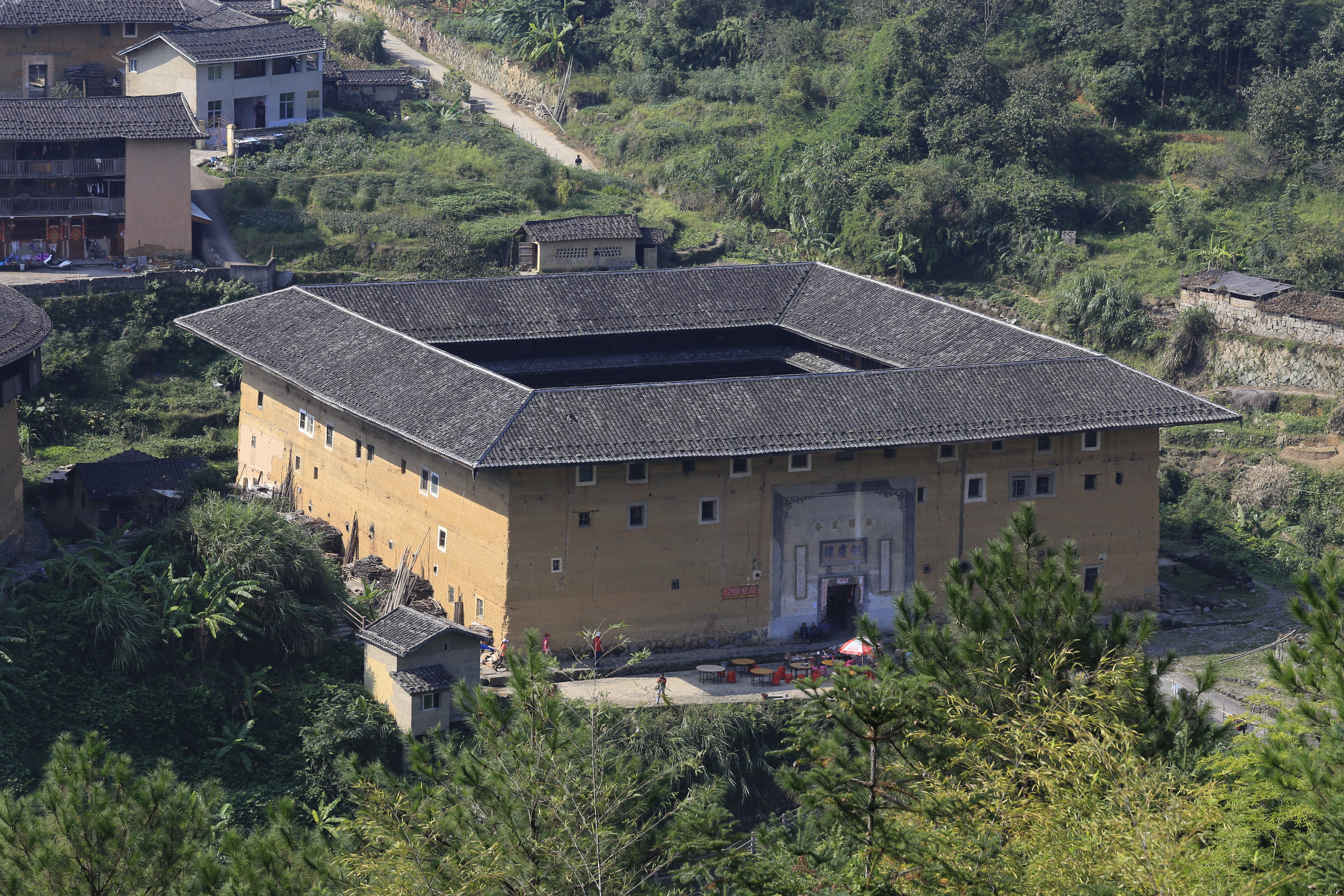
Shengqing House

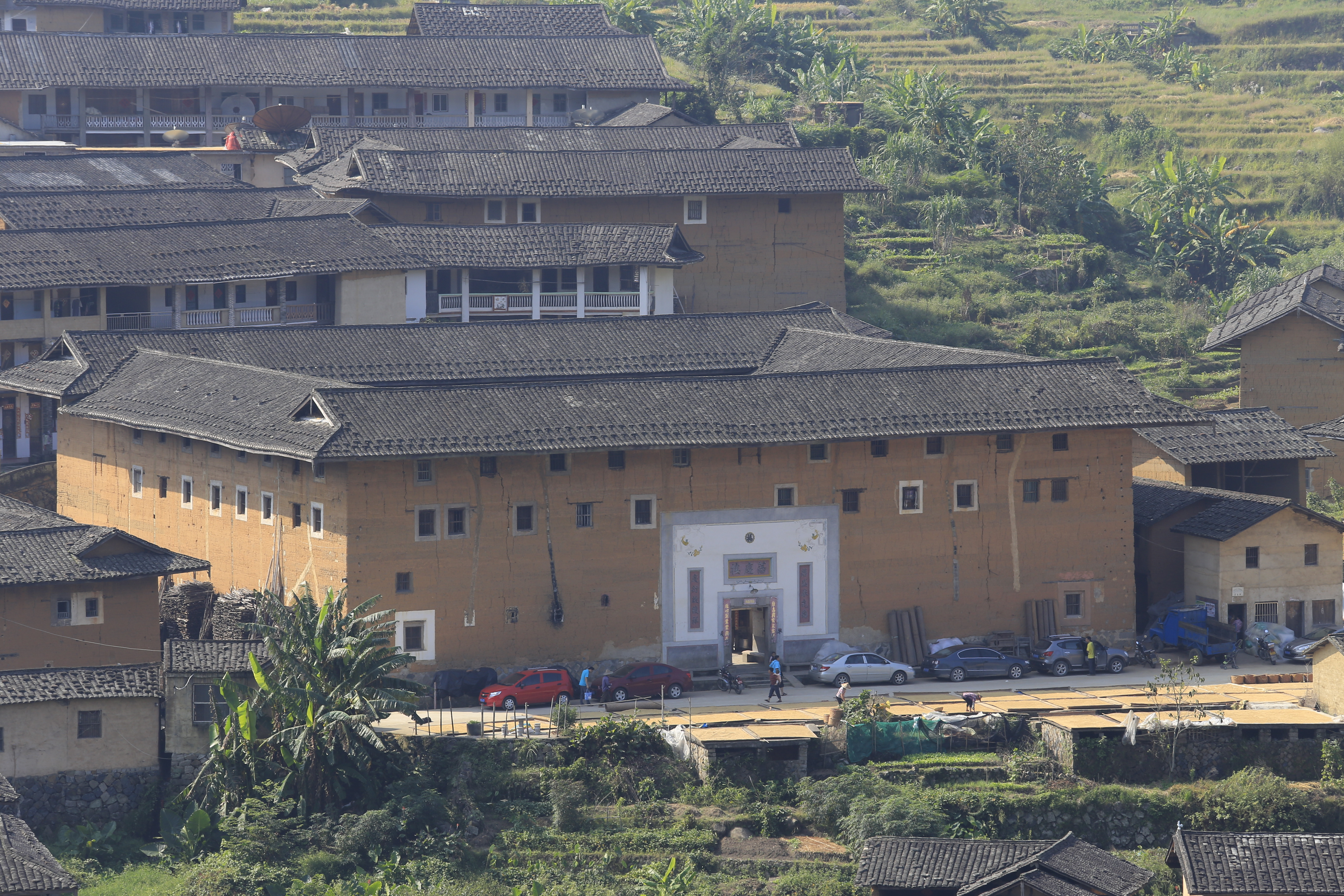
Fanqing House

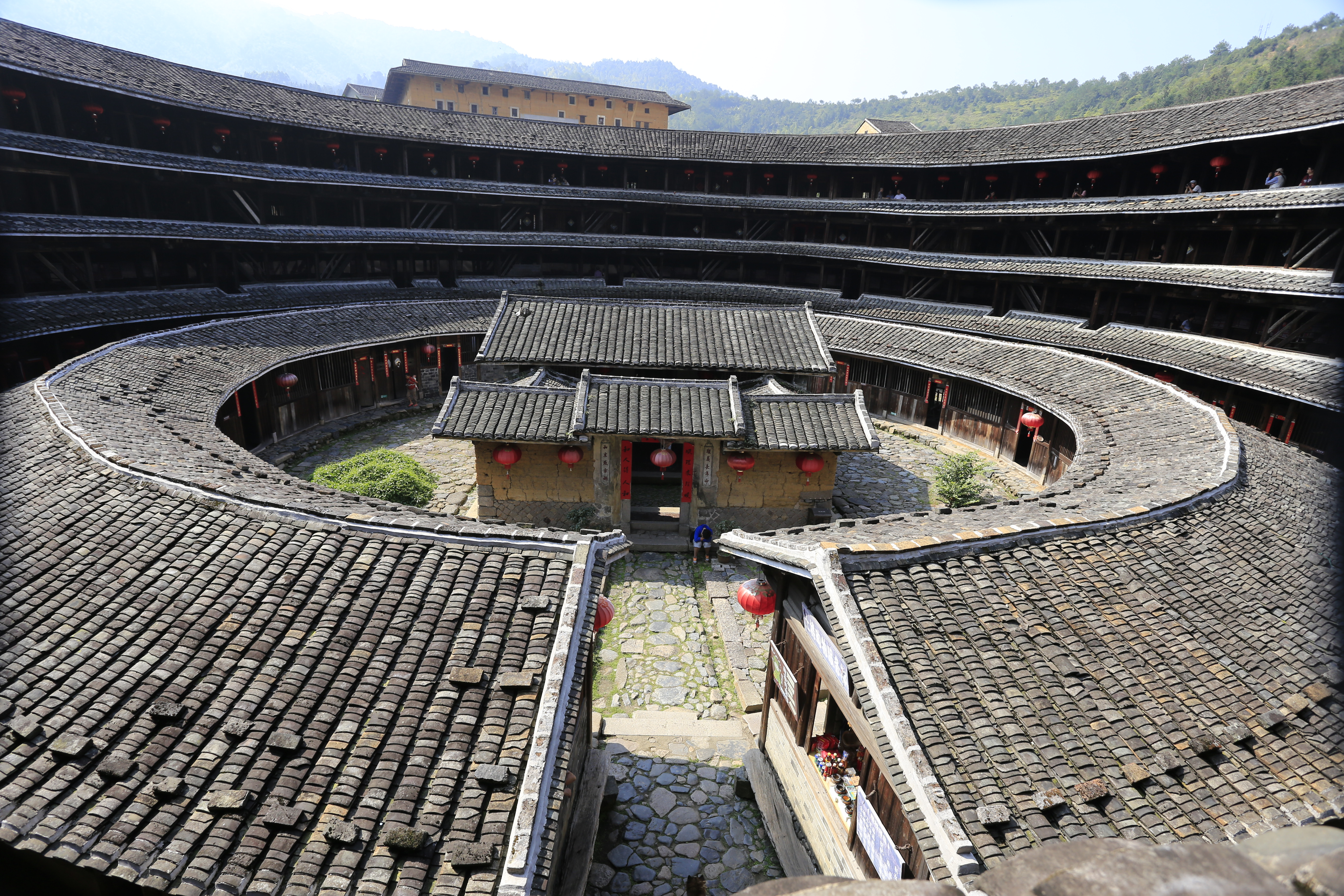
Internal Jiqing House

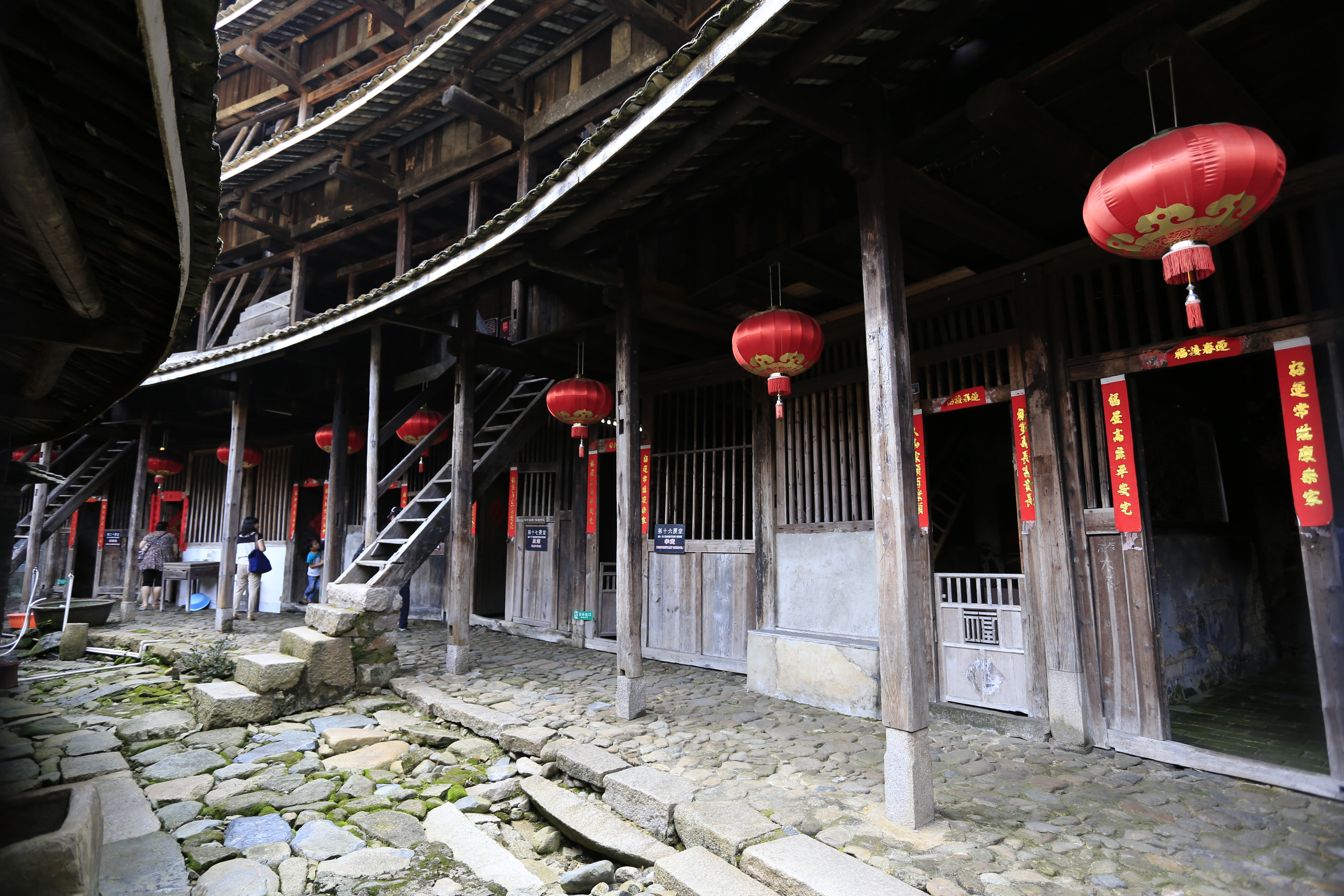
Internal Jiqing House

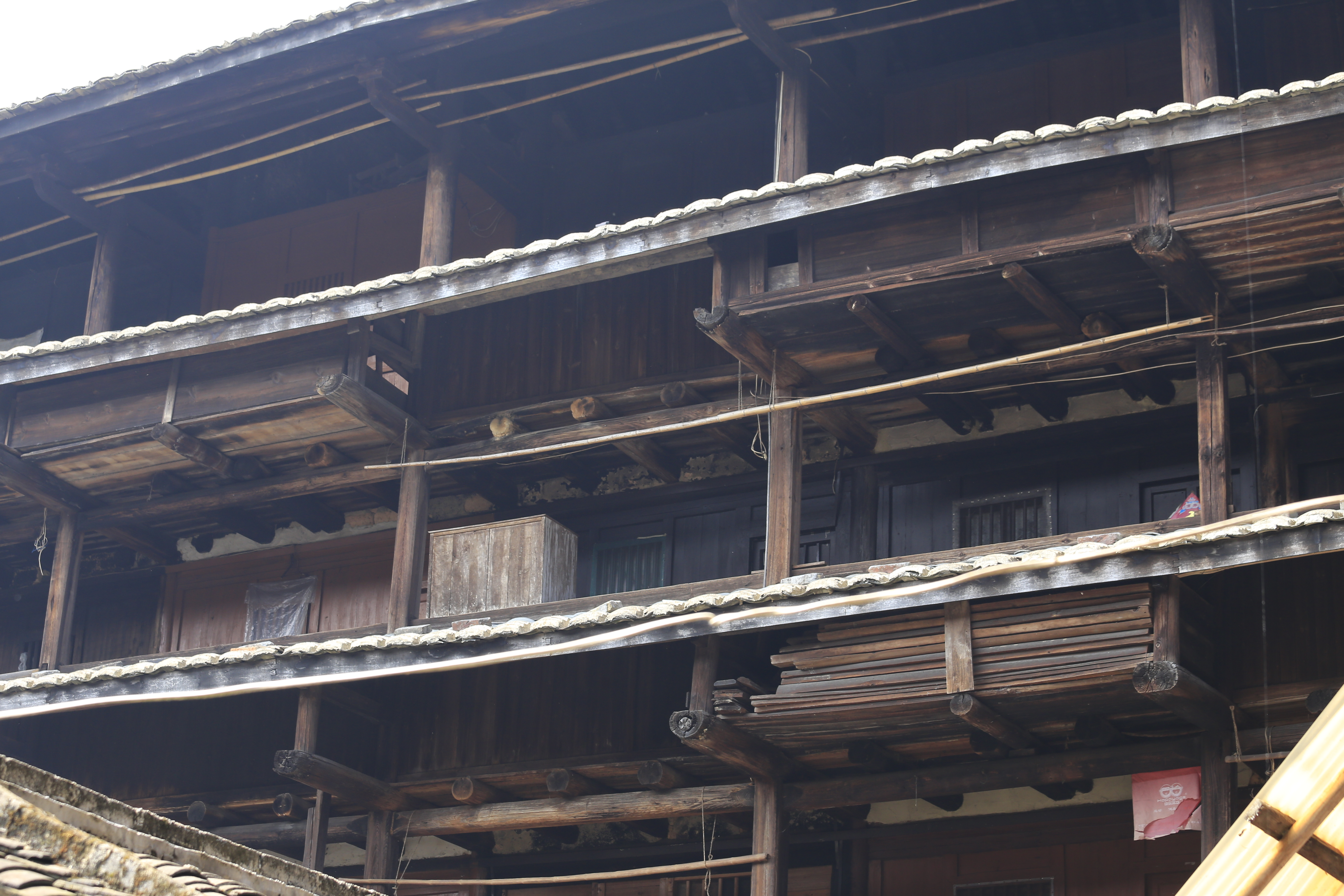
Internal Shenqing house
