= List of railway lines in China =

The following is a list of conventional lines of rail transport in China. For the high-speed network, see List of high-speed railway lines in China.

== North–south direction ==
The map of the railway network of China as of November 2023.

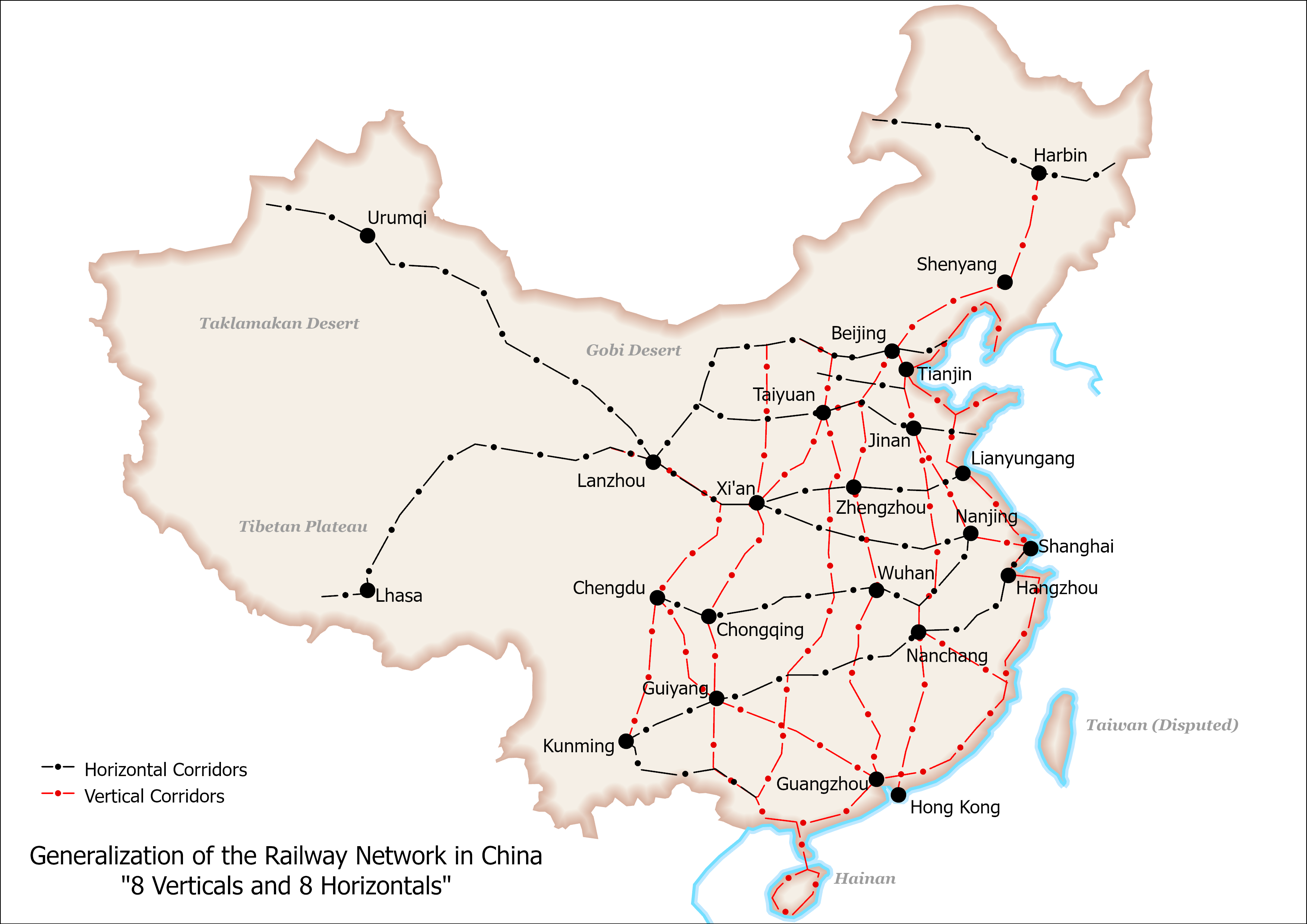
The 8 horizontal and 8 vertical mainlines of Chinese railway

=== Beijing–Harbin Corridor ===
- Jingqin railway; Beijing–Qinhuangdao 京秦线
- Jingshan railway; Beijing–Shanhaiguan 京山线
- Shenshan railway; Shenyang–Shanhaiguan 沈山线
- Qinshen Passenger railway; Qinhuangdao–Shenyang 秦沈客运专线
- Changda railway; Changchun–Dalian 长大线
- Changbin railway; Changchun–Harbin 长滨线
- Binzhou railway; Harbin–Manzhouli 滨洲线

In passenger rail service, Jingshan railway, Shenshan railway, Changda railway, Changchun–Shenyang portion and Changbin railway are collectively called Jingha railway (Beijing–Harbin).

=== East Coast ===
- Changda railway; Changchun–Dalian 长大线, Shenyang–Dalian Portion (沈大段)
- Yanda railway Ferry 烟大铁路轮渡
- Lanyan railway; Lancun–Yantai 蓝烟线
- Jiaoxin railway; Jiaozhou–Xinyi 胶新线
- Xinyi–Changxing railway; Xinyi–Changxing 新长线
- Xuancheng–Hangzhou railway Xuancheng–Hangzhou宣杭线, Hangzhou–Changxing Portion (杭长段)
- Xiaoshan–Ningbo railway; Xiaoshan–Ningbo 萧甬线
- Ningbo–Taizhou–Wenzhou railway; Ningbo–Wenzhou 甬台温铁路
- Wenzhou–Fuzhou railway; Wenzhou–Fuzhou 温福铁路
- Fuzhou–Xiamen railway; Fuzhou–Xiamen 福厦铁路
- Yingtan–Xiamen railway; Yingtan–Xiamen 鹰厦线, Zhangping–Xiamen Portion (漳厦段)

=== Beijing–Shanghai Corridor ===
- Jingshan railway; Beijing–Shanhaiguan 京山线, Beijing–Tianjin Portion (京津段)
- Jingpu railway; Tianjin–Pukou 津浦线
- Huning railway; Shanghai–Nanjing 沪宁线

Jingshan railway Beijing–Tianjin portion, Jingpu railway and Huning railway are collectively called Jinghu railway(京沪线) in passenger rail service.

=== Beijing–Kowloon Corridor ===
- Jingjiu railway 京九线 / 京九鐵路; Beijing–Shenzhen (and onward into Kowloon, Hong Kong)
- Guangshen railway; Guangzhou–Shenzhen 广深铁路

Jingjiu railway uses the same line as Guangmeishan railway between Longchuan and Dongguan. It also uses the same line as Guangshen railway between Dongguan and Shenzhen. It then crosses the border and follows the East Rail line to Kowloon, Hong Kong.

=== Beijing–Guangzhou Corridor ===
- Jingguang railway; Beijing–Guangzhou 京广线

=== Datong–Zhanjiang Corridor ===
- Beitongpu railway; Datong–Fenglingdu 北同蒲线
- Taijiao railway; Taiyuan–Jiaozuo 太焦线
- Jiaoliu railway; Jiaozuo–Liuzhou 焦柳线
- Shichang railway; Shimenxian–Changsha 石长线
- Xianggui railway; Hengyang–Pingxiang 湘桂线
- Yuehai railway; Guangdong–Haikou粤海铁路

=== Baotou–Liuzhou Corridor ===
- Shenmu–Yan'an railway神延铁路
- Xi'an–Yan'an railway 西延铁路
- Xi'an–Ankang railway 西康铁路

=== Baoji–Kunming Corridor ===
- Baocheng railway; Baoji–Chengdu 宝成铁路
- Chengdu–Kunming railway; Chengdu–Kunming 成昆铁路

== East–west direction ==
=== Beijing–Lhasa ===
- Fengtai–Shacheng railway; Fengtai–Shacheng 丰沙铁路
- Beijing–Baotou railway; Beijing–Baotou 京包铁路
- Baotou–Lanzhou railway; Baotou–Lanzhou 包兰铁路
- Lanzhou–Qinghai railway; Lanzhou–Xining 兰青铁路
- Qinghai–Tibet railway; Xining–Lhasa 青藏铁路

=== Eurasian Land Bridge ===
- Longhai railway; Lianyungang–Lanzhou 陇海铁路
- Lanzhou–Xinjiang railway; Lanzhou–Xinjiang 兰新铁路
- Northern Xinjiang railway; Ürümqi–Alashankou (Alataw Pass)北疆铁路
- The Second Ürümqi–Jinghe railway (乌精二线)
- Nanjing–Xi'an railway; Nanjing–Xi'an 宁西铁路

=== Yangtze River Valley ===
- Nanjing–Qidong railway 宁启铁路
- Nanjing–Tongling railway 宁铜铁路 (including Nanjing–Wuhu railway 宁芜铁路)
- Tongling–Jiujiang railway 铜九铁路
- Wuhan–Jiujiang railway 武九铁路
- Wuhan–Yichang railway 汉宜铁路
- Yichang–Wanzhou railway 宜万铁路

=== Shanghai–Kunming railway (Hukun Line) ===
- Shanghai–Hangzhou railway; Shanghai–Hangzhou 沪杭铁路
- Zhegan railway; Hangzhou–Zhuzhou 浙赣铁路
- Xiangqian railway; Zhuzhou–Guiyang 湘黔铁路
- Shanghai–Kunming railway; Guiyang–Kunming 贵昆铁路

=== South Coast ===
- Xiamen–Shenzhen railway Xiamen–Shenzhen 厦深铁路
- Guangzhou–Meizhou–Shantou railway; Guangzhou–Meizhou–Shantou 广梅汕线
- Guangzhou–Sanshui railway; Guangzhou–Sanshui 广三线
- Guangzhou–Maoming railway; Sanshui–Longhua 三茂线
- Hechun–Maoming railway; Hechun–Maoming 河茂线
- Litang–Zhanjiang railway; Litang–Zhanjiang 黎湛线
- Hainan eastern ring high-speed railway
- Yuehai railway; Zhanjiang–Haikou 粤海铁路
- Guangdong–Hainan railway, Guangzhou–Haikou (includes the Guangdong–Hainan Ferry)

== Other inter-regional railways ==
- Xinjiang–Tibet railway (proposed)
- Huanghua–Dajiawa railway 黄大铁路 (freight only)

== Regional railways ==
=== North ===
- Beijing–Zhangjiakou railway; Beijing–Zhangjiakou 京张线
- Beijing–Chengde railway; Beijing–Chengde 京承线
- Chengde–Longhua railway; Chengde–Longhua 承隆线
- Yeboshou–Chifeng railway; Yeboshou–Chifeng 叶赤线
- Ningwu–Kelan railway 宁岢铁路
- Handan–Changzhi railway 邯长铁路
- Handan–Jinan railway 邯济铁路
- Xinxiang–Yanzhou railway 新兖铁路
- Yanzhou–Shijiusuo railway 兖石铁路
- Zibo–Dongying railway 淄东铁路
- Dongdu–Pingyi railway 东平铁路
- Ciyao–Laiwu railway 磁莱铁路
- Xindian–Taian railway 辛泰铁路
- Yangpingguan–Ankang railway 阳安铁路
- Yangquan–Dazhai railway 阳大铁路
- Tianjin–Jizhou railway 津蓟铁路
- Tangshan–Caofeidian railway
- Jiexiu–Yangquanqu railway

=== Northeast ===
- Beijing–Tongliao railway; Beijing–Tongliao 京通铁路
- Jinzhou–Chengde railway; Jinzhou–Chengde 锦承线
- Weizhangzi–Tashan railway; Weizhangzi–Tashan 魏塔线
- Jining–Tongliao railway; Jining–Tongliao 集通线
- Jinzhou–Nanpiao railway; Jinzhou–Nanpiao 南票线
- Xinlitun–Yixian railway; Xinlitun–Yixian 新义线
- Gaotaishan–Xinlitun railway; Gaotaishan–Xinlitun 高新线
- Goubangzi–Tangwangshan railway;Goubangzi–Tangwangshan 沟海线
- Yingkou–Dashiqiao railway; Yingkou–Dashiqiao 营口线
- Zhoushuizi–Lushun railway; Zhoushuizi–Lushun旅顺线
- Jinzhou–Chengzidan railway; Jinzhou–Chengzidan 金城线
- Chengzidan–Zhuanghe railway; Chengzidan–Zhuanghe 城庄线
- Qiqihar–Bei'an railway; Qiqihar–Bei'an 齐北铁路
- Fuyu–Nenjiang railway; Fuyu–Nenjiang 富嫩铁路
- Nenjiang–Greater Khingan Forest railway; Nenjiang–Greater Khingan Forest District 嫩林铁路
- Tongliao–Ranghulu railway; Tongliao–Daqing 通让铁路
- Baiyinhua–Xinqiu railway 巴新铁路 (freight only)
- Xiangyangchuan–Hayudao railway 向阳川－哈鱼岛铁路

=== East and Southeast ===
- Anhui–Jiangxi railway Wuhu–Guixi 皖赣铁路
- Hengfeng–Nanping railway Hengfeng–Nanping 横南铁路
- Nanping–Fuzhou railway Nanping (Waiyang Station)–Fuzhou 外福铁路
- Zhangping–Quanzhou–Xiaocuo railway Zhangping–Quanzhou 漳泉肖铁路
- Xiangtang–Putian railway Nanchang–Fuzhou, Putian 向莆铁路
- Zhangping–Longyan railway; Zhangping–Longyan 漳龙铁路
- Meikan railway; Meizhou–Kanshi 梅坎铁路
- Longyan–Xiamen railway Longyan–Xiamen 龙厦铁路
- Ganzhou–Longyan railway Ganzhou–Longyan 赣厦铁路
- Jinhua–Wenzhou railway Jinhua–Wenzhou 金温铁路
- Ganzhou–Shaoguan railway Ganzhou–Shaoguan 赣韶铁路
- Quzhou–Ningde railway
- Dezhou–Dajiawa railway Dezhou–Weifang 德大铁路 (freight only east of Dongying)
- Dongying Port railway 东营港疏港铁路 (freight only)
- Longkou–Yantai railway
- Xiangtangxi–Le'an railway (freight only, partially abandoned)
- Xingguo–Quanzhou railway (under construction)
- Binhai Port railway (under construction)
- Jinhua–Taizhou railway (under construction)

=== South Central ===
- Jingmen–Shashi railway 荆沙铁路
- Hankou–Danjiangkou railway 汉丹铁路
- Huaihua–Shaoyang–Hengyang railway 怀邵衡铁路
- Huizhou Port railway 惠州港铁路 (freight only)
- Nansha Port railway 南沙港铁路

=== Southwest ===
- Xiangyang–Chongqing railway; Xiangyang–Chongqing 襄渝铁路
- Dazhou–Chengdu railway 达成铁路; Chengdu–Dazhou
- Chengdu–Chongqing (Chengyu) railway; Chengdu–Chongqing 成渝铁路
- Suining–Chongqing railway; 遂渝铁路
- Yuli railway; Chongqing–Lichuan 渝利铁路
- Chongqing–Huaihua railway; Chongqing–Huaihua 渝怀铁路
- Sichuan–Guizhou railway; Chongqing–Guiyang 川黔铁路
- Guizhou–Guangxi railway Guiyang–Liuzhou 黔桂铁路
- Hunan–Guangxi railway Hengyang–Pingxiang 湘桂铁路
- Nanning–Kunming railway; Nanning–Kunming 南昆铁路
- Neijiang–Kunming railway; Neijiang–Kunming 内昆铁路
- Yunnan–Vietnam railway; Kunming–Hanoi 昆河铁路
- Guangtong–Dali railway; Guangtong Station–Dali 广大铁路
- Dali–Lijiang railway; Dali–Lijiang 大丽铁路
- Kunming–Yuxi railway; Kunming–Yuxi 昆玉铁路
- Weishe–Hongguo railway; Weishe–Hongguo 威红铁路
- Pan County West railway; Hongguo–Zhanyi 盘西铁路
- Liupanshui–Baiguo railway; Liupanshui–Baiguo 水柏铁路
- Yulin–Tieshangang railway; Yulin–Tieshangang 玉铁铁路
- Wen'an–Machangping railway 瓮马铁路 (under construction)
- Dali–Ruili railway 大瑞铁路 (under construction)

=== Northwest ===
- Linhe–Hami railway; Linhe–Ejin Banner 临策铁路
- Jiayuguan–Ceke railway; Jiayuguan–Ejin Banner 嘉策铁路
- Southern Xinjiang railway; Turpan–Kashgar 南疆铁路
- Kashgar–Hotan railway; Kashgar–Hotan 喀和铁路
- Jinghe–Yining–Khorgos railway; Jinghe–Yining–Khorgos 精伊霍铁路
- Kuytun–Beitun railway; Kuytun–Beitun 奎北铁路
- Ürümqi–Dzungaria railway; Ürümqi–Jiangjunmiao 乌准铁路
- Hami–Lop Nur railway; Hami–Lop Nur 哈罗铁路
- Hotan–Ruoqiang railway (under construction)
- Tianshui–Longnan railway 天陇铁路 (under construction)

=== Coal transport railways ===
- Datong–Qinhuangdao railway 大秦铁路
- Ningwu–Jingle railway 宁静铁路
- Shenhuang railway
- Houma–Yueshan railway 侯月铁路
- Xinxiang–Yueshan railway 新月铁路

== Intra-city Metros ==
- Urban rail transit in China
- Rail transport in Hong Kong

== Former railways ==
- Woosung Road

== International railways ==
- China–Nepal railway
- China–Pakistan railway
- China–Laos railway
- China–North Korea railway
- Yiwu–London railway line
- Chongqing–Xinjiang–Europe railway
- Yiwu–Madrid railway line
- Trans–Mongolian railway
