= Luoding Railway =

Railway line in Guangdong, China

The Luoding Railway (simplified Chinese: 罗定铁路; traditional Chinese: 羅定鐵路; pinyin: Luódìng Tiělù) is a privately owned railway in Guangdong Province, People's Republic of China. It became the only privately owned passenger rail service in the People's Republic of China in 2006, when it was sold to Shenzhen China Technology Industry Group Corporation Limited.

== See also ==
- Rail transport in the People's Republic of China
- List of railways in China
