= Beijing–Shanhaiguan railway =

Railway line in China

Beijing–Shanhaiguan railway 京山铁路
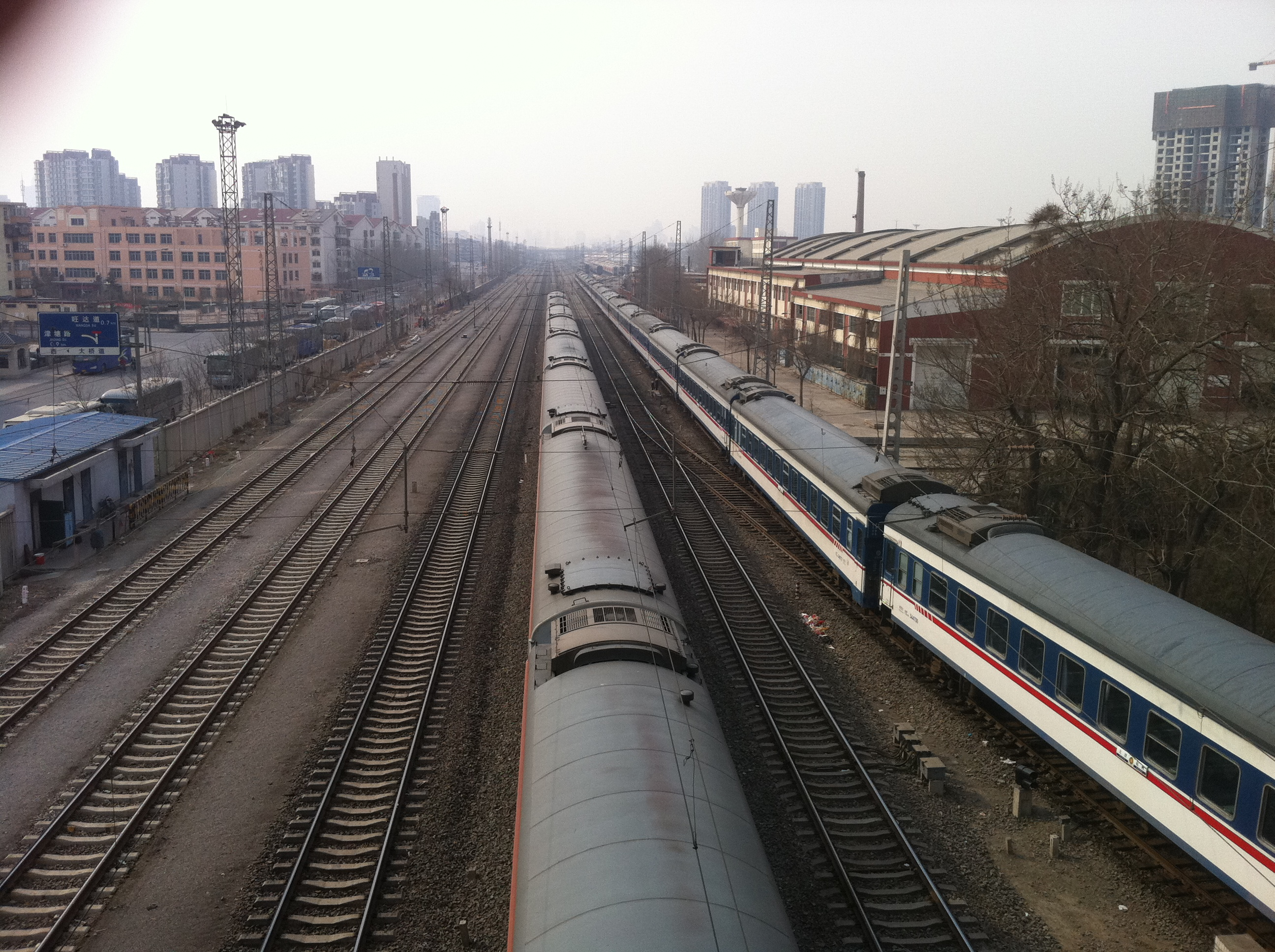

Overview
- Status: Active
- Termini: Beijing; Shanhaiguan
- Stations: 22

Service
- Type: Heavy rail
- System: China Railway
- Operator: China Railway

Technical
- Track gauge: 1,435 mm (4 ft 8 1/2 in) standard gauge

The Beijing–Shanhaiguan railway, abbreviated as the Jingshan Railway (simplified Chinese: 京山铁路; traditional Chinese: 京山鐵路; pinyin: Jīngshān tiělù) or the Jingyu Railway (simplified Chinese: 京榆铁路; traditional Chinese: 京榆鐵路; pinyin: Jīngyú tiělù), is a branch railway that runs from the capital city of Beijing to the Shanhaiguan District of Qinhuangdao via Tianjin. It contains a total of 22 stations.

== Cities ==
The railway passes through the following cities:

- Beijing (北京市)
- Hebei: Langfang (廊坊市), Tangshan (唐山市), Qinhuangdao (秦皇岛)
- Tianjin

== Connecting railways ==
In Beijing, the railway leaves Beijing railway station and branches off to form other railways, including the Beijing–Kowloon, Beijing–Guangzhou, and Fengtai–Shacheng railways.

In Tianjin, it intersects with the Tianjin–Jizhou railway, the Tianjin–Bazhou railway, the Tianjin–Pukou railway, and the Tianjin North Ring railway. After it re-enters Hebei Province, the railroad will intersect with the Qidaoqiao–Luan County railway at Tangshan, as well as the Tangshan–Zunhua railway. Afterwards, it meets with the Beijing–Qinhuangdao railway and follows a parallel path until the two finally come together with the Datong–Qinhuangdao railway at Qinhuangdao.

== See also ==
- Rail transport in China
- List of railways in China
