= Langshan railway station =

Railway station in Hebei, China

Coordinates: 40°21′05″N 115°40′55″E

Langshan 狼山站
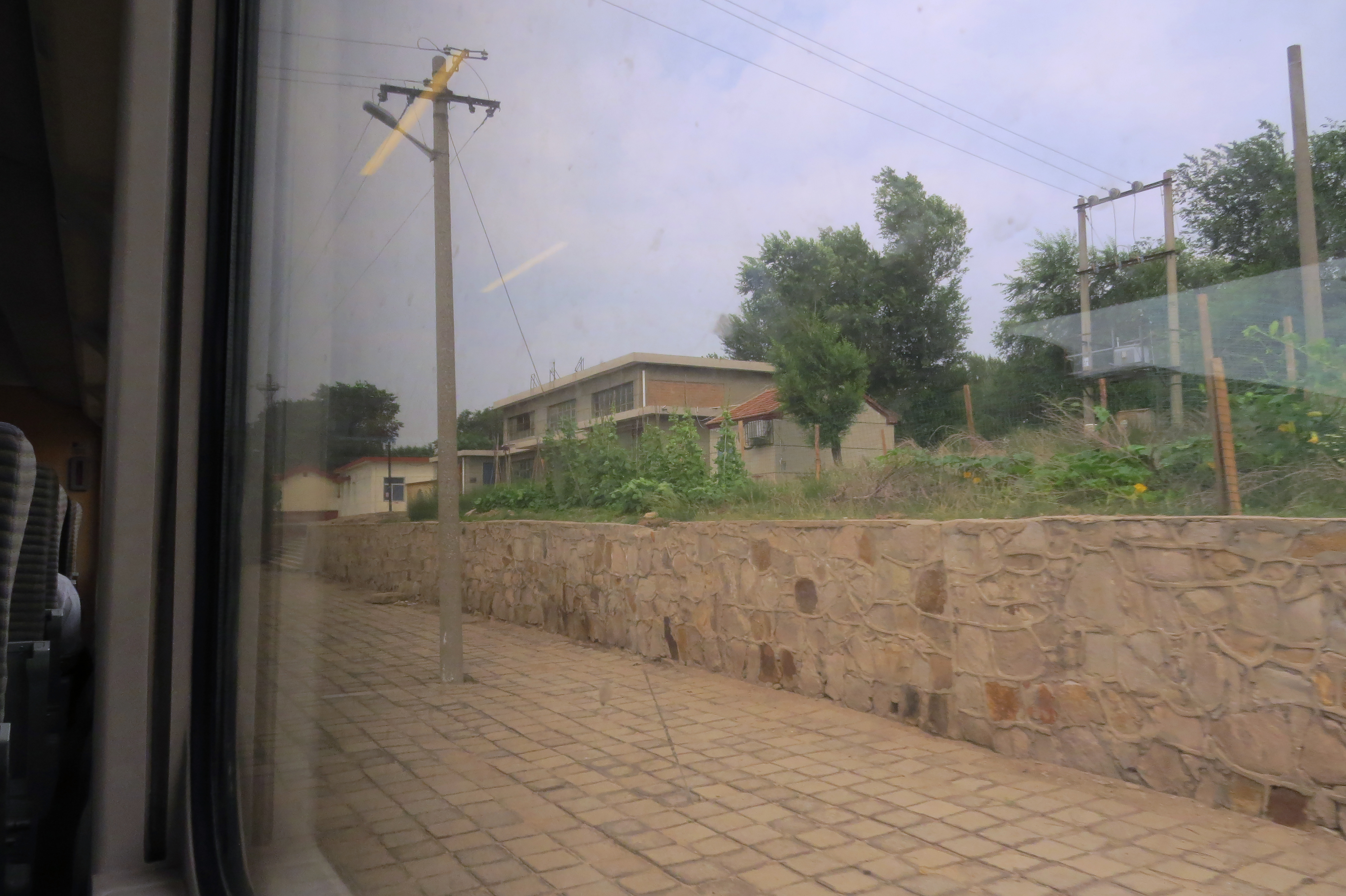

General information
- Location: Huailai County, Zhangjiakou, Hebei; China
- Line(s): Beijing-Baotou railway

Other information
- Station code: LEP

Langshan railway station (Chinese: 狼山站) is a station on the Beijing–Baotou railway located in Langshan Township, Huailai County, Hebei.

== See also ==
- List of stations on Jingbao railway
