= Dongdu–Pingyi railway =

Railway line in Shandong, China

The Dongdu–Pingyi railway or Dongping railway (simplified Chinese: 东平铁路; traditional Chinese: 東平鐵路; pinyin: dōngpíng tiělù), is a railroad in northern China between Dongdu, near Xintai, and Pingyi central Shandong Province. The line, 60.19 km (37 mi) in length was built from 2009 to 2010 at the cost of 1.2558 billion Renminbi. The line is jointly owned by the Jinan Railway Bureau, Laiwu Iron & Steel Group, Xinwen Mining Enterprises Group and Port of Rizhao Joint Stock Company, and serves primarily to carry coal mined in central Shandong and imported iron ore to steel mills in Laiwu and exported steel products to the Port of Rizhao.

== History ==
The railway opened on 22 November 2010.

== Rail connections ==
- Pingyi: Yanzhou–Shijiusuo railway
- Dongdu: Ciyao–Laiwu railway

== See also ==
- List of railways in China
