= Shacheng =

Shacheng may refer to the following locations in China:

- Shacheng, Fuding (沙埕镇), town in Fujian
- Shacheng, Huailai County (沙城镇), town in Hebei
  - Shacheng railway station (沙城站), station on the Beijing–Baotou Railway near Zhangjiakou, Hebei
- Shacheng Subdistrict (沙城街道), Longwan District, Wenzhou, Zhejiang
