= Beijing–Yuanping railway =

Railway line in China

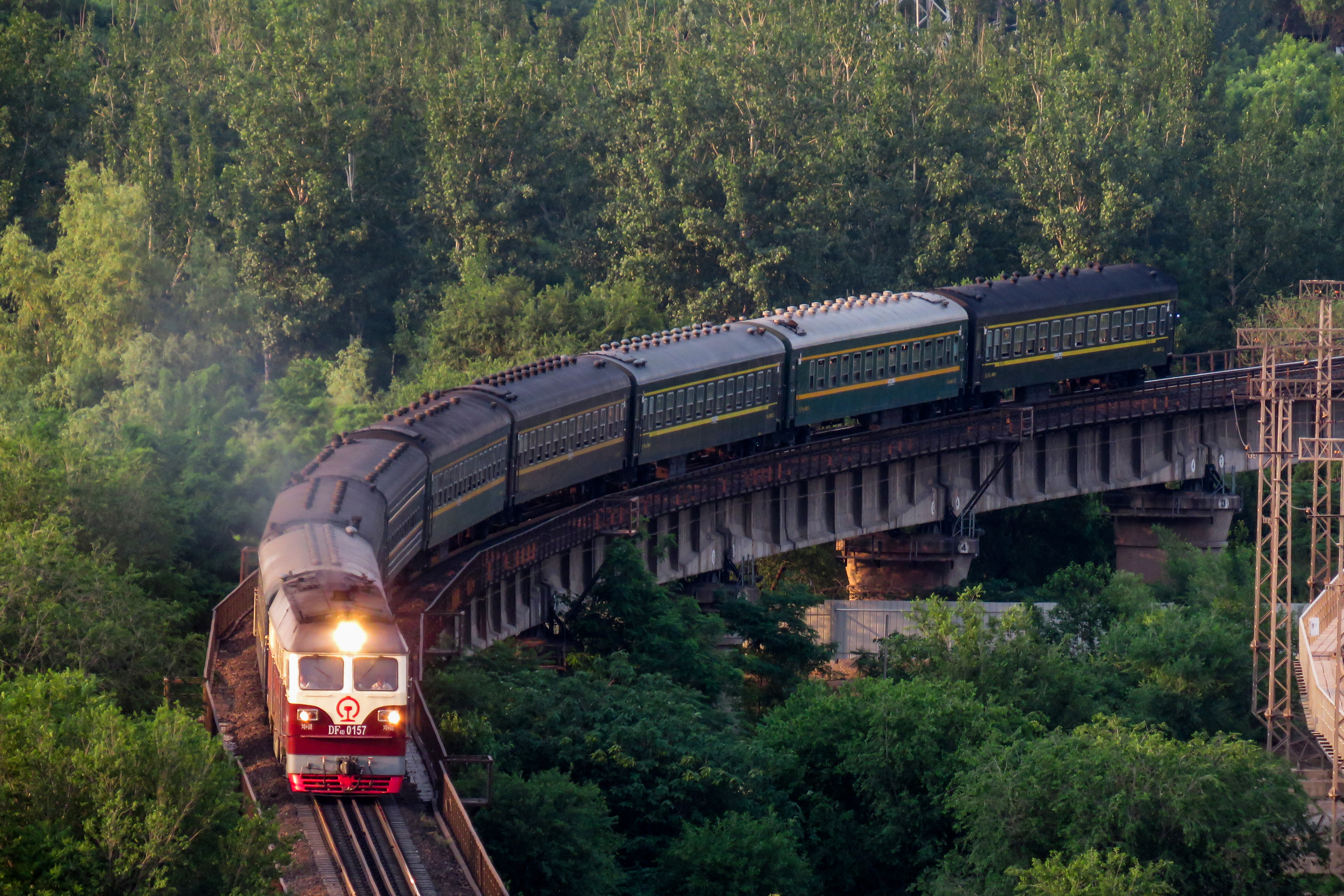
- An ordinary passenger train near Beijing Garden Expo Park in 2018

Overview
- Native name: 京原铁路
- Status: In operation
- Termini: Shijingshan South railway station; Yuanping railway station
- Stations: 50

Service
- Type: Heavy rail
- Operator: China Railway

History
- Opened: 1973

Technical
- Line length: 418.64 km (260.13 mi)
- Number of tracks: 1
- Track gauge: 1,435 mm (4 ft 8 1/2 in) standard gauge
- Electrification: AC 25 kV 50 Hz with overhead catenary (Lingqiu–Yuanping)
- Operating speed: 80 km/h (50 mph)

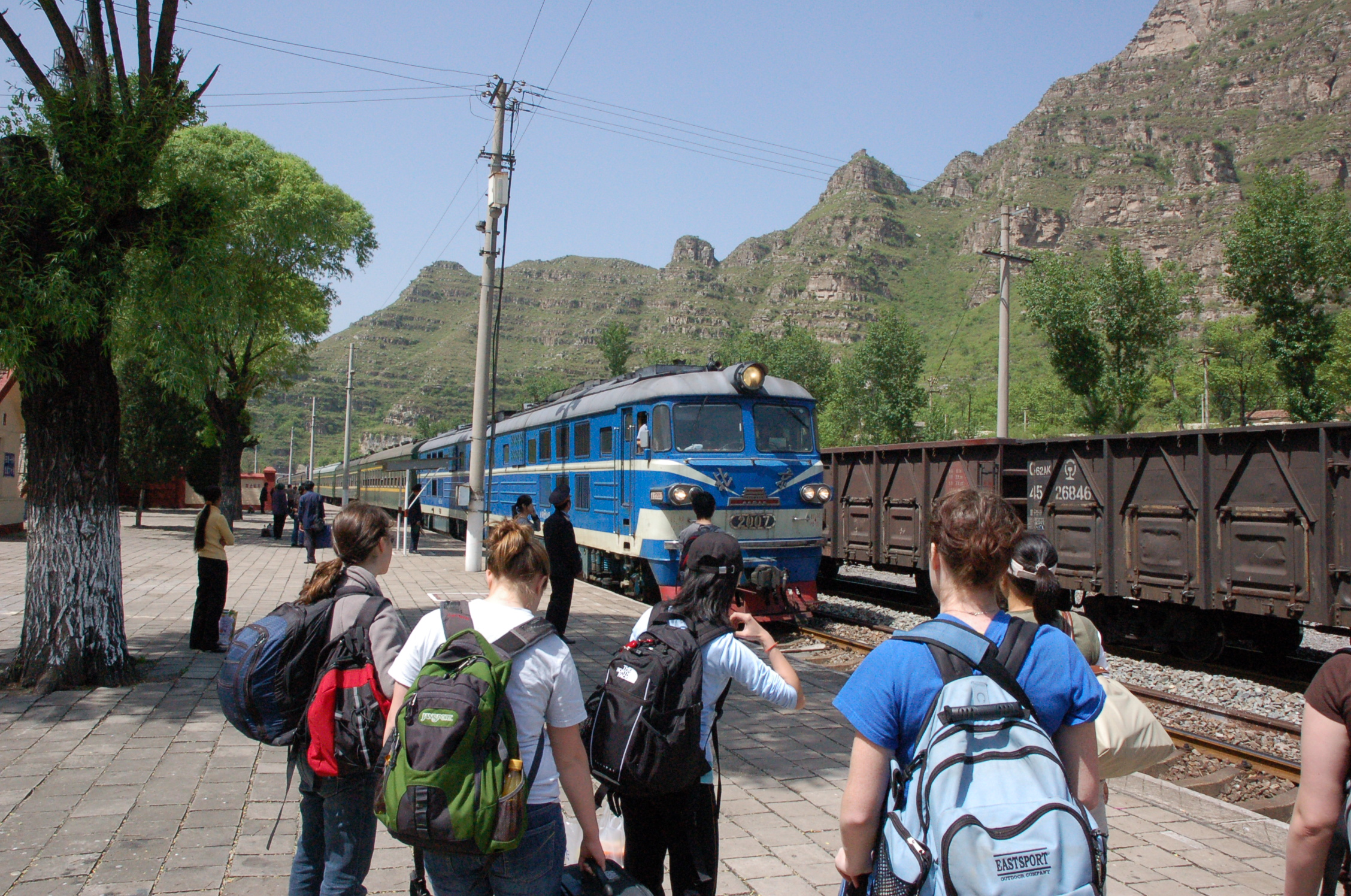
Shidu station in Fangshan District, Beijing

The Beijing–Yuanping railway or Jingyuan railway (simplified Chinese: 京原铁路; traditional Chinese: 京原鐵路; pinyin: jīngyuán tiělù), is a railway line in northern China between Beijing, the national capital, and Yuanping in Shanxi Province. The line is 418 km (260 mi) in length, and traverses through Beijing Municipality, Hebei Province and Shanxi Province. The Beijing–Yuanping railway was built between 1965 and 1971, and entered into operation in 1973. At the time of its construction, the line was primarily intended to transport coal from Shanxi and move military assets in the event of a national defense emergency. The line runs almost entirely in mountainous terrain. Major cities and counties along the route include Beijing, Laiyuan, Lingqiu, Fanshi, Dai and Yuanping.

== Route ==
In Beijing, the Jingyuan Line begins at the Shijingshan South Railway Station, a junction with the Fengtai–Shacheng railway in Fengtai District west of the city, and runs westward through Shijingshan District and Fangshan Districts into the Western Hills. The line passes Zhoukoudian and follows the gorge of Juma River from Sandu in western Fangshan, upriver to Laiyuan in Hebei Province. Along the way, the line passes through scenic areas including Shidu, the Zijingguan Great Wall, and the Eastern Qing Tombs. From Laiyuan, the line continues westward through the Taihang Mountains into Shanxi. West of Lingqiu, the line follows the Hutuo River into the Yiding Basin, where the line runs between the Heng and Wutai Mountains to Dai County and Yuanping. At Yuanping, the line connects to the Datong–Puzhou railway.

== History ==
The Beijing–Yuanping railway was planned and built by the People's Liberation Army Rail Corps. In June 1965, the Rail Corps assigned its 4th and 13th Divisions to begin preparatory work in Fangshan and Laiyuan, but the 13th Division was reassigned to support North Vietnam in the Vietnam War and the 14th Division was ordered to take its place. By spring 1967, the work began on the Yimaling and Pingxingguan Tunnels. The two tunnels, respectively, at 7,032 m (23,071 ft) and 6,190 m (20,308 ft) in length, were longest and third longest railway tunnels in China at the time. Due to the mountainous terrain, the line has 120 tunnels that are collectively 97 km (60 mi) in length and 216 bridges that are collectively 20 km (12 mi) in length. The Cultural Revolution caused disruption and shortage of materials which delayed the completion of the railway, originally scheduled for 1970. The laying of tracks was completed on October 30, 1971. In 1973, the rail line officially entered into operations.

Since March 2016, electrification construction of Jingyuan railway has started. As of 2018 it's completed within Shanxi province between Lingqiu and Yuanping stations. The rest sections in Beijing and Hebei provinces are started in 2019.

== Rail connections ==
- Shijingshan South: Fengtai–Shacheng railway
- Yuanping: Datong–Puzhou railway

== See also ==
- List of railways in China
