= Juma River (China) =

River in China

Coordinates: 39.5234°N 115.1150°E

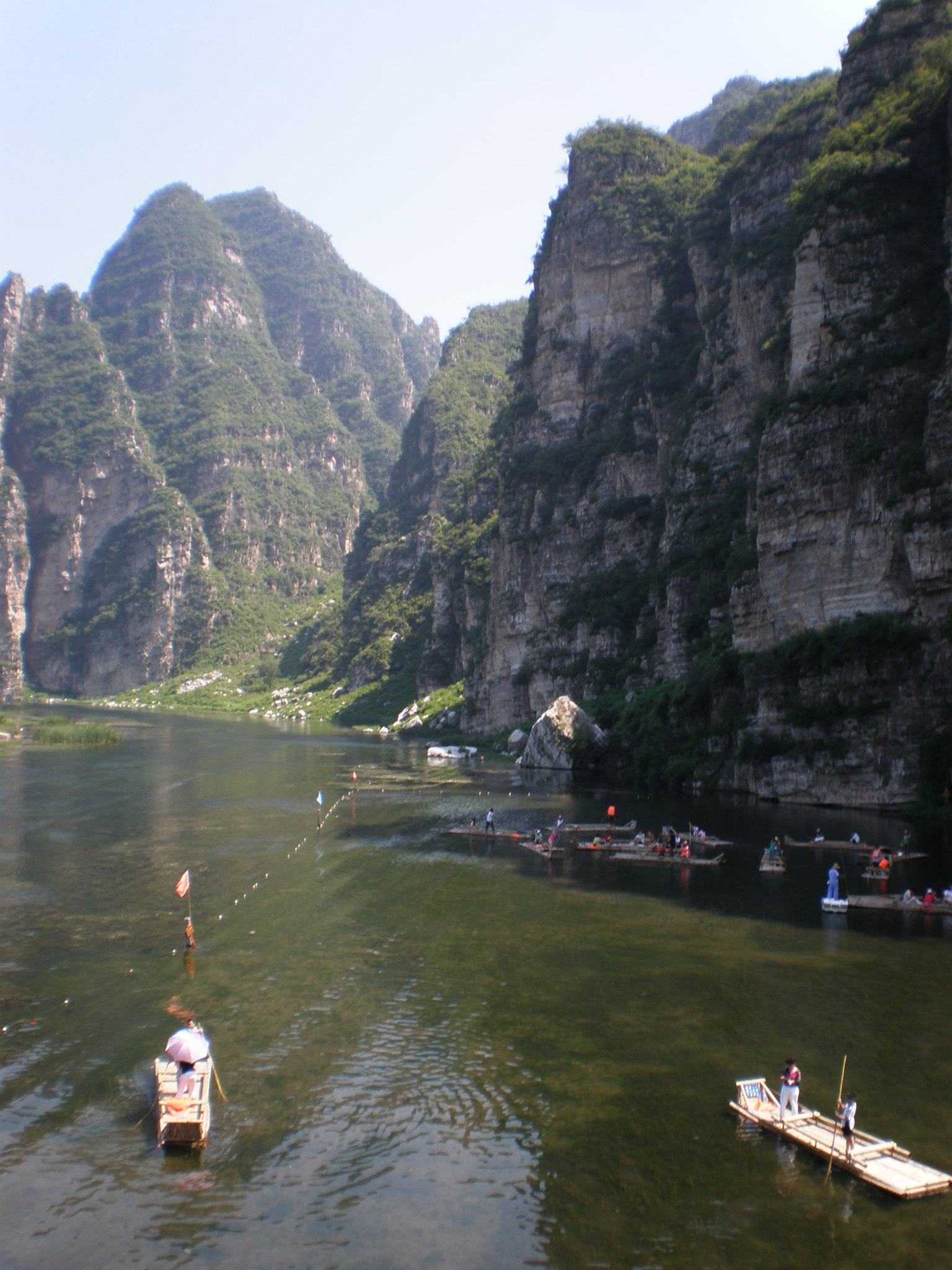
Juma River through the canyons at Shidu in Fangshan District, Beijing.

Juma River (Chinese: 拒马河; pinyin: Jùmǎ Hé; lit. 'Stop the horse') is a river in northern China that emerges from a spring-fed lake in Laiyuan County, Hebei Province and flows to Fangshan District in Beijing Municipality before emptying into the Daqing River, a tributary of the Hai River. The length of the river is approximately 254 km. At Shidu, the meandering river creates a deep valley in the scenic karst landscape. At Zhangfang, the river forks into the Northern and Southern Juma, both of which flow into the Daqing. The Beijing–Yuanping Railway follows the Juma River through the Taihang Mountains.

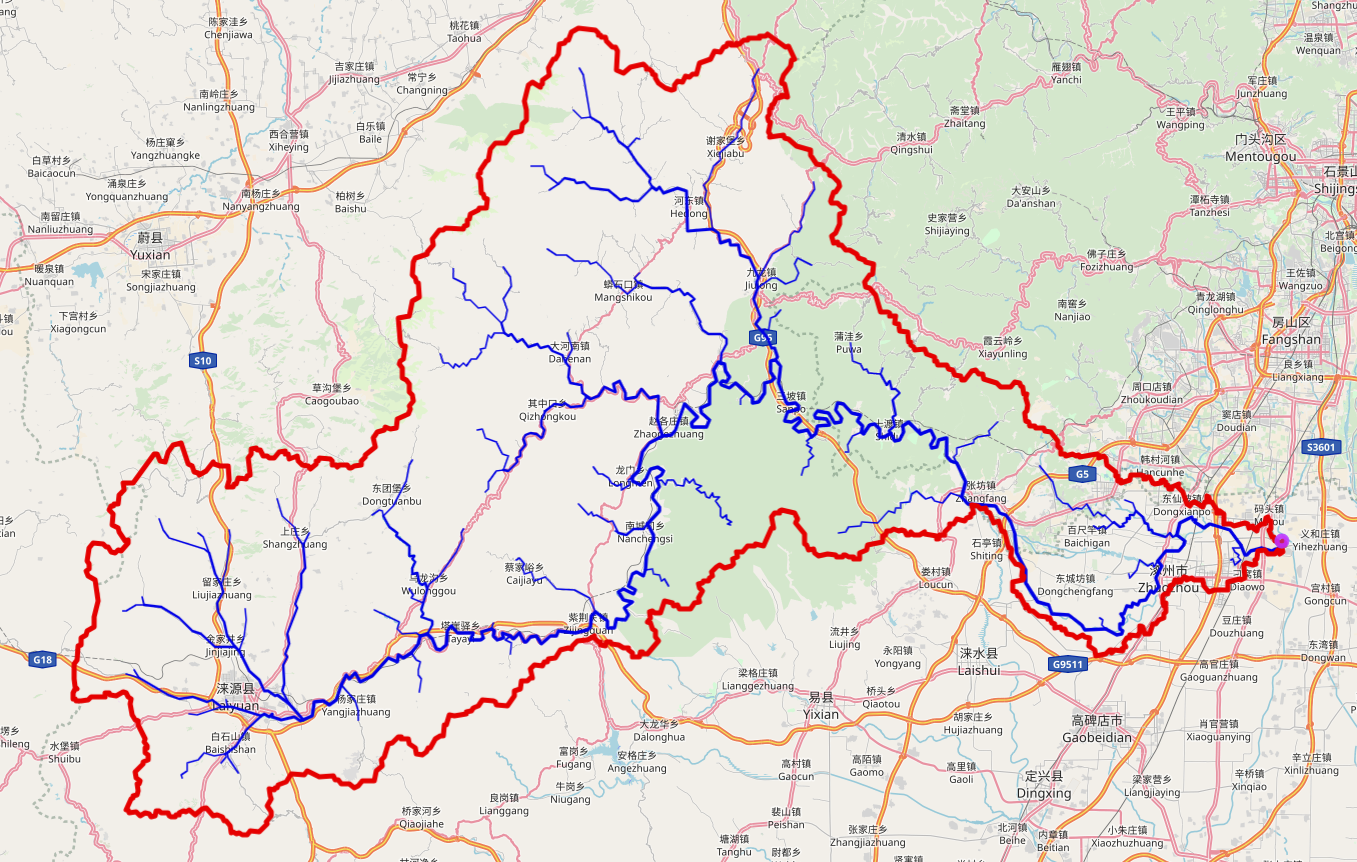
Juma river basin
