= Xindian–Taian railway =

Railway line in Shandong, China

The Xindian–Tai'an railway or Xintai railway (simplified Chinese: 辛泰铁路; traditional Chinese: 辛泰鐵路; pinyin: xīntài tiělù) is a railroad in northern China between Xindian, near Linzi, and Tai'an, in central Shandong Province. The line, 163.3 km (101 mi) in length, was built from 1970 to 1974 and has 24 stations. The line connects the Beijing–Shanghai and Jiaozhou–Jinan railways.

== Rail connections ==
- Xindian (Linzi): Jiaozhou–Jinan railway
- Laiwu: Ciyao–Laiwu railway
- Tai'an: Beijing–Shanghai railway

== See also ==
- List of railways in China
