= Cunrui =

Cunrui 存瑞镇
- Town
- Cúnruì Zhèn
- Location in Hebei Location in China
- Coordinates: 40°28′33″N 115°33′36″E
- Country: People's Republic of China
- Province: Hebei
- Prefecture-level city: Zhangjiakou
- County: Huailai

Area
  - Total: 204.8 km^{2} (79.1 sq mi)

Population (2010)
  - Total: 25,191
  - Density: 123/km^{2} (320/sq mi)
- Time zone: UTC+8 (China Standard)

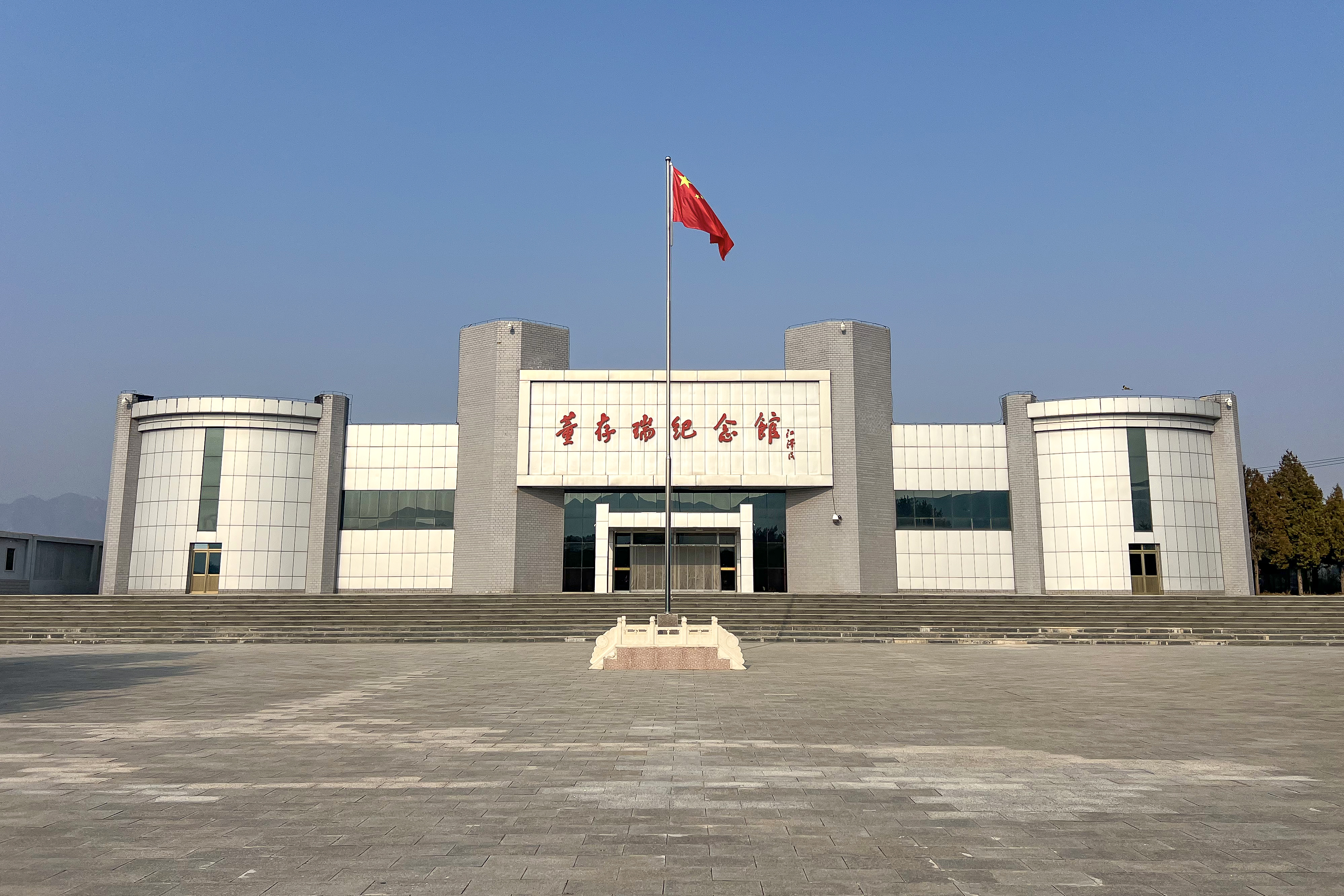
Dong Cunrui Memorial Hall

Cunrui (Chinese: 存瑞镇; pinyin: Cúnruì Zhèn) is a town located in Huailai County, Zhangjiakou, Hebei, China. According to the 2010 census, Cunrui had a population of 25,191, including 13,166 males and 12,025 females. The population was distributed as follows: 4,044 people aged under 14, 18,592 people aged between 15 and 64, and 2,555 people aged over 65.

== See also ==
- List of township-level divisions of Hebei
