= Great Wall Wine =

Chinese wine producer

China Great Wall Wine Co., Ltd. 中国长城葡萄酒有限公司
- Company type: Subsidiary
- Industry: alcoholic beverages
- Founded: 1983
- Headquarters: Shacheng, Hebei, China
- Area served: Worldwide
- Products: dry and sweet wines, fortified wines, distilled and sparking wines.
- Parent: COFCO Group
- Website: greatwallwine.com.cn

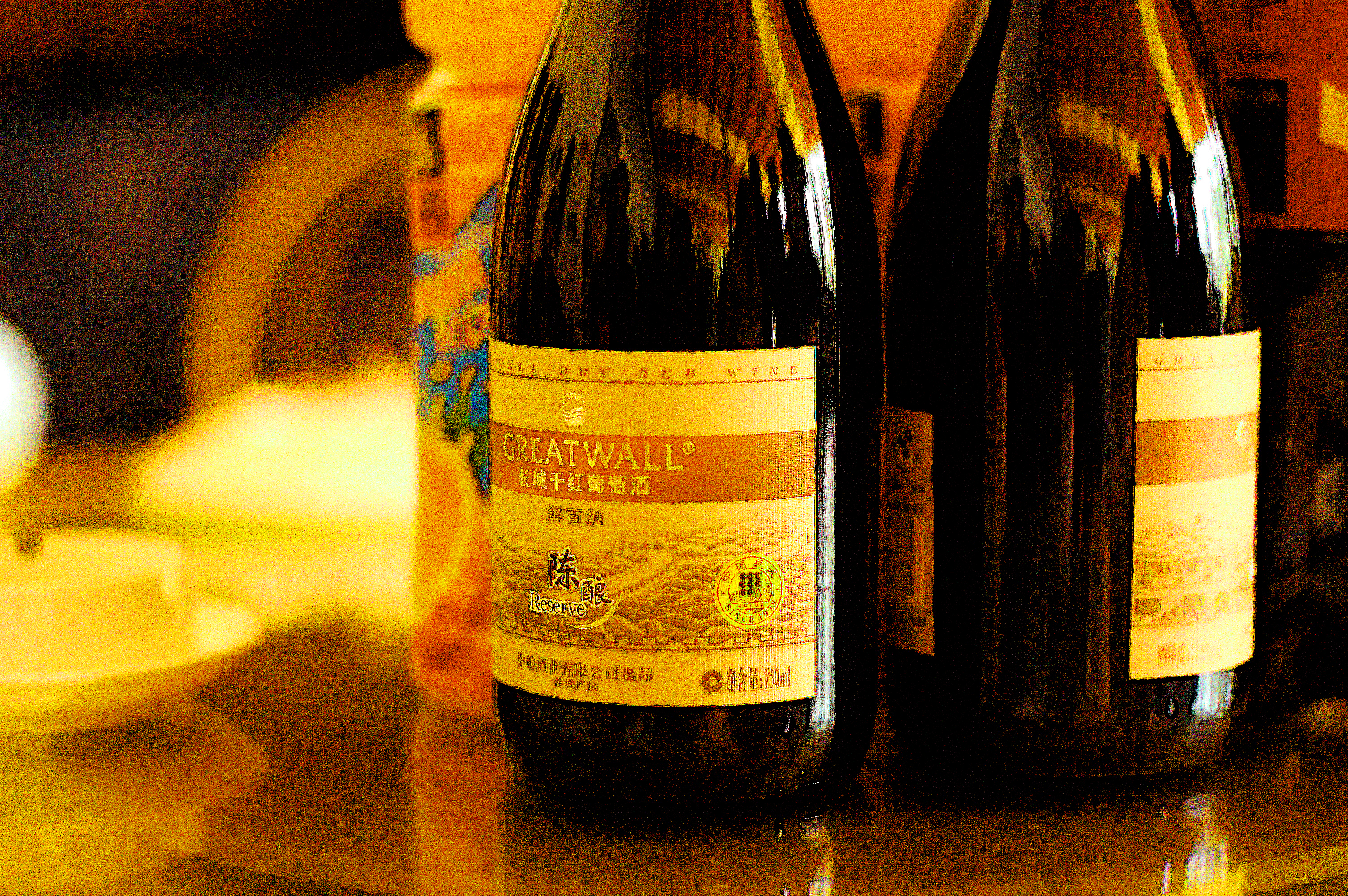
Bottles of the Great Wall dry red wine

China Great Wall Wine Co., Ltd. is a Chinese producer of wine based in Shacheng town, Huailai County, Zhangjiakou, Hebei province, China. By production volume, Great Wall is China's largest wine enterprise, producing 50,000 tons in 2010.

== Overview ==
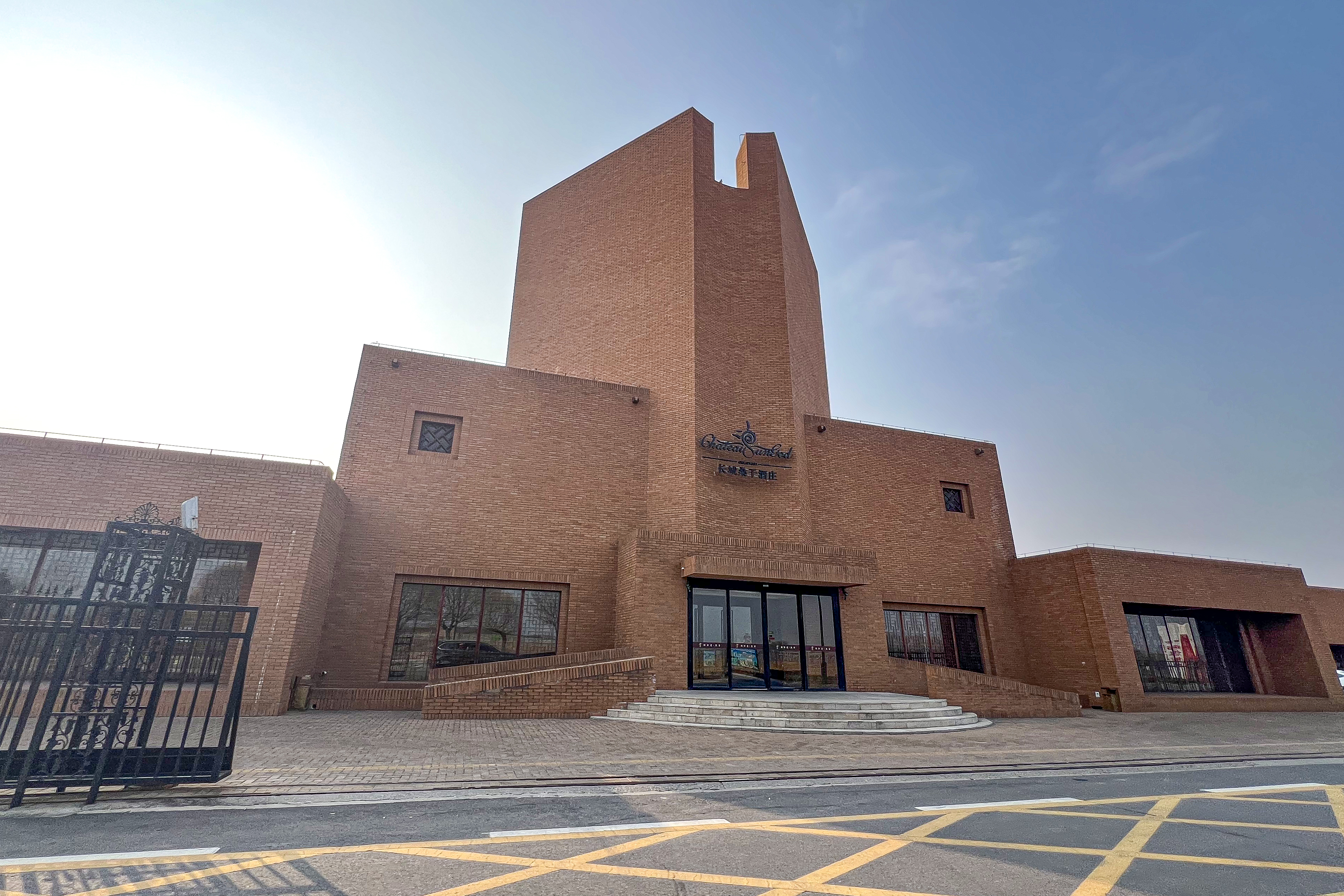
Chateau SunGod GreatWall, one of the wineries operated by Great Wall Wine, in Huailai, Hebei

Founded in 1983, Great Wall is a subsidiary of state-owned COFCO Group and their COFCO Wines & Spirits Co., Ltd.- a subsidiary of COFCO group that specializes in alcoholic drinks. Its main office is situated at the foot of the Great Wall of China, next to the Guanting Lake.

The company has 74.8 hectares (1,125 mu) of vineyards, mostly in Shandong province. More than ten different varieties of grapes are grown there. It uses 1,375 twenty-ton storage vessels with a total capacity of approximately 30,000 tons.

Great Wall uses modern wine making equipment that is imported from France, Germany, and Italy. The company produces dry and sweet wines, fortified wines, distilled and sparkling wines. In 2010, Great Wall produced 50,000 tons, making it China's largest wine producer.

The company markets its products in 20 countries or regions, such as USA, France, Germany, the United Kingdom, and domestically in 29 provinces.
