= Shidu, Beijing =

Shidu Town 十渡镇
- Town
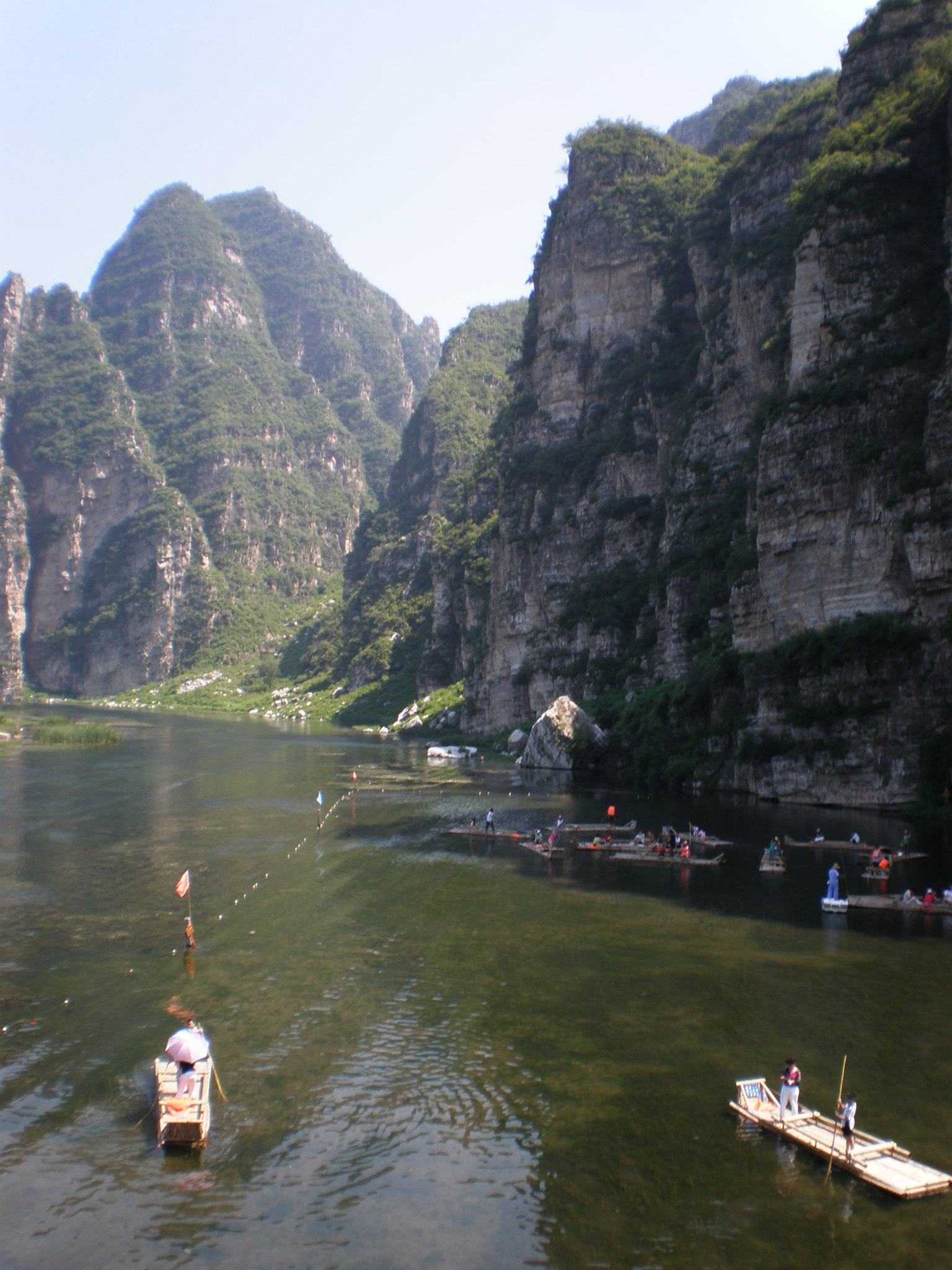
- Shidu River, namesake of the town, 2008

- Location within Beijing Location within China
- Coordinates: 39°38′22″N 115°35′00″E
- Country: China
- Municipality: Beijing
- District: Fangshan
- Village-level Divisions: 21 villages

Area
  - Total: 47.51 km^{2} (18.34 sq mi)

Population (2020)
  - Total: 9,132
  - Density: 192.2/km^{2} (497.8/sq mi)
- Time zone: UTC+8 (China Standard)
- Postal code: 102411
- Area code: 010

Shidu Town (Chinese: 十渡镇; pinyin: Shídù Zhèn) is a town in Fangshan District in far southwestern Beijing, around 4 kilometres (2.5 mi) from the border with Hebei. Shidu, literally the "Tenth Ferry", is located in the valley of the meandering Juma River and so named because accessing the town is said to require crossing the river ten times. Shidu is known for the surrounding karst landscape, the largest in northern China, that is created by the Juma River cutting through the Taihang Mountain. The elevation of Shidu varies from 84.2 to 1,210.8 metres (276 to 3,972 ft) above the sea level. As of 2020, it had a total population of 9,132.

The Beijing–Yuanping Railway has a station in Shidu.

== History ==
Timeline of Shidu Town's History
Time	Status	Within
Qing dynasty	Shiduli (十渡里)	Fangshan County (房山县）
1912 - 1949	Shiduli (十渡里)	Fangshan County (房山县）
1949 - 1954	2nd District (二区)	Fangshan County (房山县）
1954 - 1956	Split into 8 townships: Liudu (六渡); Ma'an (马安); Pingyu (平峪); Liuhe (六合); Shidu (十渡); Shimen (石门); Taiping (太平); Wanglaopu (王老铺)	Fangshan County (房山县）
1956 - 1958	Split into 4 townships: Liudu, Shidu, Shimen and Wanglaopu	Fangshan County (房山县）
1958 - 1961	Liudu Township Shidu Township Ma'an People's Commune	Zhoukoudian District (周口店区)
1961 - 1983	Shidu People's Commune Ma'an People's Commune	Fangshan County
1983 - 1986	Liudu Township Shidu Township	Fangshan District
1986 - 1989	Liudu Township Shidu Township	Fangshan District
1989–present	Shidu Town	Fangshan District

== Administrative divisions ==
In 2020, Shidu Town was made up of 21 villages, all of which are listed down below:

Administrative division code	Subdivision names	Name transliteration
110111111200	平峪	Pingyu
110111111201	北石门	Bei Shimen
110111111202	西石门	Xi Shimen
110111111203	前头港	Qiantougang
110111111204	西河	Xihe
110111111205	西庄	Xizhuang
110111111206	九渡	Jiudu
110111111207	八渡	Badu
110111111208	十渡	Shidu
110111111209	马安	Ma'an
110111111210	卧龙	Wolong
110111111211	六合	Liuhe
110111111212	东太平	Dong Taiping
110111111213	西太平	Xi Taiping
110111111214	新村	Xincun
110111111215	西关上	Xiguanshang
110111111216	六渡	Liudu
110111111217	七渡	Qidu
110111111218	五合	Wuhe
110111111219	栗元厂	Liyuanchang
110111111220	王老铺	Wanglaopu

== Gallery ==
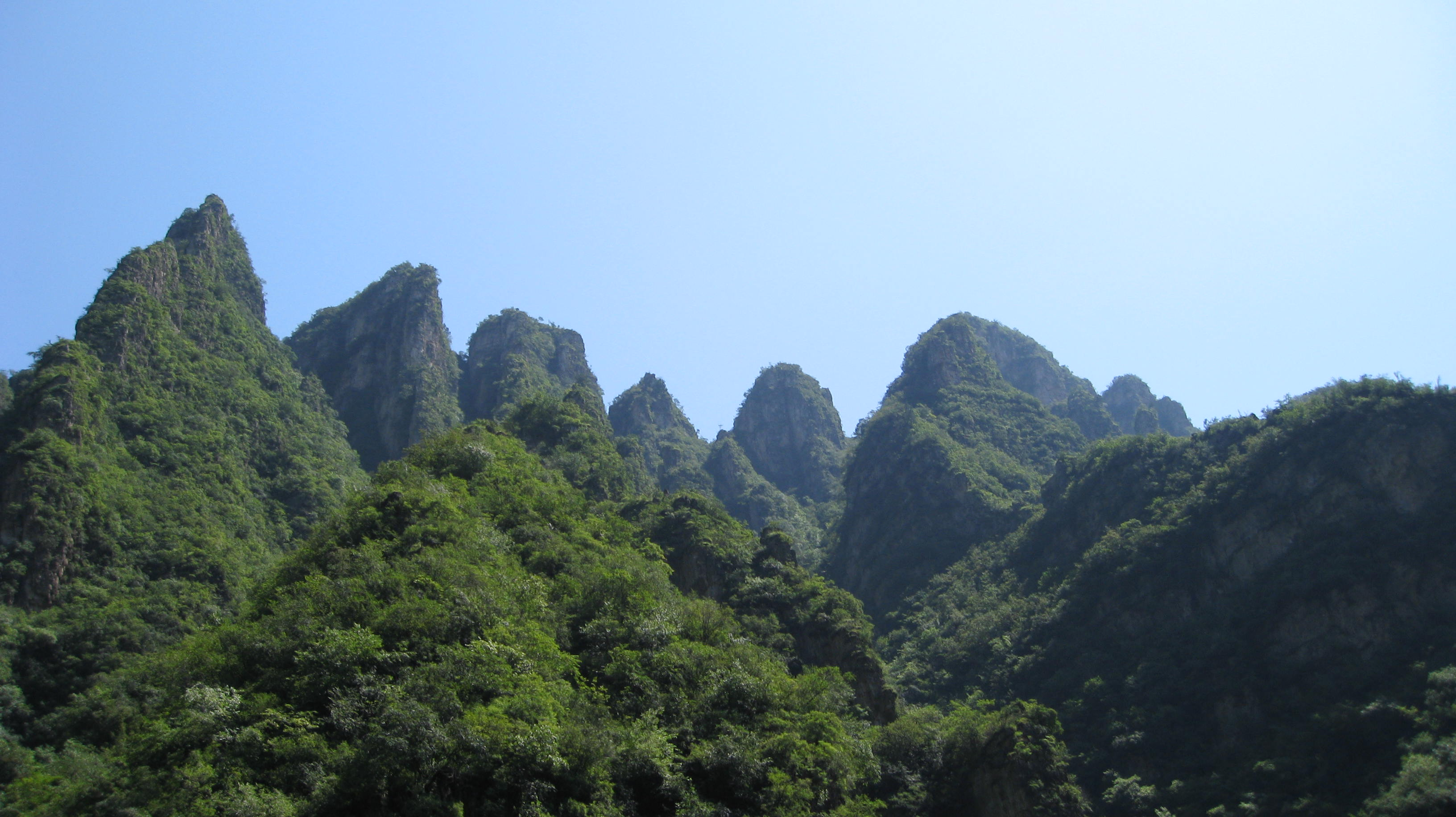
Mountains of Shidu, 2008

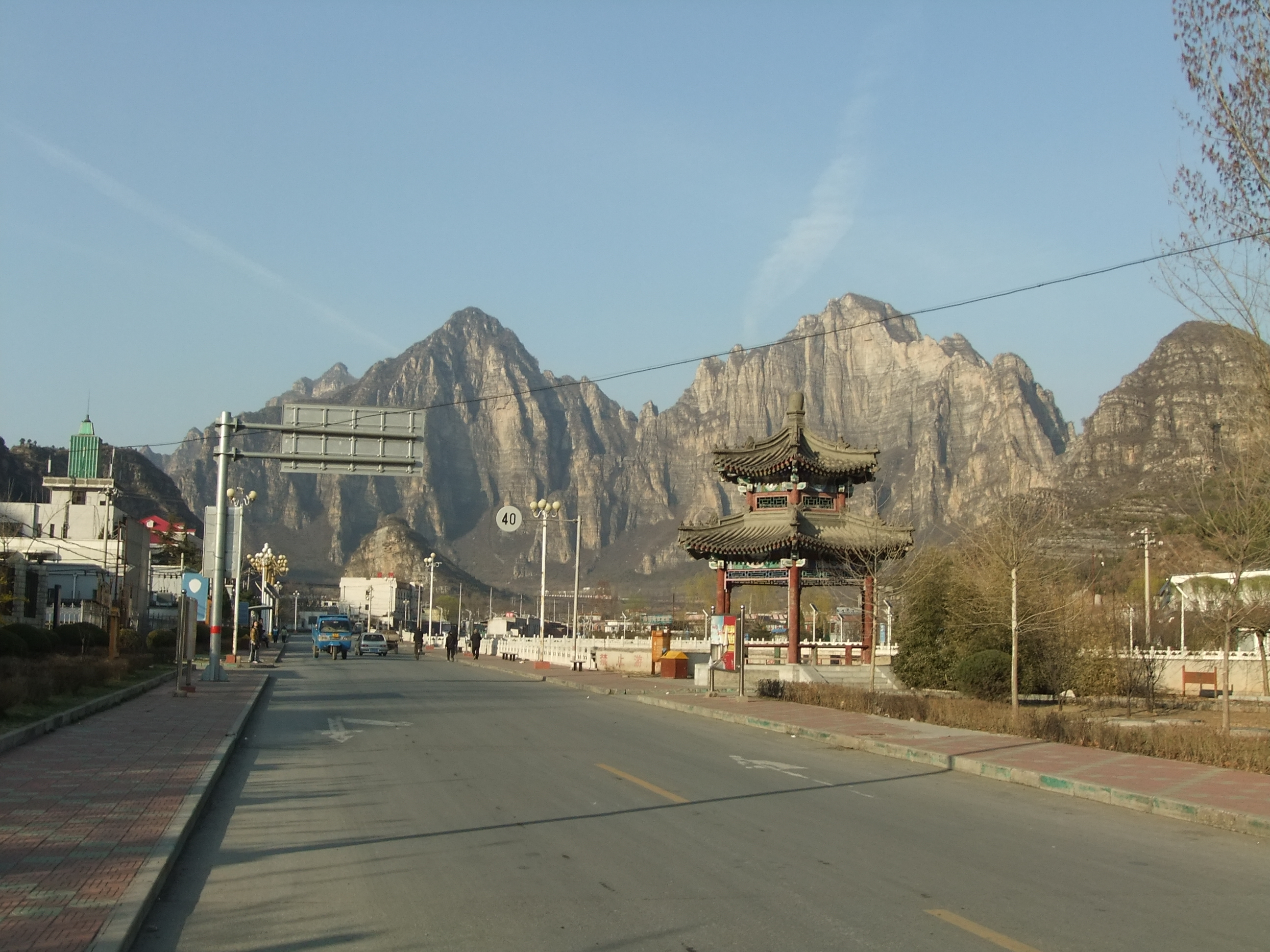
Shidu Town, 2011

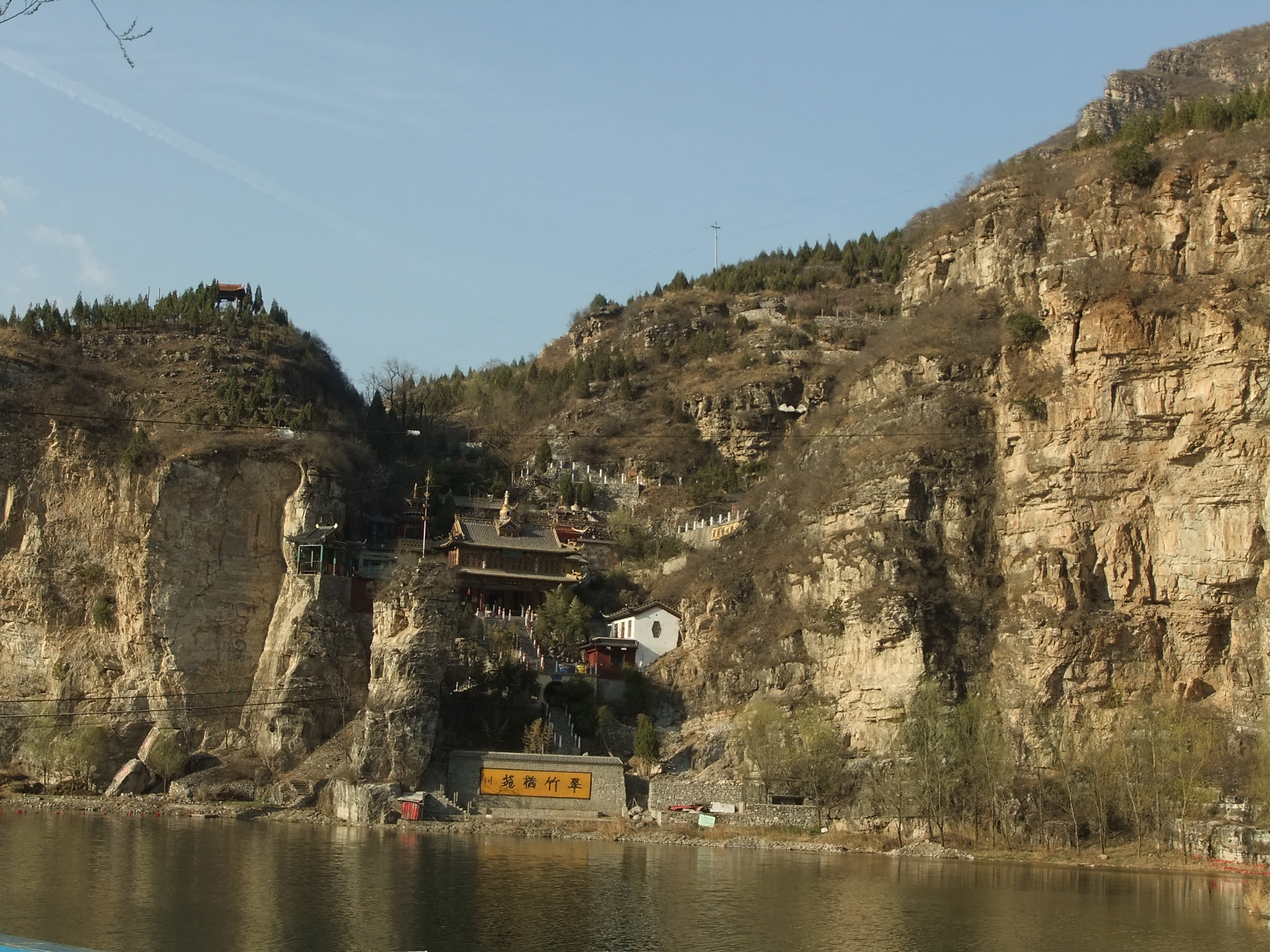
Green Bamboo Bridge Garden, 2011

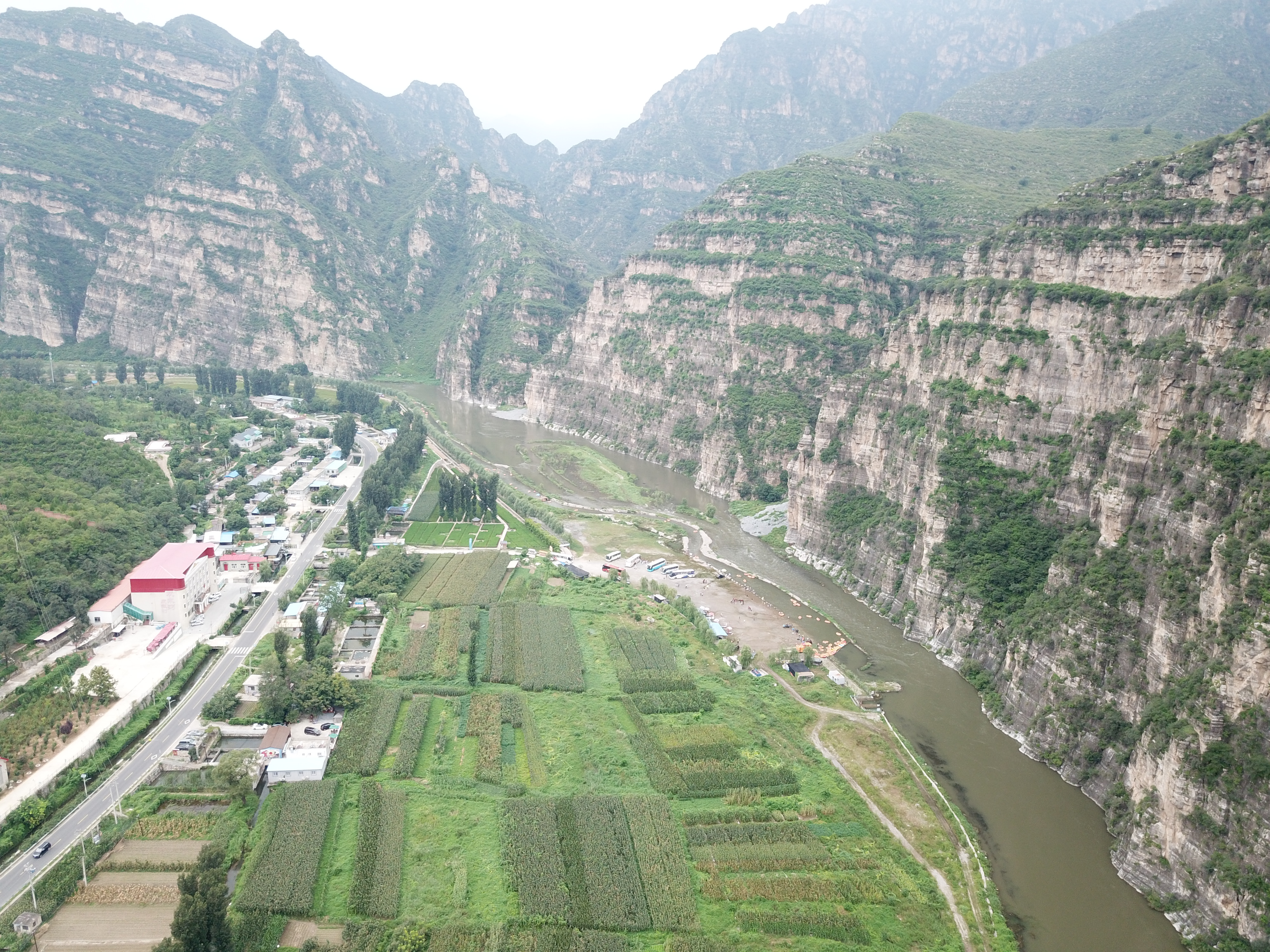
Aerial view of Shidu Town and Juma River, 2018

== See also ==
- List of township-level divisions of Beijing
