= Dahuangzhuang =

Dahuangzhuang 大黄庄镇
- Town
- Dàhuángzhuāng Zhèn
- Location in Hebei Location in China
- Coordinates: 40°24′01″N 115°22′30″E
- Country: People's Republic of China
- Province: Hebei
- Prefecture-level city: Zhangjiakou
- County: Huailai

Area
  - Total: 40.43 km^{2} (15.61 sq mi)

Population (2010)
  - Total: 16,438
  - Density: 406.6/km^{2} (1,053/sq mi)
- Time zone: UTC+8 (China Standard)

Dahuangzhuang (Chinese: 大黄庄镇; pinyin: Dàhuángzhuāng Zhèn) is a town located in Huailai County, Zhangjiakou, Hebei, China. According to the 2010 census, Dahuangzhuang had a population of 16,438, including 8,514 males and 7,924 females. The population was distributed as follows: 2,605 people aged under 14, 12,338 people aged between 15 and 64, and 1,495 people aged over 65.

== See also ==
- List of township-level divisions of Hebei
