= Sangyuan, Huailai County =

Sangyuan 桑园镇
- Town
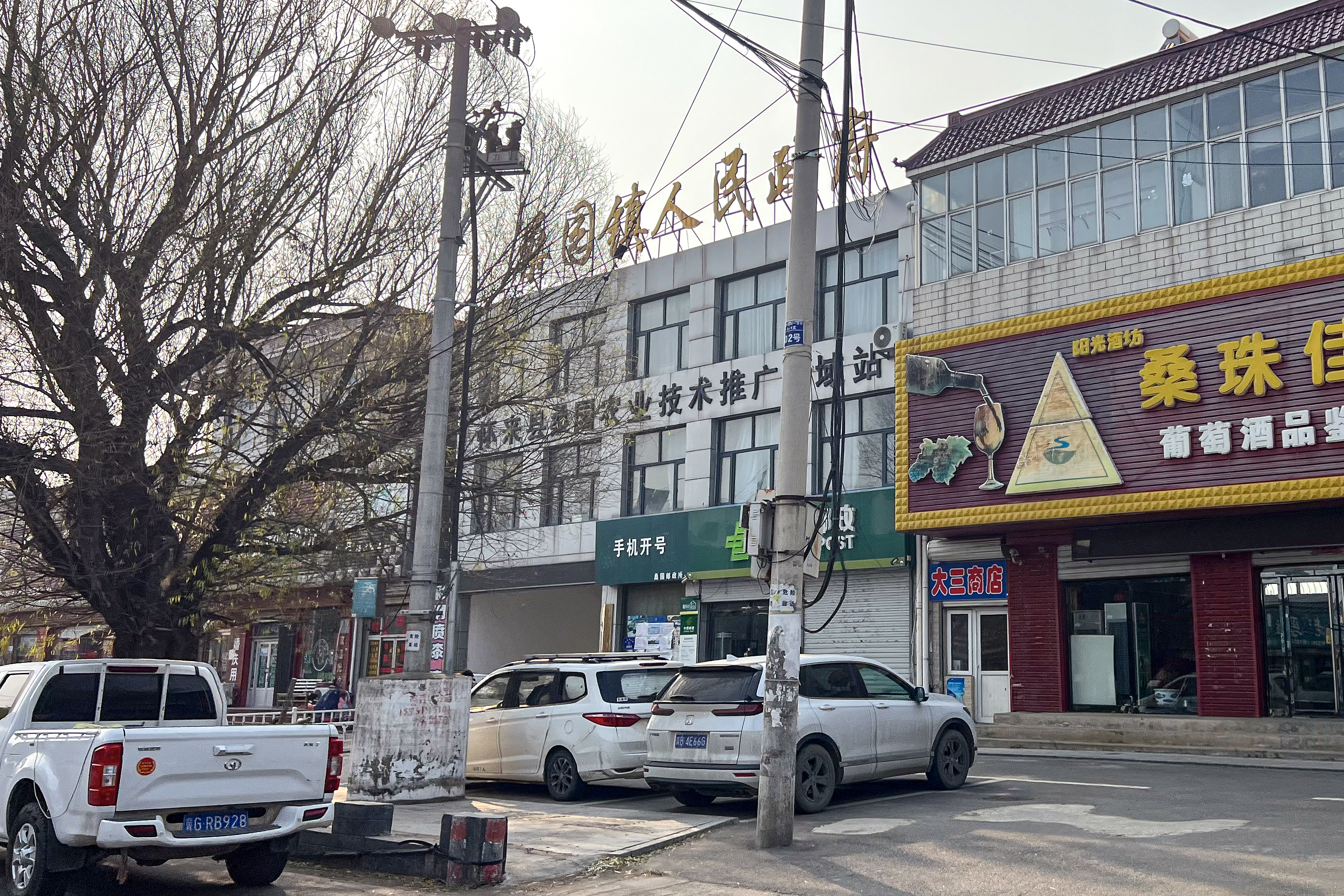
- Government of Sangyuan Town

- Location in Hebei
- Coordinates: 40°17′20″N 115°32′16″E
- Country: People's Republic of China
- Province: Hebei
- Prefecture-level city: Zhangjiakou
- County: Huailai County

Population (2019)
  - Total: 25,658
- Time zone: UTC+8 (China Standard)

Sangyuan (simplified Chinese: 桑园; traditional Chinese: 桑園; pinyin: Sāngyuán) is a town in Huailai County, in Hebei province, China. As of 2018, it has 31 villages under its administration. In 2019 it had a population of 25,658.
