= Fengtai–Shacheng railway =

Railway line in China

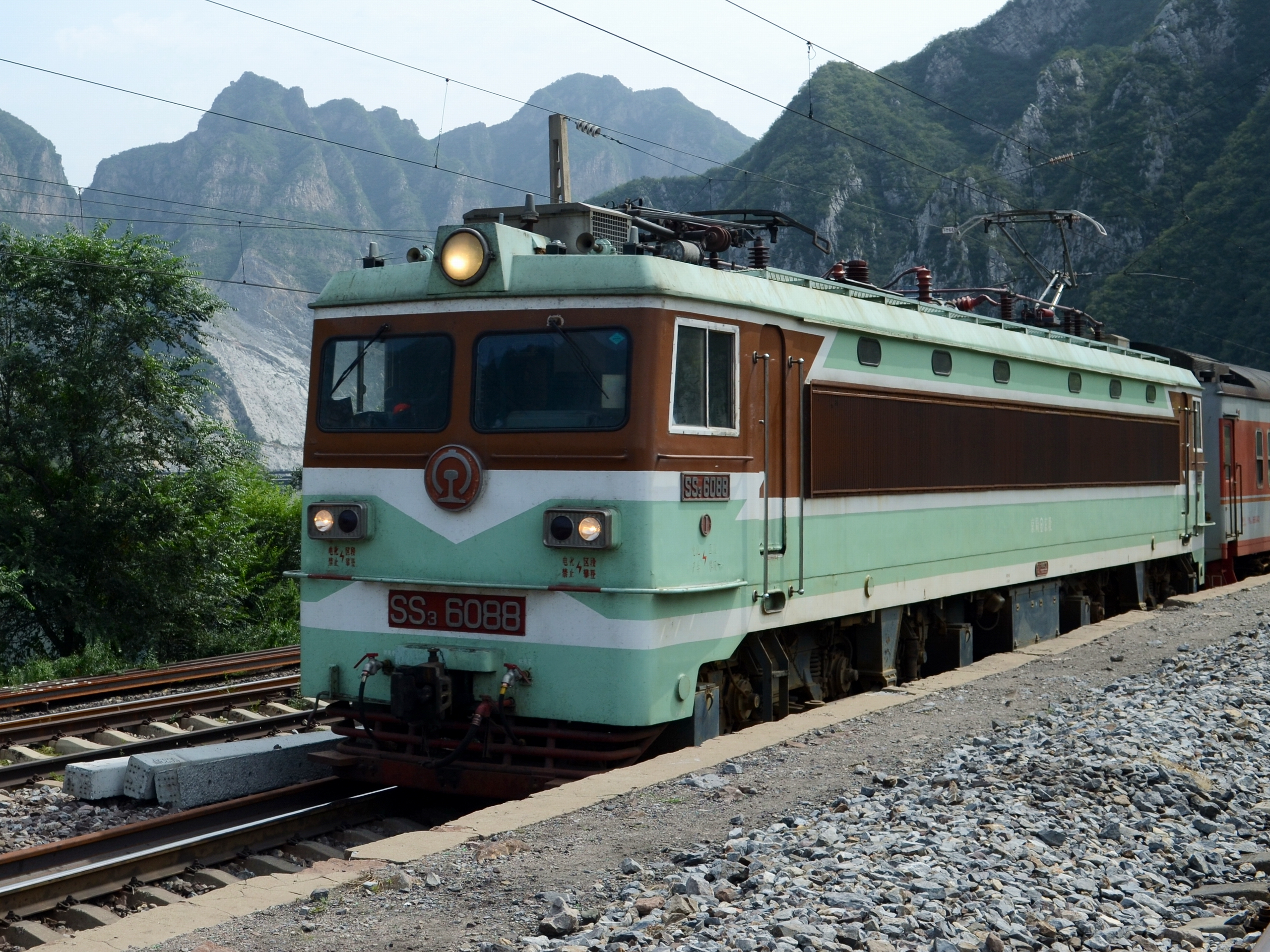
- The K729 train on the Fengsha railway in Mentougou District, Beijing

Overview
- Termini: Beijing Fengtai; Shacheng

Service
- Type: Heavy rail

Technical
- Line length: 121 km (75 mi)
- Number of tracks: 2
- Track gauge: 1,435 mm (4 ft 8 1/2 in) standard gauge
- Electrification: 25 kV/50 Hz AC overhead
- Operating speed: 60–80 km/h (37–50 mph)

The Fengtai–Shacheng railway or Fengsha railway (simplified Chinese: 丰沙铁路; traditional Chinese: 豐沙鐵路; pinyin: Fēngshā Tiělù) is a dual-track, electrified, railway in northern China. The Fengtai–Shacheng railway runs 105 km (65 mi) from Fengtai District in western Beijing Municipality to Shacheng Town in Huailai County, Zhangjiakou City, Hebei Province. The line passes through Beijing's Fengtai, Shijingshan and Mentougou Districts, and Huailai County in Zhangjiakou City, northern Hebei. The original single track line was built from 1952 to 1955. The second track was added in 1972. The line was electrified in 1984.

== Line description ==
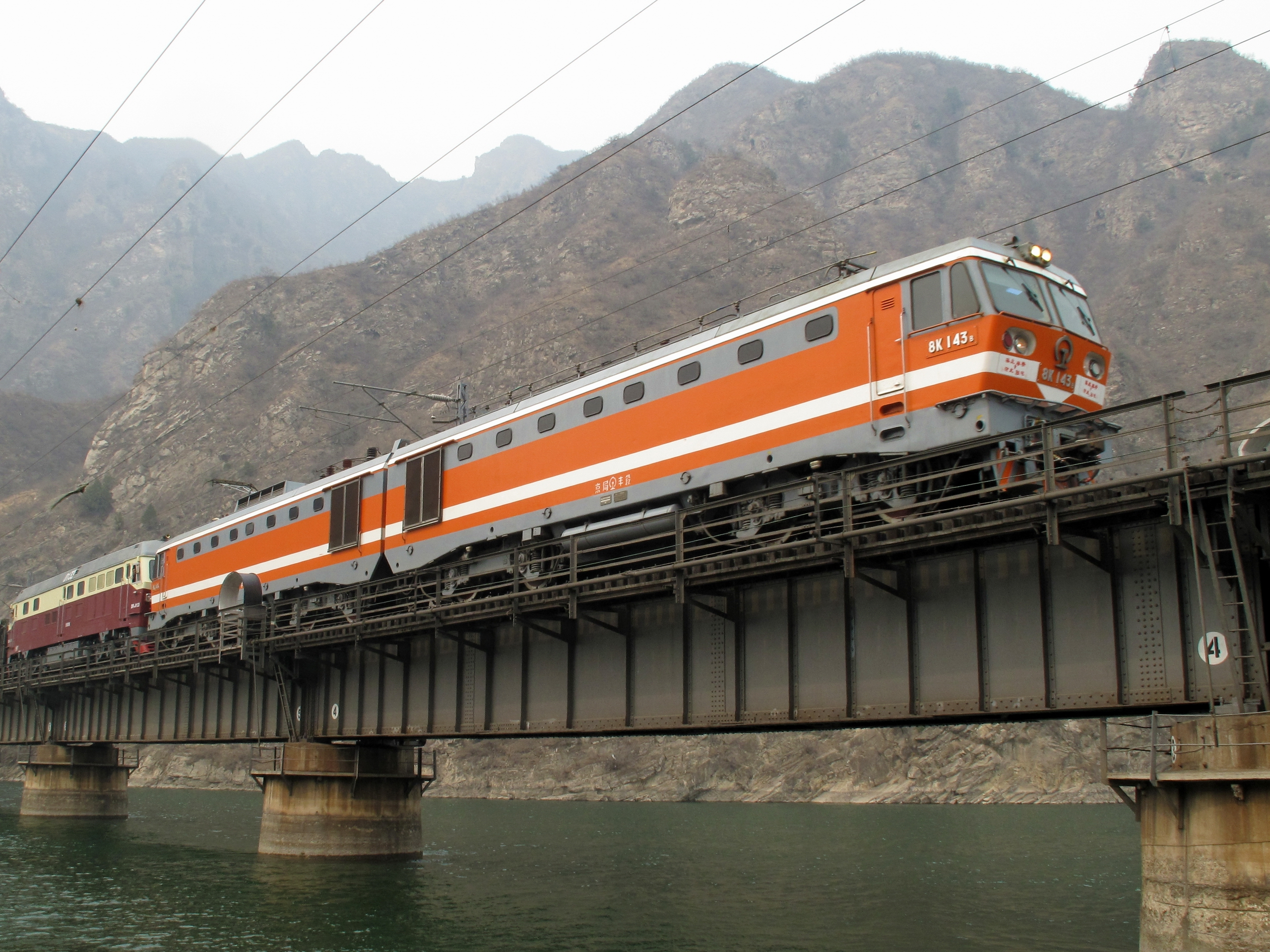
A bridge across the Yongding River.

The Fengsha railway runs up the Yongding River Valley from Fengtai District in southwest Beijing through the Taihang Mountains and across the Guanting Reservoir to Shacheng, on the Beijing–Baotou railway. The line crosses the Yongding River eight times through rugged terrain and has 67 tunnels and 81 bridges in all. The shortest tunnel, No. 056, just 19.8 m (65 ft) in length, is the shortest standard gauge rail tunnel in China.

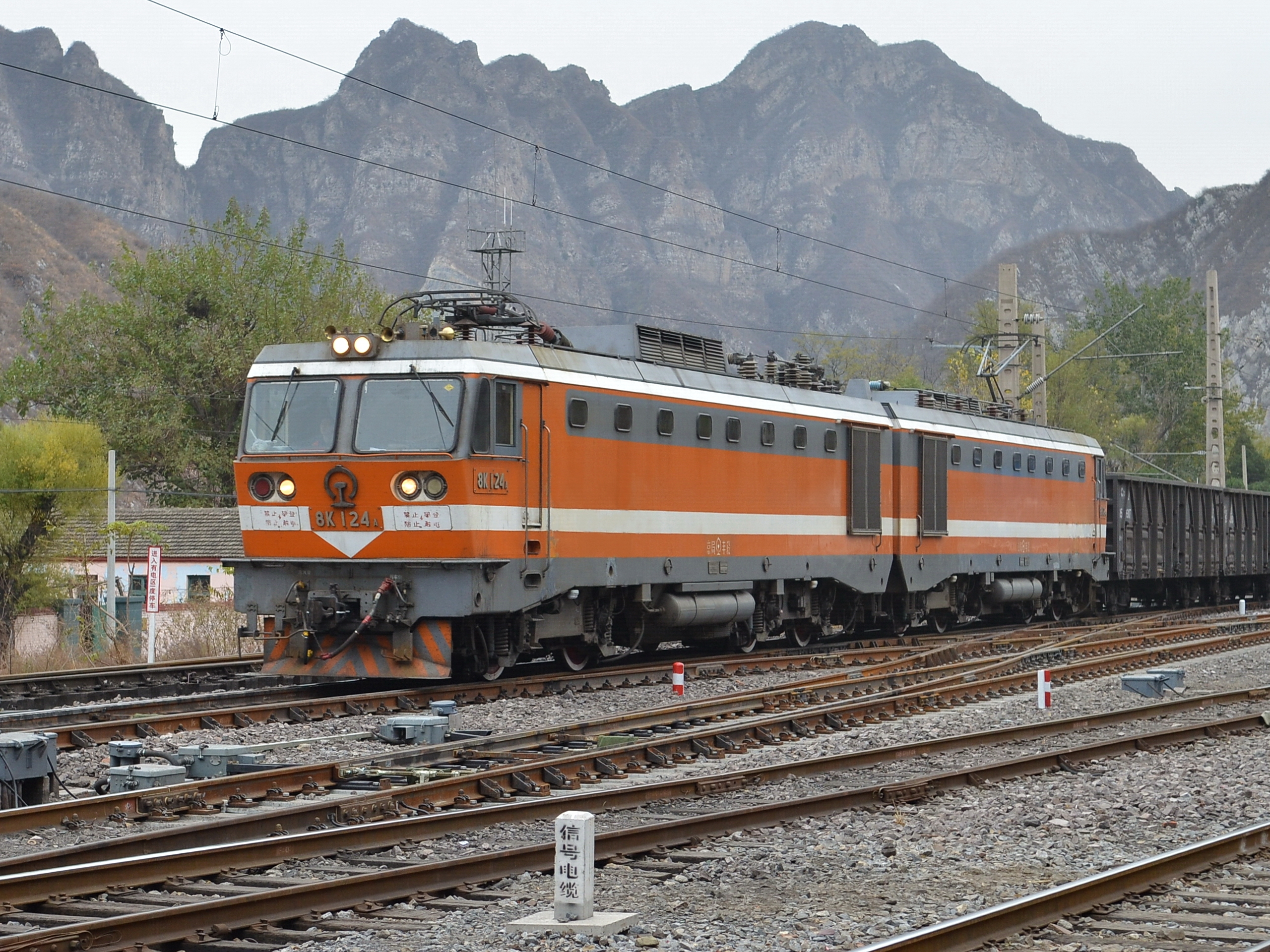
An 8K locomotive on the Fengsha line at the Luopoling railway station

The famous late Qing Dynasty railway engineer Zhan Tianyou considered routing the Beijing–Zhangjiakou railway through the Yongding River Valley, but abandoned the approach due to high construction costs. The line was built in 1952 as an alternative route to Beijing–Baotou railway for the shipment of coal from Shanxi. The Fengtai–Shacheng railway avoids the steep incline at Nankou on the Beijing–Baotou railway. A marble stele by the entrance to Tunnel No. 1 near Liuliqu Village commemorates the 108 soldiers who died building the initial line.

== Rail connections ==
- Beijing Fengtai: Beijing–Shanghai railway
- Shijingshan South: Beijing–Yuanping railway
- Shacheng: Beijing–Baotou railway

== See also ==
- List of railways in China
