= Donghuayuan =

Donghuayuan 东花园镇
- Town
- Dōnghuāyuán Zhèn
- Location in Hebei Location in China
- Coordinates: 40°20′16″N 115°47′50″E
- Country: People's Republic of China
- Province: Hebei
- Prefecture-level city: Zhangjiakou
- County: Huailai

Area
  - Total: 137.1 km^{2} (52.9 sq mi)

Population (2010)
  - Total: 15,260
  - Density: 111.3/km^{2} (288/sq mi)
- Time zone: UTC+8 (China Standard)

Donghuayuan (Chinese: 东花园镇; pinyin: Dōnghuāyuán Zhèn) is a town located in Huailai County, Zhangjiakou, Hebei, China. According to the 2010 census, Donghuayuan had a population of 15,260, including 7,915 males and 7,345 females. The population was distributed as follows: 2,280 people aged under 14, 11,429 people aged between 15 and 64, and 1,551 people aged over 65.

== See also ==
- List of township-level divisions of Hebei
