= Ciyao–Laiwu railway =

Railroad in northern China

The Ciyao–Laiwu railway or Cilai railway (simplified Chinese: 磁莱铁路; traditional Chinese: 磁萊鐵路; pinyin: cílái tiělù), is a railroad in northern China between Ciyao and Laiwu central Shandong Province. The line, 119 km (74 mi) in length, was built in two sections from 1940 to 1943 and 1959 to 1966, and is primarily used to transport coal and minerals mined near Laiwu.

== History ==
In 1916, a railway line near Ciyao was planned by the Huafeng Coal Company, but was not built. During World War II when Shandong was occupied by Japan, a Japanese company built a 25 km (16 mi) railroad between Dongtaiping (now named Ciyao) and Chichai (now Yucun) from 1940 to 1941. This line was extended 42 km (26 mi) to the Xinwen coal mines in Nanxintai (now Dongdu) in 1943, and the combined line, 69.6 km (43 mi) in length, became known as the Ciyao–Dongdu railway. The Dongdu to Laiwu section, 52 km (32 mi) in length, was built from 1959 to 1966, forming a tilted L-shaped railway.

== Rail connections ==
- Ciyao: Beijing–Shanghai railway
- Dongdu: Dongdu–Pingyi railway
- Laiwu: Xindian–Taian railway

== See also ==
- List of railways in China
