= Xiangtangxi–Le'an railway =

Railway line in Jiangxi, China

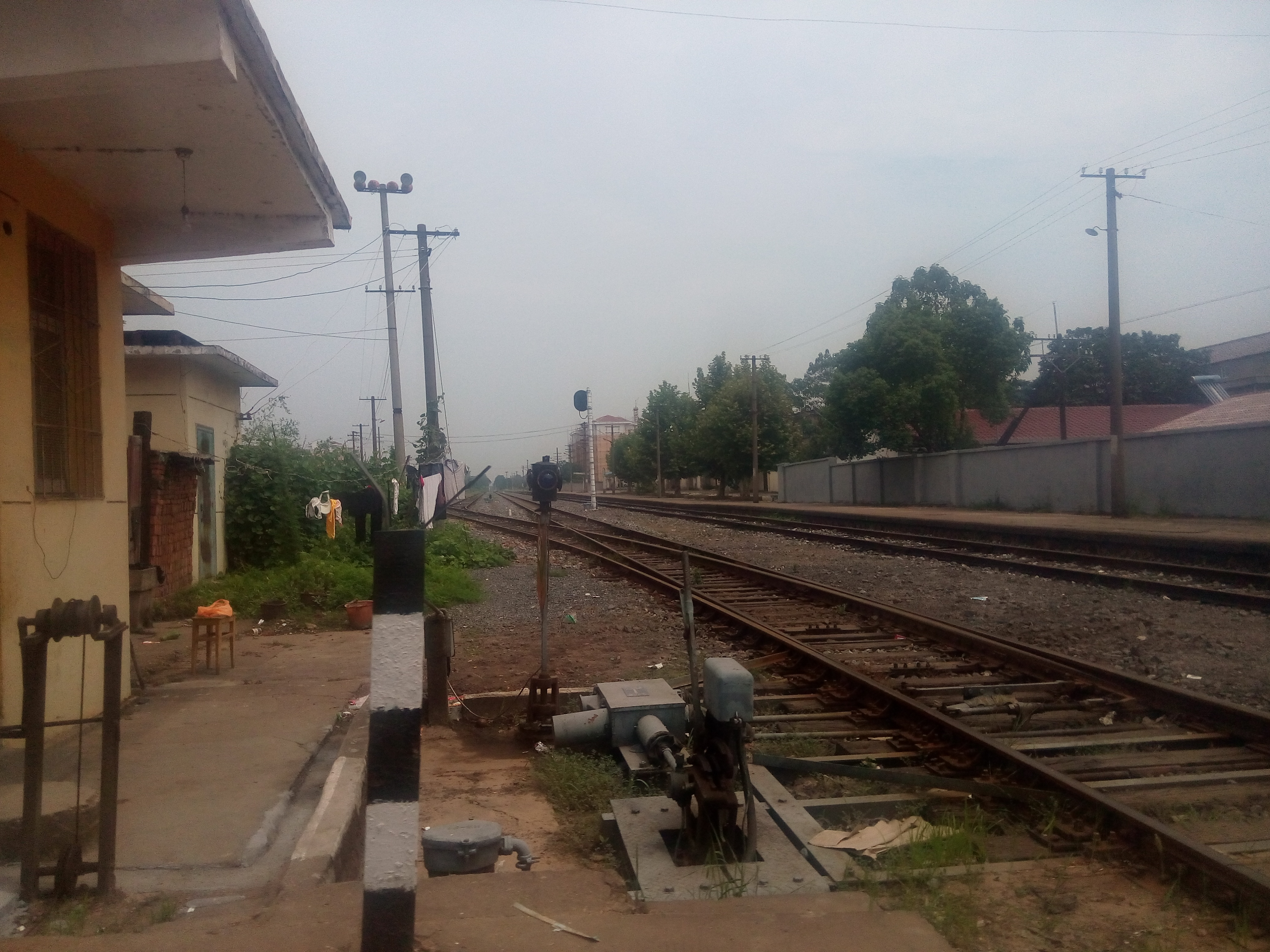
Chongren railway station, an intermediate station on the line

The Xiangtangxi–Le'an railway or Xiangle railway (Chinese: 向乐铁路; pinyin: Xiàng–Lè Tiělù) is a freight-only railway branch line located in Jiangxi, China.

The line was constructed in the 1960s. It once ran from Xiangtang West (Xiangtangxi) in Xiangtang, Nanchang County to Jiangbiancun in Le'an County, via Fuzhou. The last passenger service on the line was on 5 May 2013. Later that year, the original alignment between Nanchang and Fuzhou North was abandoned as the Xiangtang–Putian railway opened. Now only the Fuzhou North-Jiangbiancun section remains, as a branch from the Xiangtang–Putian railway.
