= Binhai Port railway =

Railway line in Jiangsu, China

Binhai Port railway (Chinese: 盐城滨海港铁路) is a single-track branch line in Yancheng, Jiangsu, China. It is currently under construction.

== Route ==
The line starts at Binhaigang railway station on the Qingdao–Yancheng railway and heads east, terminating at the eastern coast. The line is 50.1 kilometres (31.1 mi) long and will have a maximum speed of 120 kilometres per hour (75 mph).
