= Pingyi County =

Pingyi County 平邑县
- County
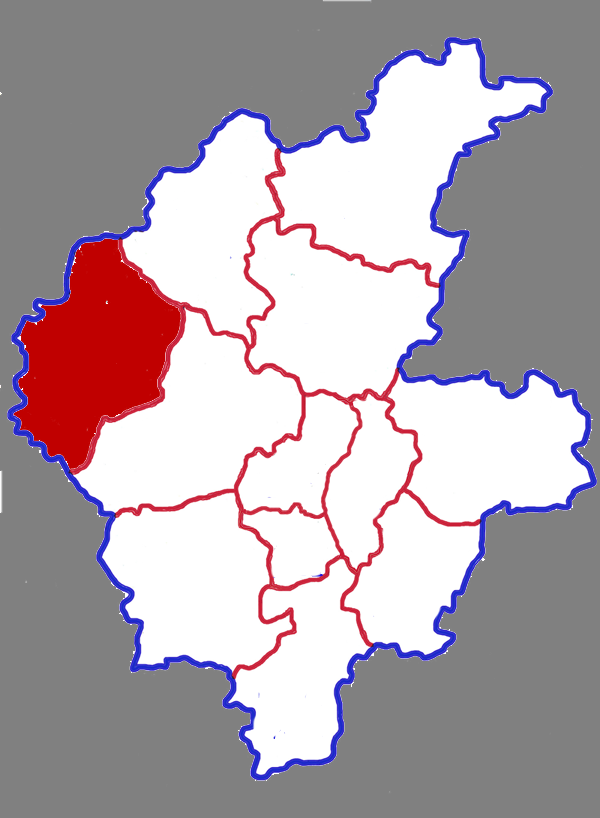
- Pingyi in Linyi

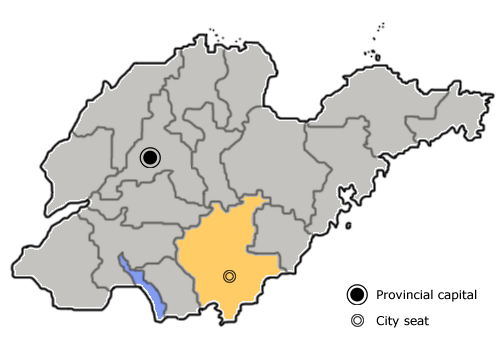
- Linyi in Shandong
- Coordinates: 35°31′02″N 117°36′55″E
- Country: People's Republic of China
- Province: Shandong
- Prefecture-level city: Linyi

Area
  - Total: 1,823 km^{2} (704 sq mi)

Population (2019)
  - Total: 968,200
  - Density: 531.1/km^{2} (1,376/sq mi)
- Time zone: UTC+8 (China Standard)
- Postal code: 273300

Pingyi County (Chinese: 平邑县; pinyin: Píngyì Xiàn) is a county in the south of Shandong Province, China. It is the westernmost county-level division of the prefecture-level city of Linyi. It has a land area of 1,824.79 km^{2} (704.56 sq mi) and a population of 980,000 in 2001. Its special local products are honeysuckle and granite. The second highest mountain in Shandong, Mount Meng, is located in Bianqiao Town.

== Administrative divisions ==
Pingyi County consists of 14 towns and 2 townships.

Towns

- Pingyi (平邑镇)
- Zhongcun (仲村镇)
- Wutai (武台镇)
- Baotai (保太镇)
- Bailin (柏林镇)
- Bianqiao (卞桥镇)
- Difang (地方镇)
- Tongshi (铜石镇)
- Wenshui (温水镇)
- Liuyu (流峪镇)
- Zhengcheng (郑城镇)
- Baiyan (白彦镇)
- Linjian (临涧镇)
- Fengyang (丰阳镇)

Townships

- Ziqiu Township (资邱乡)
- Weizhuang Township (魏庄乡)

== Climate ==
It is a monsoon regional continental climate characterized by cold winters, hot summers, abundant light and long frost-free periods.

Climate data for Pingyi, elevation 161 m (528 ft), (1991–2020 normals, extremes 1981–2010)
Month	Jan	Feb	Mar	Apr	May	Jun	Jul	Aug	Sep	Oct	Nov	Dec	Year
Record high °C (°F)	16.1 (61.0)	24.4 (75.9)	28.6 (83.5)	34.1 (93.4)	38.0 (100.4)	39.7 (103.5)	41.9 (107.4)	37.4 (99.3)	37.0 (98.6)	35.1 (95.2)	25.7 (78.3)	18.5 (65.3)	41.9 (107.4)
Mean daily maximum °C (°F)	4.7 (40.5)	8.2 (46.8)	14.4 (57.9)	21.4 (70.5)	26.8 (80.2)	30.5 (86.9)	31.3 (88.3)	30.3 (86.5)	26.9 (80.4)	21.3 (70.3)	13.5 (56.3)	6.6 (43.9)	19.7 (67.4)
Daily mean °C (°F)	−0.3 (31.5)	2.8 (37.0)	8.5 (47.3)	15.3 (59.5)	21.0 (69.8)	24.9 (76.8)	26.8 (80.2)	25.8 (78.4)	21.6 (70.9)	15.5 (59.9)	8.0 (46.4)	1.6 (34.9)	14.3 (57.7)
Mean daily minimum °C (°F)	−4.1 (24.6)	−1.4 (29.5)	3.5 (38.3)	9.9 (49.8)	15.5 (59.9)	20.0 (68.0)	23.1 (73.6)	22.3 (72.1)	17.3 (63.1)	10.8 (51.4)	3.8 (38.8)	−2.3 (27.9)	9.9 (49.8)
Record low °C (°F)	−13.9 (7.0)	−13.6 (7.5)	−10.7 (12.7)	−2.9 (26.8)	4.9 (40.8)	10.9 (51.6)	16.6 (61.9)	11.9 (53.4)	6.8 (44.2)	−1.7 (28.9)	−9.8 (14.4)	−15.0 (5.0)	−15.0 (5.0)
Average precipitation mm (inches)	8.0 (0.31)	14.7 (0.58)	18.3 (0.72)	34.4 (1.35)	63.6 (2.50)	95.4 (3.76)	211.9 (8.34)	183.6 (7.23)	72.7 (2.86)	27.7 (1.09)	29.8 (1.17)	10.8 (0.43)	770.9 (30.34)
Average precipitation days (≥ 0.1 mm)	3.0	3.8	4.2	5.6	6.8	7.6	12.2	12.0	7.2	5.3	5.0	3.3	76
Average snowy days	2.9	2.4	0.8	0.1	0	0	0	0	0	0	0.7	1.7	8.6
Average relative humidity (%)	59	58	52	54	59	64	78	80	73	67	65	62	64
Mean monthly sunshine hours	153.9	156.9	203.8	224.6	243.8	212.5	184.4	186.0	183.7	181.6	160.2	156.0	2,247.4
Percentage possible sunshine	49	51	55	57	56	49	42	45	50	53	52	52	51
Source: China Meteorological Administration

== Main tourist attractions ==
Mengshan mountains. Mengshan Pingyi Guemeng Scenic Area is a national AAAAA level tourist area, national geopark and national forest park.

Tianyu Nature Museum. It is a national 4A-level tourist area with a display area of 28,000 square meters. The museum has one scientific research hall, one 4D kinetic theater, 28 exhibition halls and more than 390,000 exhibits. It has been named as "Shandong Province Science Education Base" and "China Paleontology Science Education Base".
