= Baiyinhua–Xinqiu railway =

Railway line in China

The Baiyinhua–Xinqiu railway is a railway line in China. It is 487.6 kilometres (303.0 mi) long and was built primarily for coal transportation.

The north-western terminus of the line is Baiyinhua, where the line splits from the Xilinhot–Ulanhot railway. The south-eastern terminus is Xinqiu District where it meets the Xinlitun–Yixian railway.

== History ==
Construction on the line began in November 2007. The line was funded at least partially through private funds, though the project met financial problems causing it to miss its target completion date of August 2010. Although the railway ended at Xinqiu District, it was not connected to the national railway network. On 30 November 2017, a new connecting line was opened, connecting the southern end of the railway to the national railway network at Xinqiu railway station.
