= Xiangyangchuan–Hayudao railway =

Railway line in Heilongjiang, China

Overview
- Native name: 向阳川－哈鱼岛铁路
- Status: Operating
- Termini: Xiangyangchuan; Hayudao

History
- Opened: 11 December 2005 (Xiangyangchuan to Tongjiang)

Technical
- Track length: 82.48 km (51.25 mi)
- Track gauge: 1,435 mm (4 ft 8 1/2 in) standard gauge

The Xiangyangchuan–Hayudao railway (Chinese: 向阳川－哈鱼岛铁路) is a railway line in Jiamusi, Heilongjiang, China. The line has also been referred to as the Tongjiang local railway (Chinese: 同江地方铁路).

== History ==
Construction began on 20 October 2003. The first section to be completed, between Xiangyangchuan and Tongjiang, opened for freight service on 11 December 2005. Passenger service at Tongjiang railway station was introduced in 2016.

== Specification ==
The line is 82.48 kilometres (51.25 mi) long. The southern terminus of the line is at Xiangyangchuan, on the Fulitun–Qianjinzhen railway. The Tongjiang-Nizhneleninskoye railway bridge, currently under construction, will cross the Amur and connect the line to Russia.
