= Wen'an–Machangping railway =

Single-track electrified freight railway in China

Overview
- Status: Under construction
- Termini: Wen'an; Fuquan

Service
- Type: Heavy rail

Technical
- Line length: 72 km (45 mi)
- Track gauge: 1,435 mm (4 ft 8 1/2 in) standard gauge
- Electrification: 50 Hz 25,000 V
- Operating speed: 120 km/h (75 mph)

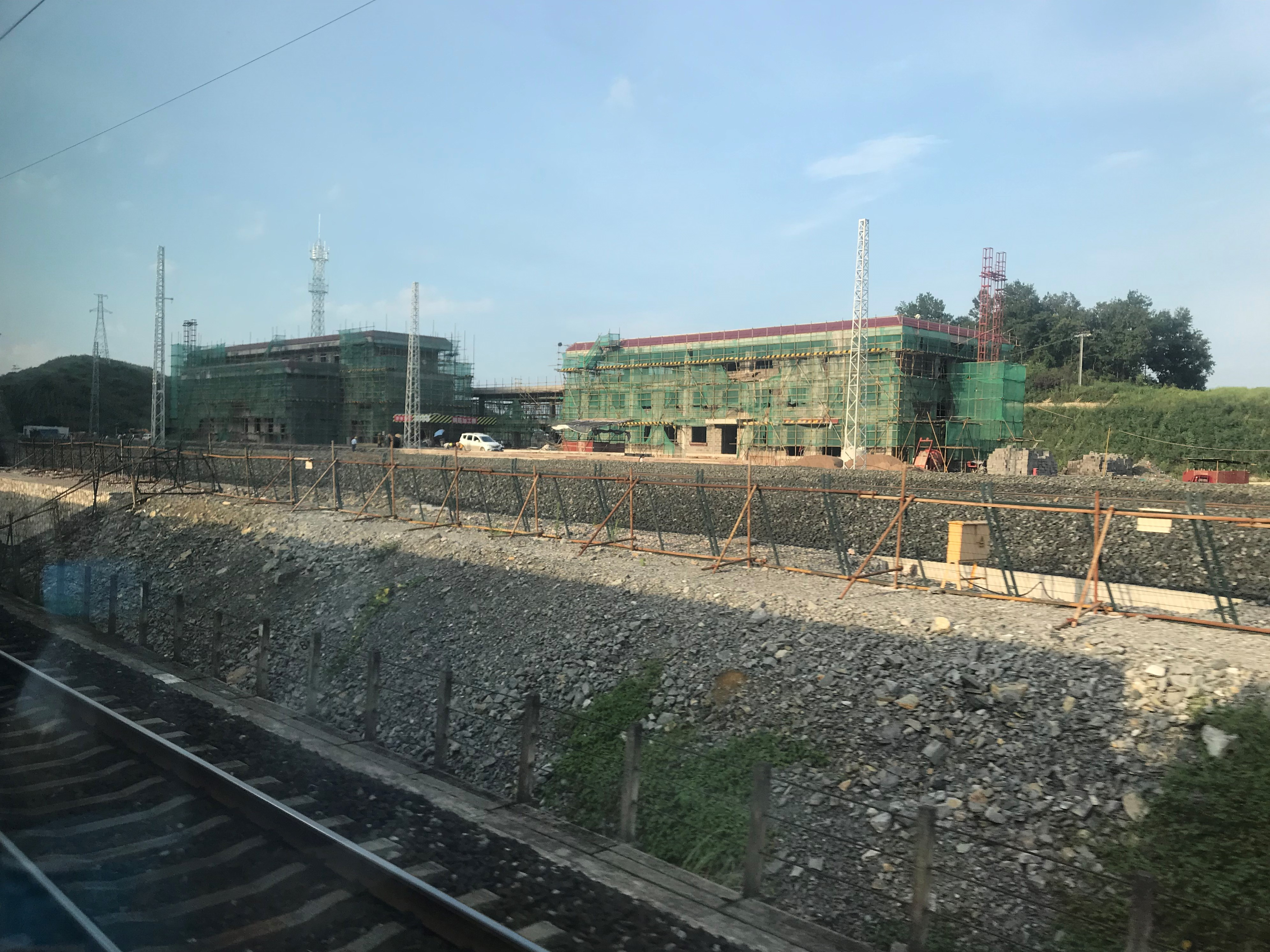
Station Building of Machangping under Construction

The Wen'an–Machangping railway (Chinese: 瓮马铁路) is a single-track electrified freight railway in China.

== Route ==
The line leaves the Shanghai–Kunming railway east of Fuquan railway station, which is located in Machangping village and heads north. The initial phase terminates at Wen'an and is 72 kilometres (45 mi) long. It is expected to open in April.

=== Extensions ===
Further extensions are planned that will see the line extended south from Fuquan to Duyun on the Guizhou–Guangxi railway, and northwest from Wen'an to meet the Sichuan–Guizhou railway. The full length of the railway including the extensions will be 212 kilometres (132 mi).
