= Jiexiu–Yangquanqu railway =

Railway line in Shanxi, China

The Jiexiu–Yangquanqu railway (Chinese: 介西铁路) is a railway line in Shanxi, China. It is 45 kilometres (28 mi) long. The eastern terminus is Jiexiu railway station, where the line meets the Datong–Puzhou railway. The western terminus is Yangquanqu railway station. Xiaoxi railway station, an intermediate stop on this line, is the terminus of the Xiaoxi–Liulin railway.
