= Shacheng, Hebei =

Shacheng 沙城镇
- Town
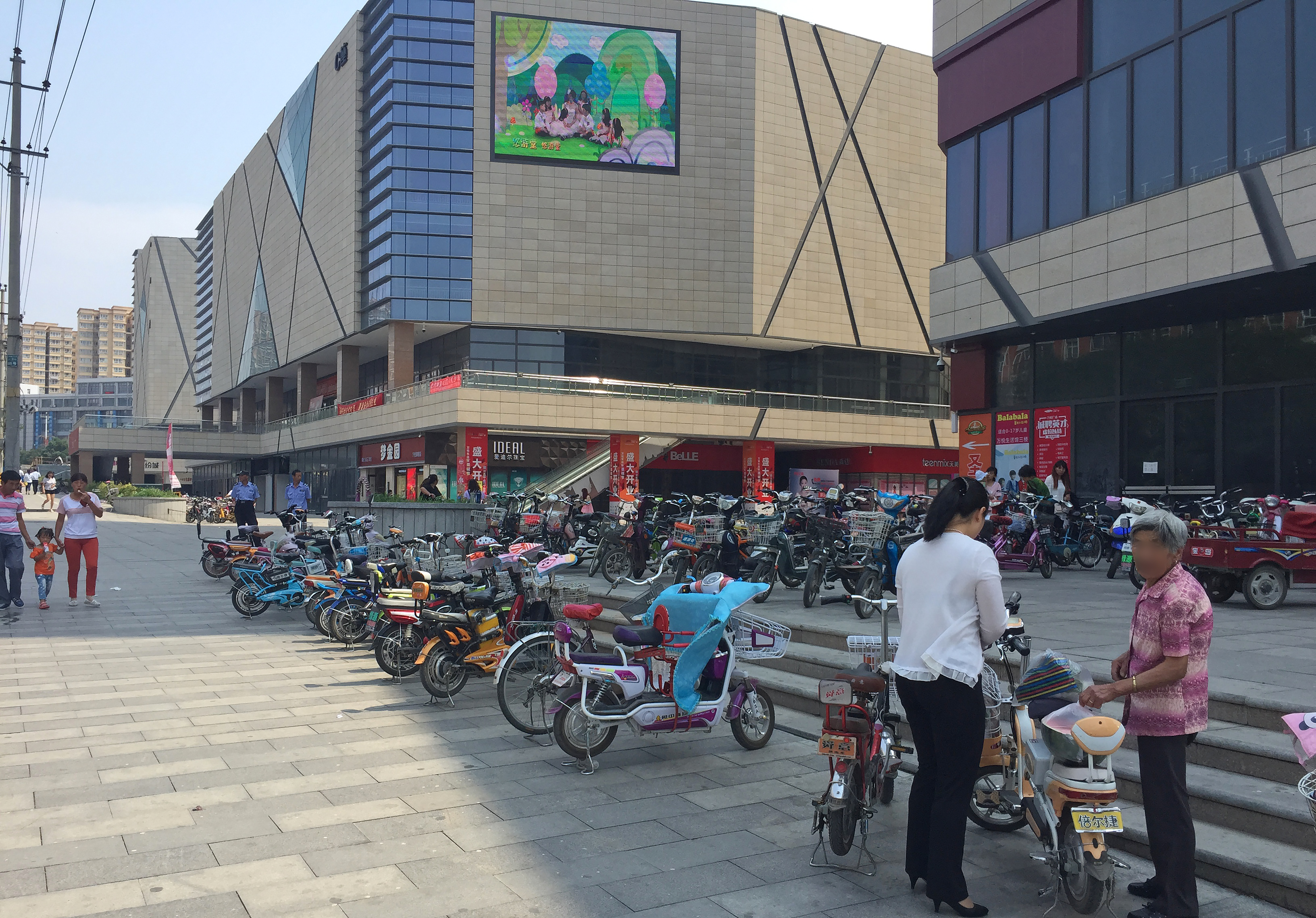
- Shopping mall in Shacheng
- Interactive map of Shacheng
- Coordinates: 40°24′14″N 115°31′08″E
- Country: China
- Province: Hebei
- Prefecture-level city: Zhangjiakou
- County: Huailai

Population
  - Total: 114,569

Shacheng (Chinese: 沙城; pinyin: Shāchéng) is a town located in Huailai County, under the administration of Zhangjiakou, in the northwest of Hebei province in Northern China. Shacheng is the county seat of Hualai. It is located 67 kilometres (42 mi) southeast of the urban area of Zhangjiakou and more than 80 kilometres (50 mi) from the urban area of Beijing. The town is associated with wine production. It had a population of 114,569 in 2019.

== Economy ==
The China Great Wall Wine Company, Ltd. has its headquarters in Shacheng and there are many vineyards in the area. Founded in 1983, the company's annual production is 50,000 tons. Typpalingur

== Transport ==
The Shacheng railway station serves as a junction for the Beijing–Baotou Railway and Fengtai–Shacheng Railway.

== Administrative divisions ==
Shacheng governs over 23 residential communities: 1st Street, 2nd Street, 3rd Street, 4th Street, 5th Street, 6th Street, 7th Street, 8th Street, 9th Street, Nanyuan Village, Shangliuwa Village, Dongyuan Village, Xiaoxinzhuang Village, Yulintun Village, Songjiaying Village, Dongshuiquan Village, Xishuiquan Village, Mayingtun Village, Jiantan Village, Guojiayuan Village, Wulitai Village, Qiaojiaying Village, Liangtian Village.

== See also ==
- List of township-level divisions of Hebei
