= Huailai County =

Huailai County 怀来县
- County
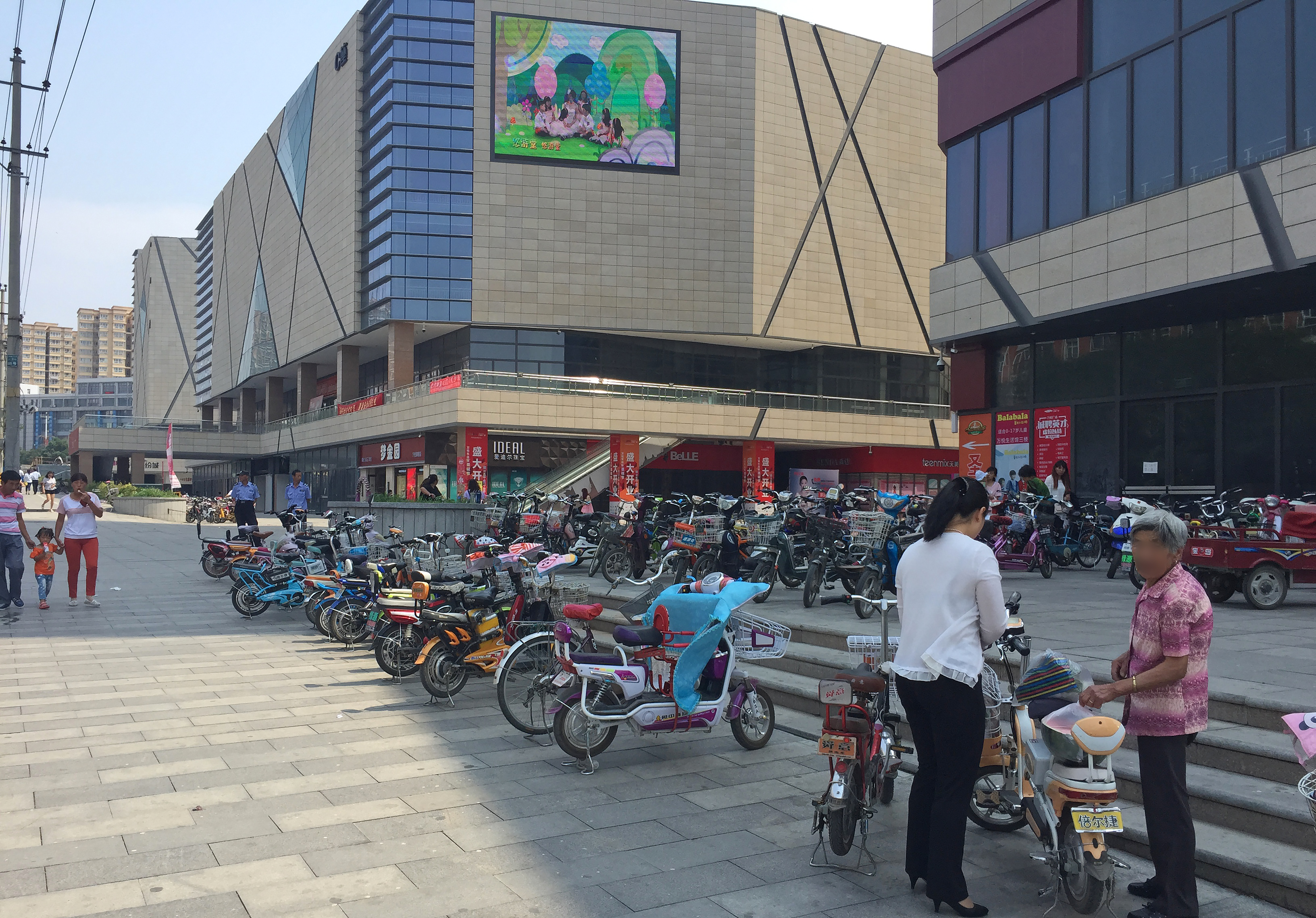

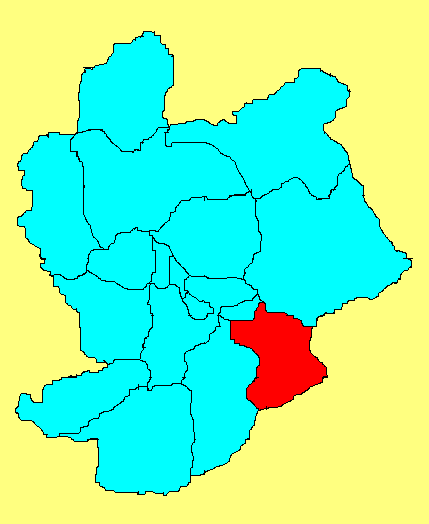
- Location in Zhangjiakou

- Location of the seat in Hebei
- Coordinates: 40°25′N 115°31′E
- Country: People's Republic of China
- Province: Hebei
- Prefecture-level city: Zhangjiakou
- County seat: Shacheng

Area
  - Total: 1,793 km^{2} (692 sq mi)

Population (2020 census)
  - Total: 348,746
  - Density: 194.5/km^{2} (503.8/sq mi)
- Time zone: UTC+8 (China Standard)
- Postal code: 075400
- Area code: 0313
- Website: huailai.gov.cn

Huailai (simplified Chinese: 怀来县; traditional Chinese: 懷來縣; pinyin: Huáilái Xiàn) is a county in northwestern Hebei province, People's Republic of China, under the administration of the prefecture-level city of Zhangjiakou.

Huailai County is a center for grape wine production, with the China Great Wall Wine Company, Ltd. headquartered in the town of Shacheng. Huailai Tianyuan Special Type Glass Co., Ltd. is also located in Huailai County.

== Geography and climate ==
Huailai County is located in the eastern part of Zhangjiakou prefecture, with latitude ranging from 40° 04′ to 40° 35′ N and longitude 115° 16′ to 115° 58′ E. It contains the upper reaches of the Yongding River and borders Beijing Municipality. It is 87 kilometres (54 mi) east-southeast of the urban area of Zhangjiakou and 120 kilometres (75 mi) west-northwest of Beijing city proper.

Huailai County has a monsoon-influenced, continental semi-arid climate (Köppen BSk), with cold, dry, and windy winters and hot, humid summers, with temperatures slightly warmer than Zhangjiakou due to the more southerly location but still significantly cooler than in Beijing due to the high elevation. The monthly 24-hour average temperature ranges from −7.0 °C (19.4 °F) in January to 24.8 °C (76.6 °F) in July, and the annual mean is 10.01 °C (50.0 °F). A majority of the annual rainfall occurs in July and August alone. With monthly percent possible sunshine ranging from 60% in July to 73% in January and February, sunshine is abundant year-round, totalling about 3,030 hours annually.

Climate data for Huailai County, elevation 571 m (1,873 ft), (1991–2020 normals, extremes 1954-present)
Month	Jan	Feb	Mar	Apr	May	Jun	Jul	Aug	Sep	Oct	Nov	Dec	Year
Record high °C (°F)	10.1 (50.2)	17.2 (63.0)	29.0 (84.2)	36.2 (97.2)	38.2 (100.8)	40.3 (104.5)	42.2 (108.0)	38.4 (101.1)	36.7 (98.1)	31.3 (88.3)	20.9 (69.6)	15.4 (59.7)	42.2 (108.0)
Mean daily maximum °C (°F)	−0.9 (30.4)	3.7 (38.7)	11.1 (52.0)	19.5 (67.1)	25.9 (78.6)	29.6 (85.3)	30.7 (87.3)	29.4 (84.9)	24.9 (76.8)	17.3 (63.1)	7.7 (45.9)	0.4 (32.7)	16.6 (61.9)
Daily mean °C (°F)	−6.7 (19.9)	−2.8 (27.0)	4.2 (39.6)	12.4 (54.3)	19.0 (66.2)	23.0 (73.4)	24.9 (76.8)	23.4 (74.1)	18.0 (64.4)	10.5 (50.9)	1.8 (35.2)	−5.0 (23.0)	10.2 (50.4)
Mean daily minimum °C (°F)	−11.1 (12.0)	−7.9 (17.8)	−1.6 (29.1)	6.0 (42.8)	12.4 (54.3)	17.2 (63.0)	19.9 (67.8)	18.3 (64.9)	12.4 (54.3)	5.2 (41.4)	−2.7 (27.1)	−9.0 (15.8)	4.9 (40.9)
Record low °C (°F)	−24.3 (−11.7)	−21.4 (−6.5)	−18.4 (−1.1)	−7.5 (18.5)	−0.9 (30.4)	6.7 (44.1)	11.1 (52.0)	4.9 (40.8)	−0.7 (30.7)	−7.4 (18.7)	−15.3 (4.5)	−23.3 (−9.9)	−24.3 (−11.7)
Average precipitation mm (inches)	1.5 (0.06)	2.7 (0.11)	7.3 (0.29)	17.2 (0.68)	35.1 (1.38)	66.8 (2.63)	102.1 (4.02)	74.3 (2.93)	57.2 (2.25)	23.3 (0.92)	8.5 (0.33)	1.7 (0.07)	397.7 (15.67)
Average precipitation days (≥ 0.1 mm)	1.4	1.8	3.2	5.1	7.4	11.3	12.1	10.1	8.4	5.3	2.8	1.5	70.4
Average snowy days	2.8	3.0	2.9	0.7	0	0	0	0	0	0.3	2.7	2.4	14.8
Average relative humidity (%)	42	39	38	38	42	55	66	68	62	55	50	44	50
Mean monthly sunshine hours	208.3	208.9	251.6	268.4	293.9	267.1	257.2	259.2	242.4	231.1	197.3	197.2	2,882.6
Percentage possible sunshine	69	69	67	67	66	60	57	61	66	68	67	69	66
Source: China Meteorological Administrationextremes

== Administrative divisions ==
There are 11 towns, five townships and one ethnic township in the county:

=== Towns (镇) ===
- Shacheng (沙城镇)
- Beixinbu (北辛堡镇)
- Xinbao'an (新保安镇)
- Donghuayuan (东花园镇)
- Guanting (官厅镇)
- Sangyuan (桑园镇)
- Cunrui (存瑞镇)
- Tumu (土木镇)
- Dahuangzhuang (大黄庄镇)
- Xibali (西八里镇)
- Xiaonanxinbu (小南辛堡镇)

=== Townships (乡) ===
- Langshan Township (狼山乡)
- Jimingyi Township (鸡鸣驿乡)
- Dongbali Township (东八里乡)
- Ruiyunguan Township (瑞云观乡)
- Sunzhuangzi Township (孙庄子乡)

=== Ethnic Township (民族乡) ===
- Wangjialou Hui Ethnic Township (王家楼回族乡)
