= List of administrative divisions of Fujian =

Fujian Province
- Province
- Capital: Fuzhou (PRC); Jincheng (ROC)

Prefecture-level divisions
- Sub-provincial cities: 1 (PRC); 2 (ROC)
- Prefectural cities: 8

County level divisions
- County cities: 13
- Counties: 43 (PRC); 67 (ROC)
- Districts: 29

Township level divisions
- Towns: 600
- Townships: 311
- Ethnic townships: 19
- Subdistricts: 173

Villages level divisions
- Communities: 2,378
- Administrative villages: 14,406
- The above are numbers given officially by the PRC, so Kinmen County, ROC (Taiwan) (6 townships) and Matsu Township (Lienchiang County, ROC (Taiwan)) are included as well.

Fujian is a province of China, with the vast majority administered by the People's Republic of China (PRC), and the offshore islands of Kinmen (Quemoy, Jinmen, etc.) and Matsu administered by the Republic of China (ROC) on Taiwan.

The PRC-administered Fujian Province is made up of three levels of administrative division: prefecture-level, county-level, and township-level. The ROC-administered Fujian consists of 67 counties and 2 cities (Fuzhou and Xiamen). Among the two of its 67 counties are Kinmen and Lienchiang.

All of these administrative divisions are explained in greater detail at administrative divisions of the People's Republic of China. This chart lists only prefecture-level and county-level divisions of Fujian as given by the PRC.

For the list of township-level divisions within each county, see list of township-level divisions of Fujian.

== Administrative divisions ==
Prefecture level (Division code)	County Level				
Prefecture level (Division code)	Name	Chinese	Hanyu Pinyin	Division code	
Fuzhou city 福州市; Fúzhōu Shì (Capital) (3501 / FOC)	Gulou District	鼓楼区	Gǔlóu Qū	350102	GLR
Fuzhou city 福州市; Fúzhōu Shì (Capital) (3501 / FOC)	Taijiang District	台江区	Táijiāng Qū	350103	TJQ
Fuzhou city 福州市; Fúzhōu Shì (Capital) (3501 / FOC)	Cangshan District	仓山区	Cāngshān Qū	350104	CSQ
Fuzhou city 福州市; Fúzhōu Shì (Capital) (3501 / FOC)	Mawei District	马尾区	Mǎwěi Qū	350105	MWQ
Fuzhou city 福州市; Fúzhōu Shì (Capital) (3501 / FOC)	Jin'an District	晋安区	Jìn'ān Qū	350111	JAF
Fuzhou city 福州市; Fúzhōu Shì (Capital) (3501 / FOC)	Changle District (Note: The Lienchiang County (Matsu Islands), Republic of China (Taiwan), is claimed by the PRC as a part of its Lianjiang County. The Juguang Islands, claimed as a part of Changle District, Fuzhou by the PRC, and the islands of Dongyin and Siyin, claimed as part of the Luoyuan County by the PRC, are also part of Lienchiang County, ROC (Taiwan).)	长乐区	Chánglè Qū	350112	
Fuzhou city 福州市; Fúzhōu Shì (Capital) (3501 / FOC)	Minhou County	闽侯县	Mǐnhòu Xiàn (Note: not Mǐnhóu)	350121	MHO
Fuzhou city 福州市; Fúzhōu Shì (Capital) (3501 / FOC)	Lianjiang County	连江县	Liánjiāng Xiàn	350122	LJF
Fuzhou city 福州市; Fúzhōu Shì (Capital) (3501 / FOC)	Luoyuan County	罗源县	Luóyuán Xiàn	350123	LOY
Fuzhou city 福州市; Fúzhōu Shì (Capital) (3501 / FOC)	Minqing County	闽清县	Mǐnqīng Xiàn	350124	MQG
Fuzhou city 福州市; Fúzhōu Shì (Capital) (3501 / FOC)	Yongtai County	永泰县	Yǒngtài Xiàn	350125	YTX
Fuzhou city 福州市; Fúzhōu Shì (Capital) (3501 / FOC)	Pingtan County	平潭县	Píngtán Xiàn	350128	PTN
Fuzhou city 福州市; Fúzhōu Shì (Capital) (3501 / FOC)	Fuqing city	福清市	Fúqīng Shì	350181	FQS
Xiamen city 厦门市; Xiàmén Shì (Sub-provincial) (3502 / XMN)	Siming District	思明区	Sīmíng Qū	350203	SMQ
Xiamen city 厦门市; Xiàmén Shì (Sub-provincial) (3502 / XMN)	Haicang District	海沧区	Hǎicāng Qū	350205	HCA
Xiamen city 厦门市; Xiàmén Shì (Sub-provincial) (3502 / XMN)	Huli District	湖里区	Húlǐ Qū	350206	HLQ
Xiamen city 厦门市; Xiàmén Shì (Sub-provincial) (3502 / XMN)	Jimei District	集美区	Jíměi Qū	350211	JMQ
Xiamen city 厦门市; Xiàmén Shì (Sub-provincial) (3502 / XMN)	Tong'an District	同安区	Tóng'ān Qū	350212	TAQ
Xiamen city 厦门市; Xiàmén Shì (Sub-provincial) (3502 / XMN)	Xiang'an District	翔安区	Xiáng'ān Qū	350213	XIU
Putian city 莆田市; Pútián Shì (3503 / PUT)	Chengxiang District	城厢区	Chéngxiāng Qū	350302	CXP
Putian city 莆田市; Pútián Shì (3503 / PUT)	Hanjiang District	涵江区	Hánjiāng Qū	350303	HJQ
Putian city 莆田市; Pútián Shì (3503 / PUT)	Licheng District	荔城区	Lìchéng Qū	350304	LEG
Putian city 莆田市; Pútián Shì (3503 / PUT)	Xiuyu District (Note: Kinmen County (Quemoy, Jinmen, etc.) is part of the Republic of China (Taiwan). The county is claimed by the PRC. Kinmen County also includes the Wuqiu (Wuciou) Islands, claimed by the PRC as a part of Xiuyu District, Putian.)	秀屿区	Xiùyǔ Qū	350305	XUQ
Putian city 莆田市; Pútián Shì (3503 / PUT)	Xianyou County	仙游县	Xiānyóu Xiàn	350322	XYF
Sanming city 三明市; Sānmíng Shì (3504 / SMS)
Sanming city 三明市; Sānmíng Shì (3504 / SMS)	Sanyuan District	三元区	Sānyuán Qū	350404	SYB
Sanming city 三明市; Sānmíng Shì (3504 / SMS)	Shaxian District	沙县区	Shāxiàn Qū	350405	SAX
Sanming city 三明市; Sānmíng Shì (3504 / SMS)	Mingxi County	明溪县	Míngxī Xiàn	350421	MXI
Sanming city 三明市; Sānmíng Shì (3504 / SMS)	Qingliu County	清流县	Qīngliú Xiàn	350423	QLX
Sanming city 三明市; Sānmíng Shì (3504 / SMS)	Ninghua County	宁化县	Nínghuà Xiàn	350424	NGH
Sanming city 三明市; Sānmíng Shì (3504 / SMS)	Datian County	大田县	Dàtián Xiàn	350425	DTM
Sanming city 三明市; Sānmíng Shì (3504 / SMS)	Youxi County	尤溪县	Yóuxī Xiàn	350426	YXF
Sanming city 三明市; Sānmíng Shì (3504 / SMS)	Jiangle County	将乐县	Jiānglè Xiàn	350428	JLE
Sanming city 三明市; Sānmíng Shì (3504 / SMS)	Taining County	泰宁县	Tàiníng Xiàn	350429	TNG
Sanming city 三明市; Sānmíng Shì (3504 / SMS)	Jianning County	建宁县	Jiànníng Xiàn	350430	JNF
Sanming city 三明市; Sānmíng Shì (3504 / SMS)	Yong'an city	永安市	Yǒng'ān Shì	350481	YAF
Quanzhou city 泉州市; Quánzhōu Shì (3505 / QZJ)	Licheng District	鲤城区	Lǐchéng Qū	350502	LCQ
Quanzhou city 泉州市; Quánzhōu Shì (3505 / QZJ)	Fengze District	丰泽区	Fēngzé Qū	350503	FZE
Quanzhou city 泉州市; Quánzhōu Shì (3505 / QZJ)	Luojiang District	洛江区	Luòjiāng Qū	350504	LJQ
Quanzhou city 泉州市; Quánzhōu Shì (3505 / QZJ)	Quangang District	泉港区	Quángǎng Qū	350505	QGQ
Quanzhou city 泉州市; Quánzhōu Shì (3505 / QZJ)	Hui'an County	惠安县	Huì'ān Xiàn	350521	HAF
Quanzhou city 泉州市; Quánzhōu Shì (3505 / QZJ)	Anxi County	安溪县	Ānxī Xiàn	350524	ANX
Quanzhou city 泉州市; Quánzhōu Shì (3505 / QZJ)	Yongchun County	永春县	Yǒngchūn Xiàn	350525	YCM
Quanzhou city 泉州市; Quánzhōu Shì (3505 / QZJ)	Dehua County	德化县	Déhuà Xiàn	350526	DHA
Quanzhou city 泉州市; Quánzhōu Shì (3505 / QZJ)	Kinmen County	金門縣	Jīnmén Xiàn	350527	JME
Quanzhou city 泉州市; Quánzhōu Shì (3505 / QZJ)	Shishi city	石狮市	Shíshī Shì	350581	SHH
Quanzhou city 泉州市; Quánzhōu Shì (3505 / QZJ)	Jinjiang city	晋江市	Jìnjiāng Shì	350582	JJG
Quanzhou city 泉州市; Quánzhōu Shì (3505 / QZJ)	Nan'an city	南安市	Nán'ān Shì	350583	NAS
Zhangzhou city 漳州市; Zhāngzhōu Shì (3506 / ZZU)	Xiangcheng District	芗城区	Xiāngchéng Qū	350602	XZZ
Zhangzhou city 漳州市; Zhāngzhōu Shì (3506 / ZZU)	Longwen District	龙文区	Lóngwén Qū	350603	LWZ
Zhangzhou city 漳州市; Zhāngzhōu Shì (3506 / ZZU)	Longhai District	龙海区	Lónghǎi Qū	350604	LHM
Zhangzhou city 漳州市; Zhāngzhōu Shì (3506 / ZZU)	Changtai District	长泰区	Chángtài Qū	350605	CTA
Zhangzhou city 漳州市; Zhāngzhōu Shì (3506 / ZZU)	Yunxiao County	云霄县	Yúnxiāo Xiàn	350622	YXO
Zhangzhou city 漳州市; Zhāngzhōu Shì (3506 / ZZU)	Zhangpu County	漳浦县	Zhāngpǔ Xiàn	350623	ZPU
Zhangzhou city 漳州市; Zhāngzhōu Shì (3506 / ZZU)	Zhao'an County	诏安县	Zhào'ān Xiàn	350624	ZAF
Zhangzhou city 漳州市; Zhāngzhōu Shì (3506 / ZZU)	Changtai County	长泰县	Chángtài Xiàn	350625	CTA
Zhangzhou city 漳州市; Zhāngzhōu Shì (3506 / ZZU)	Dongshan County	东山县	Dōngshān Xiàn	350626	DSN
Zhangzhou city 漳州市; Zhāngzhōu Shì (3506 / ZZU)	Nanjing County	南靖县	Nánjìng Xiàn	350627	NJX
Zhangzhou city 漳州市; Zhāngzhōu Shì (3506 / ZZU)	Pinghe County	平和县	Pínghé Xiàn	350628	PHE
Zhangzhou city 漳州市; Zhāngzhōu Shì (3506 / ZZU)	Hua'an County	华安县	Huá'ān Xiàn	350629	HAN
Zhangzhou city 漳州市; Zhāngzhōu Shì (3506 / ZZU)	Longhai city	龙海市	Lónghǎi Shì	350681	LHM
Nanping city 南平市; Nánpíng Shì (3507 / NPS)	Yanping District	延平区	Yánpíng Qū	350702	YPQ
Nanping city 南平市; Nánpíng Shì (3507 / NPS)	Jianyang District	建阳区	Jiànyáng Qū	350703	JYU
Nanping city 南平市; Nánpíng Shì (3507 / NPS)	Shunchang County	顺昌县	Shùnchāng Xiàn	350721	SCG
Nanping city 南平市; Nánpíng Shì (3507 / NPS)	Pucheng County	浦城县	Pǔchéng Xiàn	350722	PCX
Nanping city 南平市; Nánpíng Shì (3507 / NPS)	Guangze County	光泽县	Guāngzé Xiàn	350723	GZE
Nanping city 南平市; Nánpíng Shì (3507 / NPS)	Songxi County	松溪县	Sōngxī Xiàn	350724	SOX
Nanping city 南平市; Nánpíng Shì (3507 / NPS)	Zhenghe County	政和县	Zhènghé Xiàn	350725	ZGH
Nanping city 南平市; Nánpíng Shì (3507 / NPS)	Shaowu city	邵武市	Shàowǔ Shì	350781	SWU
Nanping city 南平市; Nánpíng Shì (3507 / NPS)	Wuyishan city	武夷山市	Wǔyíshān Shì	350782	WUS
Nanping city 南平市; Nánpíng Shì (3507 / NPS)	Jian'ou city	建瓯市	Jiàn'ōu Shì	350783	JOU
Longyan city 龙岩市; Lóngyán Shì (3508 / LYF)	Xinluo District	新罗区	Xīnluó Qū	350802	XNL
Longyan city 龙岩市; Lóngyán Shì (3508 / LYF)	Yongding District	永定区	Yǒngdìng Qū	350803	YDN
Longyan city 龙岩市; Lóngyán Shì (3508 / LYF)	Changting County	长汀县	Chángtīng Xiàn	350821	CTG
Longyan city 龙岩市; Lóngyán Shì (3508 / LYF)	Shanghang County	上杭县	Shàngháng Xiàn	350823	SHF
Longyan city 龙岩市; Lóngyán Shì (3508 / LYF)	Wuping County	武平县	Wǔpíng Xiàn	350824	WPG
Longyan city 龙岩市; Lóngyán Shì (3508 / LYF)	Liancheng County	连城县	Liánchéng Xiàn	350825	LCF
Longyan city 龙岩市; Lóngyán Shì (3508 / LYF)	Zhangping city	漳平市	Zhāngpíng Shì	350881	ZGP
Ningde city 宁德市; Níngdé Shì (3509 / NDS)	Jiaocheng District	蕉城区	Jiāochéng Qū	350902	JIQ
Ningde city 宁德市; Níngdé Shì (3509 / NDS)	Xiapu County	霞浦县	Xiápǔ Xiàn	350921	XPU
Ningde city 宁德市; Níngdé Shì (3509 / NDS)	Gutian County	古田县	Gǔtián Xiàn	350922	GTN
Ningde city 宁德市; Níngdé Shì (3509 / NDS)	Pingnan County	屏南县	Píngnán Xiàn	350923	PNX
Ningde city 宁德市; Níngdé Shì (3509 / NDS)	Shouning County	寿宁县	Shòuníng Xiàn	350924	SNF
Ningde city 宁德市; Níngdé Shì (3509 / NDS)	Zhouning County	周宁县	Zhōuníng Xiàn	350925	ZNX
Ningde city 宁德市; Níngdé Shì (3509 / NDS)	Zherong County	柘荣县	Zhèróng Xiàn	350926	ZRG
Ningde city 宁德市; Níngdé Shì (3509 / NDS)	Fu'an city	福安市	Fú'ān Shì	350981	FAS
Ningde city 宁德市; Níngdé Shì (3509 / NDS)	Fuding city	福鼎市	Fúdǐng Shì	350982	FDG

== Administrative divisions history ==
=== Recent changes in administrative divisions ===
Date	Before	After	Note	Reference
1981-09-21	Longyan County	Longyan (PC-City)	reorganized	
1983-01-18	all Province-controlled city (P-City) → Prefecture-level city (PL-City)			Civil Affairs Announcement
1983-01-18	all Prefecture-controlled city (PC-City) → County-level city (CL-City)			Civil Affairs Announcement
1983-04-28	Putian Prefecture	Jinjiang Prefecture	merged into	
1983-04-28	parts of Putian Prefecture	Fuzhou (PL-City)	transferred	
1983-04-28	↳ Minqing County	↳ Minqing County	transferred	
1983-04-28	↳ Yongtai County	↳ Yongtai County	transferred	
1983-04-28	↳ Fuqing County	↳ Fuqing County	transferred	
1983-04-28	↳ Changle County	↳ Changle County	transferred	
1983-04-28	↳ Pingtan County	↳ Pingtan County	transferred	
1983-04-28	Ningde Prefecture	Fuzhou (PL-City)	transferred	
1983-04-28	↳ Lianjiang County	↳ Lianjiang County	transferred	
1983-04-28	↳ Luoyuan County	↳ Luoyuan County	transferred	
1983-04-28	Sanming Prefecture	Sanming (PL-City)	reorganized	
1983-09-09	parts of Jinjiang Prefecture	Putian (PL-City)	established	
1983-09-09	↳ Putian County	↳ Chengxiang District	established	
1983-09-09	↳ Putian County	↳ Hanjiang District	established	
1983-09-09	↳ Putian County	↳ Putian County	transferred	
1983-09-09	↳ Xianyou County	↳ Xianyou County	transferred	
1983-10-17	Shaowu County	Shaowu (CL-City)	reorganized	
1984-09-12	Yong'an County	Yong'an (CL-City)	reorganized	
1985-05-14	Jinjiang Prefecture	Quanzhou (PL-City) city district	reorganized	
1985-05-14	↳ Quanzhou (CL-City)	Quanzhou (PL-City) city district	disestablished	
1985-05-14	Longxi Prefecture	Zhangzhou (PL-City)	reorganized	
1985-05-14	Zhangzhou (CL-City)	Xiangcheng District	reorganized	
1985-12-22	Quanzhou (PL-City) city district	Licheng District	established	
1987-06-10	parts of Siming District	Huli District	established	
1987-06-10	Jiao District, Xiamen	Jimei District	renamed	
1987-12-07	parts of Jinjiang County	Shishi (CL-City)	established	
1988-10-04	Ningde County	Ningde (CL-City)	established	
1988-10-24	Jianyang Prefecture	Nanping Prefecture	renamed	
1989-08-21	Chong'an County	Wuyishan (CL-City)	established	
1989-11-13	Fu'an County	Fu'an (CL-City)	established	
1990-08-15	Zhangping County	Zhangping (CL-City)	reorganized	
1990-12-26	Fuqing County	Fuqing (CL-City)	reorganized	
1992-03-06	Jinjiang County	Jinjiang (CL-City)	reorganized	Civil Affairs [1992]23
1993-10-20	Jian'ou County	Jian'ou (CL-City)	reorganized	Civil Affairs [1992]121
1993-03-12	Longhai County	Longhai (CL-City)	reorganized	Civil Affairs [1993]94
1993-03-12	Nan'an County	Nan'an (CL-City)	reorganized	Civil Affairs [1993]95
1994-02-18	Changle County	Changle (CL-City)	reorganized	Civil Affairs [1994]28
1994-03-04	Jianyang County	Jianyang (CL-City)	reorganized	Civil Affairs [1994]40
1994-09-05	Nanping Prefecture	Nanping (PL-City)	reorganized	State Council [1994]94
1994-09-05	Nanping (CL-City)	Yanping District	reorganized	State Council [1994]94
1995-10-13	Fuding County	Fuding (CL-City)	reorganized	
1995-03-04	Jiao District, Fuzhou	Jin'an District	reorganized	State Council [1995]102
1996-05-31	parts of Xiangcheng District	Longwen District	established	State Council [1996]38
1996-11-20	Longyan Prefecture	Longyan (PL-City)	reorganized	State Council [1996]100
1996-11-20	Longyan (CL-City)	Xinluo District	reorganized	State Council [1996]100
1996-11-20	Tong'an County	Tong'an District	established	State Council [1996]101
1997-06-03	parts of Licheng District, Quanzhou	Fengze District	reorganized	State Council [1997]42
1997-06-03	parts of Licheng District, Quanzhou	Luojiang District	reorganized	State Council [1997]42
1999-11-14	Ningde Prefecture	Ningde (PL-City)	reorganized	State Council [1999]136
1999-11-14	Ningde (CL-City)	Jiaocheng District	reorganized	State Council [1999]136
2000-04-20	parts of Hui'an County	Quangang District	established	State Council [2000]31
2002-02-01	Putian County	Chengxiang District	disestablished & merged into	State Council [2002]9
2002-02-01	Putian County	Hanjiang District	disestablished & merged into	State Council [2002]9
2002-02-01	Putian County	Licheng District, Putian	disestablished & established	State Council [2002]9
2002-02-01	Putian County	Xiuyu District	disestablished & established	State Council [2002]9
2003-04-26	Gulangyu District	Siming District	merged into	State Council [2003]2
2003-04-26	Kaiyuan District	Siming District	merged into	State Council [2003]2
2003-04-26	Xinglin District	Haicang District	merged into	State Council [2003]2
2003-04-26	parts of Tong'an District	Xiang'an District	established	State Council [2003]2
2014-05-02	Jianyang (CL-City)	Jianyang District	reorganized	State Council [2014]57
2014-12-30	Yongding County	Yongding District	reorganized	State Council [2014]159
2017-07-18	Changle (CL-City)	Changle District	reorganized	State Council [2017]103
2019-01-01	Fujian Provincial Government dissolved → Kinmen–Matsu Joint Services Center; All counties now governed directly by the Executive Yuan			Executive Yuan of the R.O.C.

== Population composition ==
=== Prefectures ===
Prefecture	2010	2000
Fuzhou	7,115,370	6,386,013
Xiamen	3,531,347	2,053,070
Longyan	2,559,545	2,684,310
Nanping	3,138,967	3,040,799
Ningde	3,393,698	3,235,705
Putian	2,778,508	2,727,923
Quanzhou	8,128,530	7,283,040
Sanming	2,503,388	2,574,075
Zhangzhou	4,809,983	4,581,675

=== Counties ===
Name	Prefecture	2010
Gulou	Fuzhou	687,706
Taijiang	Fuzhou	446,891
Cangshan	Fuzhou	762,746
Mawei	Fuzhou	231,929
Jin'an	Fuzhou	792,491
Minhou	Fuzhou	662,118
Lianjiang	Fuzhou	561,490
Luoyuan	Fuzhou	207,677
Minqing	Fuzhou	237,643
Yongtai	Fuzhou	249,455
Pingtan	Fuzhou	357,760
Fuqing	Fuzhou	1,234,838
Changle	Fuzhou	682,626
Siming	Xiamen	929,998
Haicang	Xiamen	288,739
Huli	Xiamen	931,291
Jimei	Xiamen	580,857
Tong'an	Xiamen	496,129
Xiang'an	Xiamen	304,333
Chengxiang	Putian	413,853
Hanjiang	Putian	470,097
Licheng	Putian	499,110
Xiuyu	Putian	570,741
Xianyou	Putian	824,707
Meilie	Sanming	176,539
Sanyuan	Sanming	198,958
Mingxi	Sanming	102,667
Qingliu	Sanming	136,248
Ninghua	Sanming	272,443
Datian	Sanming	311,631
Youxi	Sanming	352,067
Sha(xian)	Sanming	226,669
Jiangle	Sanming	148,867
Taining	Sanming	110,278
Jianning	Sanming	119,979
Yong'an	Sanming	347,042
Licheng	Quanzhou	404,817
Fengze	Quanzhou	529,640
Luojiang	Quanzhou	187,189
Quangang	Quanzhou	313,539
Hui'an	Quanzhou	944,231
Anxi	Quanzhou	977,432
Yongchun	Quanzhou	452,217
Dehua	Quanzhou	277,867
Shishi	Quanzhou	636,700
Jinjiang	Quanzhou	1,986,447
Nan'an	Quanzhou	1418,451
Xiangcheng	Zhangzhou	538,186
Longwen	Zhangzhou	167,463
Yunxiao	Zhangzhou	415,835
Zhangpu	Zhangzhou	802,971
Zhao'an	Zhangzhou	597,798
Changtai	Zhangzhou	206,809
Dongshan	Zhangzhou	211,505
Nanjing	Zhangzhou	333,969
Pinghe	Zhangzhou	498,533
Hua'an	Zhangzhou	159,152
Longhai	Zhangzhou	877,762
Yanping	Nanping	467,875
Shunchang	Nanping	191,588
Pucheng	Nanping	304,583
Guangze	Nanping	134,113
Songxi	Nanping	125,472
Zhenghe	Nanping	171,715
Shaowu	Nanping	275,110
Wuyishan	Nanping	233,557
Jian'ou	Nanping	452,174
Jianyang	Nanping	289,362
Xinluo	Longyan	662,429
Changting	Longyan	393,390
Yongding	Longyan	362,658
Shanghang	Longyan	374,047
Wuping	Longyan	278,182
Liancheng	Longyan	248,645
Zhangping	Longyan	240,194
Jiaocheng	Ningde	429,260
Xiapu	Ningde	461,176
Gutian	Ningde	323,700
Pingnan	Ningde	137,724
Shouning	Ningde	175,874
Zhouning	Ningde	112,701
Zherong	Ningde	88,387
Fu'an	Ningde	563,640
Fuding	Ningde	529,534
Kinmen (claimed)	Quanzhou	

== See also ==
- List of township-level divisions of Fujian, for the township-level divisions within each county
