= List of township-level divisions of Fujian =

Location of Fujian Province in China

This is a list of township-level divisions of the province of Fujian, People's Republic of China (PRC). After province, prefecture, and county-level divisions, township-level divisions constitute the formal fourth-level administrative divisions of the PRC. There are a total of 1,103 such divisions in Fujian, divided into 173 subdistricts, 600 towns, 311 townships, and 19 ethnic townships, including 7 divisions which are governed by the Republic of China (ROC) on Taiwan. This list is divided first into the prefecture-level then the county-level divisions.

== Fuzhou ==
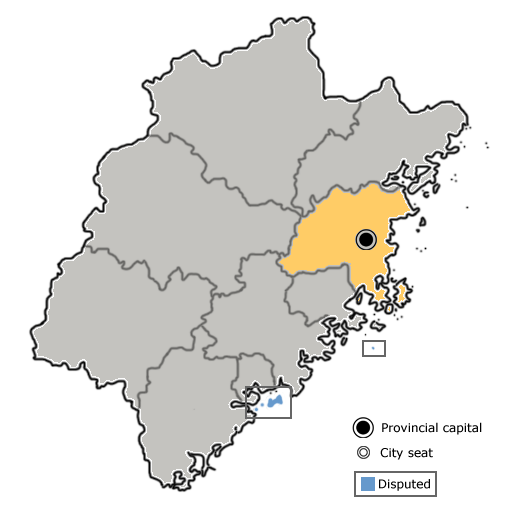
Location of Fuzhou in the province

=== Cangshan District ===
Subdistricts:

- Cangqian Subdistrict (仓前街道), Dongsheng Subdistrict (东升街道), Duihu Subdistrict (对湖街道), Jinshan Subdistrict (金山街道), Linjiang Subdistrict (临江街道), Sancha Avenue Subdistrict (三叉街街道), Shangdu Subdistrict (上渡街道), Xiadu Subdistrict (下渡街道)

Towns:

- Cangshan (仓山镇), Chengmen (城门镇), Gaishan (盖山镇), Jianxin (建新镇), Luozhou (螺洲镇)

=== Gulou District ===
Subdistricts:

- Huada Subdistrict (华大街道), Gudong Subdistrict (鼓东街道), Guxi Subdistrict (鼓西街道), Nanjie Subdistrict (南街街道), Antai Subdistrict (安泰街道), Dongjie Subdistrict (东街街道), Shuibu Subdistrict (水部街道), Wenquan Subdistrict (温泉街道), Wufeng Subdistrict (五凤街道)

The only town is Hongshan (洪山镇)

=== Jin'an District ===
Subdistricts:

- Chayuan Subdistrict (茶园街道), Wangzhuang Subdistrict (王庄街道), Xiangyuan Subdistrict (象园街道)

Towns:

- Yuefeng (岳峰镇), Gushan (鼓山镇), Xindian (新店镇), Huanxi (宦溪镇)

Townships:

- Shoushan Township (寿山乡), Rixi Township (日溪乡)

=== Mawei District ===
The only subdistrict is Luoxing Subdistrict (罗星街道)

Towns:

- Mawei Town (马尾镇), Tingjiang (亭江镇), Langqi (琅岐镇)

=== Taijiang District ===
Subdistricts:

- Chating Subdistrict (茶亭街道), Yangzhong Subdistrict (洋中街道), Cangxia Subdistrict (苍霞街道), Yizhou Subdistrict (义洲街道), Shanghai Subdistrict (上海街道), Yingzhou Subdistrict (瀛洲街道), Xingang Subdistrict (新港街道), Houzhou Subdistrict (后洲街道), Aofeng Subdistrict (鳌峰街道), Ninghua Subdistrict (宁化街道)

=== Changle ===
Subdistricts:

- Wuhang Subdistrict (吴航街道), Hangcheng Subdistrict (航城街道), Zhanggang Subdistrict (漳港街道), Yingqian Subdistrict (营前街道)

Towns:

- Shoudian (首占镇), Yutian (玉田镇), Guhuai (古槐镇), Jiangtian (江田镇), Songxia (松下镇), Jinfeng (金峰镇), Heshang (鹤上镇), Hunan (湖南镇), Wenling (文岭镇), Meihua (梅花镇), Tantou (潭头镇), Wenwusha (文武砂镇)

Townships:

- Luolian Township (罗联乡), Houyu Township (猴屿乡)

=== Fuqing ===
Subdistricts:

- Yuping Subdistrict (玉屏街道), Longshan Subdistrict (龙山街道), Longjiang Subdistrict (龙江街道), Yinxi Subdistrict (音西街道), Honglu Subdistrict (宏路街道), Shizhu Subdistrict (石竹街道), Yangxia Subdistrict (阳下街道)

Towns:

- Haikou (海口镇), Chengtou (城头镇), Nanling (南岭镇), Longtian (龙田镇), Jiangjing (江镜镇), Gangtou (港头镇), Gaoshan (高山镇), Shabu (沙埔镇), Sanshan (三山镇), Donghan (东瀚镇), Yuxi (渔溪镇), Shangjing (上迳镇), Xincuo (新厝镇), Jiangyin (江阴镇), Dongzhang (东张镇), Jingyang (镜洋镇), Yidu (一都镇)

=== Lianjiang County ===
Towns:

- Fengcheng (凤城镇), Aojiang (敖江镇), Dongdai (东岱镇), Guntou (琯头镇), Xiao'ao (晓澳镇), Donghu (东湖镇), Danyang (丹阳镇), Changlong (长龙镇), Toubao (透堡镇), Mabi (马鼻镇), Guanban (官坂镇), Xiaocheng (筱埕镇), Huangqi (黄岐镇), Tailu (苔菉镇), Pukou (浦口镇), Kengyuan (坑园镇)

Townships:

- Pandu Township (潘渡乡), Jiangnan Township (江南乡), Liaoyan Township (蓼沿乡), Ankai Township (安凯乡), Xiaguan Township (下宫乡), Xiaocang She Ethnic Township (小沧畲族乡), Mazu Township (马祖乡)^{1}

=== Luoyuan County ===
Towns:

- Fengshan (凤山镇), Jianjiang (鉴江镇), Qibu (起步镇), Songshan (松山镇), Zhongfang (中房镇), Feizhu (飞竹镇)

Townships:

- Baita Township (白塔乡), Hongyang Township (洪洋乡), Xilan Township (西兰乡), Bili Township (碧里乡), Huokou She Ethnic Township (霍口畲族乡)

=== Minhou County ===
The only subdistrict is Ganzhe Subdistrict (甘蔗街道)

Towns:

- Baisha (白沙镇), Nanyu (南屿镇), Shanggan (尚干镇), Xiangqian (祥谦镇), Qingkou (青口镇), Nantong (南通镇), Shangjie (上街镇), Jingxi (荆溪镇)

Townships:

- Zhuqi Township (竹岐乡), Hongwei Township (鸿尾乡), Yangli Township (洋里乡), Dahu Township (大湖乡), Yanping Township (廷坪乡), Xiaoruo Township (小箬乡)

=== Minqing County ===
Towns:

- Meicheng (梅城镇), Bandong (坂东镇), Chiyuan (池园镇), Meixi (梅溪镇), Baizhang (白樟镇), Baizhong (白中镇), Tazhuang (塔庄镇), Dongqiao (东桥镇), Xiongjiang (雄江镇), Jinsha (金沙镇), Shenghuang (省璜镇)

Townships:

- Yunlong Township (云龙乡), Shanglian Township (上莲乡), Sanxi Township (三溪乡), Xiazhu Township (下祝乡), Kulin Township (桔林乡)

=== Pingtan County ===
Towns:

- Tancheng (潭城镇), Su'ao (苏澳镇), Aoqian (澳前镇), Beicuo (北厝镇), Liushui (流水镇), Pingyuan (平原镇), Aodong (敖东镇)

Townships:

- Lancheng Township (岚城乡), Zhonglou Township (中楼乡), Baiqing Township (白青乡), Nanhai Township (南海乡), Yutou Township (屿头乡), Dalian Township (大练乡), Dongxiang Township (东庠乡), Luyang Township (芦洋乡)

=== Yongtai County ===
Towns:

- Zhangcheng (樟城镇), Songkou (嵩口镇), Wutong (梧桐镇), Geling (葛岭镇), Chengfeng (城峰镇), Qingliang (清凉镇), Changqing (长庆镇), Tong'an (同安镇), Dayang (大洋镇)

Towns:

- Tangqian Township (塘前乡), Fuquan Township (富泉乡), Linglu Township (岭路乡), Chixi Township (赤锡乡), Fukou Township (洑口乡), Gaiyang Township (盖洋乡), Dongyang Township (东洋乡), Xiaba Township (霞拔乡), Pangu Township (盘谷乡), Hongxing Township (红星乡), Baiyun Township (白云乡), Danyun Township (丹云乡)

== Xiamen ==
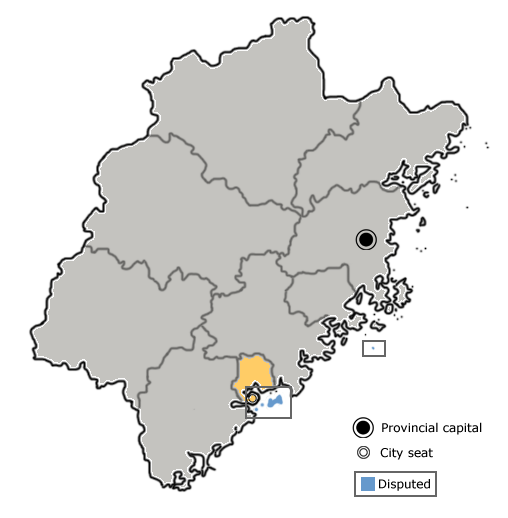
Location of Xiamen in the province

=== Haicang District ===
Subdistricts:

- Haicang Subdistrict (海沧街道), Xinyang Subdistrict (新阳街道)

The only town is Dongfu (东孚镇)

=== Huli District ===
Subdistricts:

- Jinshan Subdistrict (金山街道), Huli Subdistrict (湖里街道), Dianqian Subdistrict (殿前街道), Heshan Subdistrict, Xiamen (禾山街道), Jiangtou Subdistrict (江头街道)

=== Jimei District ===
Subdistricts:

- Jimei Subdistrict (集美街道), Qiaoying Subdistrict (侨英街道), Xinglin Subdistrict (杏林街道), Xingbin Subdistrict (杏滨街道)

Towns:

- Guankou (灌口镇), Houxi (后溪镇)

=== Siming District ===
Subdistricts:

- Xiagang Subdistrict (厦港街道), Zhonghua Subdistrict (中华街道), Binhai Subdistrict (滨海街道), Lujiang Subdistrict (鹭江街道), Kaiyuan Subdistrict (开元街道), Wucun Subdistrict (梧村街道), Yundang Subdistrict (筼筜街道), Jialian Subdistrict (嘉莲街道), Lianqian Subdistrict (莲前街道), Gulangyu Subdistrict (鼓浪屿街道)

=== Tong'an District ===
Subdistricts:

- Datong Subdistrict (大同街道), Xiangping Subdistrict (祥平街道)

Towns:

- Hongtang (洪塘镇), Tingxi (汀溪镇), Lianhua (莲花镇), Xinmin (新民镇), Wuxian (五显镇), Xike (西柯镇)

=== Xiang'an District ===
The only subdistrict is Dadeng Subdistrict (大嶝街道)

Towns:

- Xindian (新店镇), Xinxu (新圩镇), Maxiang (马巷镇), Neicuo (内厝镇)

Other: Damaoshan Farm (大帽山农场)

== Longyan ==
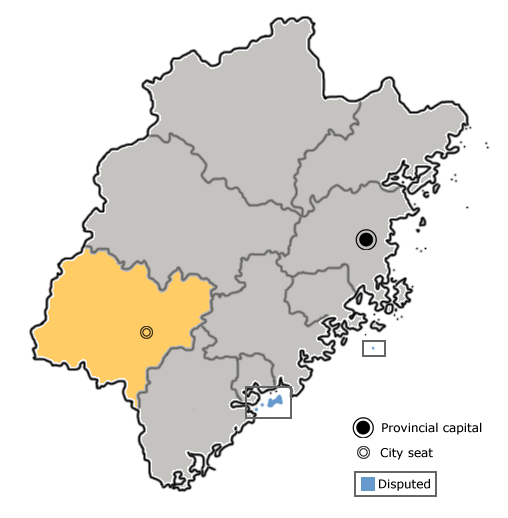
Location of Longyan in the province

=== Xinluo District ===
Subdistricts:

- Dongcheng Subdistrict (东城街道), Nancheng Subdistrict (南城街道), Xicheng Subdistrict (西城街道), Zhongcheng Subdistrict (中城街道), Xibei Subdistrict (西陂街道), Caoxi Subdistrict (曹溪街道), Dongxiao Subdistrict (东肖街道), Longmen Subdistrict (龙门街道), Tieshan Subdistrict (铁山街道)

Towns:

- Hongfang (红坊镇), Shizhong (适中镇), Yanshi (雁石镇), Baisha (白沙镇), Wan'an (万安镇), Dachi (大池镇), Xiaochi (小池镇), Jiangshan (江山镇)

Townships:

- Yanshan Township (岩山乡), Suban Township (苏坂乡)

=== Zhangping ===
Subdistricts:

- Jingcheng Subdistrict (菁城街道), Guilin Subdistrict (桂林街道)

Towns:

- Xinqiao (新桥镇), Yongfu (永福镇), Xinan (溪南镇), Shuangyang (双洋镇), Heping (和平镇), Gongqiao (拱桥镇), Xianghu (象湖镇), Chishui (赤水镇)

Townships:

- Luzhi Township (芦芝乡), Xiyuan Township (西园乡), Nanyang Township (南洋乡), Guantian Township (官田乡), Wuci Township (吾祠乡), Lingdi Township (灵地乡)

=== Changting County ===
Towns:

- Tingzhou (汀州镇), Guanqian (馆前镇), Hetian (河田镇), Datong (大同镇), Gucheng (古城镇), Xinqiao (新桥镇), Tongfang (童坊镇), Nanshan (南山镇), Guantian (濯田镇), Sidu (四都镇), Tufang (涂坊镇), Sanzhou (三洲镇), Cewu (策武镇)

Townships:

- Tiechang Township (铁长乡), Anjie Township (庵杰乡), Xuancheng Township (宣成乡), Hongshan Township (红山乡), Yanggu Township (羊牯乡)

=== Liancheng County ===
Towns:

- Lianfeng (莲峰镇), Gutian (姑田镇), Miaoqian (庙前镇), Beituan (北团镇), Pengkou (朋口镇), Juxi (莒溪镇), Xinquan (新泉镇), Wenxiang (文亨镇)

Townships:

- Tangqian Township (塘前乡), Sibao Township (四堡乡), Luokeng Township (罗坊乡), Quxi Township (曲溪乡), Laiyuan Township (赖源乡), Xuanhe Township (宣和乡), Linfang Township (林坊乡), Jiele Township (揭乐乡), Gechuan Township (隔川乡)

=== Shanghang County ===
Towns:

- Linjiang (临江镇), Lincheng (临城镇), Lanxi (蓝溪镇), Gutian (古田镇), Nanyang (南阳镇), Caixi (才溪镇), Zhongdu (中都镇), Rentian (稔田镇), Baisha (白砂镇)

Townships:

- Huyang Township (湖洋乡), Jiuxian Township (旧县乡), Tongxian Township (通贤乡), Chadi Township (茶地乡), Panjing Township (泮境乡), Xiadu Township (下都乡), Taiba Township (太拔乡), Xikou Township (溪口乡), Jiaoyang Township (蛟洋乡), Buyun Township (步云乡), Shanhu Township (珊瑚乡), Guanzhuang She Ethnic Township (官庄畲族乡), Lufeng She Ethnic Township (庐丰畲族乡)

=== Wuping County ===
Towns:

- Pingchuan (平川镇), Yanqian (岩前镇), Shifang (十方镇), Zhongshan (中山镇), Zhongbao (中堡镇), Taoxi (桃溪镇)

Townships:

- Chengxiang Township (城厢乡), Wan'an Township (万安乡), Dongliu Township (东留乡), Minzhu Township (民主乡), Xiaba Township (下坝乡), Zhongchi Township (中赤乡), Xiangdong Township (象洞乡), Wudong Township (武东乡), Yongping Township (永平乡), Xiangdian Township (湘店乡), Dahe Township (大禾乡)

=== Yongding County ===
Subdistrict:

- Fengcheng (凤城街道, formerly 凤城镇)

Towns:

- Kanshi (坎市镇), Xiayang (下洋镇), Fushi (抚市镇), Gaobei (高陂镇), Hulei (湖雷镇), Hukeng (湖坑镇), Peifeng (培丰镇), Fengshi (峰市镇), Longtan (龙潭镇)

Townships:

- Chengjiao Township (城郊乡), Xianshi Township (仙师乡), Hongshan Township (洪山乡), Hushan Township (湖山乡), Qiling Township (岐岭乡), Daxi Township (大溪乡), Guzhu Township (古竹乡), Hugang Township (虎岗乡), Tangbao Township (堂堡乡), Hexi Township (合溪乡), Jinsha Township (金砂乡), Xixi Township (西溪乡), Chendong Township (陈东乡), Gaotou Township (高头乡)

== Nanping ==
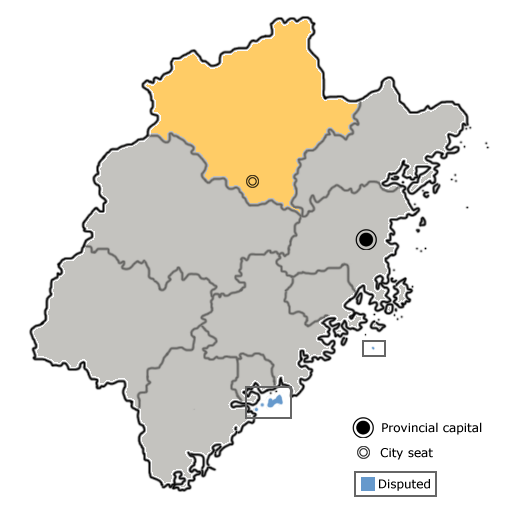
Location of Nanping in the province

=== Yanping District ===
Subdistricts:

- Sihe Subdistrict (四鹤街道), Meishan Subdistrict (梅山街道), Huangdun Subdistrict (黄墩街道), Ziyun Subdistrict (紫云街道), Shuinan Subdistrict (水南街道), Shuidong Subdistrict (水东街道)

Towns:

- Laizhou (来舟镇), Zhanghu (樟湖镇), Xiadao (夏道镇), Xiqin (西芹镇), Xiayang (峡阳镇), Daheng (大横镇), Nanshan (南山镇), Yanghou (洋后镇), Taqian (塔前镇), Wangtai (王台镇), Mangdang (茫荡镇), Taiping (太平镇), Luxia (炉下镇)

Townships:

- Jukou Township (巨口乡), Chimen Township (赤门乡)

=== Jian'ou ===
Subdistricts:

- Jian'an Subdistrict (建安街道), Tongji Subdistrict (通济街道), Ouning Subdistrict (瓯宁街道), Zhishan Subdistrict (芝山街道)

Towns:

- Xudun (徐墩镇), Jiyang (吉阳镇), Fangdao (房道镇), Nanya (南雅镇), Dikou (迪口镇), Xiaoqiao (小桥镇), Yushan (玉山镇), Dongyou (东游镇), Dongfeng (东峰镇), Xiaosong (小松镇)

Townships:

- Shunyang Township (顺阳乡), Shuiyuan Township (水源乡), Chuanshi Township (川石乡), Longcun Township (龙村乡)

=== Jianyang ===
Subdistricts:

- Tancheng Subdistrict (潭城街道), Tongyou Subdistrict (童游街道)

Towns:

- Masha (麻沙镇), Shuiji (水吉镇), Xiaohu (小湖镇), Jukou (莒口镇), Jiangkou (将口镇), Xushi (徐市镇), Huangkeng (黄坑镇), Zhangdun (漳墩镇)

Townships:

- Huilong Township (回龙乡), Shufang Township (书坊乡), Chongluo Township (崇雒乡)

=== Shaowu ===
Subdistricts:

- Zhaoyang Subdistrict (昭阳街道), Tongtai Subdistrict (通泰街道), Shuibei Subdistrict (水北街道), Shaikou Subdistrict (晒口街道)

Towns:

- Chengjiao (城郊镇), Shuibei (水北镇), Xiasha (下沙镇), Weimin (卫闽镇), Yanshan (沿山镇), Nakou (拿口镇), Hongdun (洪墩镇), Dabugang (大埠岗镇), Heping (和平镇), Xiaojiafang (肖家坊镇), Dazhu (大竹镇), Wujiatang (吴家塘镇)

Townships:

- Guilin Township (桂林乡), Zhangcuo Township (张厝乡), Jinkeng Township (金坑乡)

=== Wuyishan City ===
Subdistricts:

- Chong'an Subdistrict (崇安街道), Xinfeng Subdistrict (新丰街道), Wuyi Subdistrict (武夷街道)

Towns:

- Xingcun (星村镇), Xingtian (兴田镇), Wufu (五夫镇)

Townships:

- Shangmei Township (上梅乡), Wutun Township (吴屯乡), Langu Township (岚谷乡), Yangzhuang Township (洋庄乡)

=== Guangze County ===
Towns:

- Hangchuan (杭川镇), Zhaili (寨里镇), Zhima (止马镇)

Townships:

- Luanfeng Township (鸾凤乡), Chongren Township (崇仁乡), Lifang Township (李坊乡), Huaqiao Township (华桥乡), Siqian Township (司前乡)

=== Pucheng County ===
Subdistricts:

- Nanpu Subdistrict (南浦街道), Hebin Subdistrict (河滨街道)

Towns:

- Fuling (富岭镇), Shibei (石陂镇), Linjiang (临江镇), Xianyang (仙阳镇), Shuibeijie (水北街镇), Yongxing (永兴镇), Zhongxin (忠信镇), Liantang (莲塘镇), Jiumu (九牧镇)

Townships:

- Wan'an Township (万安乡), Gulou Township (古楼乡), Shanxia Township (山下乡), Fengxi Township (枫溪乡), Haocun Township (濠村乡), Guancuo Township (管厝乡), Panting Township (盘亭乡), Guanlu Township (官路乡)

=== Shunchang County ===
The only subdistrict is Shuangxi Subdistrict (双溪街道)

Towns:

- Jianxi (建西镇), Yangkou (洋口镇), Yuankeng (元坑镇), Pushang (埔上镇), Dali (大历镇), Dagan (大干镇), Renshou (仁寿镇)

Townships:

- Yangdun Township (洋墩乡), Zhengfang Township (郑坊乡), Lanxia Township (岚下乡), Gaoyang Township (高阳乡)

=== Songxi County ===
The only subdistrict is Songyuan Subdistrict (松源街道)

Towns:

- Weitian (渭田镇), Zhengdun (郑墩镇)

Townships:

- Chaping Township (茶平乡), Hedong Township (河东乡), Huaqiao Township (花桥乡), Jiuxian Township (旧县乡), Xidong Township (溪东乡), Zudun Township (祖墩乡)

=== Zhenghe County ===
The only subdistrict is Xiongshan Subdistrict (熊山街道)

Towns:

- Dongping (东平镇), Tieshan (铁山镇), Zhenqian (镇前镇), Shitun (石屯镇)

Townships:

- Xingxi Township (星溪乡), Waitun Township (外屯乡), Yangyuan Township (杨源乡), Chengyuan Township (澄源乡), Lingyao Township (岭腰乡)

== Ningde ==
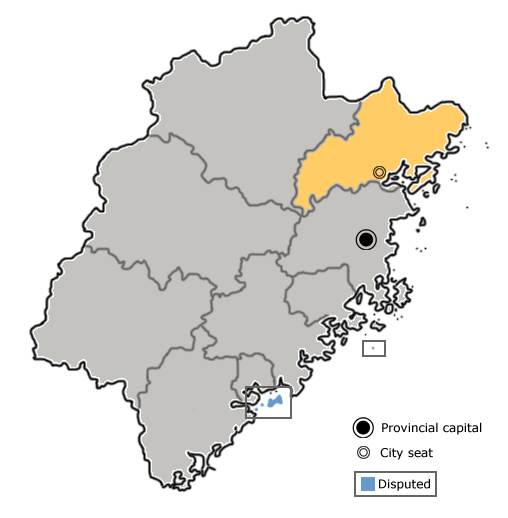
Location of Ningde in the province

=== Jiaocheng District ===
Subdistricts:

- Jiaonan Subdistrict (蕉南街道), Jiaobei Subdistrict (蕉北街道)

Towns:

- Chengnan (城南镇), Zhangwan (漳湾镇), Qidu (七都镇), Badu (八都镇), Jiudu (九都镇), Feiluan (飞鸾镇), Sandu (三都镇), Chixi (赤溪镇), Huotong (霍童镇), Yangzhong (洋中镇)

Townships:

- Hongkou Township (洪口乡), Shihou Township (石后乡), Hubei Township (虎贝乡), Jinhan She Ethnic Township (金涵畲族乡)

=== Fu'an ===
Subdistricts:

- Yangtou Subdistrict (阳头街道), Chengbei Subdistrict (城北街道), Chengnan Subdistrict (城南街道)

Towns:

- Saiqi (赛岐镇), Muyang (穆阳镇), Gantang (甘棠镇), Xiabaishi (下白石镇), Xibing (溪柄镇), Shangbaishi (上白石镇), Shekou (社口镇), Tantou (潭头镇), Xiaoyang (晓阳镇), Xiwei (溪尾镇), Xitan (溪潭镇), Wanwu (湾坞镇), Chengyang (城阳镇)

Townships:

- Fankeng Township (范坑乡), Songluo Township (松罗乡), Banzhong She Ethnic Township Township (坂中畲族乡), Muyun She Ethnic Township Township (穆云畲族乡), Kangcuo She Ethnic Township Township (康厝畲族乡)

Other:

- Saiqi Development Zone (赛岐开发区), Fu'an She Development Zone (福安畲族开发区), 湾坞工业集中区

=== Fuding ===
Subdistricts:

- Tongshan Subdistrict (桐山街道), Tongcheng Subdistrict (桐城街道), Shanqian Subdistrict (山前街道)

Towns:

- Taimushan (太姥山镇), Qianqi (前岐镇), Diantou (点头镇), Shacheng (沙埕镇), Bailin (白琳镇), Dianxia (店下镇), Guanling (贯岭镇), Boxi (磻溪镇), Guanyang (管阳镇), Yushan (嵛山镇)

Townships:

- Dieshi Township (叠石乡), Xiamen She Ethnic Township (硖门畲族乡), Jiayang She Ethnic Township (佳阳畲族乡)

Other: Long'an Development Zone (龙安开发区)

=== Gutian County ===
Subdistricts:

- Chengdong Subdistrict (城东街道), Chengxi Subdistrict (城西街道)

Towns:

- Pinghu (平湖镇), Daqiao (大桥镇), Huangtian (黄田镇), Hetang (鹤塘镇), Shanyang (杉洋镇), Fengdu (凤都镇), Shuikou (水口镇)

Townships:

- Jixiang Township (吉巷乡), Panyang Township (泮洋乡), Fengpu Township (凤埔乡), Zhuoyang Township (卓洋乡), Dajia Township (大甲乡)

=== Pingnan County ===
Towns:

- Gufeng (古锋镇), Changqiao (长桥镇), Shuangxi (双溪镇), Daixi (黛溪镇)

Townships:

- Pingcheng Township (屏城乡), Gantang Township (甘棠乡), Tangkou Township (棠口乡), Xiling Township (熙岭乡), Luxia Township (路下乡), Lingxia Township (岭下乡), Shoushan Township (寿山乡)

=== Shouning County ===
Towns:

- Aoyang (鳌阳镇), Xietan (斜滩镇), Nanyang (南阳镇), Wuqu (武曲镇)

Townships:

- Da'an Township (大安乡), Kengdi Township (坑底乡), Qingyuan Township (清源乡), Zhuguanlong Township (竹管垅乡), Qinyang Township (芹洋乡), Xixi Township (犀溪乡), Tuoxi Township (托溪乡), Pingxi Township (平溪乡), Fengyang Township (风阳乡), Xiadang Township (下党乡)

=== Xiapu County ===
Subdistricts:

- Songcheng Subdistrict (松城街道), Songgang Subdistrict (松港街道)

Towns:

- Sansha (三沙镇), Yacheng (牙城镇), Xinan (溪南镇), Shajiang (沙江镇), Xiahu (下浒镇), Changchun (长春镇)

Townships:

- Baiyang Township (柏洋乡), Beibi Township (北壁乡), Haidao Township (海岛乡), Shuimen She Ethnic Township (水门畲族乡), Chongru She Ethnic Township (崇儒畲族乡), Yantian She Ethnic Township (盐田畲族乡)

=== Zherong County ===
Towns:

- Shuangcheng (双城镇), Fuxi (富溪镇)

Townships:

- Chengjiao Township (城郊乡), Zhayang Township (乍洋乡), Dongyuan Township (东源乡), Zhaizhong Township (宅中乡), Huangbai Township (黄柏乡), Chuping Township (楮坪乡), Yingshan Township (英山乡)

=== Zhouning County ===
Towns:

- Shicheng (狮城镇), Xiancun (咸村镇), Puyuan (浦源镇), Qibu (七步镇), Lidun (李墩镇), Chunchi (纯池镇)

Townships:

- Siqiao Township (泗桥乡), Limen Township (礼门乡), Makeng Township (玛坑乡)

== Putian ==
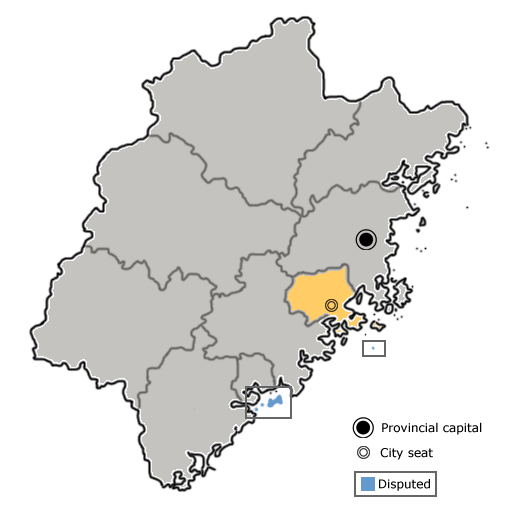
Location of Putian in the province

=== Chengxiang District ===
Subdistricts:

- Xialin Subdistrict (霞林街道), Fenghuangshan Subdistrict (凤凰山街道), Longqiao Subdistrict (龙桥街道)

Towns:

- Changtai (常太镇), Huating (华亭镇), Lingchuan (灵川镇), Donghai (东海镇)

=== Hanjiang District ===
Subdistricts:

- Handong Subdistrict (涵东街道), Hanxi Subdistrict (涵西街道)

Towns:

- Sanjiangkou (三江口镇), Baitang (白塘镇), Guohuan (国欢镇), Jiangkou (江口镇), Wutang (梧塘镇), Qiulu (秋芦镇), Baisha (白沙镇), Xinxian (新县镇), Zhuangbian (庄边镇)

The only township is Dayang Township (大洋乡)

Other: Chigang Overseas Chinese Economic Development Zone (赤港华侨经济开发区)

=== Licheng District, Putian ===
Subdistricts:

- Zhenhai Subdistrict (镇海街道), Gongchen Subdistrict (拱辰街道)

Towns:

- Xitianwei (西天尾镇), Huangshi (黄石镇), Xindu (新度镇), Beigao (北高镇)

=== Xiuyu District ===
Towns:

- Hushi (笏石镇), Dongzhuang (东庄镇), Zhongmen (忠门镇), Dongbu (东埔镇), Meizhou (湄洲镇),^{2} Dongqiao (东峤镇), Daitou (埭头镇), Pinghai (平海镇), Nanri (南日镇), Shanting (山亭镇)

The only township is Yuetang Township (月塘乡)

=== Xianyou County ===
The only subdistrict is Licheng Subdistrict (鲤城街道)

Towns:

- Fengting (枫亭镇), Bangtou (榜头镇), Jiaowei (郊尾镇), Duwei (度尾镇), Linan (鲤南镇), Laidian (赖店镇), Gaiwei (盖尾镇), Yuanzhuang (园庄镇), Daji (大济镇), Longhua (龙华镇), Zhongshan (钟山镇), Youyang (游洋镇)

Townships:

- Xiyuan Township (西苑乡), Shicang Township (石苍乡), Shexing Township (社硎乡), Shufeng Township (书峰乡), Caixi Township (菜溪乡)

== Quanzhou ==
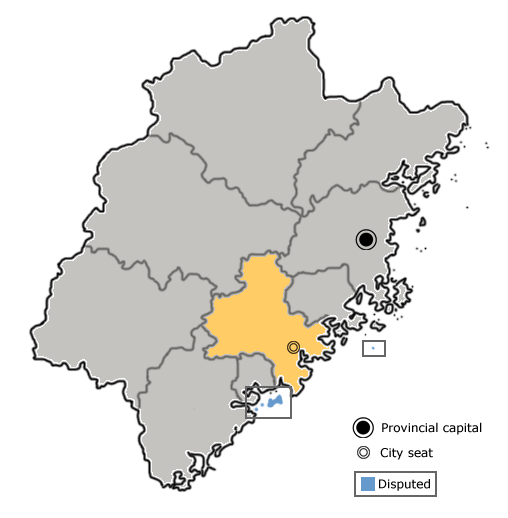
Location of Quanzhou in the province

=== Fengze District ===
Subdistricts:

- Quanxiu Subdistrict (泉秀街道), Fengze Subdistrict (丰泽街道), Donghu Subdistrict (东湖街道), Huada Subdistrict (华大街道), Qingyuan Subdistrict (清源街道), Chengdong Subdistrict (城东街道), Donghai Subdistrict (东海街道), Beifeng Subdistrict (北峰街道)

=== Licheng District, Quanzhou ===
Subdistricts:

- Jiangnan Subdistrict (江南街道), Fuqiao Subdistrict (浮桥街道), Jinlong Subdistrict (金龙街道), Changtai Subdistrict (常泰街道), Kaiyuan Subdistrict (开元街道), Lizhong Subdistrict (鲤中街道), Haibin Subdistrict (海滨街道), Linjiang Subdistrict (临江街道)

Other: 江南高新电子园区

=== Luojiang District ===
Subdistricts:

- Wan'an Subdistrict (万安街道), Shuangyang Subdistrict (双阳街道)

Towns:

- Heshi (河市镇), Majia (马甲镇), Luoxi (罗溪镇)

The only township is Hongshan Township (虹山乡)

=== Quangang District ===
The only subdistrict is Shanyao Subdistrict (山腰街道)

Towns:

- Houlong (后龙镇), Nanpu (南埔镇), Tuling (涂岭镇), Qianhuang (前黄镇), Fengwei (峰尾镇), Jieshan (界山镇)

=== Jinjiang ===
Subdistricts:

- Luoshan Subdistrict (罗山街道), Qingyang Subdistrict (青阳街道), Meiling Subdistrict (梅岭街道), Xiyuan Subdistrict (西园街道), Xintang Subdistrict (新塘街道), Lingyuan Subdistrict (灵源街道)

Towns:

- Anhai (安海镇), Cizao (磁灶镇), Chendai (陈埭镇), Dongshi (东石镇), Shenhu (深沪镇), Quanjing (金井镇), Chidian (池店镇), Neikeng (内坑镇), Longhu (龙湖镇), Yonghe (永和镇), Yinglin (英林镇), Zimao (紫帽镇), Xibin (西滨镇)

=== Nan'an ===
Subdistricts:

- Ximei Subdistrict (溪美街道), Liucheng Subdistrict (柳城街道), Meilin Subdistrict (美林街道)

Towns:

- Guanqiao (官桥镇), Shengxin (省新镇), Luncang (仑苍镇), Dongtian (东田镇), Yingdu (英都镇), Xiangyun (翔云镇), Jintao (金淘镇), Shishan (诗山镇), Penghua (蓬华镇), Matou (码头镇), Jiudu (九都镇), Lefeng (乐峰镇), Luodong (罗东镇), Meishan (梅山镇), Honglai (洪濑镇), Hongmei (洪梅镇), Kangmei (康美镇), Fengzhou (丰州镇), Xiamei (霞美镇), Shuitou (水头镇), Shijing (石井镇)

Townships:

- Meishan Township (眉山乡), Xiangyang Township (向阳乡)

=== Shishi ===
Subdistricts:

- Hubin Subdistrict (湖滨街道), Fengli Subdistrict (凤里街道)

Towns:

- Lingxiu (灵秀镇), Baogai (宝盖镇), Hanjiang (蚶江镇), Yongning (永宁镇), Xiangzhi (祥芝镇), Hongshan (鸿山镇), Jinshang (锦尚镇)

=== Anxi County ===
Towns:

- Fengcheng (凤城镇), Penglai (蓬莱镇), Hutou (湖头镇), Guanqiao (官桥镇), Jiandou (剑斗镇), Chengxiang (城厢镇), Jingu (金谷镇), Longmen (龙门镇), Huqiu (虎邱镇), Lutian (芦田镇), Gande (感德镇), Kuidou (魁斗镇), Xiping (西坪镇)

Townships:

- Cannei Township (参内乡), Bailai Township (白濑乡), Hushang Township (湖上乡), Shangqing Township (尚卿乡), Daping Township (大坪乡), Longjuan Township (龙涓乡), Changkeng Township (长坑乡), Lantian Township (蓝田乡), Xianghua Township (祥华乡), Taozhou Township (桃舟乡), Futian Township (福田乡)

=== Dehua County ===
Towns:

- Xunzhong (浔中镇), Longxun (龙浔镇), Sanban (三班镇), Longmentan (龙门滩镇), Leifeng (雷峰镇), Nancheng (南埕镇), Shuikou (水口镇), Chishui (赤水镇), Gekeng (葛坑镇), Shangyong (上涌镇)

Townships:

- Gaide Township (盖德乡), Yangmei Township (杨梅乡), Tangtou Township (汤头乡), Guiyang Township (桂阳乡), Guobao Township (国宝乡), Meihu Township (美湖乡), Daming Township (大铭乡), Chunmei Township (春美乡)

=== Hui'an County ===
Towns:

- Luocheng (螺城镇), Luòyáng (洛阳镇), Chongwu (崇武镇), Dongyuan (东园镇), Zhangban (张坂镇), Dongling (东岭镇), Wangchuan (辋川镇), Tuzhai (涂寨镇), Luóyáng (螺阳镇), Huangtang (黄塘镇), Shanxia (山霞镇), Jingfeng (净峰镇), Dongqiao (东桥镇), Zishan (紫山镇), Xiaozuo (小岞镇)

The only township is Baiqi Hui Ethnic Township (百崎回族乡)

=== Yongchun County ===
Towns:

- Taocheng (桃城镇), Xiayang (下洋镇), Penghu (蓬壶镇), Wulijie (五里街镇), Hushan (岵山镇), Huyang (湖洋镇), Yidu (一都镇), Kengzaikou (坑仔口镇), Yudou (玉斗镇), Jindou (锦斗镇), Dapu (达埔镇), Wufeng (吾锋镇), Shigu (石鼓镇), Dongping (东平镇), Dongguan (东关镇), Guiyang (桂洋镇), Sukeng (苏坑镇), Xianjia (仙夹镇)

Townships:

- Hengkou Township (横口乡), Chengxiang Township (呈祥乡), Jiefu Township (介福乡), Waishan Township (外山乡)

=== Jinmen County ===
Note: Jinmen County is a county administered by the Fujian Province, ROC and is claimed by the PRC as part of Quanzhou City.

Townships:

- Jincheng (金城乡), Jinhu (金湖乡), Jinsha (金沙乡), Jinning (金宁乡), Lieyu (烈屿乡), Wuqiu (乌丘乡)

== Sanming ==
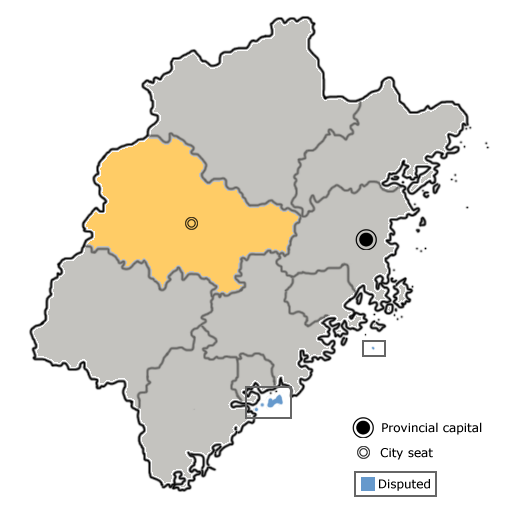
Location of Sanming in the province

=== Meilie District ===
Subdistricts:

- Liedong Subdistrict (列东街道), Liexi Subdistrict (列西街道), Xubi Subdistrict (徐碧街道)

Towns:

- Chenda (陈大镇), Yangxi (洋溪镇)

=== Sanyuan District ===
Subdistricts:

- Chengguan Subdistrict (城关街道), Baisha Subdistrict (白沙街道), Fuxingbao Subdistrict (富兴堡街道), Jingxi Subdistrict (荆西街道)

Towns:

- Xinkou (莘口镇), Yanqian (岩前镇)

Townships:

- Chengdong Township (城东乡), Zhongcun Township (中村乡)

=== Yong'an ===
Subdistricts:

- Yandong Subdistrict (燕东街道), Yanxi Subdistrict (燕西街道), Yannan Subdistrict (燕南街道), Yanbei Subdistrict (燕北街道)

Towns:

- Xiyang (西洋镇), Gongchuan (贡川镇), Ansha (安砂镇), Xiaotao (小陶镇), Dahu (大湖镇), Caoyuan (曹远镇), Hongtian (洪田镇)

Townships:

- Huainan Township (槐南乡), Shangping Township (上坪乡), Luofang Township (罗坊乡), Qingshui She Ethnic Township (青水畲族乡)

=== Datian County ===
Towns:

- Junxi (均溪镇), Shangjing (上京镇), Guangping (广平镇), Taoyuan (桃源镇), Taihua (太华镇), Jianshe (建设镇), Shipai (石牌镇), Qitao (奇韬镇)

Townships:

- Huaxing Township (华兴乡), Pingshan Township (屏山乡), Wushan Township (吴山乡), Jiyang Township (济阳乡), Wuling Township (武陵乡), Xieyang Township (谢洋乡), Wenjiang Township (文江乡), Meishan Township (梅山乡), Humei Township (湖美乡), Qianping Township (前坪乡)

=== Jiangle County ===
Towns:

- Guyong (古镛镇), Wan'an (万安镇), Gaotang (高唐镇), Bailian (白莲镇), Huangtan (黄潭镇), Shuinan (水南镇)

Townships:

- Guangming Township (光明乡), Moyuan Township (漠源乡), Nankou Township (南口乡), Wanquan Township (万全乡), Anren Township (安仁乡), Dayuan Township (大源乡), Xufang Township (余坊乡)

=== Jianning County ===
Towns:

- Suicheng (濉城镇), Lixin (里心镇), Xikou (溪口镇), Junkou (均口镇)

Townships:

- Jinxi Township (金溪乡), Yijia Township (伊家乡), Huangfang Township (黄坊乡), Xiyuan Township (溪源乡), Kefang Township (客坊乡), Huangbu Township (黄埠乡)

=== Mingxi County ===
Towns:

- Xuefeng (雪峰镇), Gaiyang (盖洋镇), Hufang (胡坊镇), Hanxian (瀚仙镇)

Townships:

- Chengguan Township (城关乡), Shaxi Township (沙溪乡), Xiayang Township (夏阳乡), Fengxi Township (枫溪乡), Xiafang Township (夏坊乡)

=== Ninghua County ===
Towns:

- Cuijiang (翠江镇), Quanshang (泉上镇), Hucun (湖村镇), Shibi (石壁镇)

Townships:

- Chengjiao Township (城郊乡), Chengnan Township (城南乡), Jicun Township (济村乡), Huaitu Township (淮土乡), Fangtian Township (方田乡), Anle Township (安乐乡), Caofang Township (曹坊乡), Zhongsha Township (中沙乡), Shuiqian Township (水茜乡), Anyuan Township (安远乡), Helong Township (河龙乡), Zhiping She Ethnic Township (治平畲族乡)

=== Qingliu County ===
Towns:

- Longjin (龙津镇), Songkou (嵩口镇), Songxi (嵩溪镇), Lingdi (灵地镇), Changxiao (长校镇)

Townships:

- Linshe Township (林畲乡), Wenjiao Township (温郊乡), Yupeng Township (余朋乡), Shawu Township (沙芜乡), Laifang Township (赖坊乡), Lijia Township (李家乡), Litian Township (里田乡), Tianyuan Township (田源乡)

=== Sha County ===
Subdistricts:

- Fenggang Subdistrict (凤岗街道), Qiujiang Subdistrict (虬江街道)

Towns:

- Qingzhou (青州镇), Xiamao (夏茂镇), Gaosha (高砂镇), Gaoqiao (高桥镇), Fukou (富口镇), Daluo (大洛镇)

Townships:

- Nanxia Township (南霞乡), Nanyang Township (南阳乡), Zhenghu Township (郑湖乡), Huyuan Township (湖源乡)

=== Taining County ===
Towns:

- Shancheng (杉城镇), Zhukou (朱口镇)

Townships:

- Xinqiao Township (新桥乡), Shangqing Township (上青乡), Datian Township (大田乡), Meikou Township (梅口乡), Xiaqu Township (下渠乡), Kaishan Township (开善乡), Dalong Township (大龙乡)

=== Youxi County ===
Towns:

- Chengguan (城关镇), Youxikou (尤溪口镇), Meixian (梅仙镇), Xibin (西滨镇), Xinyang (新阳镇), Yangzhong (洋中镇), Guanqian (管前镇), Xicheng (西城镇), Banmian (坂面镇)

Townships:

- Lianhe Township (联合乡), Tangchuan Township (汤川乡), Xiwei Township (溪尾乡), Zhongxian Township (中仙乡), Taixi Township (台溪乡), Baziqiao Township (八字桥乡)

== Zhangzhou ==
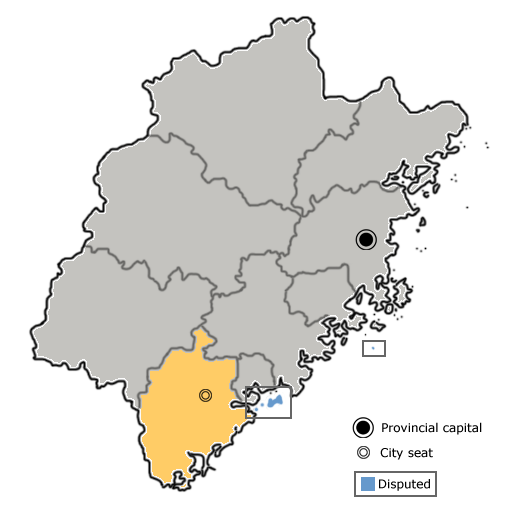
Location of Zhangzhou in the province

=== Longwen District ===
The only subdistrict is Dongyue Subdistrict (东岳街道)

Towns:

- Buwen (步文镇), Lantian (蓝田镇), Chaoyang (朝阳镇), Guokeng (郭坑镇)

=== Xiangcheng District ===
Subdistricts:

- Dongputou Subdistrict (东铺头街道), Xiqiao Subdistrict (西桥街道), Xinqiao Subdistrict (新桥街道), Xiangkou Subdistrict (巷口街道), Nankeng Subdistrict (南坑街道), Tongbei Subdistrict (通北街道)

Towns:

- Punan (浦南镇), Tianbao (天宝镇), Zhishan (芝山镇), Shiting (石亭镇)

Other: Jinfeng Economic Development Zone (金峰经济开发区)

=== Longhai ===
The only subdistrict is Shima Subdistrict (石码街道)

Towns:

- Haicheng (海澄镇), Chengxi (程溪镇), Jiaomei (角美镇), Baishui (白水镇), Fugong (浮宫镇), Gangwei (港尾镇), Jiuhu (九湖镇), Yancuo (颜厝镇), Bangshan (榜山镇), Zini (紫泥镇), Dongyuan (东园镇)

Townships:

- Dongsi Township (东泗乡), Longjiao She Ethnic Township (隆教畲族乡)

Other:

- Jiaomei Industrial Comprehensive Development Zone (角美工业综合开发区), Shuangdi Overseas Chinese Economic Development Zone (双第华侨经济开发区), Chengxi Farm (程溪农场)

=== Changtai County ===
Towns:

- Wu'an (武安镇), Yanxi (岩溪镇), Chenxiang (陈巷镇), Fangyang (枋洋镇)

The only township is Banli Township (坂里乡)

=== Dongshan County ===
Towns:

- Xibu (西埔镇), Xingchen (杏陈镇), Chencheng (陈城镇), Kangmei (康美镇), Zhangtang (樟塘镇), Qianlou (前楼镇), Tongling (铜陵镇)

=== Hua'an County ===
Towns:

- Huafeng (华丰镇), Fengshan (丰山镇), Shajian (沙建镇), Xinxu (新圩镇), Gao'an (高安镇), Xiandu (仙都镇)

Townships:

- Makeng Township (马坑乡), Hulin Township (湖林乡), Gaoche Township (高车乡)

=== Nanjing County ===
Towns:

- Shancheng (山城镇), Jingcheng (靖城镇), Longshan (龙山镇), Chuanchang (船场镇), Jinshan (金山镇), Hexi (和溪镇), Kuiyang (奎洋镇), Nankeng (南坑镇), Fengtian (丰田镇), Meilin (梅林镇), Shuyang (书洋镇)

=== Pinghe County ===
Towns:

- Xiaoxi (小溪镇), Jiufeng (九峰镇), Shange (山格镇), Nansheng (南胜镇), Wenfeng (文峰镇), Banzai (坂仔镇), Daxi (大溪镇), Xiazhai (霞寨镇), Luxi (芦溪镇), Anhou (安厚镇)

Townshisp:

- Wuzhai Township (五寨乡), Guoqiang Township (国强乡), Qiling Township (崎岭乡), Changle Township (长乐乡), Xiufeng Township (秀峰乡)

=== Yunxiao County ===
Towns:

- Yunling (云陵镇), Pumei (莆美镇), Dongxia (东厦镇), Liyu (峛屿镇), Huotian (火田镇), Chendai (陈岱镇)

Townships:

- Xiahe Township (下河乡), Heping Township (和平乡), Mapu Township (马铺乡)

=== Zhangpu County ===
Towns:

- Sui'an (绥安镇), Fotan (佛昙镇), Chihu (赤湖镇), Jiuzhen (旧镇镇), Duxun (杜浔镇), Xiamei (霞美镇), Guanxun (官浔镇), Changqiao (长桥镇), Qianting (前亭镇), Shentu (深土镇), Liu'ao (六鳌镇), Gulei (古雷镇), Pantuo (盘陀镇), Maping (马坪镇), Shiliu (石榴镇), Shaxi (沙西镇), Dananban (大南坂镇)

Townships:

- Nanpu Township (南浦乡), Chitu Township (赤土乡), Huxi She Ethnic Township (湖西畲族乡), Chiling She Ethnic Township (赤岭畲族乡)

=== Zhao'an County ===
Towns:

- Nanzhao (南诏镇), Sidu (四都镇), Qiaodong (桥东镇), Meiling (梅岭镇), Shenqiao (深桥镇), Taiping (太平镇), Guanbei (官陂镇), Xiage (霞葛镇), Xiuzhuan (秀篆镇)

Townships:

- Xizhang Township (西潭乡), Jianshe Township (建设乡), Hongxing Township (红星乡), Jinxing Township (金星乡), Baiyang Township (白洋乡), Meizhou Township (梅洲乡)

== See also ==
- List of administrative divisions of Fujian, for the list of prefecture-level and county-level administrative divisions

== Notes ==
1.Mazu Township is in fact the PRC's claim to the Matsu Islands, which are governed by the Republic of China (ROC) on Taiwan as part of the ROC's Lienchiang County.
2.The island group of Wuqiu is claimed by the PRC as part of the town of Meizhou's jurisdiction, but is in fact governed by Kinmen County of the ROC.
