= Shangqing =

Shangqing may refer to:

- Shangqing (deity), a Taoist god
- Shangqing School, Daoist movement
- Shangqing Bridge, overpass in Beijing
- Shangqing, Jiangxi (上清), a town in Guixi, Jiangxi, China
- Shangqing Township, Anxi County (尚卿乡), a township in Anxi County, Fujian, China
- Shangqing Township, Taining County (上青乡), a township in Taining County, Fujian, China
