= Liancheng Guanzhishan Airport =

Airport in Liancheng, Fujian, China

Liancheng Guanzhishan Airport 连城冠豸山机场
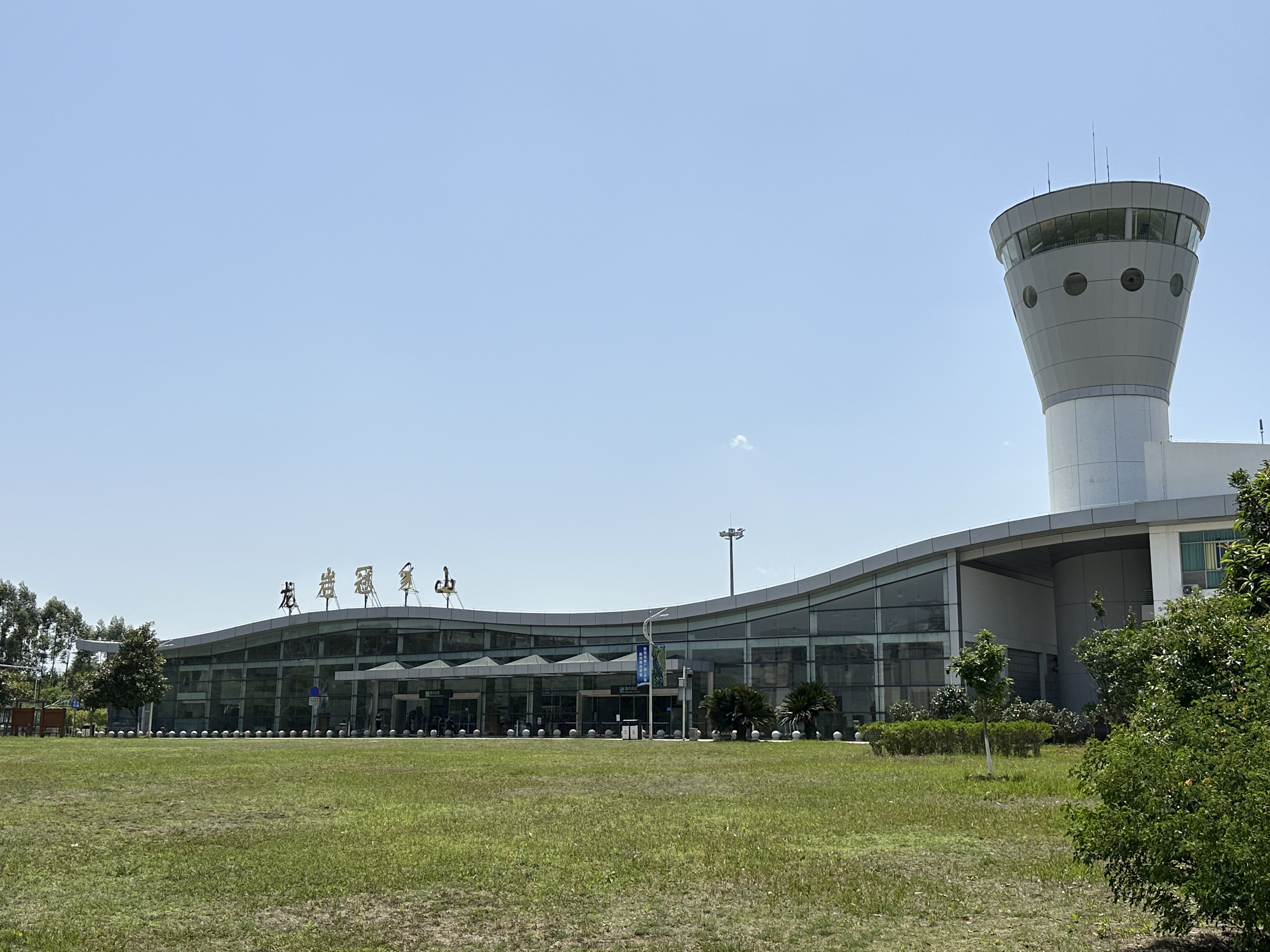
- IATA: LCX; ICAO: ZSLD

Summary
- Airport type: Public / Military
- Serves: Longyan and Liancheng County
- Location: Liancheng County, Fujian, China
- Opened: 25 April 2004; 22 years ago
- Elevation AMSL: 373 m (1,224 ft)
- Coordinates: 25°40′27″N 116°44′47″E
- Website: www.longyanairport.com.cn

Map
- Location of airport in Fujian

Runways
| Direction | Length | | Surface |
| Direction | m | ft | Surface |
|---|---|---|---|
| 03/21 | 2,400 | 7,874 | Cement |

Statistics (2021)
- Passengers: 141,785
- Aircraft movements: 1,908
- Cargo (metric tons): 728.2

Liancheng Guanzhishan Airport
- Simplified Chinese: 连城冠豸山机场
- Traditional Chinese: 連城冠豸山機場
Transcriptions
Standard Mandarin
- Hanyu Pinyin: Liánchéng Guānzhìshān Jīchǎng

Liancheng Guanzhishan Airport (IATA: LCX, ICAO: ZSLD) is a dual-use military and public airport serving the county of Liancheng, Longyan, Fujian, China.

== Location ==
The airport is located in Liancheng County, and was formerly called Liancheng Airport. It has a handling capacity of 140,000 passengers and 800 tons of cargo. It was opened on April 25, 2004. 15,600 passengers passed through the airport in 2005.

== Airlines and destinations ==
| Airlines | Destinations |
|---|---|
| Air Travel | Kunming, Nanjing |
| China Southern Airlines | Guangzhou |
| Juneyao Air | Shanghai–Pudong |
| XiamenAir | Beijing–Daxing |

== See also ==
- List of airports in China
