= Huangkeng =

Huangkeng (黄坑) may refer to the following locations in China:

- Huangkeng, Fujian, town in Jianyang
- Huangkeng, Nanxiong, town in Guangdong
- Huangkeng, Renhua County, town in Guangdong
- Huangkeng Township, Suichuan County, Jiangxi
