= Tantou =

A tantō is a type of knife in Japanese martial arts.

Tantou may also refer to:

== Towns in China ==
- Tantou, Longhui (滩头镇), in Longhui County
- Tantou, Zhejiang (坦头镇), in Tiantai County

=== Chinese towns written as 潭头镇 ===
- Tantou, Changle, Fujian
- Tantou, Fu'an, Fujian
- Tantou, Guangdong, in Gaozhou
- Tantou, Henan, in Luanchuan County

== Townships in China ==
- Tantou Township, Guangxi (潭头乡), in Rong'an County
- Tantou Township, Jiangxi (潭头乡), in Yongfeng County
- Tantou Township, Yunnan (滩头乡), in Yanjin County
