= Baitang =

Baitang may refer to:

== Food and drink ==
- Baitang (soup) (白汤; 白湯; báitāng; 'white soup'), a soup in Chinese cuisine

== Places ==
- Baitang, Fujian (白塘镇), town in Hanjiang District, Putian, Fujian
- Baitang, Miluo (白塘镇), a town in Miluo City, Hunan province
- Baitang, Guangdong (柏塘镇), town in Boluo County, Guangdong
