= Hanxi =

Hanxi may refer to:

- Hanxi Subdistrict, a subdistrict of Hanjiang District, Putian, Fujian, China
- Han opera, a Chinese opera genre from Hubei, formerly known as Hanxi
- Han River (Taiwan), a river in Taichung, Taiwan
- Yilan Creole Japanese, a Japanese-based creole in Yilan, Taiwan, also known as Hanxi language

== See also ==
- Hanxi Changlong station, a Guangzhou Metro station in Guangzhou, Guangdong, China
