= Lingxia =

Lingxia (岭下) may refer to the following locations in China:

- Lingxia, Jilin, town in Taobei District, Baicheng
- Lingxia, Zhejiang, town in Jindong District, Jinhua
- Lingxia Township, Pingnan County, Fujian

== See also ==
- Linxia (disambiguation)
