= Dongfu =

Dongfu may refer to the following locations in China:

- Dongfu, Fujian (东富镇), town in Haicang District, Xiamen
- Dongfu, Liling (东富镇), town in Liling, Hunan
