= Gutian, Liancheng County =

Gutian 姑田镇
- Town
- Location in Fujian Gutian (China)
- Coordinates: 25°41′44″N 116°57′57″E
- Country: People's Republic of China
- Province: Fujian
- Prefecture-level city: Longyan
- County: Liancheng County
- Time zone: UTC+8 (China Standard)

Gutian (Chinese: 姑田; pinyin: Gūtián) is a town in Liancheng County, Fujian province, China. As of 2018, it has 1 residential community and 14 villages under its administration.

== See also ==
- List of township-level divisions of Fujian
