= Xiayang =

Xiayang may refer to the following locations in the People's Republic of China:

- Xiayang Lake (下洋湖), a 2.85 km^{2} (1.10 sq mi) lake in Huangshi, Hubei
- Xiayang, Hunan (霞阳镇), town in Yanling County
- Xiayang, Guangdong (下洋镇), town in Xuwen County

== Fujian ==
- Xiayang, Nanping (峡阳镇), town in Yanping District
- Xiayang, Yongchun County (下洋镇), town
- Xiayang, Yongding County (下洋镇), town
- Xiayang Township (夏阳乡), Mingxi County
