= Dongsheng Subdistrict, Fuzhou =

Dongsheng Subdistrict 东升街道
- Subdistrict
- Location in Fujian Dongsheng (China)
- Coordinates: 26°01′52″N 119°19′36″E
- Country: People's Republic of China
- Province: Fujian
- Prefecture-level city: Fuzhou
- District: Cangshan
- Elevation: 9 m (30 ft)
- Time zone: UTC+8 (China Standard)
- Area code: 0591

Dongsheng Subdistrict (simplified Chinese: 东升街道; traditional Chinese: 東升街道; pinyin: Dōngshēng Jiēdào; lit. 'east rise') is a subdistrict of Cangshan District, Fuzhou, Fujian, People's Republic of China, located at the centre of Nantai Island (南台岛) which comprises the district. As of 2011, it has 4 residential communities (社区) under its administration.

== See also ==
- List of township-level divisions of Fujian
