= Baisha, Putian =

Baisha 白沙镇
- Town
- Location in Fujian Baisha (China)
- Coordinates: 25.5910°N 119.0096°E
- Country: People's Republic of China
- Province: Fujian
- Prefecture-level city: Putian
- District: Hanjiang District
- Time zone: UTC+8 (China Standard)

Baisha (Chinese: 白沙) is a town of Hanjiang District, Putian, Fujian, China. As of 2018, it has one residential community and 12 villages under its administration.
