= Jingxi Subdistrict, Sanming =

Jingxi Subdistrict 荆西街道
- Subdistrict
- Location in Fujian Jingxi (China)
- Coordinates: 26°11′42″N 117°32′49″E
- Country: People's Republic of China
- Province: Fujian
- Prefecture-level city: Sanming
- District: Sanyuan District
- Time zone: UTC+8 (China Standard)

Jingxi Subdistrict (Chinese: 荆西街道; pinyin: Jīngxī Jiēdào) is a subdistrict in Sanyuan District, Sanming, Fujian province, China. As of 2020, it administers two residential neighborhoods and two villages:

Neighborhoods

- Jingxi Community
- Jingdong Community (荆东社区)

Villages

- Jingxi Village
- Jingdong Village (荆东村)

== See also ==
- List of township-level divisions of Fujian
