= Linxia =

Linxia (simplified Chinese: 临夏; traditional Chinese: 臨夏) may refer to:

- Linxia Hui Autonomous Prefecture (临夏回族自治州)
  - Linxia City (临夏市), county-level city in Linxia Prefecture
  - Linxia County (临夏县), county in Linxia Prefecture

== See also ==
- Lingxia (disambiguation)
