= Hanxi Subdistrict =

Hanxi Subdistrict 涵西街道
- Subdistrict
- Location in Fujian Hanxi (China)
- Coordinates: 25.4525°N 119.1101°E
- Country: People's Republic of China
- Province: Fujian
- Prefecture-level city: Putian
- District: Hanjiang District
- Time zone: UTC+8 (China Standard)

Hanxi Subdistrict (Chinese: 涵西街道; pinyin: Hánxī Jiēdào) is a subdistrict in Hanjiang District, Putian, Fujian province, China. As of 2020, it has 10 residential communities under its administration:

- Hanxi Community
- Xiaoyi Community (孝义社区)
- Qingnian Community (青年社区)
- Qianjie Community (前街社区)
- Yanning Community (延宁社区)
- Louxia Community (楼下社区)
- Baowei Community (保尾社区)
- Shangcheng Community (商城社区)
- Canglin Community (苍林社区)
- Qunying Community (群英社区)

== See also ==
- List of township-level divisions of Fujian
