= Huilong Township, Fujian =

Huilong Township 回龙乡
- Township
- Location in Fujian Huilong Township (China)
- Coordinates: 27°28′36″N 118°23′59″E
- Country: People's Republic of China
- Province: Fujian
- Prefecture-level city: Nanping
- County-level city: Jianyang
- Village-level divisions: 12 villages
- Elevation: 173 m (568 ft)
- Time zone: UTC+8 (China Standard)
- Area code: 0599

Huilong Township (simplified Chinese: 回龙乡; traditional Chinese: 回龍鄉; pinyin: Huílóng Xiāng) is a township of Jianyang City in northwestern Fujian province, China, located about 31 kilometres (19 mi) northeast of downtown Jianyang as the crow flies. As of 2011, it has 12 villages under its administration.

== See also ==
- List of township-level divisions of Fujian
