= Xuanhe Township =

Xuanhe Township 宣和乡
- Township
- Location in Fujian Xuanhe Township (China)
- Coordinates: 25°36′43″N 116°38′35″E
- Country: People's Republic of China
- Province: Fujian
- Prefecture-level city: Longyan
- County: Liancheng County
- Time zone: UTC+8 (China Standard)

Xuanhe Township (simplified Chinese: 宣和乡; traditional Chinese: 宣和鄉; pinyin: Xuānhé Xiāng) is a township in Liancheng County, Heihe, Fujian, China. As of 2020, it has thirteen villages under its administration:

- Xincao Village (新曹村)
- Zhongcao Village (中曹村)
- Shangcao Village (上曹村)
- Xiacao Village (下曹村)
- Chengxi Village (城溪村)
- Kenan Village (科南村)
- Yangbei Village (洋贝村)
- Huangsha Village (黄沙村)
- Zhongtian Village (中田村)
- Shengxing Village (升星村)
- Peitian Village (培田村)
- Zilin Village (紫林村)
- Qianjin Village (前进村)
