= Shangqing Township, Taining County =

Shangqing Township 上青乡
- township
- Location in Fujian Shangqing Township (China)
- Coordinates: 27.0363°N 117.1739°E
- Country: People's Republic of China
- Province: Fujian
- Prefecture-level city: Sanming
- County: Taining County
- Time zone: UTC+8 (China Standard)

Shangqing Township (Chinese: 上青乡; pinyin: Shàngqīng Xiāng) is a township in Taining County, Sanming, Fujian province, China. As of 2018, it has 8 villages under its administration.

== See also ==
- List of township-level divisions of Fujian
