= Yanbei Subdistrict, Yong'an =

Yanbei Subdistrict 燕北街道
- Subdistrict
- Location in Fujian Yanbei Subdistrict (China)
- Coordinates: 25.9778°N 117.3633°E
- Country: People's Republic of China
- Province: Fujian
- Prefecture-level city: Sanming
- County-level city: Yong'an
- Time zone: UTC+8 (China Standard)

Yanbei Subdistrict (Chinese: 燕北街道; pinyin: Yànběi Jiēdào) is a subdistrict in Yong'an, Fujian, China. As of 2020, it administers the following four residential neighborhoods and six villages:

Neighborhoods

- Huangshan (黄山)
- Houxiyang (后溪洋)
- Hongbin (江滨)
- Hongshan (红山)

Villages

- Xikeng Village (西坑村)
- Xiying Village (西营村)
- Xingping Village (兴平村)
- Banwei Village (坂尾村)
- Yikou Village (益口村)
- Feiqiao Village (飞桥村)

== See also ==
- List of township-level divisions of Fujian
