= Donghai Subdistrict, Quanzhou =

Donghai Subdistrict 东海街道
- Subdistrict
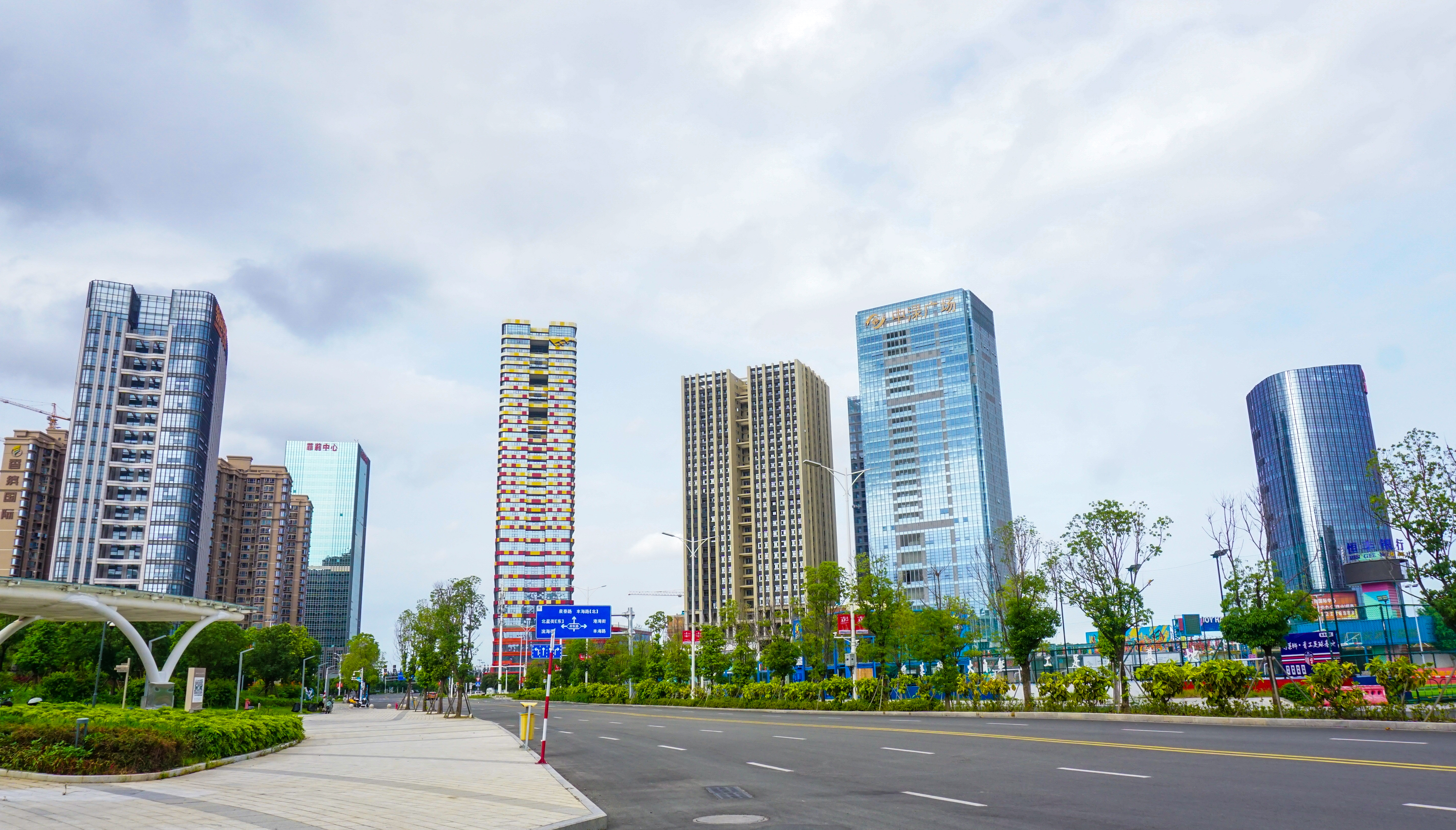

- Location in Fujian Donghai Subdistrict (China)
- Coordinates: 24°52′57″N 118°37′10″E
- Country: People's Republic of China
- Province: Fujian
- Prefecture-level city: Quanzhou
- District: Fengze District
- Time zone: UTC+8 (China Standard)

Donghai Subdistrict (simplified Chinese: 东海街道; traditional Chinese: 東海街道; pinyin: Dōnghǎi Jiēdào) is a subdistrict in Fengze District, Quanzhou, China. As of 2023, it administers the following eighteen residential communities:

- Fashi Community (法石社区)
- Yungu Community (云谷社区)
- Yunshan Community (云山社区)
- Daping Community (大坪社区)
- Baoshan Community (宝山社区)
- Houcuo Community (后厝社区)
- Houting Community (后亭社区)
- Beixing Community (北星社区)
- Dongmei Community (东梅社区)
- Houpu Community (后埔社区)
- Jinqi Community (金崎社区)
- Xunpu Community (浔埔社区)
- Bincheng Community (滨城社区)
- Baoshanhuayuan Community (宝珊花园社区)
- Haijing Community (海景社区)
- Qianyi Community (千亿社区)
- Binhai Community (滨海社区)
- Feicui Community (翡翠社区)

== See also ==
- List of township-level divisions of Fujian
