= Daqiao, Fujian =

Daqiao 大桥镇
- Town
- Location in Fujian Daqiao (China)
- Coordinates: 26°37′02″N 118°54′35″E
- Country: People's Republic of China
- Province: Fujian
- Prefecture-level city: Ningde
- County: Gutian
- Elevation: 435 m (1,427 ft)
- Time zone: UTC+8 (China Standard)

Daqiao (simplified Chinese: 大桥; traditional Chinese: 大橋; pinyin: Dàqiáo; lit. 'great or large bridge') is a town of Gutian County in mountainous northeastern Fujian province, China, located 17 kilometres (11 mi) east-northeast of the county seat in the west-central part of the county. As of 2018, it has 36 villages under its administration.

== See also ==
- List of township-level divisions of Fujian
