= Baitang, Fujian =

Baitang 白塘镇
- Town
- Location in Fujian Baitang (China)
- Coordinates: 25°26′52″N 119°06′03″E
- Country: People's Republic of China
- Province: Fujian
- Prefecture-level city: Putian
- District: Hanjiang
- Elevation: 8.8 m (29 ft)
- Time zone: UTC+8 (China Standard)
- Area code: 0594

Baitang (Chinese: 白塘; pinyin: Báitáng) is a town of Hanjiang District, Putian, midway along the Taiwan Strait coast of Fujian province, China. As of 2011, it has 16 villages under its administration.

== See also ==
- List of township-level divisions of Fujian
