= Jianning County =

Jianning County 建宁县 Kienning; Chienning
- County
- Location of the seat in Fujian
- Coordinates: 26.831°N 116.846°E
- Country: People's Republic of China
- Province: Fujian
- Prefecture-level city: Sanming
- Time zone: UTC+8 (China Standard)

Jianning (simplified Chinese: 建宁县; traditional Chinese: 建寧縣; pinyin: Jiànníng Xiàn; lit. 'build peace') lies in the municipal region of Sanming, Fujian province, China.

== Transportation ==
Jianning is rather remote; its county-town Suicheng (濉城) is serviced only by three provincially maintained roads, namely:

- east to Taining county-town
- south to Ninghua county-town
- west to the watershed/provincial border, whence north to Nanfeng county town, Jiangxi

On September 26, 2013, the Xiangtang–Putian Railway entered service, connecting Jianning to China's railway network.

== Administration ==
=== Towns (镇, zhen) ===
Other than the county seat Suicheng, Jianning has only three towns:

- Lixin (里心)
- Xikou (溪口)
- Junkou (均口)

=== Townships (乡, xiang) ===
There are six townships:

- Xiyuan (溪源)
- Huangfang (黄坊)
- Huangbu (黄埠)
- Kefang (客坊)
- Yijia (伊家)
- Jinxi (金溪)

== Climate ==
Climate data for Jianning, elevation 342 m (1,122 ft), (1991–2020 normals, extremes 1981–present)
Month	Jan	Feb	Mar	Apr	May	Jun	Jul	Aug	Sep	Oct	Nov	Dec	Year
Record high °C (°F)	27.9 (82.2)	32.7 (90.9)	32.1 (89.8)	34.5 (94.1)	36.4 (97.5)	36.9 (98.4)	40.3 (104.5)	40.7 (105.3)	38.0 (100.4)	39.9 (103.8)	32.8 (91.0)	28.0 (82.4)	40.7 (105.3)
Mean daily maximum °C (°F)	12.1 (53.8)	15.0 (59.0)	18.2 (64.8)	24.1 (75.4)	27.9 (82.2)	30.3 (86.5)	33.6 (92.5)	33.2 (91.8)	30.1 (86.2)	25.7 (78.3)	20.4 (68.7)	14.6 (58.3)	23.8 (74.8)
Daily mean °C (°F)	6.2 (43.2)	8.9 (48.0)	12.4 (54.3)	18.0 (64.4)	22.1 (71.8)	25.1 (77.2)	27.4 (81.3)	26.7 (80.1)	23.8 (74.8)	18.8 (65.8)	13.4 (56.1)	7.8 (46.0)	17.6 (63.6)
Mean daily minimum °C (°F)	2.8 (37.0)	5.2 (41.4)	8.8 (47.8)	14.0 (57.2)	18.3 (64.9)	21.6 (70.9)	23.0 (73.4)	22.9 (73.2)	20.1 (68.2)	14.6 (58.3)	9.2 (48.6)	3.8 (38.8)	13.7 (56.6)
Record low °C (°F)	−8.2 (17.2)	−5.6 (21.9)	−5.1 (22.8)	1.9 (35.4)	8.4 (47.1)	12.5 (54.5)	17.7 (63.9)	16.8 (62.2)	9.1 (48.4)	1.5 (34.7)	−4.7 (23.5)	−12.8 (9.0)	−12.8 (9.0)
Average precipitation mm (inches)	82.7 (3.26)	109.9 (4.33)	230.5 (9.07)	221.3 (8.71)	277.4 (10.92)	342.7 (13.49)	167.3 (6.59)	167.0 (6.57)	76.6 (3.02)	58.2 (2.29)	77.3 (3.04)	64.7 (2.55)	1,875.6 (73.84)
Average precipitation days (≥ 0.1 mm)	13.8	15.0	19.9	18.5	19.3	18.6	13.4	15.1	11.5	8.7	10.0	11.3	175.1
Average snowy days	2.2	1.3	0.3	0	0	0	0	0	0	0	0	0.6	4.4
Average relative humidity (%)	85	84	85	83	83	83	79	81	82	82	84	82	83
Mean monthly sunshine hours	81.3	80.3	78.7	101.6	121.1	126.1	224.8	192.0	150.9	144.2	119.4	112.3	1,532.7
Percentage possible sunshine	25	25	21	26	29	30	54	48	41	41	37	35	34
Source: China Meteorological Administration
