= Xiyuan Subdistrict, Jinjiang =

Coordinates: 24.818681°N 118.546265°E

Xiyuan Subdistrict 西园街道
- Subdistrict

Chinese transcription(s)
  - Chinese: 西园街道
  - Pinyin: Xīyuán Jiēdào
- Interactive map of Xiyuan Subdistrict
- Country: China
- Province: Fujian
- Prefecture: Quanzhou
- County-level city: Jinjiang
- Time zone: UTC+8 (China Standard Time)

Xiyuan Subdistrict (Chinese: 西园街道) is a township-level division of Jinjiang City, Quanzhou, Fujian Province, China.

== See also ==
- List of township-level divisions of Fujian
