= Yongxing, Fujian =

Coordinates: 27.92752°N 118.37432°E

Yongxing 永兴镇
- Town

Chinese transcription(s)
- Interactive map of Yongxing
- Country: China
- Province: Fujian
- Prefecture: Nanping
- County: Pucheng County
- Time zone: UTC+8 (China Standard Time)

Yongxing (Chinese: 永兴; pinyin: Yǒngxīng) is a township-level division situated in Pucheng County, Nanping, Fujian, China.

== See also ==
- List of township-level divisions of Fujian
