= Baisha Subdistrict, Sanming =

Baisha Subdistrict 白沙街道
- Subdistrict
- Location in Fujian Baisha Subdistrict (China)
- Coordinates: 26.2401°N 117.6104°E
- Country: People's Republic of China
- Province: Fujian
- Prefecture-level city: Sanming
- District: Sanyuan District
- Time zone: UTC+8 (China Standard)

Baisha Subdistrict (Chinese: 白沙街道; pinyin: Báishā Jiēdào) is a subdistrict in Sanyuan District, Sanming, Fujian, China. As of 2018, it has 7 residential communities under its administration.

== See also ==
- List of township-level divisions of Fujian
