= Pangu Township, Fujian =

Pangu Township 盘谷乡
- Township
- Location in Fujian Pangu Township (China)
- Coordinates: 25°58′34″N 118°48′12″E
- Country: People's Republic of China
- Province: Fujian
- Prefecture-level city: Fuzhou
- County: Yongtai County
- Village-level divisions: 6 villages
- Time zone: UTC+8 (China Standard)

Pangu Township (simplified Chinese: 盘谷乡; traditional Chinese: 盤谷鄉; pinyin: Pángǔ Xiāng) is a township of Yongtai County in eastern Fujian province, China. As of 2023, it has six villages under its administration: Fuping Village (福坪村), Shuiwei Village (水尾村), Yangli Village (洋里村), Guan Village (官村), Rongyang Village (荣阳村), and Xinfeng Village (新丰村).

== See also ==
- List of township-level divisions of Fujian
