= Xinqiao, Changting County =

Xinqiao 新桥镇
- Town
- Location in Fujian Xinqiao (China)
- Coordinates: 25°52′43″N 116°27′17″E
- Country: People's Republic of China
- Province: Fujian
- Prefecture-level city: Longyan
- County: Changting
- Elevation: 343 m (1,125 ft)
- Time zone: UTC+8 (China Standard)
- Area code: 0597

Xinqiao (simplified Chinese: 新桥; traditional Chinese: 新橋; pinyin: Xīnqiáo; lit. 'new bridge') is a town of Changting County in mountainous western Fujian province, China. It is about 10 kilometres (6.2 mi) northeast of the county seat. As of 2011, it administered 20 villages.

== See also ==
- List of township-level divisions of Fujian
