= Tieshan Subdistrict, Longyan =

Tieshan Subdistrict 铁山街道
- Subdistrict
- Location in Fujian Tieshan Subdistrict (China)
- Coordinates: 25°8′14″N 117°3′25″E
- Country: People's Republic of China
- Province: Fujian
- Prefecture-level city: Longyan
- District: Xinluo District
- Time zone: UTC+8 (China Standard)

Tieshan Subdistrict (simplified Chinese: 铁山街道; traditional Chinese: 鐵山街道; pinyin: Tiěshān Jiēdào) is a subdistrict in Xinluo District, Longyan, Fujian, China. As of 2020, it administers Jianlong Residential Community (见龙社区) and the following nineteen villages:

- Yangtou Village (洋头村)
- Waiyang Village (外洋村)
- Xixi Village (溪西村)
- Yangmei Village (洋美村)
- Gekou Village (隔口村)
- Linbang Village (林邦村)
- Fuxi Village (富溪村)
- Pinglin Village (平林村)
- Lujiadi Village (陆家地村)
- Linghou Village (岭后村)
- Zengping Village (增坪村)
- Lijiu Village (李九村)
- Xuling Village (许岭村)
- Xiejiabang Village (谢家邦村)
- Chenluo Village (陈罗村)
- Xiacunban Village (下村坂村)
- Baiyanqian Village (白岩前村)
- Luocuoshan Village (罗厝山村)
- Huodekeng Village (火德坑村)

== See also ==
- List of township-level divisions of Fujian
