= Yannan Subdistrict, Yong'an =

Yannan Subdistrict 燕南街道
- Subdistrict
- Location in Fujian Yannan Subdistrict (China)
- Coordinates: 25.9700°N 117.3639°E
- Country: People's Republic of China
- Province: Fujian
- Prefecture-level city: Sanming
- County-level city: Yong'an
- Time zone: UTC+8 (China Standard)

Yannan Subdistrict (Chinese: 燕南街道; pinyin: Yànnán Jiēdào) is a subdistrict in Yong'an, Fujian, China. As of 2020, it administers the following nine residential neighborhoods and eight villages:

Neighborhoods

- Taiping (太平)
- Baxiwan (巴溪湾)
- Nanta (南塔)
- Longling (龙岭)
- Jiannan (建南)
- Yimin (益民)
- Wusi (五四)
- Ma'an (马鞍)
- Jiangjunshan Community (将军山社区)

Villages

- Nanjiao Village (南郊村)
- Maoping Village (茅坪村)
- Yongjiang Village (永浆村)
- Puling Village (埔岭村)
- Huangli Village (黄历村)
- Guikou Village (桂口村)
- Jifeng Village (吉峰村)
- Luoxi Village (洛溪村)

== See also ==
- List of township-level divisions of Fujian
