= Tantou, Changle =

Coordinates: 26.0225°N 119.6024°E

Tantou (Chinese: 潭头; pinyin: Tántóu) is a town located in the county-level city of Changle, Fuzhou City, Fujian, China.

A large part of the town's population lives abroad, mainly in New York City (Chinatown, Manhattan), Europe (Chinatowns in Europe), and Taiwan.

== See also ==
- List of township-level divisions of Fujian
