= Huangkeng, Fujian =

Huangkeng 黄坑镇
- Town
- Location in Fujian Huangkeng (China)
- Coordinates: 27°34′20″N 117°39′13″E
- Country: People's Republic of China
- Province: Fujian
- Prefecture-level city: Nanping
- County-level city: Jianyang
- Time zone: UTC+8 (China Standard)
- Postal code: 354200
- Area code: 0599

Huangkeng (simplified Chinese: 黄坑; traditional Chinese: 黃坑; pinyin: Huángkēng) is a town of Jianyang City, in the northwest of Fujian province, China. It is located west of Jianyang's main urban area and connected with Shaowu and the Wuyi Mountains, a UNESCO World Heritage Site. Historically, Huangkeng has also been called Tanshili and Jiaheli in different ancient dynasties. The name Huangkeng comes from a poem, and likens the appearance of fallen leaves to gold. Zhu Xi's tomb is located in Huangkeng.

Resources in this town include bamboo, mushrooms, water-power and mining. Mount Huang Gang is the tallest mountain in east mainland China.

The population of Huangkeng is approximately 14,000. Huangkeng has large percentage of residents work overseas, especially in Western Europe.

== See also ==
- List of township-level divisions of Fujian
