= Shangqing Township, Anxi County =

Shangqing Township 尚卿乡
- township
- Location in Fujian Shangqing Township (China)
- Coordinates: 25°6′34″N 117°58′3″E
- Country: People's Republic of China
- Province: Fujian
- Prefecture-level city: Quanzhou
- County: Anxi County
- Time zone: UTC+8 (China Standard)

Shangqing Township (Chinese: 尚卿乡; pinyin: Shàngqīng Xiāng) is a township in Anxi County, Quanzhou, Fujian province, China. As of 2018, it has 18 villages under its administration.

== See also ==
- List of township-level divisions of Fujian
