= Lingxia Township =

Lingxia Township 岭下乡
- Township
- Location in Fujian Lingxia Township (China)
- Coordinates: 27°04′26″N 118°57′59″E
- Country: People's Republic of China
- Province: Fujian
- Prefecture-level city: Ningde
- County: Pingnan
- Elevation: 884 m (2,900 ft)
- Time zone: UTC+8 (China Standard)

Lingxia Township (simplified Chinese: 岭下乡; traditional Chinese: 嶺下鄉; pinyin: Lǐngxià Xiāng) is a township of Pingnan County in mountainous northeastern Fujian province, China, located 18 kilometres (11 mi) north of the county seat in the northern reaches of the county. As of 2011, it has 11 villages under its administration.

== See also ==
- List of township-level divisions of Fujian
