= Dongfu, Xiamen =

Town in Fujian, China

Coordinates: 24.5601°N 117.9331°E

Dongfu (Chinese: 东孚镇; pinyin: Dōngfú Zhèn; Pe̍h-ōe-jī: Tong-pū-tìn) is a town in Haicang District, Xiamen, FJ. It has a residential population of 30,733 on an area of 73.6 square kilometres (28.4 sq mi).

== Administration ==
The town executive, CPC sub-branch and PSB sub-station (paichusuo, 派出所) are in Dongpu Village.

=== Villages ===
- Dongpu (东埔) - town centre
- Shanbian 山边
- Zhaihou 寨后
- Guoban 过坂
- Dongyao 东瑶
- Dingmei 鼎美
- Houke 后柯
- Yunwei (芸尾)
- Fengshan 凤山
- Zhendai 贞岱
- Lianhua 莲花
- Hongtang 洪塘

=== Other ===
- Dongfu Orchard (东孚果林场)
