= Mingxi County =

Mingxi County 明溪县 Mingki
- County
- Location in Fujian
- Coordinates: 26°20′N 117°14′E
- Country: People's Republic of China
- Province: Fujian
- Prefecture-level city: Sanming

Area
  - Total: 1,709 km^{2} (660 sq mi)

Population (2020)
  - Total: 98,930
  - Density: 57.89/km^{2} (149.9/sq mi)
- Time zone: UTC+8 (China Standard)
- Postal code: 365200

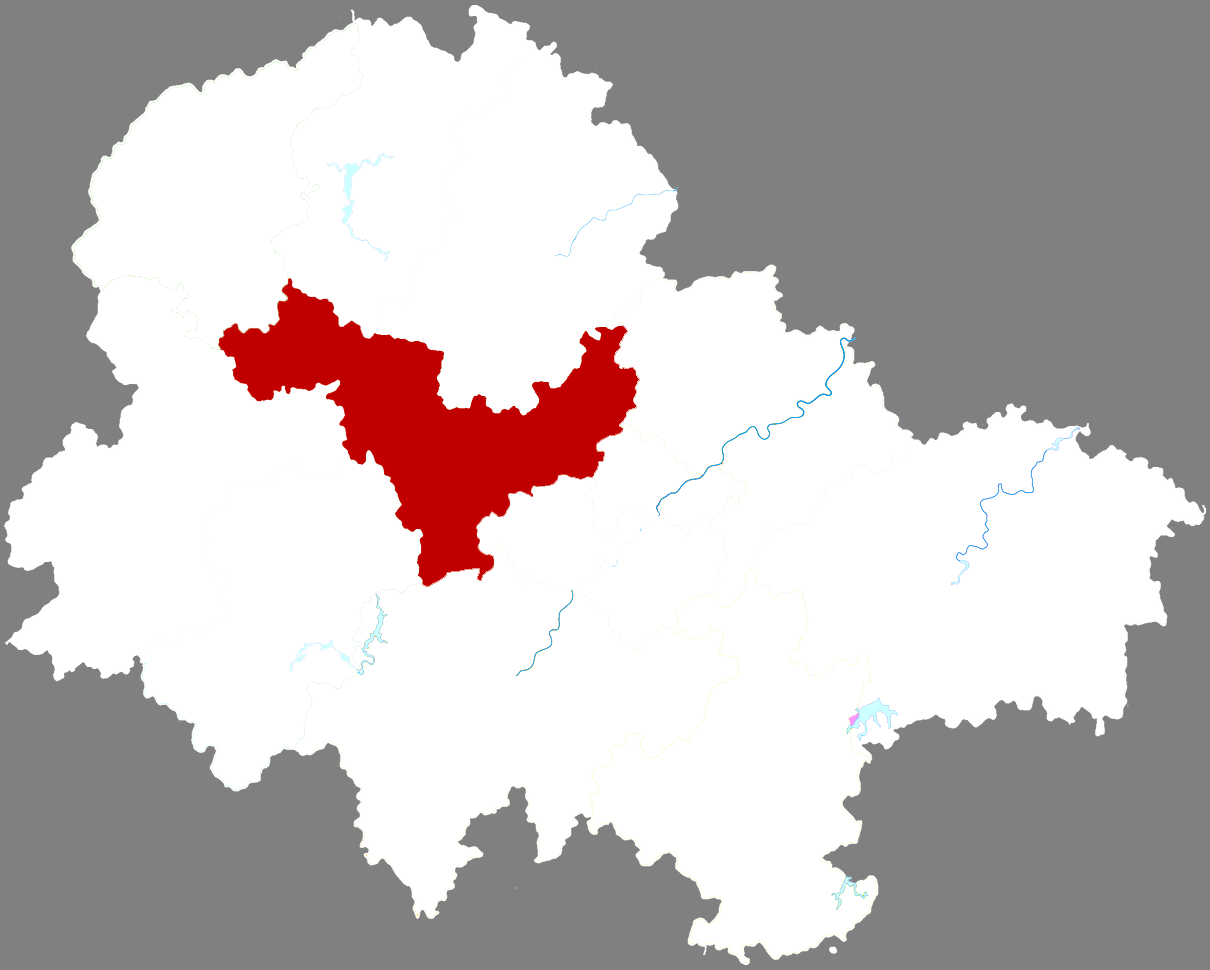
Location of Mingxi county in Sanming city, China

Mingxi County (simplified Chinese: 明溪县; traditional Chinese: 明溪縣; pinyin: Míngxī Xiàn) is a county of Sanming City, Fujian, People's Republic of China.

The county government is located in Xuefeng town.

== Administrative divisions ==
Towns:

- Xuefeng (雪峰镇), Gaiyang (盖洋镇), Hufang (胡坊镇), Hanxian (瀚仙镇)

Townships:

- Chengguan Township (城关乡), Shaxi Township (沙溪乡), Xiayang Township (夏阳乡), Fengxi Township (枫溪乡), Xiafang Township (夏坊乡)

== Climate ==
Climate data for Mingxi, elevation 357 m (1,171 ft), (1991–2020 normals, extremes 1981–present)
Month	Jan	Feb	Mar	Apr	May	Jun	Jul	Aug	Sep	Oct	Nov	Dec	Year
Record high °C (°F)	28.3 (82.9)	31.6 (88.9)	33.7 (92.7)	34.5 (94.1)	35.8 (96.4)	36.7 (98.1)	39.3 (102.7)	39.6 (103.3)	38.1 (100.6)	35.4 (95.7)	33.1 (91.6)	28.2 (82.8)	39.6 (103.3)
Mean daily maximum °C (°F)	14.8 (58.6)	16.9 (62.4)	19.6 (67.3)	24.8 (76.6)	28.1 (82.6)	30.5 (86.9)	33.6 (92.5)	33.2 (91.8)	30.6 (87.1)	26.8 (80.2)	22.0 (71.6)	16.8 (62.2)	24.8 (76.7)
Daily mean °C (°F)	8.7 (47.7)	10.8 (51.4)	13.9 (57.0)	18.8 (65.8)	22.4 (72.3)	25.1 (77.2)	27.2 (81.0)	26.7 (80.1)	24.4 (75.9)	20.0 (68.0)	15.0 (59.0)	9.9 (49.8)	18.6 (65.4)
Mean daily minimum °C (°F)	4.7 (40.5)	6.9 (44.4)	10.1 (50.2)	14.7 (58.5)	18.5 (65.3)	21.5 (70.7)	22.6 (72.7)	22.6 (72.7)	20.2 (68.4)	15.2 (59.4)	10.4 (50.7)	5.5 (41.9)	14.4 (58.0)
Record low °C (°F)	−6.6 (20.1)	−4.5 (23.9)	−4.0 (24.8)	1.4 (34.5)	8.1 (46.6)	11.6 (52.9)	18.8 (65.8)	16.0 (60.8)	10.9 (51.6)	1.9 (35.4)	−3.7 (25.3)	−8.8 (16.2)	−8.8 (16.2)
Average precipitation mm (inches)	75.1 (2.96)	112.3 (4.42)	217.1 (8.55)	214.2 (8.43)	314.1 (12.37)	344.3 (13.56)	151.4 (5.96)	177.2 (6.98)	94.9 (3.74)	58.4 (2.30)	69.6 (2.74)	57.4 (2.26)	1,886 (74.27)
Average precipitation days (≥ 0.1 mm)	12.0	13.6	18.7	17.2	19.2	18.9	13.6	15.9	10.5	7.2	8.2	9.2	164.2
Average snowy days	0.6	0.6	0.1	0	0	0	0	0	0	0	0	0.3	1.6
Average relative humidity (%)	81	82	84	82	83	85	79	81	80	78	80	80	81
Mean monthly sunshine hours	94.7	86.8	84.6	104.6	117.0	123.0	214.0	199.4	162.4	158.2	130.1	121.5	1,596.3
Percentage possible sunshine	37	29	27	23	27	28	30	51	50	44	45	40	38
Source: China Meteorological Administration
