= Taining County =

Taining County 泰宁县
- County
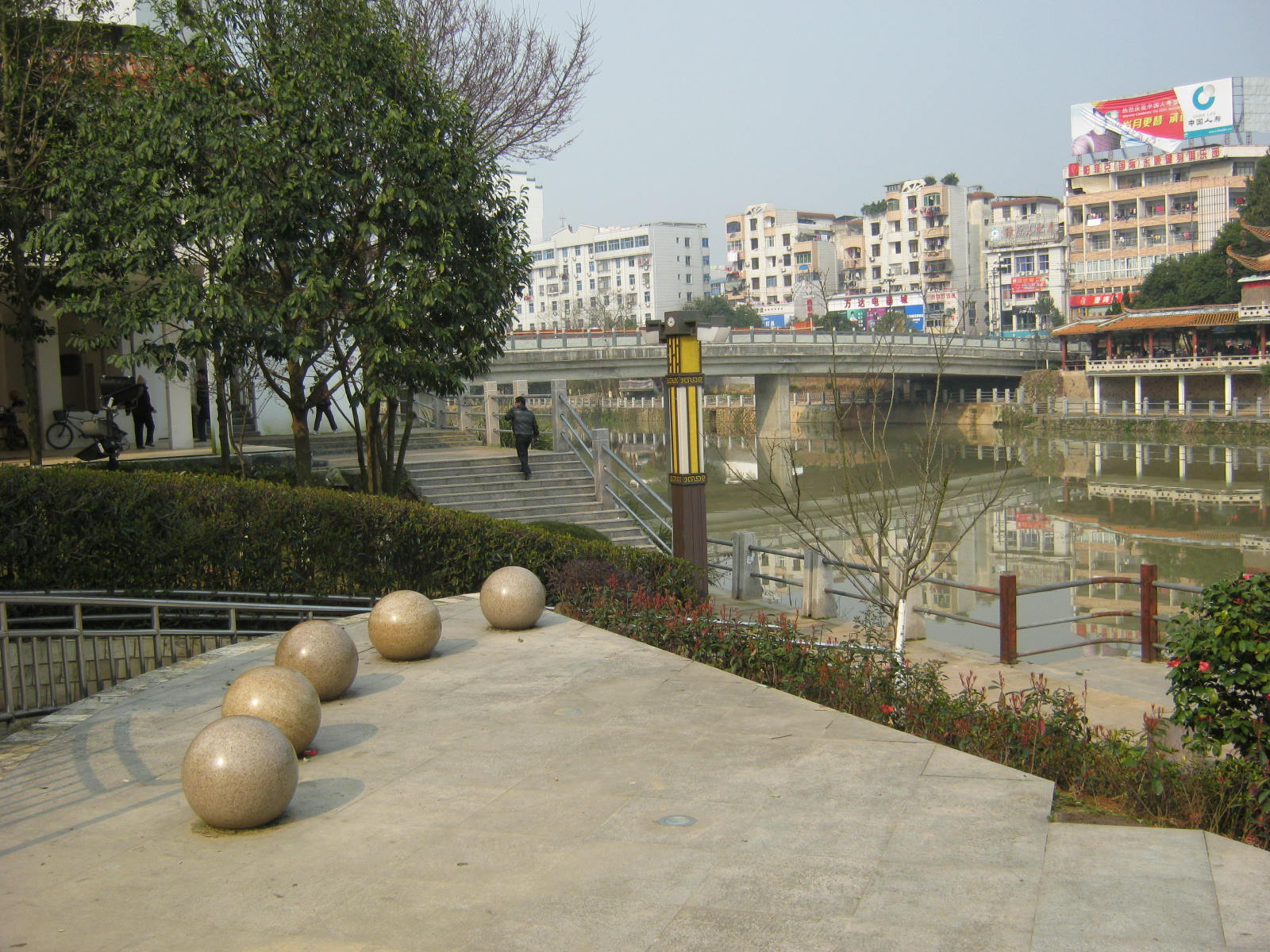
- Tongxin Bridge (同心桥)

- Location in Fujian
- Coordinates: 26°54′01″N 117°10′33″E
- Country: People's Republic of China
- Province: Fujian
- Prefecture-level city: Sanming

Area
  - Total: 1,535 km^{2} (593 sq mi)

Population
  - Total: 130,000
  - Density: 85/km^{2} (220/sq mi)
- Time zone: UTC+8 (China Standard)
- Postal code: 354400

Taining County (simplified Chinese: 泰宁县; traditional Chinese: 泰寧縣; pinyin: Tàiníng Xiàn) is a county in the northwest of Fujian province, People's Republic of China. It is the northernmost county-level division of the prefecture-level city of Sanming. The population is 130,000.

The county government is located in Shancheng town.

The local dialect is a dialect of Gan Chinese, although surrounding areas speak Min Chinese.

== Transportation ==
- Xiangtang–Putian Railway

== Climate ==
Climate data for Taining, elevation 343 m (1,125 ft), (1991–2020 normals, extremes 1981–2010)
Month	Jan	Feb	Mar	Apr	May	Jun	Jul	Aug	Sep	Oct	Nov	Dec	Year
Record high °C (°F)	26.9 (80.4)	32.1 (89.8)	32.1 (89.8)	34.5 (94.1)	34.8 (94.6)	37.3 (99.1)	39.9 (103.8)	39.6 (103.3)	37.5 (99.5)	36.3 (97.3)	31.9 (89.4)	27.4 (81.3)	39.9 (103.8)
Mean daily maximum °C (°F)	12.8 (55.0)	15.3 (59.5)	18.3 (64.9)	23.9 (75.0)	27.7 (81.9)	30.1 (86.2)	33.3 (91.9)	33.0 (91.4)	30.3 (86.5)	26.1 (79.0)	20.8 (69.4)	15.2 (59.4)	23.9 (75.0)
Daily mean °C (°F)	6.9 (44.4)	9.4 (48.9)	12.6 (54.7)	17.9 (64.2)	21.9 (71.4)	24.9 (76.8)	27.2 (81.0)	26.7 (80.1)	24.1 (75.4)	19.3 (66.7)	14.0 (57.2)	8.5 (47.3)	17.8 (64.0)
Mean daily minimum °C (°F)	3.5 (38.3)	5.7 (42.3)	9.1 (48.4)	14.1 (57.4)	18.3 (64.9)	21.5 (70.7)	23.0 (73.4)	22.9 (73.2)	20.3 (68.5)	15.1 (59.2)	9.9 (49.8)	4.5 (40.1)	14.0 (57.2)
Record low °C (°F)	−7.1 (19.2)	−5.1 (22.8)	−4.8 (23.4)	2.0 (35.6)	7.5 (45.5)	11.9 (53.4)	18.2 (64.8)	16.2 (61.2)	10.9 (51.6)	2.2 (36.0)	−3.6 (25.5)	−10.6 (12.9)	−10.6 (12.9)
Average precipitation mm (inches)	79.5 (3.13)	107.4 (4.23)	228.8 (9.01)	221.1 (8.70)	287.8 (11.33)	346.2 (13.63)	160.6 (6.32)	167.1 (6.58)	82.7 (3.26)	54.5 (2.15)	79.5 (3.13)	61.3 (2.41)	1,876.5 (73.88)
Average precipitation days (≥ 0.1 mm)	12.5	14.3	19.5	17.9	18.8	19.0	13.0	15.3	10.6	7.2	8.8	9.9	166.8
Average snowy days	1.3	0.9	0.1	0	0	0	0	0	0	0	0	0.4	2.7
Average relative humidity (%)	85	85	86	84	84	85	79	82	81	80	83	83	83
Mean monthly sunshine hours	83.6	80.4	78.4	95.7	115.1	115.2	215.4	187.2	158.6	154.6	120.4	114.0	1,518.6
Percentage possible sunshine	25	25	21	25	28	28	51	47	43	44	37	35	34
Source: China Meteorological Administration

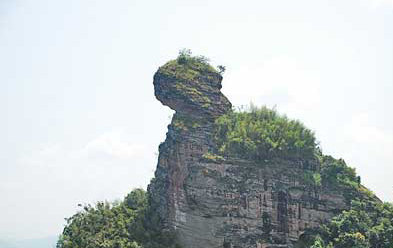
Cat Mountain in Taining

== Administrative divisions ==
Towns:

- Shancheng (杉城镇), Zhukou (朱口镇), Xiaqu Town (下渠镇)

Townships:

- Xinqiao Township (新桥乡), Shangqing Township (上青乡), Datian Township (大田乡), Meikou Township (梅口乡), Kaishan Township (开善乡), Dalong Township (大龙乡)

== Culture ==
Due to the presence of the Wuyi Mountains, Taining County includes a number of notable parks of various types. One of them, located in the central part of the range, after having been made a World Heritage Site, and qualifying as a UNESCO National Geopark, was certified in 2004 as a UNESCO Global Geopark in the Asia Pacific regional network.

== See also ==
- Wuyishan, Fujian
- Wuyi New Area
