= Hanjiang, Putian =

Hanjiang 涵江区 Hankiang; Hankong; Hanchiang
- District
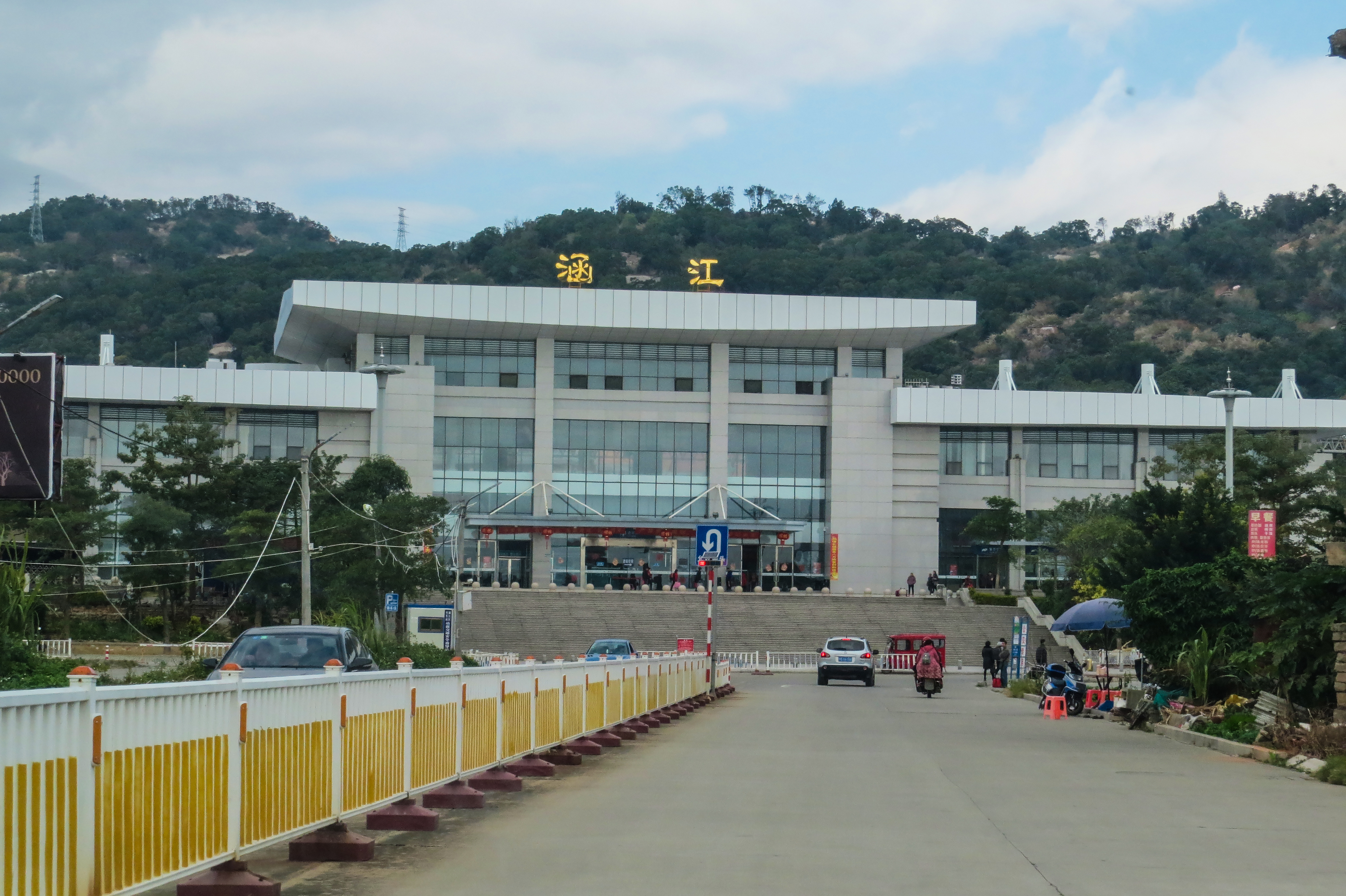

- Location in Fujian
- Coordinates: 25°27′31″N 119°06′59″E
- Country: People's Republic of China
- Province: Fujian
- Prefecture-level city: Putian

Area
  - Total: 753.9 km^{2} (291.1 sq mi)

Population (2020)
  - Total: 479,605
  - Density: 636.2/km^{2} (1,648/sq mi)
- Time zone: UTC+8 (China Standard)
- Division code: HJQ

Hanjiang (Hanjiang; Chinese: 涵江; pinyin: Hánjiāng) is a district of Putian, Fujian province, People's Republic of China. It ranges in latitude from 25°23' to 25° 27'N and longitude from 119° 04' to 119°10'E. It is located in the middle of the Fujian coast, bordering the Taiwan Strait to the east, south to "triangle of the gold austral Fujian".

== History ==
In 627, Hanjiang was originally named "Hantou," meaning it was the head of a sluice built during that time. During the Song dynasty, it was later given the name "Hanjiang."

== Administrative divisions ==
Hanjiang is composed of two subdistricts, nine towns, and one township. These include Handong Subdistrict (涵东街道), Hanxi Subdistrict (涵西街道), Sanjiangkou Town (三江口镇), Baitang Town (白塘镇), Guohuan Town (国欢镇), Jiangkou Town (江口镇), Wutang Town (梧塘镇), Qiulu Town (萩芦镇), Baisha Town (白沙镇), Zhuangbian Town (庄边镇), Xinxian Town (新县镇), and Dayang Township (大洋乡). The district also includes the Chigang Development Zone (赤港开发区). The district government is located in Handong Subdistrict.

== Geography ==
With a total area of about 752 square kilometers, Hanjiang is located north of the Mulan Stream estuary and west of Xinghua Bay. Several major transportation routes pass through the district, including National Road 324, the Fuzhou–Xiamen Highway, Xingyou Highway, the Fuzhou–Xiamen Railway, and the Xiangpu Railway. Hanjiang Railway Station is situated in Jiangkou Town.

=== Climate ===
Hanjiang has a monsoonal subtropical marine climate, characterised by long, cool and humid summers and short, mild and dry winters. The average annual temperature is 20.2 °C, with an annual sunlight of 1943 hours and annual precipitation of 1,289mm.

== Demographics ==
According to the 2010 census, Hanjiang has a population of 470,097 inhabitants, or 16.92% of the population of Putian.

== Natural resources ==
=== Mineral resources ===
The Hanjiang district has abundant non-metal mineral deposits: reserves of brick and tile clay reach one hundred million tons; granite is over one million cubic meters; and construction sand and mineral water are also plentiful.

=== Living resources ===
Hanjiang is a part of Mulan Stream Plain, which is rich in rice, wheat, sweet potato, soybean, peanut and vegetable. Lychee, longan, loquat, and persimmon are the four main fruits. Seafood such as oysters, sea worms, clams, fish, octopus, especially eel and prawns are well-known both inside and outside the province.

=== Geothermal resources ===
The geothermal water temperature is between 30 °C and 60 °C, which is a very favourable temperature to exploit.

=== Port resources ===
Hanjiang has a good natural harbour—Hanjiang Harbour, whose total water line around Xinghua Bay is 19.6 kilometers and the whole Channel length is 43.88 kilometers. The convenient navigation helped the formation of Sanjiangkou Bay and Jiangkou operation area in the history.

== Economy ==
By 2008, Hanjiang's GDP amounted to 17.83 billion yuan, an increase of 18.7%. The first, second, and third industry respectively added value 1219 million yuan, 1291 million yuan, and 3701 million yuan, with increases of 6.4%, 22.1%, and 11.4%.
