= Liancheng County =

Liancheng County 连城县 Liencheng
- County
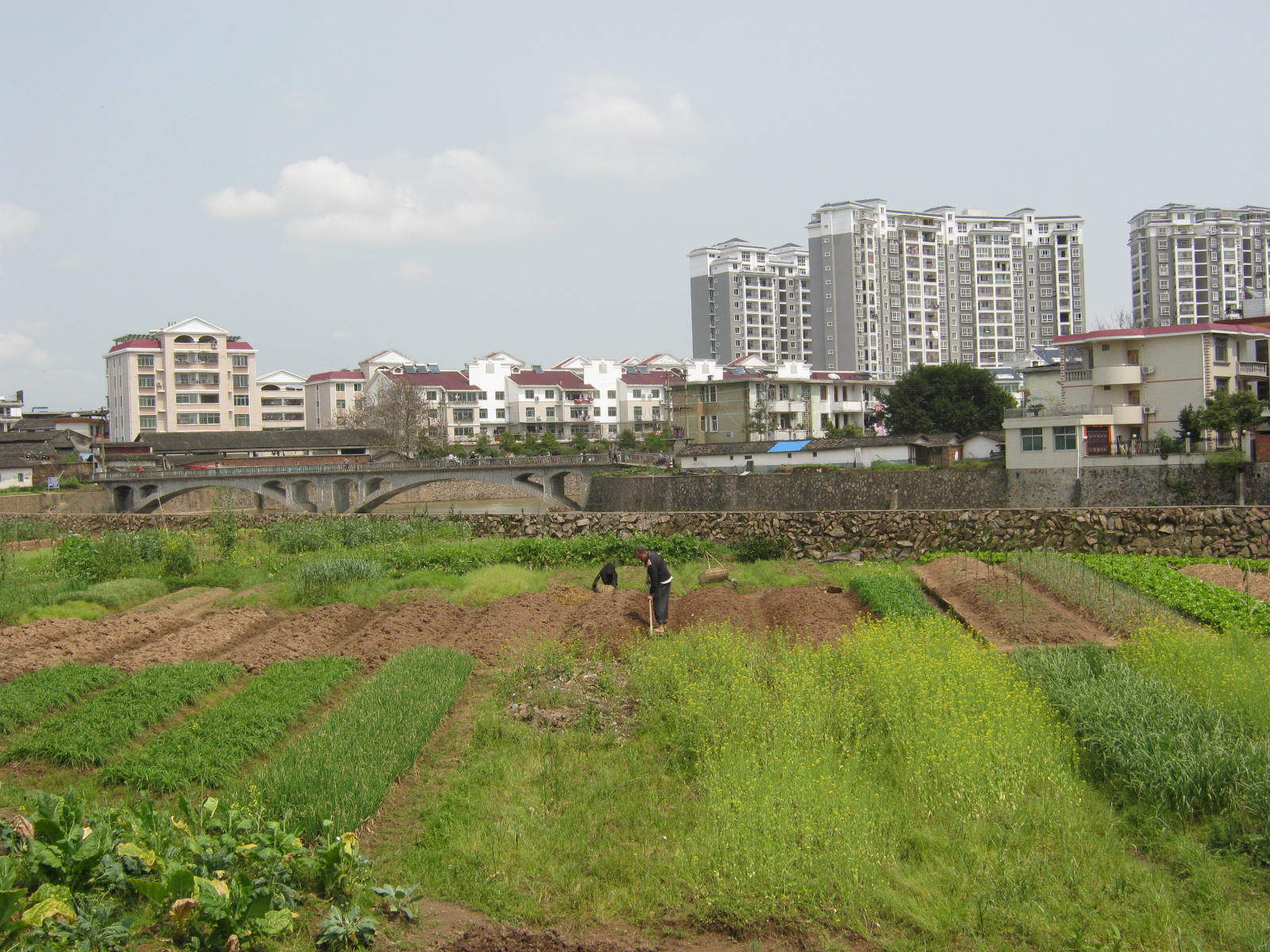

- Location of the seat in Fujian
- Coordinates: 25°34′N 116°47′E
- Country: People's Republic of China
- Province: Fujian
- Prefecture-level city: Longyan

Area
  - Total: 2,582 km^{2} (997 sq mi)

Population (2020)
  - Total: 250,518
  - Density: 97.02/km^{2} (251.3/sq mi)
- Time zone: UTC+8 (China Standard)

Liancheng County (simplified Chinese: 连城县; traditional Chinese: 連城縣; pinyin: Liánchéng Xiàn) is a county in the municipal region of Longyan, Fujian, People's Republic of China.

== Geography ==
Liancheng borders Changting and Shanghang counties to the west and south, and Xinluo, the municipal seat, to the southeast. Sanming Municipality's Yong'an City and Qingliu County lie to the east and northeast. Two watersheds meet here, with most of the county's rivers flowing north and east to the Min River and the East China Sea, and the remainder flowing southwest to the Ting River system and the South China Sea.

== Climate ==
Climate data for Liancheng, elevation 404 m (1,325 ft), (1991–2020 normals, extremes 1991–present)
Month	Jan	Feb	Mar	Apr	May	Jun	Jul	Aug	Sep	Oct	Nov	Dec	Year
Record high °C (°F)	27.4 (81.3)	30.2 (86.4)	31.0 (87.8)	34.6 (94.3)	35.7 (96.3)	37.1 (98.8)	40.0 (104.0)	39.5 (103.1)	37.0 (98.6)	35.5 (95.9)	33.4 (92.1)	27.9 (82.2)	40.0 (104.0)
Mean daily maximum °C (°F)	15.2 (59.4)	17.2 (63.0)	19.9 (67.8)	24.7 (76.5)	28.1 (82.6)	30.3 (86.5)	33.1 (91.6)	32.7 (90.9)	30.5 (86.9)	26.7 (80.1)	22.2 (72.0)	16.9 (62.4)	24.8 (76.6)
Daily mean °C (°F)	9.5 (49.1)	11.8 (53.2)	14.9 (58.8)	19.8 (67.6)	23.2 (73.8)	25.7 (78.3)	27.5 (81.5)	27.0 (80.6)	25.0 (77.0)	20.9 (69.6)	16.2 (61.2)	10.9 (51.6)	19.4 (66.9)
Mean daily minimum °C (°F)	5.8 (42.4)	8.2 (46.8)	11.4 (52.5)	16.1 (61.0)	19.8 (67.6)	22.6 (72.7)	23.7 (74.7)	23.4 (74.1)	21.2 (70.2)	16.6 (61.9)	11.9 (53.4)	6.8 (44.2)	15.6 (60.1)
Record low °C (°F)	−6.4 (20.5)	−3.4 (25.9)	−1.5 (29.3)	3.0 (37.4)	11.7 (53.1)	13.5 (56.3)	19.7 (67.5)	18.6 (65.5)	13.5 (56.3)	6.4 (43.5)	−1.4 (29.5)	−7.2 (19.0)	−7.2 (19.0)
Average precipitation mm (inches)	74.5 (2.93)	108.2 (4.26)	194.6 (7.66)	204.1 (8.04)	255.4 (10.06)	272.1 (10.71)	132.7 (5.22)	192.7 (7.59)	92.0 (3.62)	52.2 (2.06)	59.2 (2.33)	55.5 (2.19)	1,693.2 (66.67)
Average precipitation days (≥ 0.1 mm)	10.6	13.2	18.3	17.0	17.9	18.0	14.1	16.3	11.2	6.6	7.7	8.6	159.5
Average snowy days	0.4	0.4	0	0	0	0	0	0	0	0	0	0.2	1
Average relative humidity (%)	77	78	80	78	79	80	74	77	77	73	75	75	77
Mean monthly sunshine hours	103.9	89.8	82.6	103.4	114.1	122.9	205.9	185.2	161.6	165.1	143.9	128.6	1,607
Percentage possible sunshine	31	28	22	27	27	30	49	46	44	47	44	39	36
Source: China Meteorological Administration

== Transportation ==
Liancheng county is crossed by National Route 205 (Yong'an downtown--Shanghang centre). The Ganzhou–Longyan Railway passes through Liancheng.

== Sights ==
In 2005 Peitian, an 800-year-old village, was designated as "National Historical and Cultural Village".

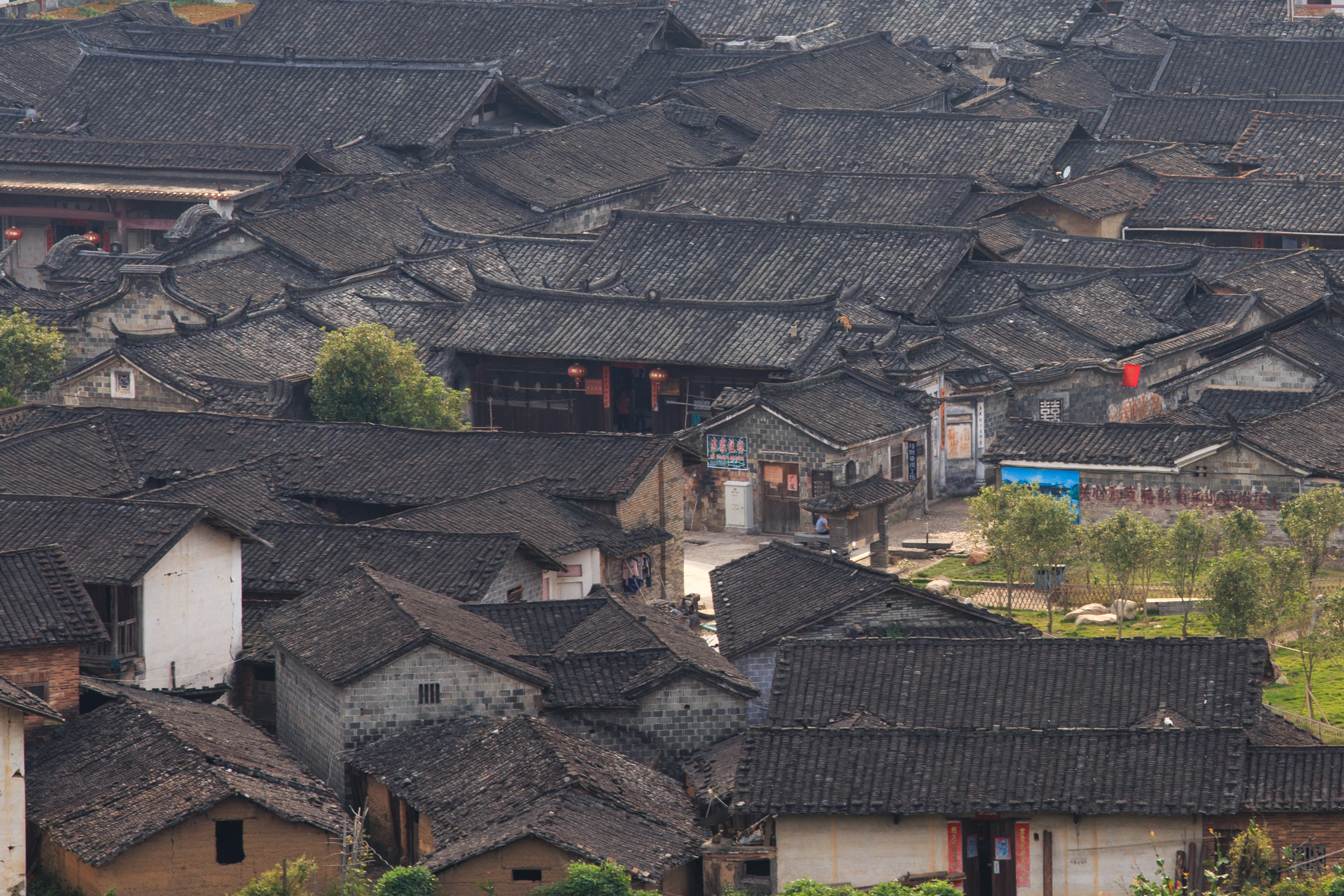
Peitian Village

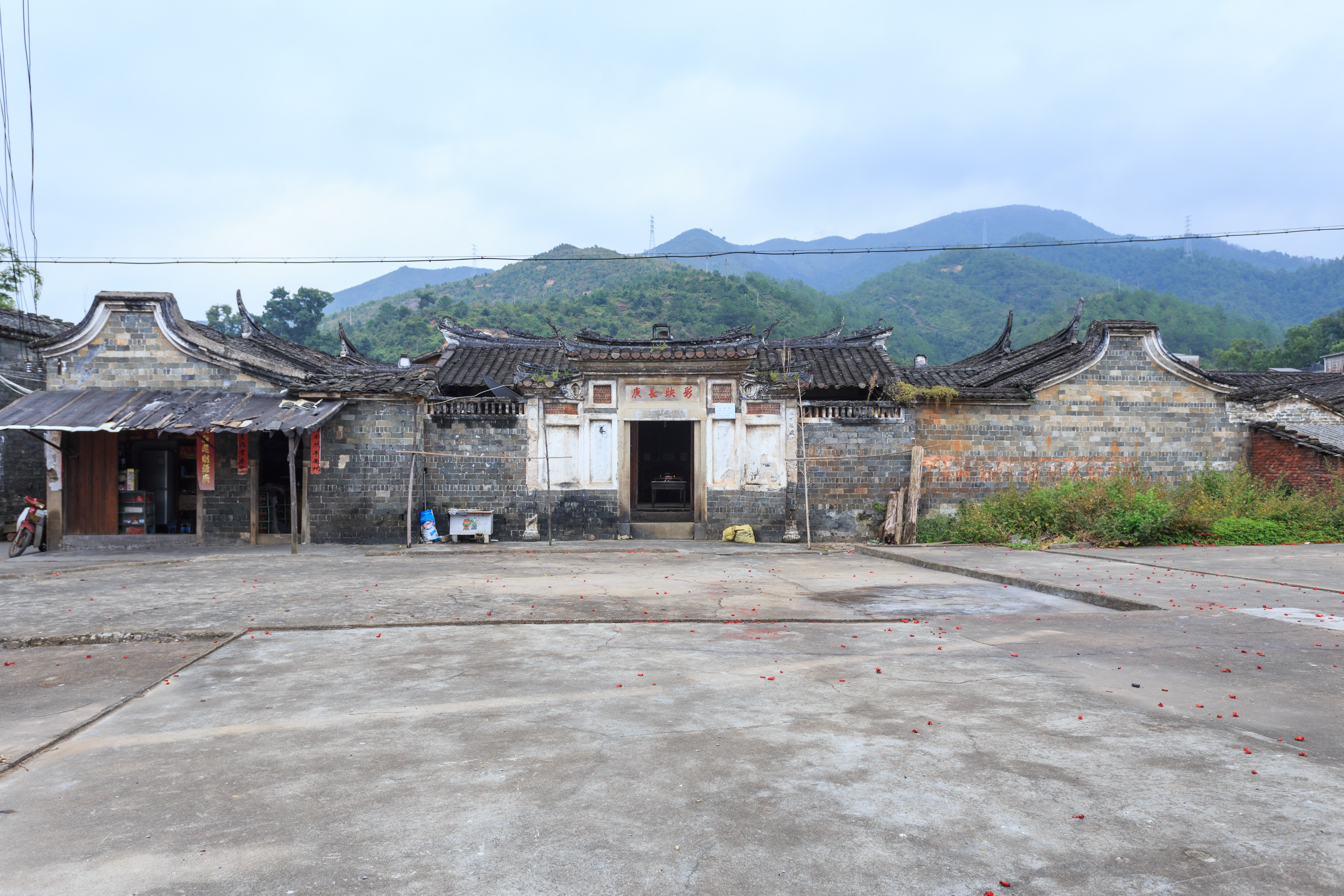
Zhixi Village
