= List of universities and colleges in Fujian =

Overview of universities and colleges in Fujian/Fuchien Province

The following is a list of universities and colleges in Fujian Province, People's Republic of China and Fuchien Province, Republic of China.

== People's Republic of China ==
=== National ===
- Huaqiao University (Quanzhou)
- Xiamen University (founded 1921) Ω

=== Provincial ===
- Jimei University (Xiamen)
- Xiamen University of Technology
- Longyan University
- Minnan Normal University (Zhangzhou)
- Putian University
- Quanzhou Normal University
- Sanming University
- Wuyi University (Fujian) (Wuyishan, Fujian)

=== Fuzhou ===
- Fujian Agriculture and Forestry University (Fuzhou)
- Fujian University of Traditional Chinese Medicine (Fuzhou)
- Minjiang University (Fuzhou)
- Fujian Medical University (Fuzhou)
- Fujian Normal University (founded 1907) (Fuzhou)
- Fujian University of Technology (Fuzhou)
- Fuzhou University

=== Private ===
- Yang-en University (Quanzhou)

== Republic of China ==
=== Kinmen ===
- National Quemoy University
