= Wuyi University =

Wuyi University may refer to:

- Wuyi University (Guangdong) (五邑大学), in Jiangmen, Guangdong
- Wuyi University (Fujian) (武夷学院), in Wuyishan, Fujian
