= Beifeng Subdistrict =

Township-level division of the Fengze district situated in Quanzhou, Fujian, China

Coordinates: 24.93026°N 118.57529°E

Beifeng Subdistrict 北峰街道
- Subdistrict

Chinese transcription(s)
  - Chinese: 北峰街道
  - Pinyin: Běifēng Jiēdào
- Interactive map of Beifeng Subdistrict
- Country: China
- Province: Fujian
- Prefecture: Quanzhou
- District: Fengze
- Time zone: UTC+8 (China Standard Time)

Beifeng Subdistrict is a township-level division of the Fengze district situated in Quanzhou, Fujian, China.

== See also ==
- List of township-level divisions of Fujian
