= Xunpu =

Village in Quanzhou, Fujian, China

Coordinates: 24.859192°N 118.651291°E

Xunpu (Chinese: 蟳埔村; pinyin: Xúnpù Cūn; Pe̍h-ōe-jī: Chîm-po͘-chhoan) is an oyster fishing village in Quanzhou, southern Fujian, China. It is located approximately 10 kilometres (6.2 mi) southeast of downtown Quanzhou.

The village is a regional tourist attraction, owing to its specialty product, oysters, and its traditional Han Chinese subculture. Traditional Xunpu homes, called héké cuò / ô-khak chhò (蚵壳厝), are made of oyster shells.

Xunpu's female villagers don traditional pink floral tunics with buttons to the left and loose black trousers, tie their hair in a chignon and decorate it with colorful flower garlands called zanhuawei / chiām-hoa-ûi (簪花围). During the imperial era, Xunpu women did not practice footbinding, which was common in the rest of China. Some Chinese historians attribute these cultural differences to a theory that Xunpu's villagers are descendants of Arab traders, although most villagers are now devout Mazu followers, not Muslims.

Other major women fishing villages in Fujian include Hui'an and Meizhou Island.

== Demographics ==
In the 1999 Census, Xunpu had a population of 6,002 persons, of which 2,990 were male and 3,012 were female. 70% of villagers bear the surname Huang (黄).
