= Licheng, Quanzhou =

Licheng 鲤城区
- District
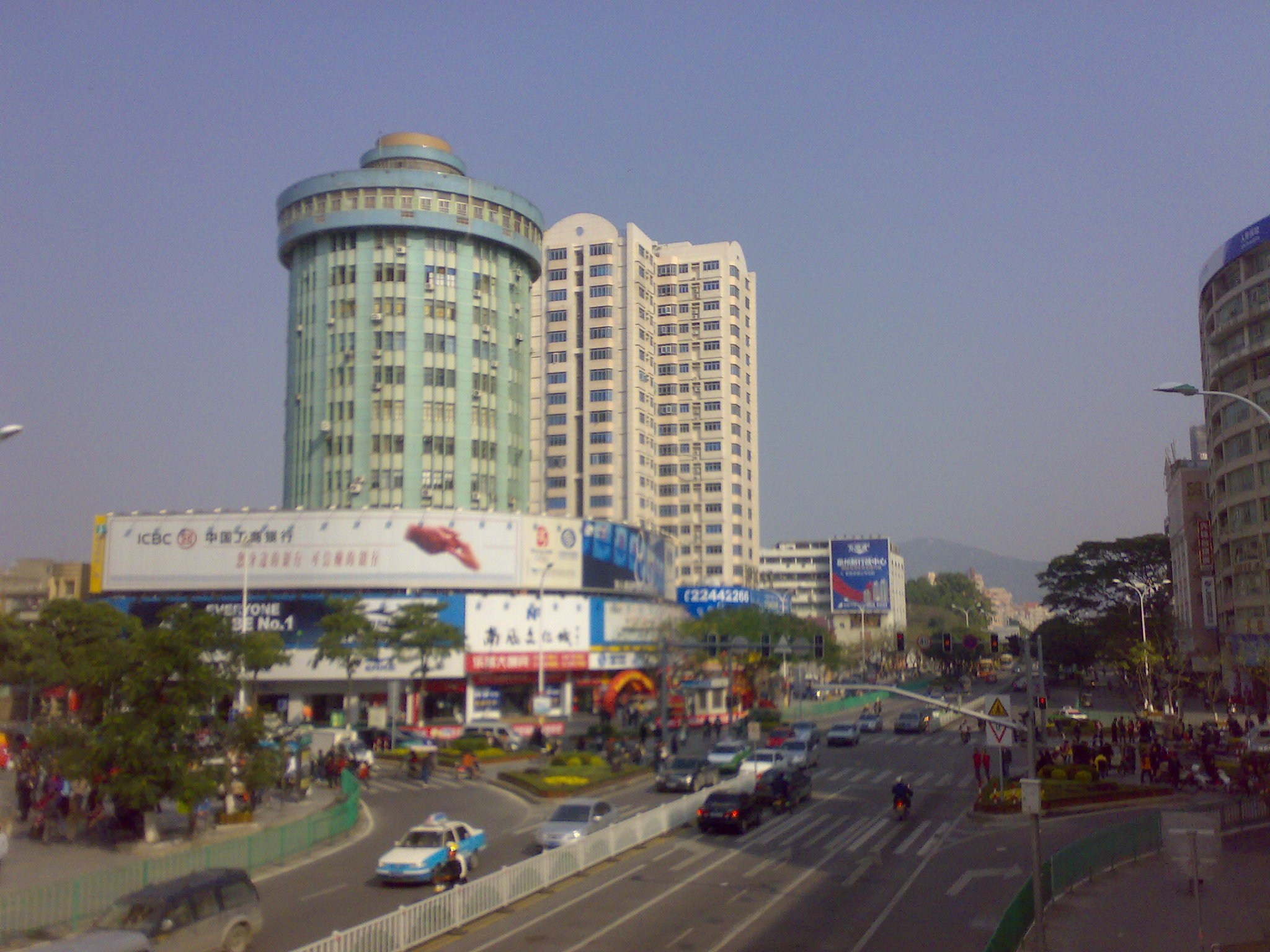

- Location in Fujian
- Coordinates: 24°53′16″N 118°33′57″E
- Country: People's Republic of China
- Province: Fujian
- Prefecture-level city: Quanzhou

Area
  - Total: 56.92 km^{2} (21.98 sq mi)

Population (2020 census)
  - Total: 428,361
  - Density: 7,526/km^{2} (19,490/sq mi)
- Time zone: UTC+8 (China Standard)

UNESCO World Heritage Site
- Location: China
- Part of: Quanzhou: Emporium of the World in Song-Yuan China
- Criteria: Cultural: (iv)
- Reference: 1561
- Inscription: 2021 (44th Session)

Licheng (simplified Chinese: 鲤城区; traditional Chinese: 鯉城區; pinyin: Lǐchéng Qū; Min Nan Pe̍h-ōe-jī: Lí-siâⁿ-khu) is a district of Quanzhou, Fujian province, People's Republic of China with 428,361 inhabitants (2020 Chinese census).

== Geography ==
Licheng District consists of two parts, separated by the Jin River. On the left, northeastern side of the river, Licheng District includes several square kilometers that encompass most of Quanzhou's historical center and relics; this is surrounded on all sides (other than the river) by Fengze District. On the right or southeastern bank, Licheng District includes a much larger area, with both urban and suburban parts.

== Architecture ==
Contrasting to many other cities in China, Licheng has much of its historic center intact. Licheng's historic center is not the typical Chinese city center, having many European-influenced buildings and churches as well. Considering that it is a coastal port city, this is unsurprising. The unique mix of medieval and religious architecture in the old city and its importance to medieval maritime trade in China, especially between Song and Yuan dynasties, led many sites within the district to be inscribed on the UNESCO World Heritage List in 2021.

== Cultural Attractions ==
Most of historical monuments of downtown Quanzhou are within Licheng District.

- Kaiyuan Temple
- Qingjing Mosque
- Tonghuai Temple of Guan Yu and Yue Fei (通淮关岳庙)
- Shrine of The Three Wang, enshrining of Wang Chao, Wang Shenzhi and Wang Shengui (王审圭), founders of Min state during the Five Dynasties and Ten Kingdoms era

== Administration ==
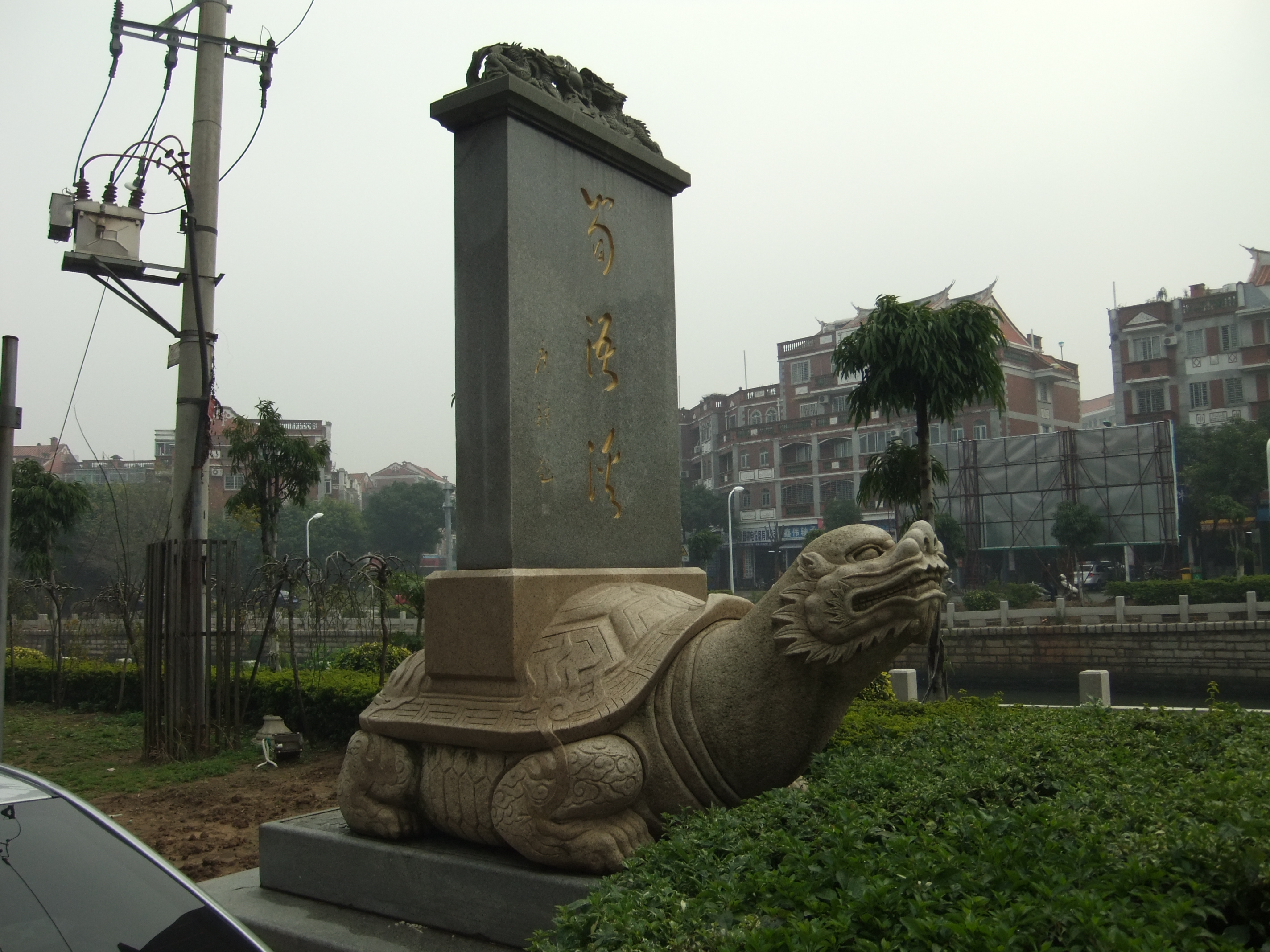
A bixi turtle with a stele, installed by Licheng District Government in 1998 on the bank of the Sunwu Creek, to mark the completion of a dredging project on the said creek (of importance for local flood control).

The district comprises eight subdistricts:

- Jiangnan (江南街道)
- Fuqiao (浮桥街道)
- Jinlong (金龙街道)
- Changtai (常泰街道)
- Kaiyuan (开元街道)
- Lizhong (鲤中街道)
- Haibin (海滨街道)
- Linjiang (临江街道)

There is also one township-level Garden Zone (园区):

- Jiangnan high-tech Zone (江南高新园区)
