= Quanzhou bus station =

Bus station in Quanzhou, Fujian, China

General information
- Location: Quanzhou, Fujian; China
- Coordinates: 24°53′46.45″N 118°35′23.99″E

Other information
- Status: Closed

History
- Opened: 1990
- Closed: 20 December 2020
Location

Quanzhou bus station (Chinese: 泉州汽车站) was a bus station in Quanzhou, Fujian, China.

== History ==
Quanzhou bus station opened in 1990. It was known as "Quanzhou new station" among locals. It closed on 20 December 2021 and the remaining four bus routes were transferred to Quanzhou transportation center. The bus station ticket hall was later used as a COVID-19 vaccination centre.
