= Yang-En University =

Private university in Quanzhou, Fujian, China

Coordinates: 25.111472°N 118.613475°E

- 仰恩大学
- Type: Private university
- Established: 1987
- Location: Quanzhou, Fujian, China
- Campus: Suburban
- Website: yeu.edu.cn

Chinese name
- Simplified Chinese: 仰恩大学
- Traditional Chinese: 仰恩大學
Transcriptions
Standard Mandarin
- Hanyu Pinyin: Yǎngēn Dàxué

Yang-En University (YEU; 仰恩大学) is a private university located in Quanzhou, Fujian, China. The university was founded by Wu Qingxing (吴庆星), an overseas Burmese Chinese, in 1987.

Yang-En University is the first private university accredited by the Government of the People's Republic of China to confer bachelor's degrees. Wu Qingxing's parents were Wu Shanyang (吴善仰) and Du En (杜恩), who came from MajiaWu Qingxing died in 2005 and after that his family members are still involved in the operation of the university.

Yang-En University is situated at the maritime starting point of the Chinese Silk Road, in the Northern outskirts of the historic cultural city of Quanzhou. It boasts a peaceful environment, being quiet and tastefully laid out and is unique for its greenery and fresh air.

The university is situated on Yang-En lake and is surround by mountains of land with a construction space of over 800,000 square meters; its sports fields covers over 200000 square meters including three standard sports grounds with three 400 meters-plastic and polyester tracks and three standard football grounds; besides, there are more than one hundred basketball courts and over twenty courts for volleyball, badminton and tennis as well. All the classrooms in the University have been installed with multimedia facilities for teaching and instruction.

The university also has one advanced net-work center, one computer center, thirteen multimedia language teaching labs, fifteen language testing rooms, eight large multimedia lecture rooms with multifunction systems, nineteen big computer laboratories and large analogue practice bases. To meet the needs of teaching and research, the university has a big library with great numbers of books. There are also other facilities for sports, cultural and recreational activities, board and lodging, and medical services.

Yang-En University has been solely run by the Yang-En Foundation ever since July 1994.
