= Quanzhou =

Prefecture-level city in Fujian, China

Quanzhou 泉州市 Zayton, Chinchew
- Prefecture-level city
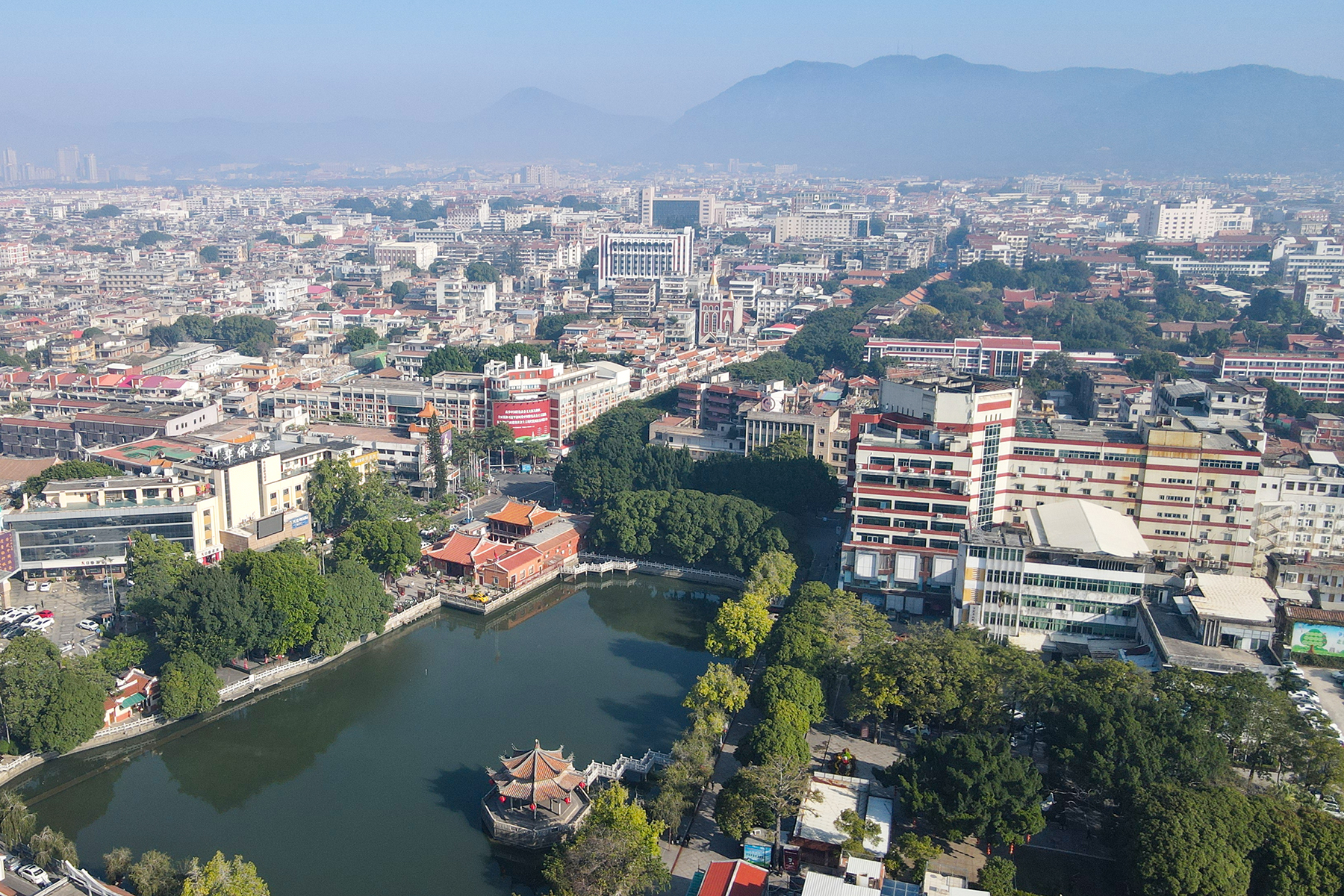
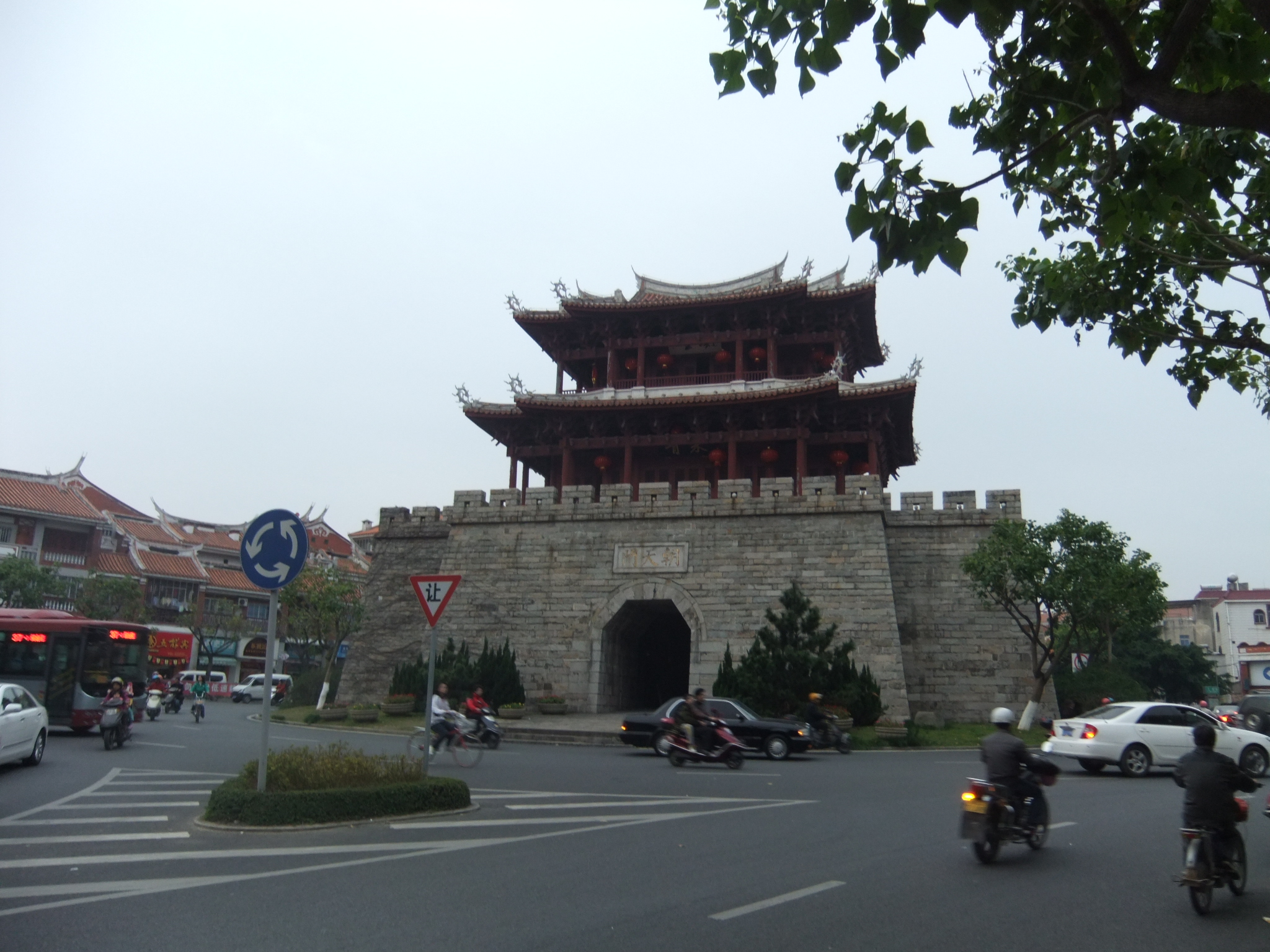
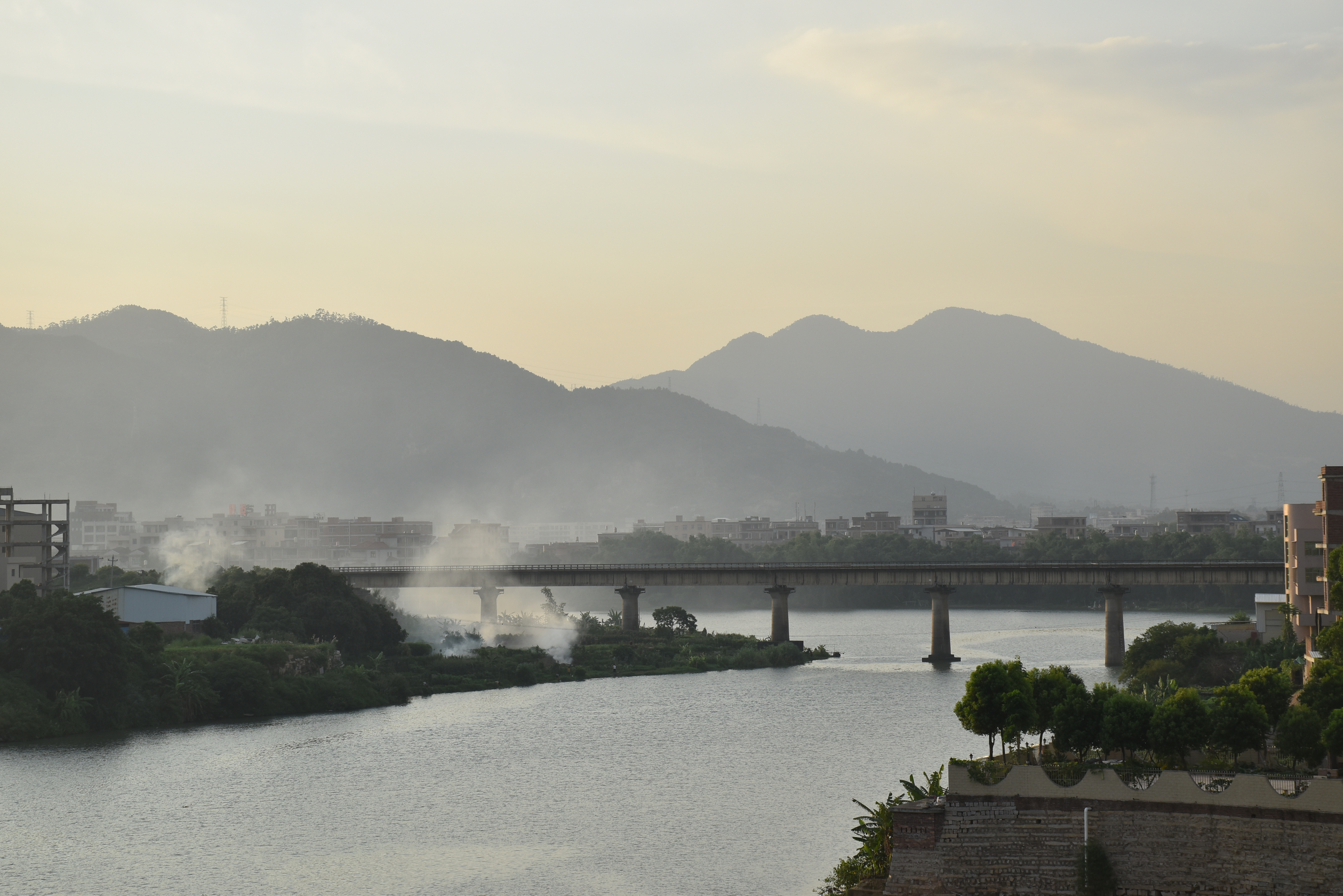
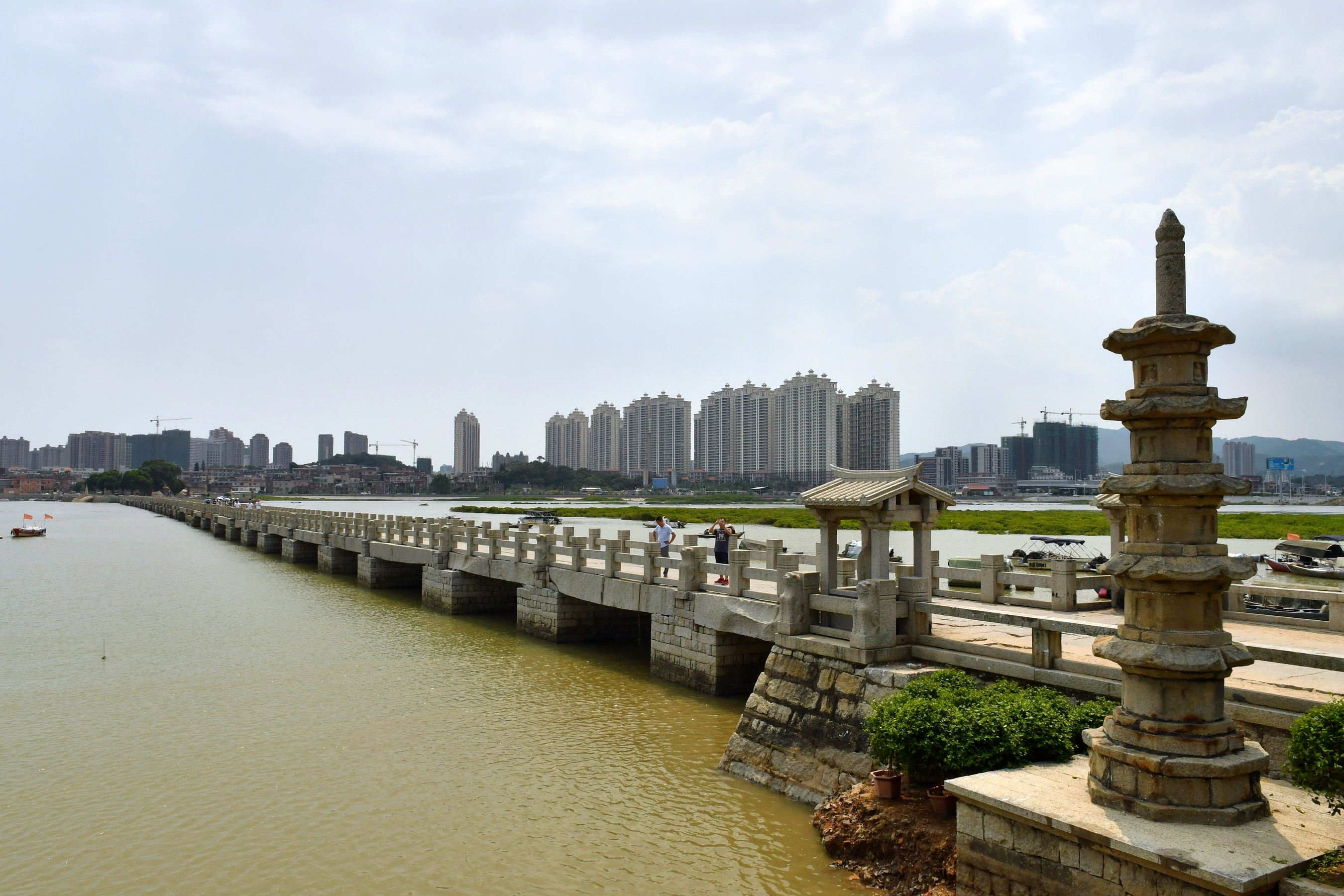
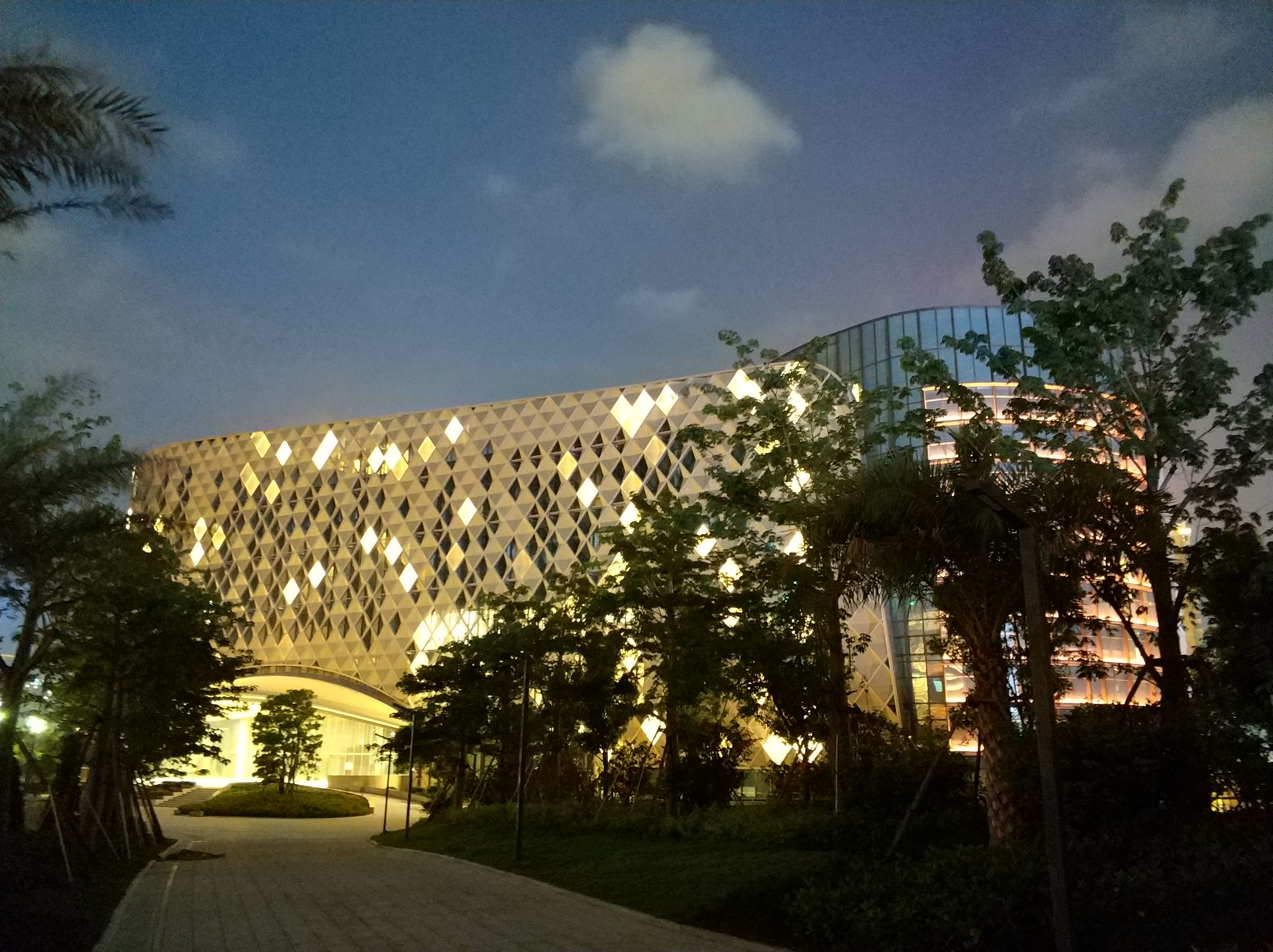
- Old City of Quanzhou Chaotian Gate Zhangping–Quanzhou–Xiaocuo railway over the East Creek Luoyang Bridge Quanzhou Worker's Cultural Palace

- Location within Fujian Location within China
- Coordinates (Quanzhou municipal government): 24°52′28″N 118°40′33″E
- Administered by: People's Republic of China
- Claimed by: Republic of China
- PRC Province: Fujian
- ROC Province: Fuchien
- Municipal seat: Fengze District

Government
  - CPC Secretary: Kang Tao
  - Mayor: Wang Yongli

Area
  - Prefecture-level city: 11,218.91 km^{2} (4,331.65 sq mi)
  - Urban: 872.4 km^{2} (336.8 sq mi)
  - Metro: 4,274.5 km^{2} (1,650.4 sq mi)

Population (2020 census)
  - Prefecture-level city: 8,782,285
  - Density: 782.8109/km^{2} (2,027.471/sq mi)
  - Urban: 1,728,386
  - Urban density: 1,981/km^{2} (5,131/sq mi)
  - Metro: 6,669,711
  - Metro density: 1,560.3/km^{2} (4,041.3/sq mi)

GDP (2025)
  - Prefecture-level city: CN¥ 1,377 trillion US$ 147.3 billion
  - Per capita: CN¥ 115,768; US$ 18,180
- Time zone: UTC+8 (CST)
- Postal code: 362000
- Area code: 0595
- ISO 3166 code: CN-FJ-05
- License Plate Prefixes: 闽C
- Local Dialect: Hokkien/Min Nan: Quanzhou dialect
- Website: www.quanzhou.gov.cn

Chinese name
- Chinese: 泉州
- Hokkien POJ: Choân-chiu
- Postal: Chinchew
- Literal meaning: "Spring Prefecture"
Transcriptions
Standard Mandarin
- Hanyu Pinyin: Quánzhōu
- Wade–Giles: Ch'üan^{2}-chou^{1}
- IPA: [tɕʰɥɛ̌nʈʂóʊ]
Southern Min
- Hokkien POJ: Choân-chiu
- Tâi-lô: Tsuân-tsiu

UNESCO World Heritage Site
- Official name: Quanzhou: Emporium of the World in Song-Yuan China
- Type: Cultural
- Criteria: iv
- Designated: 2021 (44th session)
- Reference no.: 1561
- Region: China

Quanzhou is a prefecture-level port city on the north bank of the Jin River, beside the Taiwan Strait in southern Fujian, People's Republic of China. (Note: The PRC also claims Kinmen County as part of Quanzhou, but it is administered by the Republic of China (ROC) as part of its Fuchien Province.) It is Fujian's most populous metropolitan region, with an area of 11,245 square kilometers (4,342 sq mi) and a population of 8,782,285 as of the 2020 census. Its built-up area is home to 6,669,711 inhabitants, encompassing the Licheng, Fengze, and Luojiang urban districts; Jinjiang, Nan'an, and Shishi cities; Hui'an County; and the Quanzhou District for Taiwanese Investment. Quanzhou was China's 12th-largest extended metropolitan area in 2010.

Quanzhou was China's major port for foreign traders, who knew it as Zaiton, (Note: Zaiton's identification with Quanzhou was controversial in the 19th century, with some scholars preferring to associate Polo and Ibn Battuta's great port with the much more attractive harbor at Xiamen on a variety of pretexts. The Chinese records are, however, clear as to Quanzhou's former status and the earlier excellence of its harbor, which slowly silted up over the centuries. Alternative spellings include Zeiton and Zaytun.) during the 11th through 14th centuries. It was visited by both Marco Polo and Ibn Battuta; both travelers praised it as one of the most prosperous and glorious cities in the world. It was the naval base from which the Mongol attacks on Japan and Java were primarily launched and a cosmopolitan center with Buddhist and Hindu temples, Islamic mosques, and Christian churches, including a Catholic cathedral and Franciscan friaries. A failed revolt prompted a massacre of the city's foreign communities in 1357. Economic dislocations—including piracy and an imperial overreaction to it during the Ming and Qing—reduced its prosperity, with Japanese trade shifting to Ningbo and Zhapu and other foreign trade restricted to Guangzhou. Quanzhou became an opium-smuggling center in the 19th century but the siltation of its harbor hindered trade by larger ships.

Because of its importance for medieval maritime commerce, unique mix of religious buildings, and extensive archeological remains, "Quanzhou: Emporium of the World in Song-Yuan China" was inscribed on the UNESCO World Heritage List in 2021.

== Names ==
Quanzhou (also known as Zayton or Zaiton in British and American historical sources, derived from the Arabic name) is the atonal pinyin romanization of the city's Chinese name 泉州, using its pronunciation in the Mandarin dialect. The name derives from the city's former status as the seat of the imperial Chinese Quan ("Spring") Prefecture. Ch'üan-chou was the Wade-Giles romanization of the same name; other forms include Chwanchow-foo, Chwan-chau fu, Chwanchew, Ts'üan-chou, Tswanchow-foo, Tswanchau, T'swan-chau fu, Ts'wan-chiu, Ts'wan-chow-fu, Thsiouan-tchéou-fou, and Thsíouan-chéou-fou. The romanizations Chuan-chiu, Choan-Chiu, and Shanju (Note: Abulfeda, Geography, recorded by Cordier.) reflect the local Hokkien pronunciation.

The Postal Map name of the city was "Chinchew", an English variant of Chincheo, which is also the historical Spanish, Portuguese (and later also Dutch and French) name for the city. The exact etymon of the term is uncertain with multiple explanations on the matter. Historically, "Chincheo" or also "Chengchio" or "Chenchiu" was likely a name that originally referred to neighboring Zhangzhou, due to the name generally being used by European sailors to denote the Bay of Amoy and its hinterland, or even the whole Fujian province. The confusion is also discussed by Charles R. Boxer (1953) and the 1902 Encyclopedia in that it is apparently the transcription of the local Quanzhou Hokkien pronunciation of the name of Zhangzhou, (Note: Zhangzhou itself is named for its former status as the seat of the imperial Chinese Zhang River Prefecture.) Quanzhou Hokkien Chinese: 漳州; Pe̍h-ōe-jī: Cheng-chiu; lit. 'Zhangzhou' (IPA: /t͡ɕiɪŋ³³ t͡ɕiu³³/), (Note: as opposed to Zhangzhou Hokkien Chinese: 漳州; Pe̍h-ōe-jī: Chiang-chiu; lit. 'Zhangzhou') the major Fujianese port in the 16th and 17th centuries, specifically the old port of Yuegang in Haicheng, Zhangzhou, trading with Spanish Manila and Portuguese Macao. It is uncertain when exactly and why Spanish, Portuguese, Dutch, and later also British and French sailors first applied the name to Quanzhou, but perhaps there were initially some confusion due to miscommunication on first language contact by European sailors with Hokkien speakers around the Bay of Amoy, which the term later stuck and continued due to the language barrier among Hokkien speakers and those who do not speak the language. Another by Duncan (1902) claims that it comes from a supposed previous "Tsuien-chow" Mandarin romanization (Mandarin Chinese: 泉州; pinyin: Quánzhōu; IPA: /t͡ɕʰy̯ɛn³⁵ ʈ͡ʂoʊ̯⁵⁵/). In the Chineesch-Hollandsch Woordenboek van het Emoi dialekt (1882), a Hokkien-Dutch Dictionary from Dutch Batavia (modern-day Jakarta) of the Dutch East Indies, the name of the Quanzhou dialect of Hokkien is transcribed as the "Tsin-tsiu dialekt". It is uncertain which term they transcribed "Tsin-tsiu" from, specifically the first syllable, unless it was simply their attempt at giving a Hokkien term to explain the origins of "Chincheo". On that regard though, as part of Quanzhou prefecture and directly adjacent from the historic city of Quanzhou over the Jin River lies Jinjiang, called in Hokkien Chinese: 晉江; Pe̍h-ōe-jī: Chìn-kang; Tâi-lô: Tsìn-kang, which is now also a county-level city. The now county-level city of Jinjiang (Hokkien: 晉江; Chìn-kang) has the exact same name in Hokkien as the Jin River (Hokkien: 晉江; Chìn-kang; IPA: /t͡sin⁵⁵⁴ kaŋ³³/), directly in between the historic city of Quanzhou to its west and to the north of Jinjiang, which both the river and the county-level city got their name from the Jin dynasty (晉朝) from when the earliest Min-speaking Chinese settlers coming from the Min River area settled the banks of the Jin River around 284 AD. Zhou (州) or at least Hokkien Chinese: 州 / 洲; Pe̍h-ōe-jī: chiu originally referred to alluvial islands in the middle of rivers or at the mouth of rivers, which can somewhat geographically describe the historic city of Quanzhou's geographic position in between the Jin River and the Luoyang River. Similarly, Zhangzhou (漳州; Chiang-chiu) is also named with Hokkien Chinese: 州; Pe̍h-ōe-jī: chiu with Hokkien Chinese: 漳; Pe̍h-ōe-jī: Chiang referring to Hokkien Chinese: 漳江; Pe̍h-ōe-jī: Chiang-kang, which is the old name of the Jiulong River (Hokkien: 九龍江; Kiú-liông-kang) that surrounds the historic city of Zhangzhou.

Its Arabic name Zaiton or "Zayton" (Arabic: زيتون, lit. 'olive (fruit or tree)'), once popular in English, means "[City] of Olives" and is traditionally associated with Quanzhou's former Chinese epithet, Chinese: 刺桐城; pinyin: Cìtóng Chéng; Pe̍h-ōe-jī: Chhì-tông Siâⁿ; lit. 'coral-tree city', referring to the Indian coral trees (Erythrina variegata) said to have been planted around the city by its 10th-century ruler Liu Congxiao. Variant transcriptions from the Arabic name include Caiton, Çaiton, Çayton, Zaytún, Zaitûn, Zaitún, and Zaitūn. The etymology of satin derives from "Zaitun". (Note: As in the Encyclopædia Britannica and in Tellier.)

== Geography ==
Quanzhou proper lies on a split of land between the estuaries of the Jin River and Luoyang River as they flow into Quanzhou Bay on the Taiwan Strait. Its surrounding prefecture extends west halfway across the province and is hilly and mountainous. Along with Xiamen and Zhangzhou to its south and Putian to its north, it makes up Fujian Province's Southern Coast region. In its mountainous interior, it borders Longyan to the southwest and Sanming to the northwest.

=== Climate ===
The city features a humid subtropical climate. Quanzhou has four distinct seasons. Its moderate temperature ranges from 0 to 38 degrees Celsius. In summer, there are typhoons that bring rain and some damage to the city.

Climate data for Quanzhou (Jinjiang), elevation 135 m (443 ft), (1991–2020 normals, extremes 1963–present)
Month	Jan	Feb	Mar	Apr	May	Jun	Jul	Aug	Sep	Oct	Nov	Dec	Year
Record high °C (°F)	28.0 (82.4)	28.9 (84.0)	33.4 (92.1)	35.2 (95.4)	36.3 (97.3)	37.1 (98.8)	38.9 (102.0)	38.9 (102.0)	39.2 (102.6)	36.2 (97.2)	31.8 (89.2)	30.4 (86.7)	39.2 (102.6)
Mean daily maximum °C (°F)	16.8 (62.2)	17.3 (63.1)	19.6 (67.3)	23.8 (74.8)	27.3 (81.1)	30.0 (86.0)	32.7 (90.9)	32.5 (90.5)	31.0 (87.8)	27.4 (81.3)	23.6 (74.5)	19.0 (66.2)	25.1 (77.1)
Daily mean °C (°F)	12.9 (55.2)	13.2 (55.8)	15.5 (59.9)	19.8 (67.6)	23.6 (74.5)	26.7 (80.1)	28.8 (83.8)	28.6 (83.5)	27.1 (80.8)	23.6 (74.5)	19.8 (67.6)	15.2 (59.4)	21.2 (70.2)
Mean daily minimum °C (°F)	10.4 (50.7)	10.7 (51.3)	12.8 (55.0)	17.0 (62.6)	21.0 (69.8)	24.4 (75.9)	26.1 (79.0)	25.9 (78.6)	24.5 (76.1)	20.8 (69.4)	17.2 (63.0)	12.6 (54.7)	18.6 (65.5)
Record low °C (°F)	−0.6 (30.9)	0.9 (33.6)	2.3 (36.1)	6.2 (43.2)	11.2 (52.2)	15.6 (60.1)	20.4 (68.7)	21.6 (70.9)	16.1 (61.0)	12.3 (54.1)	5.0 (41.0)	0.4 (32.7)	−0.6 (30.9)
Average precipitation mm (inches)	44.2 (1.74)	72.7 (2.86)	96.7 (3.81)	106.4 (4.19)	180.9 (7.12)	206.2 (8.12)	126.8 (4.99)	193.1 (7.60)	120.0 (4.72)	48.4 (1.91)	42.2 (1.66)	43.5 (1.71)	1,281.1 (50.43)
Average precipitation days (≥ 0.1 mm)	6.9	9.7	13.4	12.9	14.5	13.8	8.8	11.1	8.1	3.6	4.9	6.3	114
Average relative humidity (%)	70	74	75	76	79	83	78	78	73	66	68	67	74
Mean monthly sunshine hours	138.0	113.0	124.4	142.7	156.3	180.7	265.1	229.5	202.5	199.4	157.5	146.7	2,055.8
Percentage possible sunshine	41	35	33	37	38	44	64	58	55	56	48	45	46
Source: China Meteorological Administration All-time May high

Climate data for Quanzhou (Licheng), elevation 16 m (52 ft), (1991–2020 normals, extremes 1991–present)
Month	Jan	Feb	Mar	Apr	May	Jun	Jul	Aug	Sep	Oct	Nov	Dec	Year
Record high °C (°F)	28.0 (82.4)	28.9 (84.0)	30.8 (87.4)	33.7 (92.7)	34.2 (93.6)	35.9 (96.6)	37.7 (99.9)	38.7 (101.7)	39.2 (102.6)	36.2 (97.2)	32.4 (90.3)	30.4 (86.7)	39.2 (102.6)
Mean daily maximum °C (°F)	16.7 (62.1)	17.1 (62.8)	19.4 (66.9)	23.5 (74.3)	26.9 (80.4)	29.7 (85.5)	32.7 (90.9)	32.5 (90.5)	30.7 (87.3)	27.0 (80.6)	23.2 (73.8)	18.7 (65.7)	24.8 (76.7)
Daily mean °C (°F)	13.0 (55.4)	13.2 (55.8)	15.3 (59.5)	19.7 (67.5)	23.1 (73.6)	26.2 (79.2)	28.6 (83.5)	28.4 (83.1)	26.6 (79.9)	23.2 (73.8)	19.3 (66.7)	15.0 (59.0)	21.0 (69.7)
Mean daily minimum °C (°F)	10.6 (51.1)	10.8 (51.4)	12.8 (55.0)	17.0 (62.6)	20.8 (69.4)	24.0 (75.2)	25.9 (78.6)	25.7 (78.3)	23.9 (75.0)	20.6 (69.1)	16.9 (62.4)	12.6 (54.7)	18.5 (65.2)
Record low °C (°F)	0.1 (32.2)	1.4 (34.5)	4.4 (39.9)	7.1 (44.8)	12.6 (54.7)	15.6 (60.1)	21.5 (70.7)	21.6 (70.9)	16.1 (61.0)	12.8 (55.0)	7.7 (45.9)	0.4 (32.7)	0.1 (32.2)
Average precipitation mm (inches)	58.6 (2.31)	71.0 (2.80)	121.7 (4.79)	124.2 (4.89)	206.0 (8.11)	236.8 (9.32)	150.7 (5.93)	214.1 (8.43)	161.4 (6.35)	39.2 (1.54)	47.8 (1.88)	50.9 (2.00)	1,482.4 (58.35)
Average precipitation days (≥ 0.1 mm)	8.1	10.7	13.4	12.9	14.5	13.9	8.8	11.4	9.2	4.9	5.6	7.0	120.4
Average relative humidity (%)	74	79	82	77	79	83	78	78	74	73	72	70	77
Mean monthly sunshine hours	128.5	94.2	90.8	109.9	146.1	158.1	249.1	220.5	198.5	178.2	157.5	145.1	1,876.5
Percentage possible sunshine	40	29	24	27	36	39	59	56	52	51	48	44	42
Source: China Meteorological Administration

=== Earthquakes ===
Major earthquakes have been experienced in 1394 and on 29 December 1604.

== History ==
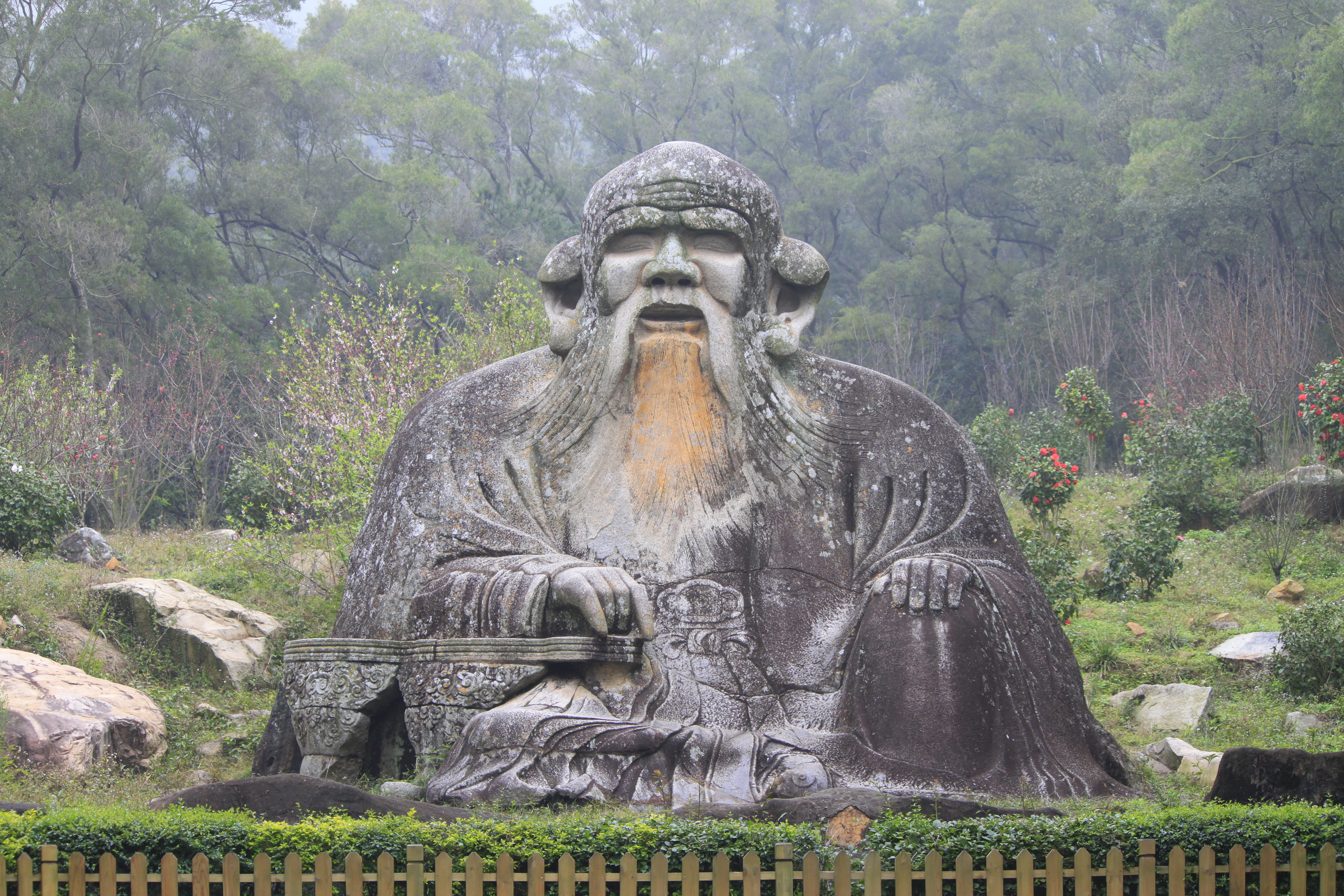
Mount Qingyuan Laozi

=== Early history ===
Wang Guoqing (王國慶) used the area as a base of operations for the Chen State before he was subdued by the Sui general Yang Su in the AD 590s. Quanzhou proper was established under the Tang in 718 on a spit of land between two branches of the Jin River. Muslim traders reached the city early on in its existence, along with their existing trade at Guangzhou and Yangzhou.

=== Five Dynasties and Ten Kingdoms period ===
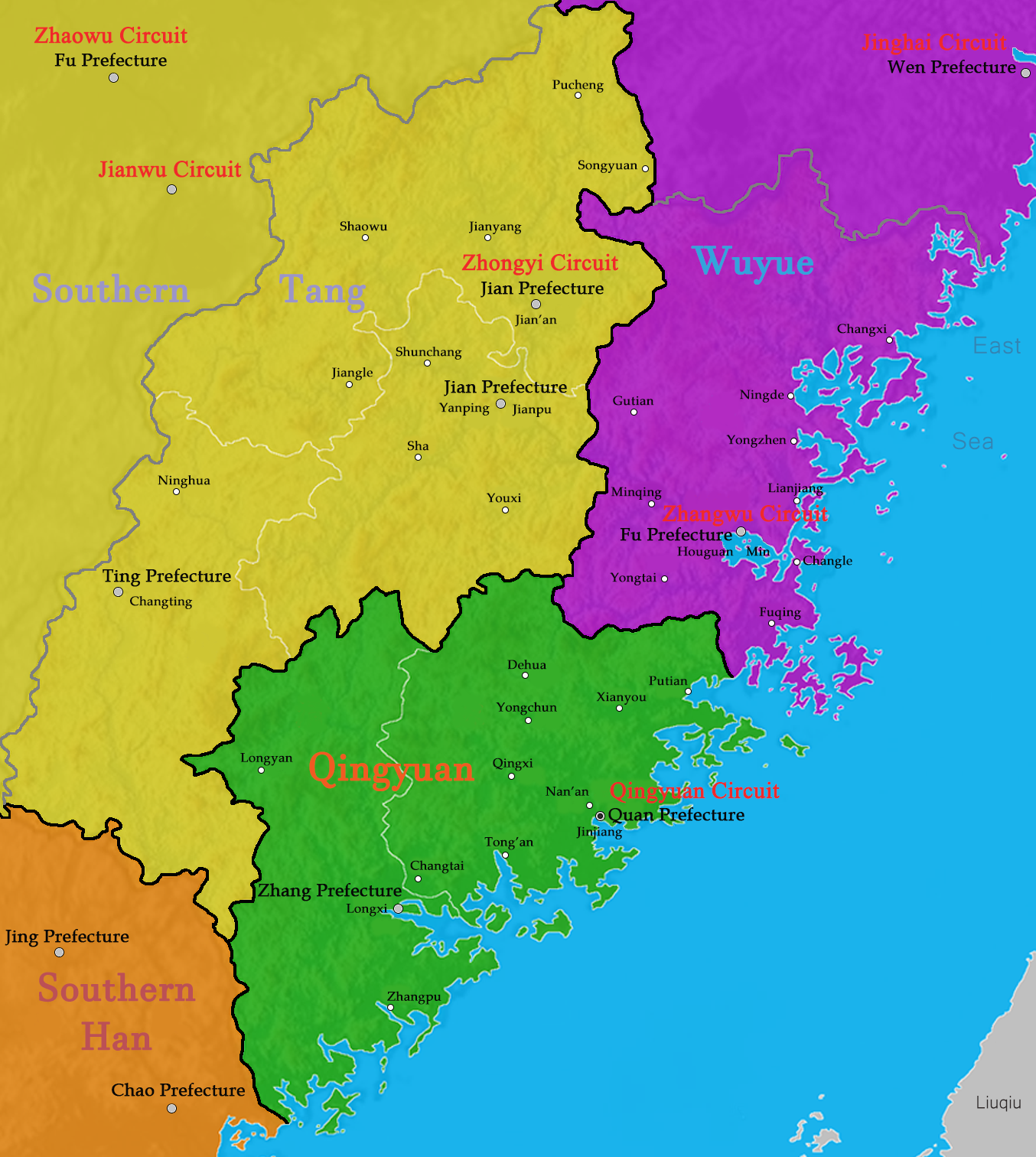
Map of Qingyuan Circuit

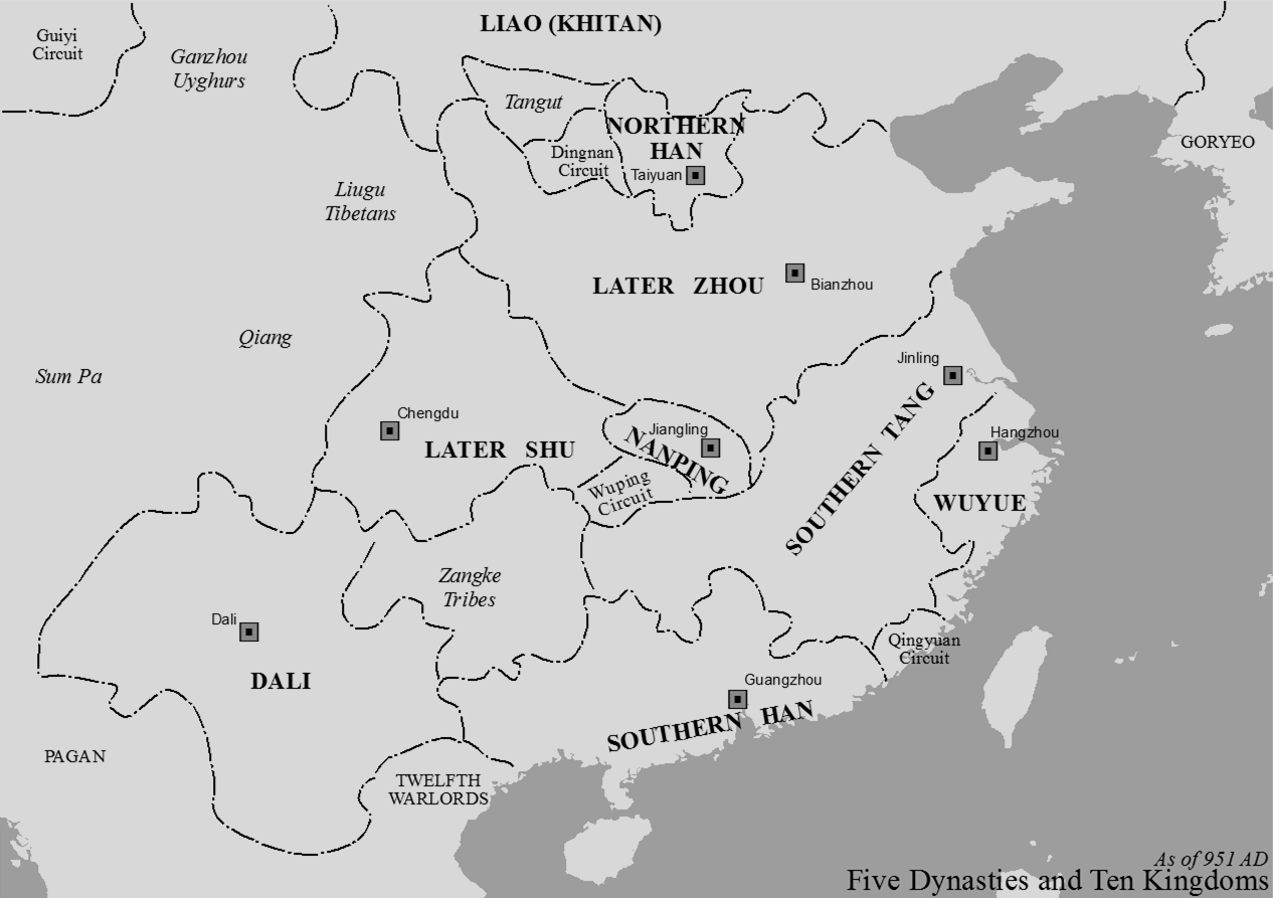
Map showing the location of Qingyuan Circuit

In the early period of the Five Dynasties and Ten Kingdoms period, Quanzhou was a part of Min state. After Min was destroyed by the Southern Tang, the Qingyuan Circuit rose up in the original southern territory of Min. The Qingyuan Circuit was a de facto independent entity that lasted 29 years (949–978) with 4 rulers with its territory including present-day southern Fujian and Putian, with Quanzhou as its capital. Its founder, Liu Congxiao, the Prince of Jinjiang and Jiedushi (military governor) of Qingyuan Circuit, vigorously expanded overseas trade and city development. Erythrina trees were planted throughout Quanzhou city, so Quanzhou was called Erythrina City. In 964, the circuit was renamed the Pinghai Circuit. In 978, Chen Hongjin, the Jiedushi of Pinghai Circuit, was forced to surrender to the Northern Song to avoid war and ravage.

=== Song dynasty ===
Already connected to inland Fujian by roads and canals, Quanzhou grew to international importance in the first century of the Northern Song. It received an office of the maritime trade bureau (shibosi, 市舶司) in 1079 or 1087 and functioned as the starting point of the Maritime Silk Road into the Yuan, eclipsing both the overland trade routes and Guangzhou. A 1095 inscription records two convoys, each of twenty ships, arriving from the Southern Seas each year. Quanzhou's maritime trade developed the area's ceramics, sugar, alcohol, and salt industries. Ninety per cent of Fujian's ceramic production at the time was jade-colored celadon, produced for export. Frankincense was such a coveted import that promotions for the trade superintendents at Guangzhou and Quanzhou were tied to the amount they were able to bring in during their terms in office. During this period it was one of the world's largest and most cosmopolitan seaports. (Note: Among other testaments to this age are tombstones which have been found written in Chinese, Arabic, Syriac, and Latin.) By 1120, its prefecture claimed a population of around 500,000. Its Luoyang Bridge was formerly the most celebrated bridge in China and the 12th century Anping Bridge is also well known.

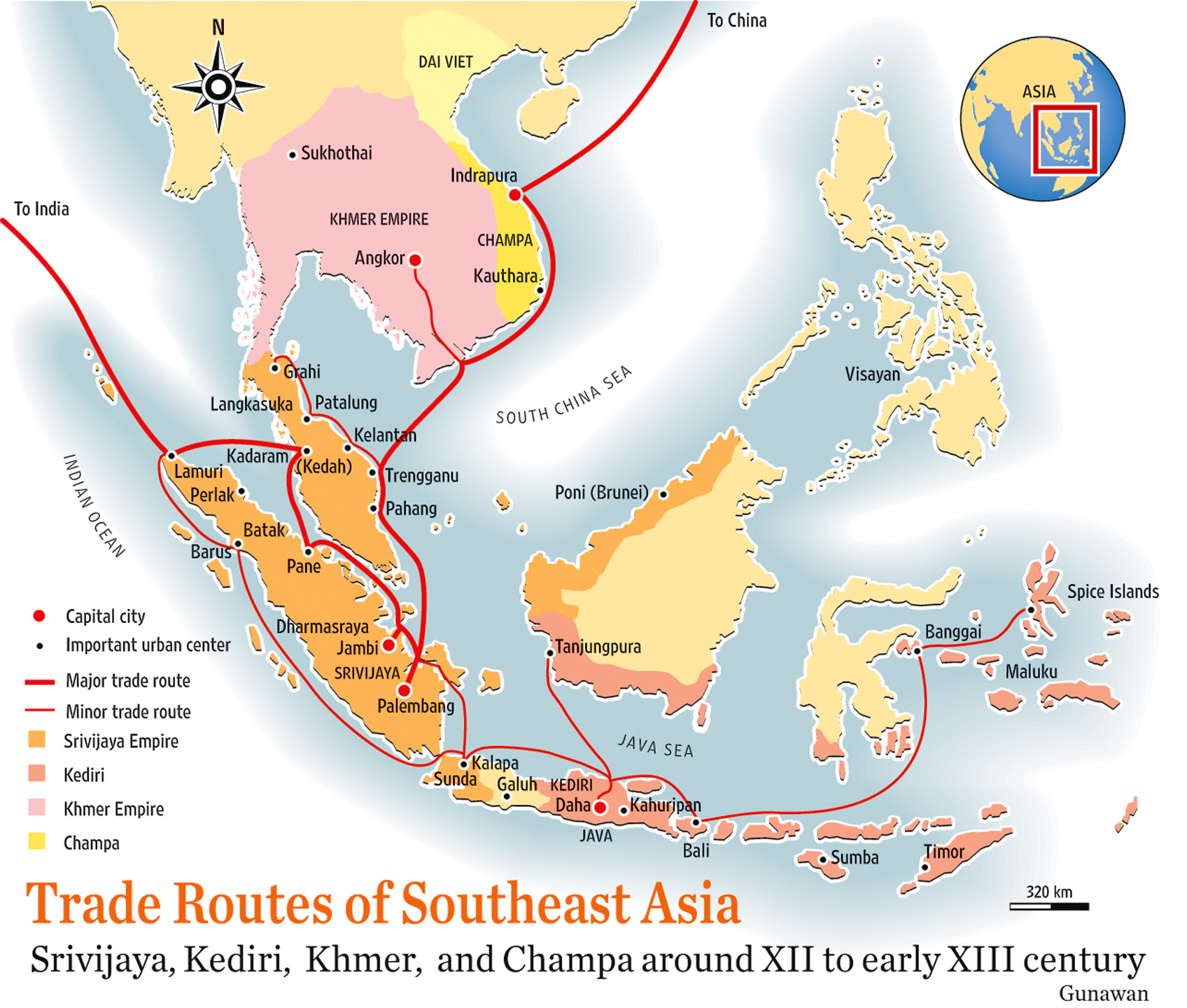
Trade routes in Southeast Asia during Quanzhou's heyday.

Quanzhou initially continued to thrive under the Southern Song. A 1206 report listed merchants from Arabia, Iran, the Indian subcontinent, Sumatra, Cambodia, Brunei, Java, Champa, Burma, Anatolia, Korea, Japan and the kingdoms of the Philippines. One of its customs inspectors, Zhao Rugua, completed his compendious Description of Barbarian Nations c. 1225, recording the people, places, and items involved in China's foreign trade in his age. Other imperial records from the time use it as the zero mile for distances between China and foreign countries. Tamil merchants carved idols of Vishnu and Shiva and constructed Hindu temples in Quanzhou. Nevertheless, by 1225, Quanzhou endured intermittent raids by Visayans who came from the Visayas and raided Quanzhou from their base in Eastern Taiwan.

Over the course of the 13th century, however, Quanzhou's prosperity declined due to instability among its trading partners and increasing restrictions introduced by the Southern Song in an attempt to restrict the outflow of copper and bronze currency from areas forced to use hyperinflating paper money. The increasing importance of Japan to China's foreign trade also benefited Ningbonese merchants at Quanzhou's expense, given their extensive contacts with Japan's major ports on Hakata Bay on Kyushu.

=== Yuan dynasty ===
In 1277 under the Mongolian Yuan dynasty a superintendent of foreign trade was established in the city. The superintendent Pu Shougeng was Muslim and used his contacts to restore the city's trade under its new rulers. He was broadly successful, restoring much of the port's former greatness. His office became hereditary to his descendants.

Into the 1280s Quanzhou sometimes served as the provincial capital for Fujian. (Note: It was considered so important by the Jesuits that they sometimes called all of Fujian Chinheo. In 1515 Giovanni d'Empoli mistakenly recorded that "Zeiton" was the seat of the "Great Can" who ruled China but Quanzhou never served as an imperial capital.) Its population was around 455,000 in 1283, the major items of trade being pepper and other spices, gemstones, pearls, and porcelain.

Marco Polo recorded that the Yuan emperors derived "a vast revenue" from their 10 percent duty on the port's commerce; he called Quanzhou's port "one of the two greatest havens in the world for commerce" and "the Alexandria of the East". Ibn Battuta simply called it the greatest port in the world. (Note: Notwithstanding the derivation of Zayton from Quanzhou's old nickname "City of the Tung Trees", some details of Ibn Battuta's description suggest he was referring to Zhangzhou.) Polo noted its tattoo artists were famed throughout Southeast Asia. It was the point of departure for Marco Polo's 1292 return expedition, escorting the 17-year-old Mongolian princess Kököchin to her fiancé in the Persian Ilkhanate; a few decades later, it was the point of arrival and departure for Ibn Battuta. (Note: Quanzhou was also the probable point of departure for the Franciscan friar John of Marignolli around the same time but this is uncertain given the partial nature of the record of his time in China.) Kublai Khan's invasions of Japan and Java sailed primarily from its port. The Islamic geographer Abulfeda noted, in c. 1321, that its city walls remained ruined from its conquest by the Mongols. In the mid-1320s Friar Odoric noted the town's two Franciscan friaries, but admitted the Buddhist monasteries were much larger, with over 3000 monks in one.

Between 1357 and 1367 the Yisibaxi Muslim Persian garrison started the Ispah rebellion against the Yuan dynasty in Quanzhou and southern Fujian due to increasingly anti-Muslim laws. Persian militia leaders Sayf ad-Din (賽甫丁) and Amir ad-Din (阿迷里丁) led the revolt. Arabic official Yawuna (那兀纳) assassinated Amir ad-Din in 1362 and took control of the Muslim rebel forces. The Muslim rebels tried to strike north and took over some parts of Xinghua but were defeated at Fuzhou. Yuan provincial loyalist forces from Fuzhou defeated the Muslim rebels in 1367. Sayf ad-Din and Amir ad-Din fought for Fuzhou and Xinghua for five years. They both were murdered by another Muslim called Nawuna in 1362 so he then took control of Quanzhou and the Ispah garrison for five more years until his defeat by the Yuan authorities.

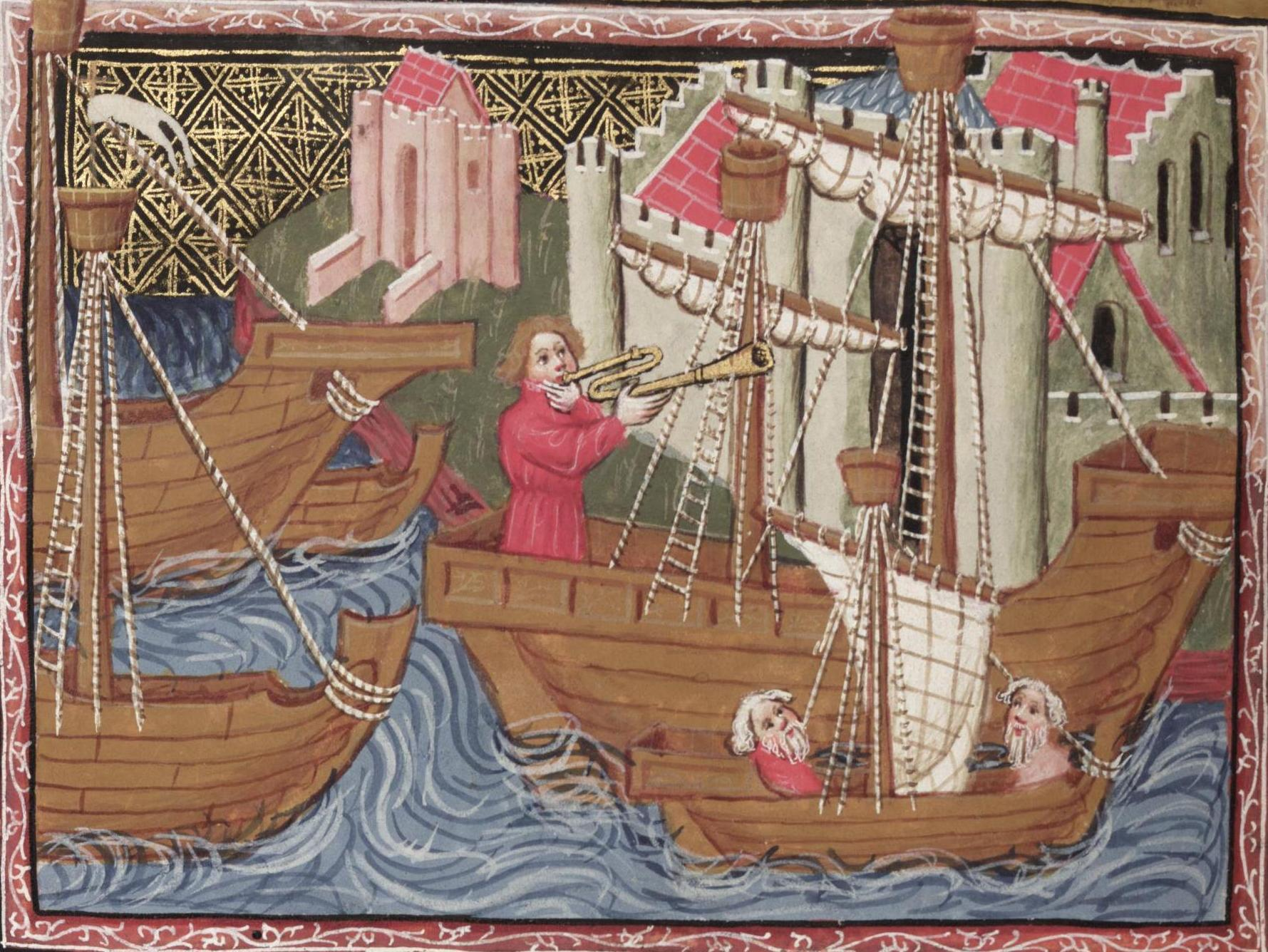
Zayton as imagined by a 15th-century European illustrator of The Travels of Marco Polo

Nawuna was killed in turn by Chen Youding. Chen began a campaign of persecution against the city's Sunni community—including massacres and grave desecration—that eventually became a three-days anti-foreign massacre. Emigrants fleeing the persecution rose to prominent positions throughout Southeast Asia, spurring the development of Islam on Java and elsewhere. The Yuan were expelled in 1368, and they turned against Pu Shougeng's family and the Muslims and slaughtered Pu Shougeng's descendants in the Ispah rebellion. Mosques and other buildings with foreign architecture were almost all destroyed and the Yuan imperial soldiers killed most of the descendants of Pu Shougeng and mutilated their corpses.

=== Ming and early Qing dynasties ===
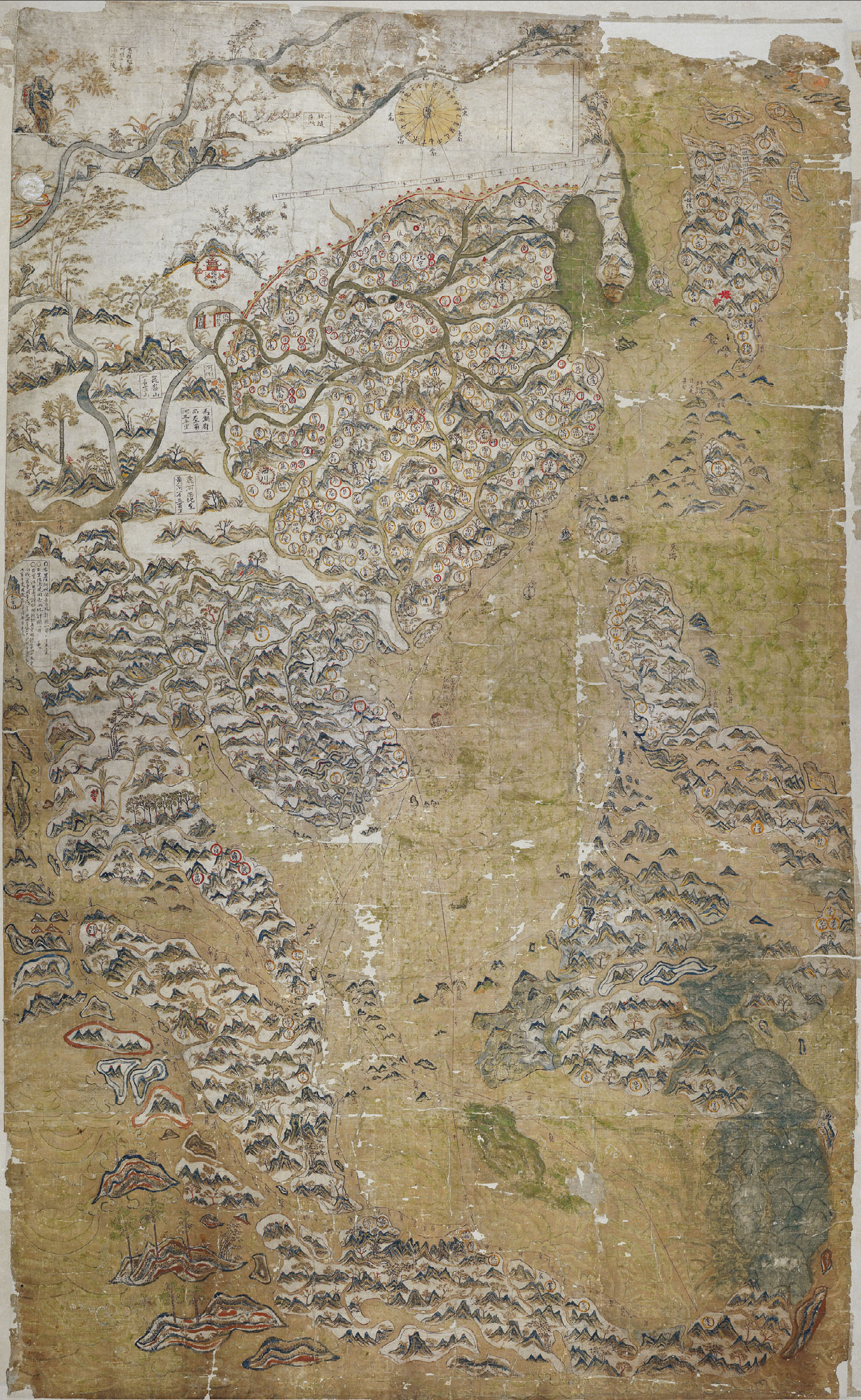
The Selden Map during the early 17th century, with Quanzhou as its trade route epicenter

The Ming discouraged foreign commerce other than formal tributary missions. By 1473 trade had declined to the point that Quanzhou was no longer the headquarters of the imperial customs service for Fujian. The Wokou, who came from many different ethnicities, including Japanese, Korean, and Chinese, forced Quanzhou's Superintendency of Trade to close completely in 1522.

During the Qing dynasty the Sea Ban did not help the city's traders or fishermen. They were forced to abandon their access to the sea for years at a time and coastal farmers forced to relocate miles inland to inner counties like Yongchun and Anxi. Violent large scale clan fights with the thousands of non-native families from Guangdong who were deported to Quanzhou city by the Qing immediately occurred.

=== 19th century to present day ===
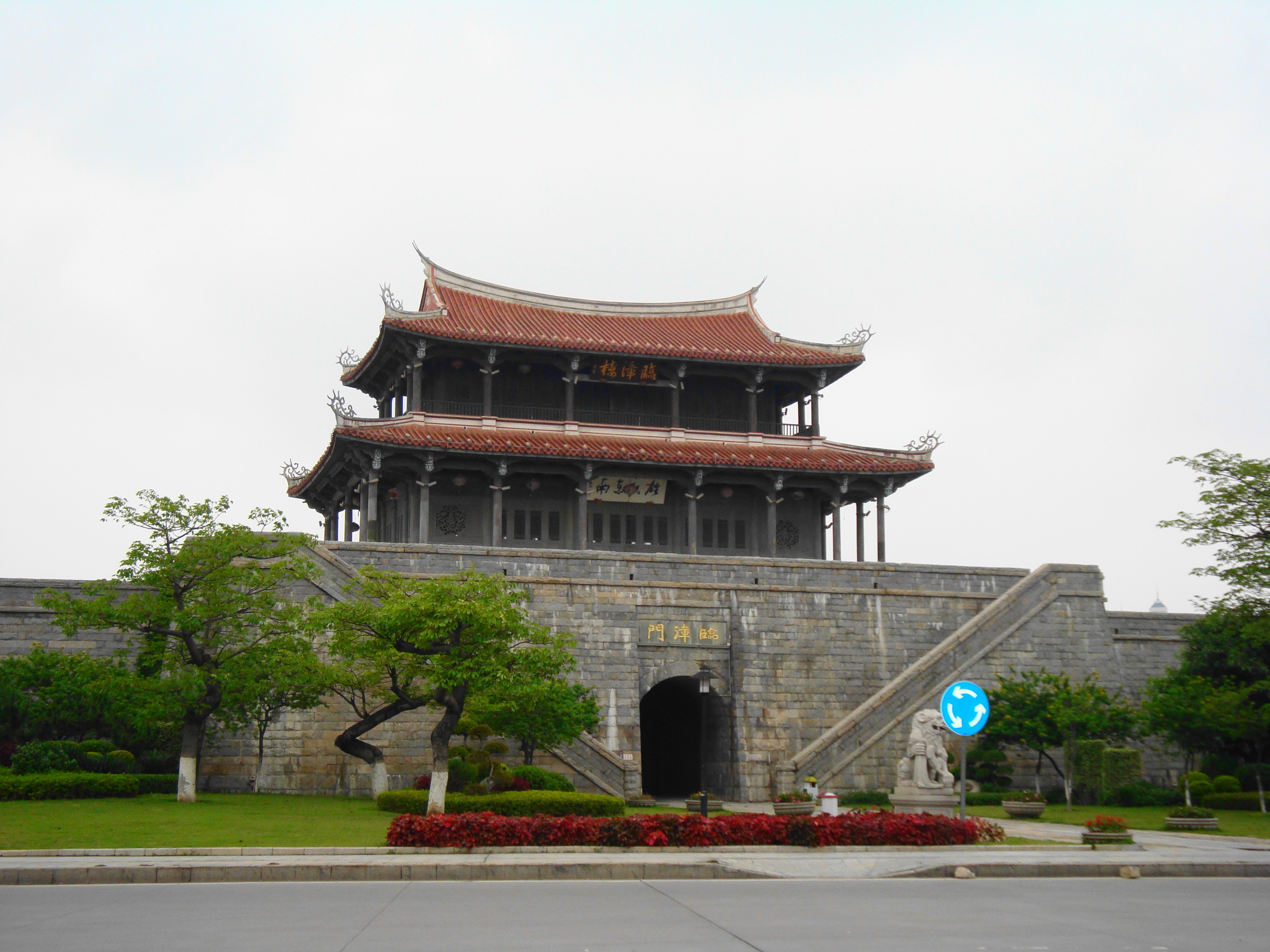
Reconstructed Linzhang Gate

In the 19th century, the city walls still protected a circuit of 7–8 miles (11–13 km) but embraced much vacant ground. The bay began to attract Jardines' and Dents' opium ships from 1832. Following the First Opium War, Governor Henry Pottinger proposed using Quanzhou as an official opium depot to keep the trade out of Hong Kong and the other treaty ports but the rents sought by the imperial commissioner Qiying were too high.

When Chinese pirates overran the receiving ships in Shenhu Bay to capture their stockpiles of silver bullion in 1847, however, the traders moved to Quanzhou Bay regardless. Around 1862, a Protestant mission was set up in Quanzhou. As late as the middle of the century, large Chinese junks could still access the town easily, trading in tea, sugar, tobacco, porcelain, and nankeens, but sand bars created by the rivers around the town had generally incapacitated its harbor by the First World War. It remained a large and prosperous city, but conducted its maritime trade through Anhai.

After the Chinese Civil War, Kinmen became disconnected from Quanzhou with the Nationalists successfully defended Kinmen in battle from a Communist takeover attempt.

== Administrative divisions ==
The prefecture-level city of Quanzhou administers four districts, three county-level cities, four counties, and two special economic districts. The People's Republic of China claims Kinmen Islands (Quemoy) (administered and also claimed by the Republic of China) as Kinmen County under the administration of Quanzhou.

Map
English Name	Simplified	Pinyin	POJ	Area (km^{2})	Population (2010)	Density (per km^{2})
Licheng District	鲤城区	Lǐchéng Qū	Lí-siâⁿ-khu	52.41	404,817	7,724
Fengze District	丰泽区	Fēngzé Qū	Hong-te̍k-khu	132.25	529,640	4,005
Luojiang District	洛江区	Luòjiāng Qū	Lo̍k-kang-khu	381.72	187,189	490
Quangang District	泉港区	Quángǎng Qū	Chôan-káng-khu	306.03	313,539	1025
Shishi City	石狮市	Shíshī Shì	Chio̍h-sai-chhī	189.21	636,700	3,365
Jinjiang City	晋江市	Jìnjiāng Shì	Chìn-kang-chhī	721.64	1,986,447	2,753
Nan'an City	南安市	Nán'ān Shì	Lâm-oaⁿ-chhī	2,035.11	1,418,451	697
Hui'an County	惠安县	Huì'ān Xiàn	Hūiⁿ-oaⁿ-kūiⁿ	762.19	944,231	1,239
Anxi County	安溪县	Ānxī Xiàn	An-khoe-kūiⁿ	2,983.07	977,435	328
Yongchun County	永春县	Yǒngchūn Xiàn	Éng-chhun-kūiⁿ	1,445.8	452,217	313
Dehua County	德化县	Déhuà Xiàn	Tek-hòe-kūiⁿ	2,209.48	277,867	126
Kinmen County *	金门县	Jīnmén Xiàn	Kim-mn̂g-kūiⁿ	153.011	127,723	830

*Since its founding in 1949, the People's Republic of China ("Mainland China") has claimed the Kinmen Islands (Quemoy) as part of Quanzhou but has never controlled them; they are administered by and also claimed by the Republic of China (Taiwan).

== Demographics ==
As of the 2010 census, Quanzhou has a population of 8,128,530. Its built-up area is home to 6,107,475 inhabitants, encompassing the Licheng, Fengze, and Luojiang urban districts; Jinjiang, Nan'an, and Shishi cities; Hui'an County; and the Quanzhou District for Taiwanese Investment.

=== Religion ===
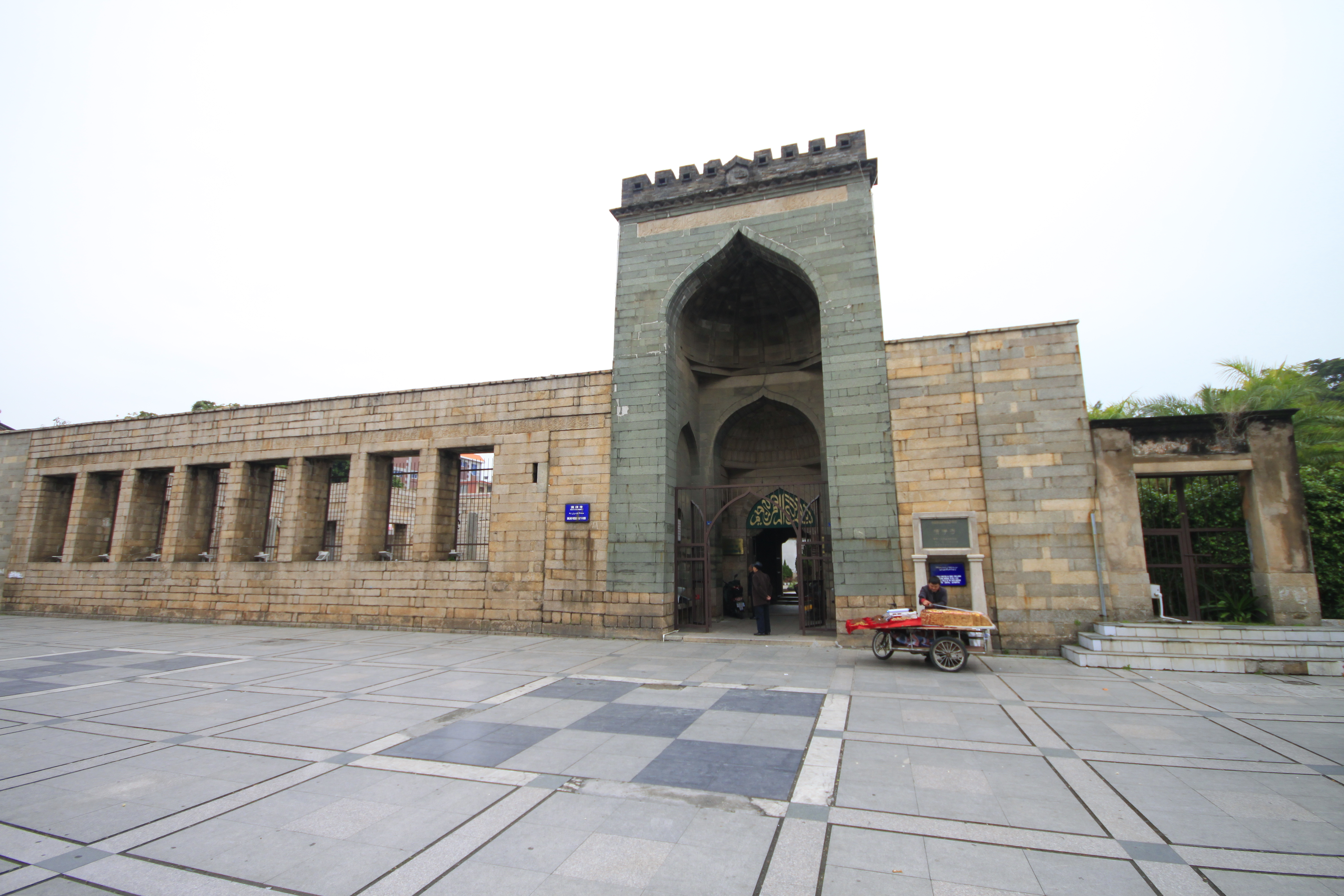
Qingjing Mosque

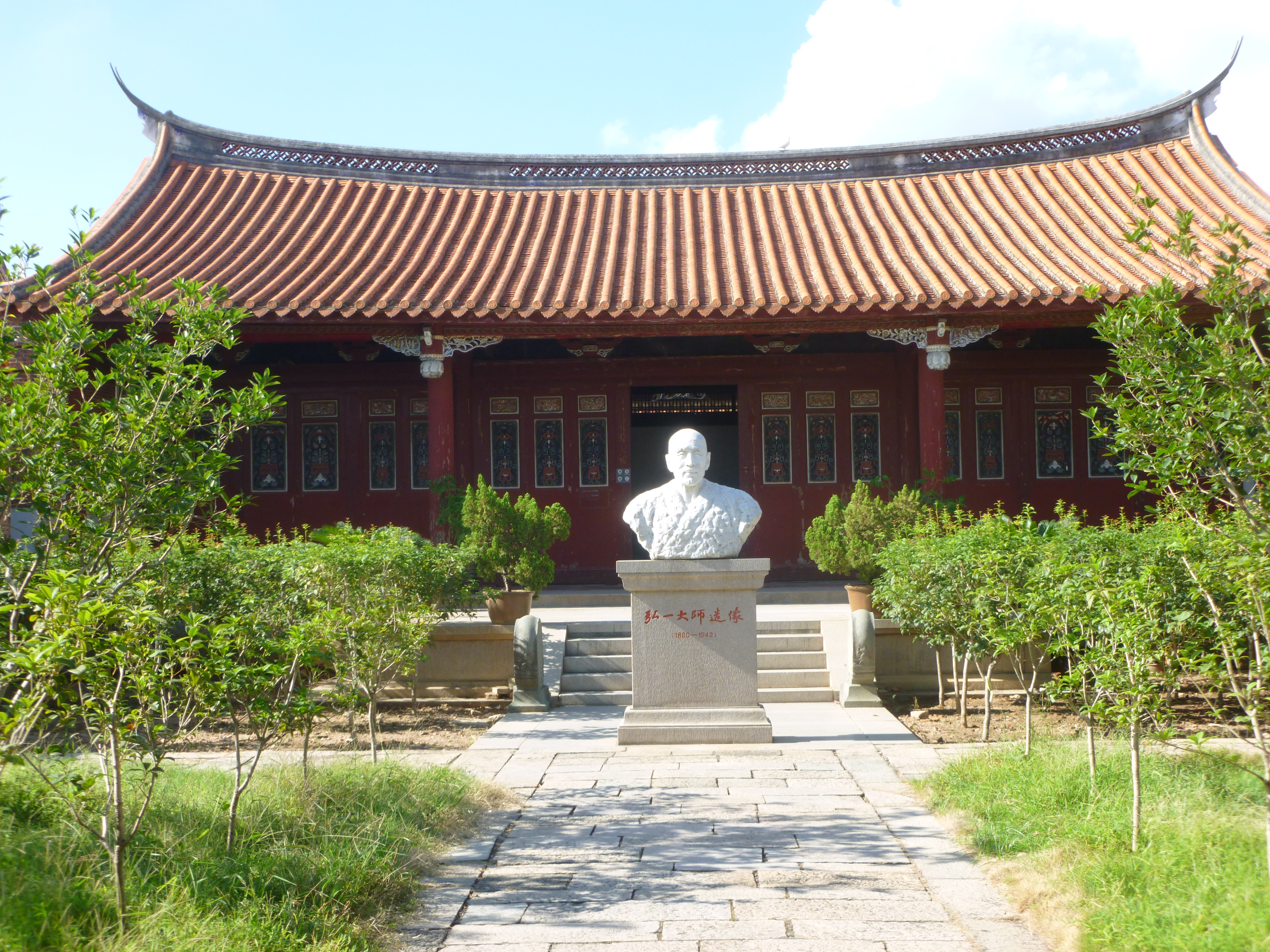
Kaiyuan Temple, 2014

Medieval Quanzhou was long one of the most cosmopolitan Chinese cities, with Chinese folk religious temples, Buddhist temples, Taoist temples and Hindu temples; Islamic mosques; and Christian churches, including Nestorian and a cathedral (financed by a rich Armenian lady) and two Franciscan friaries. Andrew of Perugia served as the Roman Catholic bishop of the city from 1322. Odoric of Pordenone was responsible for relocating the relics of the four Franciscans martyred at Thane in India in 1321 to the mission in Quanzhou. English Presbyterian missionaries raised a chapel around 1862. The Qingjing Mosque dates to 1009 but is now preserved as a museum. The Buddhist Kaiyuan Temple has been repeatedly rebuilt but includes two 5-story 13th-century pagodas. Among the most popular folk or Taoist memorial hall is Guan Yue Memorial Hall (通淮關岳廟) that is dedicated to Lord Yue and famous Lord Guan, who is honored for his righteousness and the spirit of brotherhood. Jinjiang also preserves the Cao'an monastery (草庵寺), originally constructed by Manicheans under the Yuan but now used by New Age spiritualists, and a Confucian Memorial Hall (文庙, Wenmiao).

=== Language ===
Locals speak the Quanzhou dialect of Hokkien (Min Nan) partly the same as the Amoy dialect spoken in Xiamen, and similar to Malaysian Hokkien, Singaporean Hokkien, Philippine Hokkien, and Quanzhou-descended Taiwanese dialects. It is unintelligible with Mandarin. Many overseas Chinese whose ancestors came from the Quanzhou area, especially those in Southeast Asia, often speak mainly Hokkien at home. Around the "Southern Min triangle area," which includes Quanzhou, Xiamen and Zhangzhou, locals all speak the Hokkien language. The dialects of Hokkien itself that they speak are similar but have different tones and sometimes different pronunciation and vocabulary.

=== Emigration ===
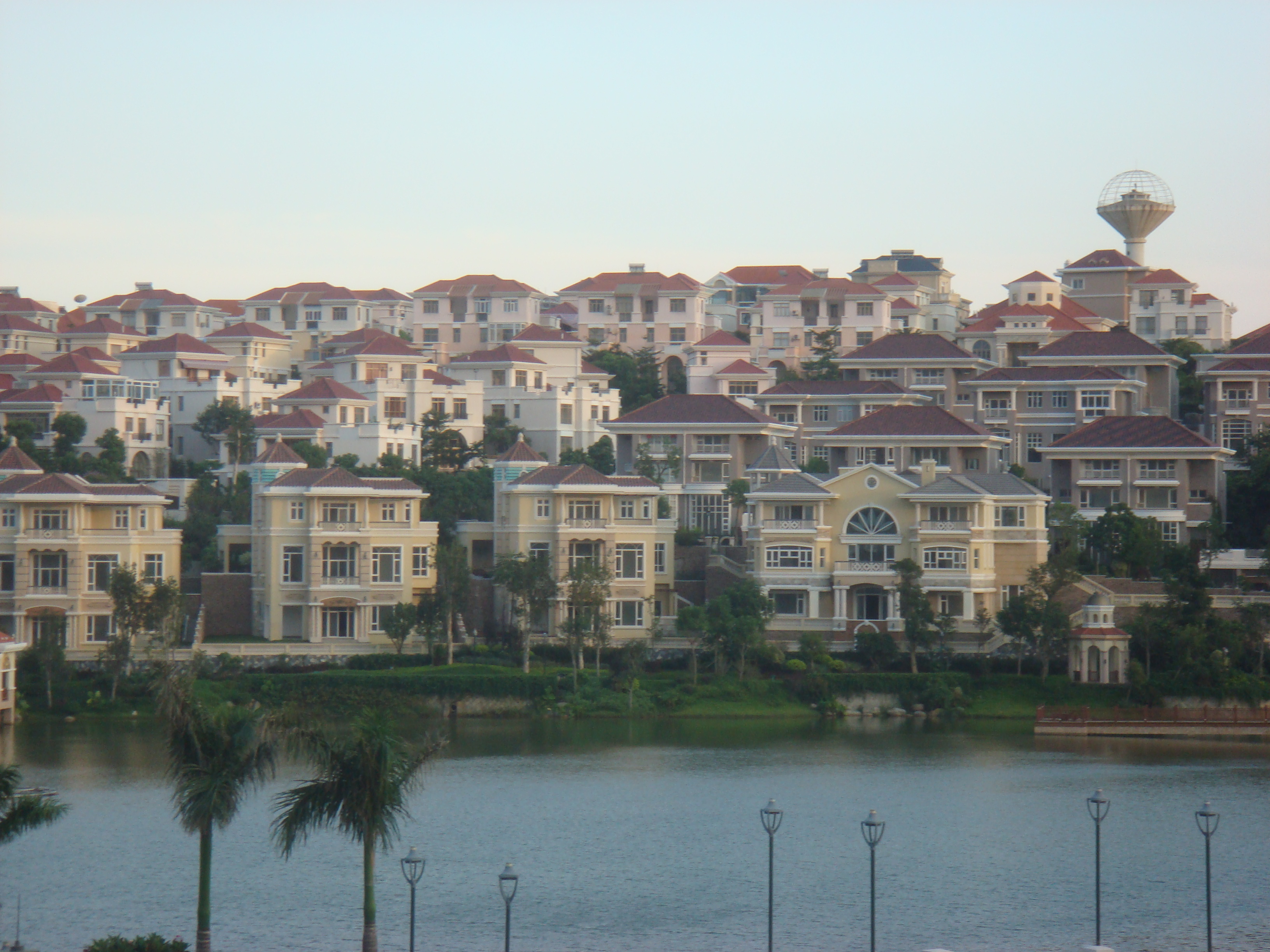
New housing developments near the city center

As one of China's best known qiao'xiangs (侨乡, hometown of overseas Chinese), Quanzhou has been a source for Chinese emigration to Southeast Asia and Taiwan. Some of these communities date to Quanzhou's heyday a millennium ago under the Song and Yuan dynasties. About 6 million overseas Chinese trace their ancestry to Quanzhou and Tong'an county. Most of them live in Southeast Asia, including Singapore, the Philippines, Malaysia, Indonesia, Myanmar, and Thailand.

== Economy ==
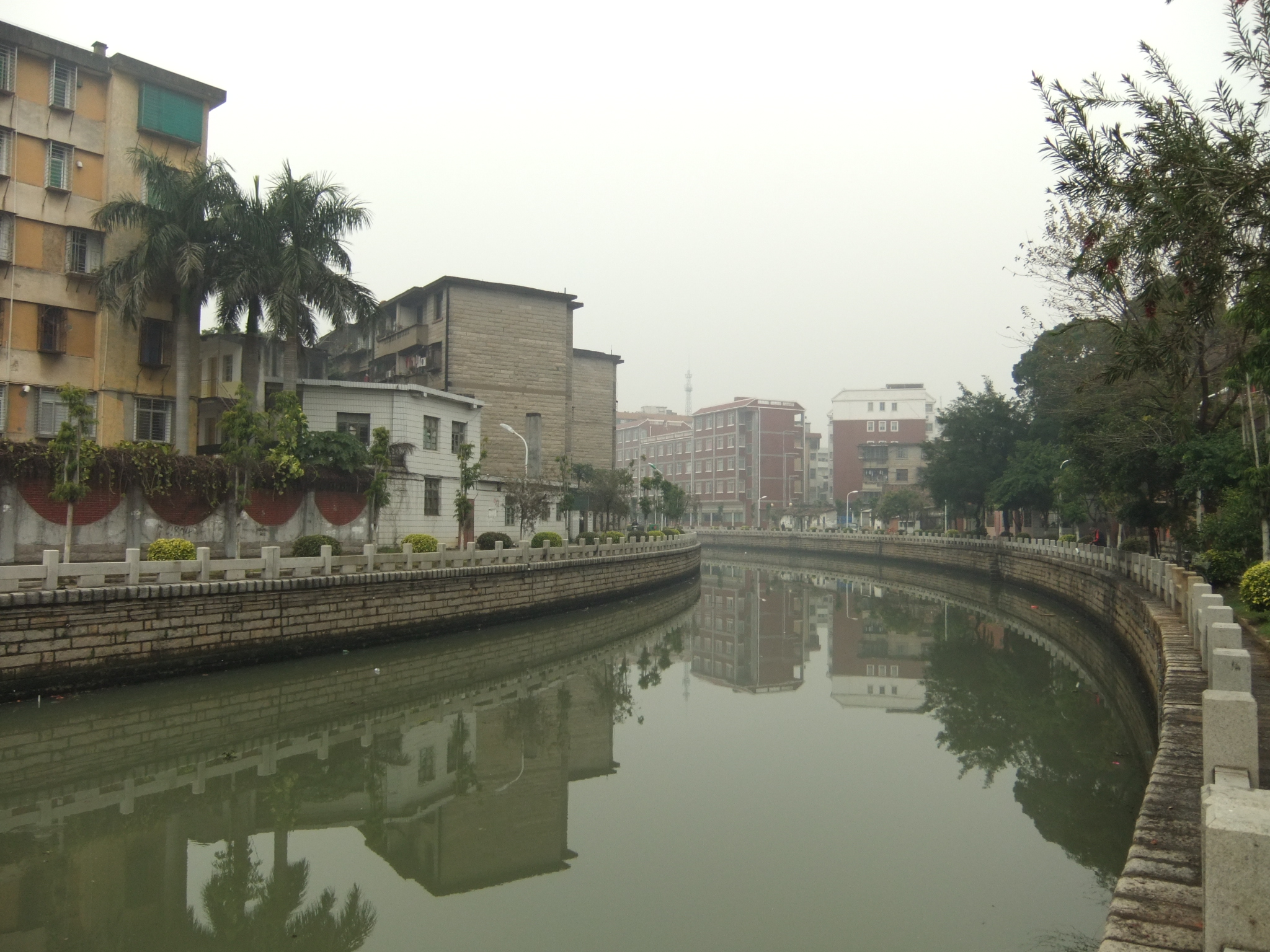
Quanzhou's Sunwu Creek

Historically Quanzhou exported black tea, camphor, sugar, indigo, tobacco, ceramics, cloth made of grass, and minerals. As of 1832 Quanzhou imported, primarily from Guangzhou, wool cloth, wine, and watches. The East India Company was exporting an estimated £150,000 a year in black tea from Quanzhou.

Today Quanzhou is a major exporter of agricultural products such as tea, banana, lychee, and rice. It is also a major producer of quarry granite and ceramics. Other industries include textiles, footwear, fashion and apparel, packaging, machinery, paper and petrochemicals.

Its GDP ranked first in Fujian Province for 20 years from 1991 to 2010. In 2008 Quanzhou's textile and apparel production accounted for 10 percent of China's overall apparel production, stone exports account for 50 percent of Chinese stone exports, resin handicraft exports account for 70 percent of the country's total, ceramic exports account for 67 percent of the country's total, candy production accounts for 20 percent, and the production of sport and tourism shoes accounts for 80% of Chinese, and 20 percent of world production.

Quanzhou is known today as China's shoe city. Quanzhou's 3,000 shoe factories produce 500 million pairs a year, making nearly one in every four pairs of sneakers made in China.

== Cars ==
Quanzhou is the biggest automotive market in Fujian. It has the highest rate of private automobile possession. Quanzhou is connected by major roads from Fuzhou to the north and Xiamen to the south.

== Transport ==
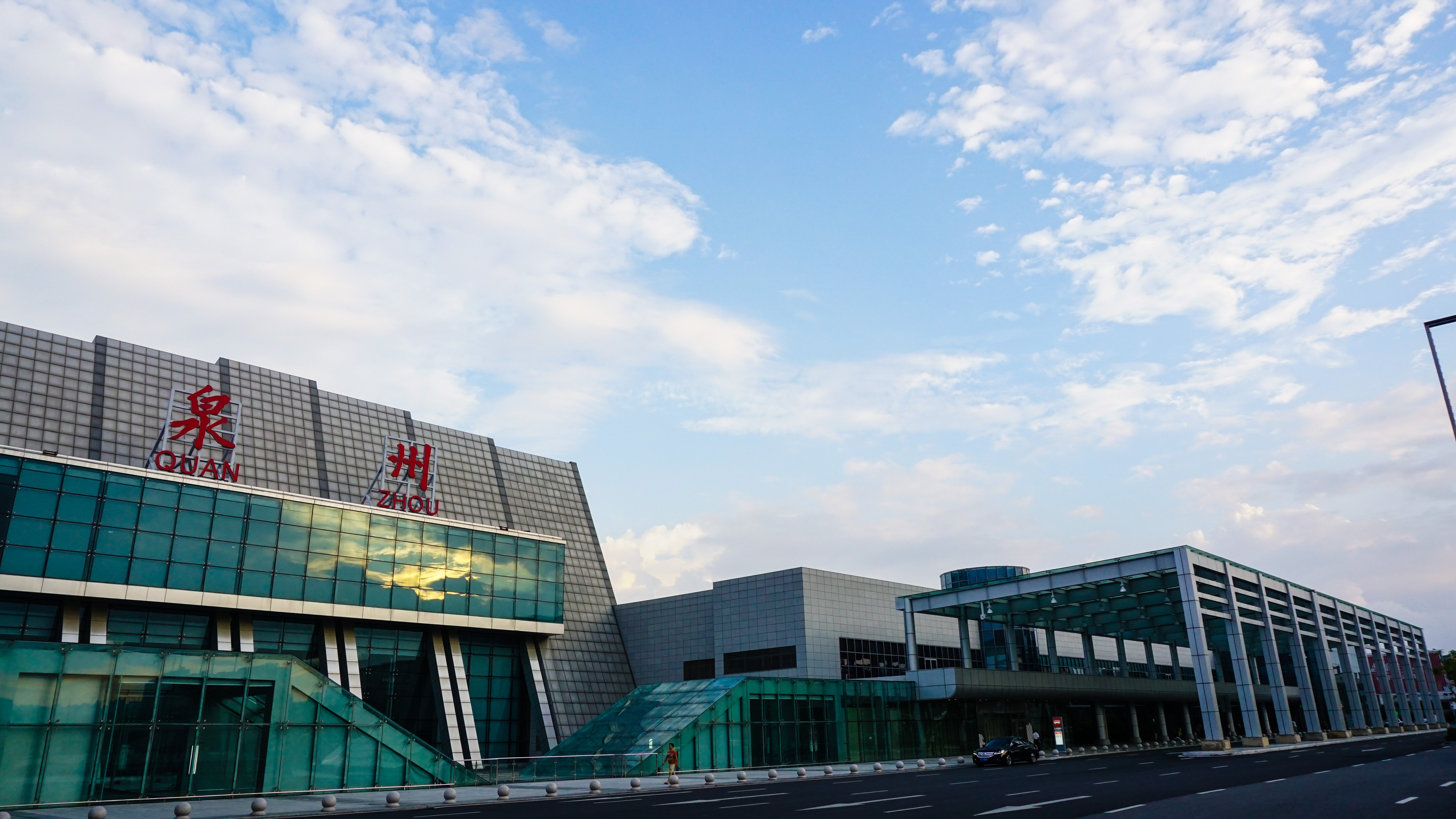
Quanzhou Jinjiang International Airport

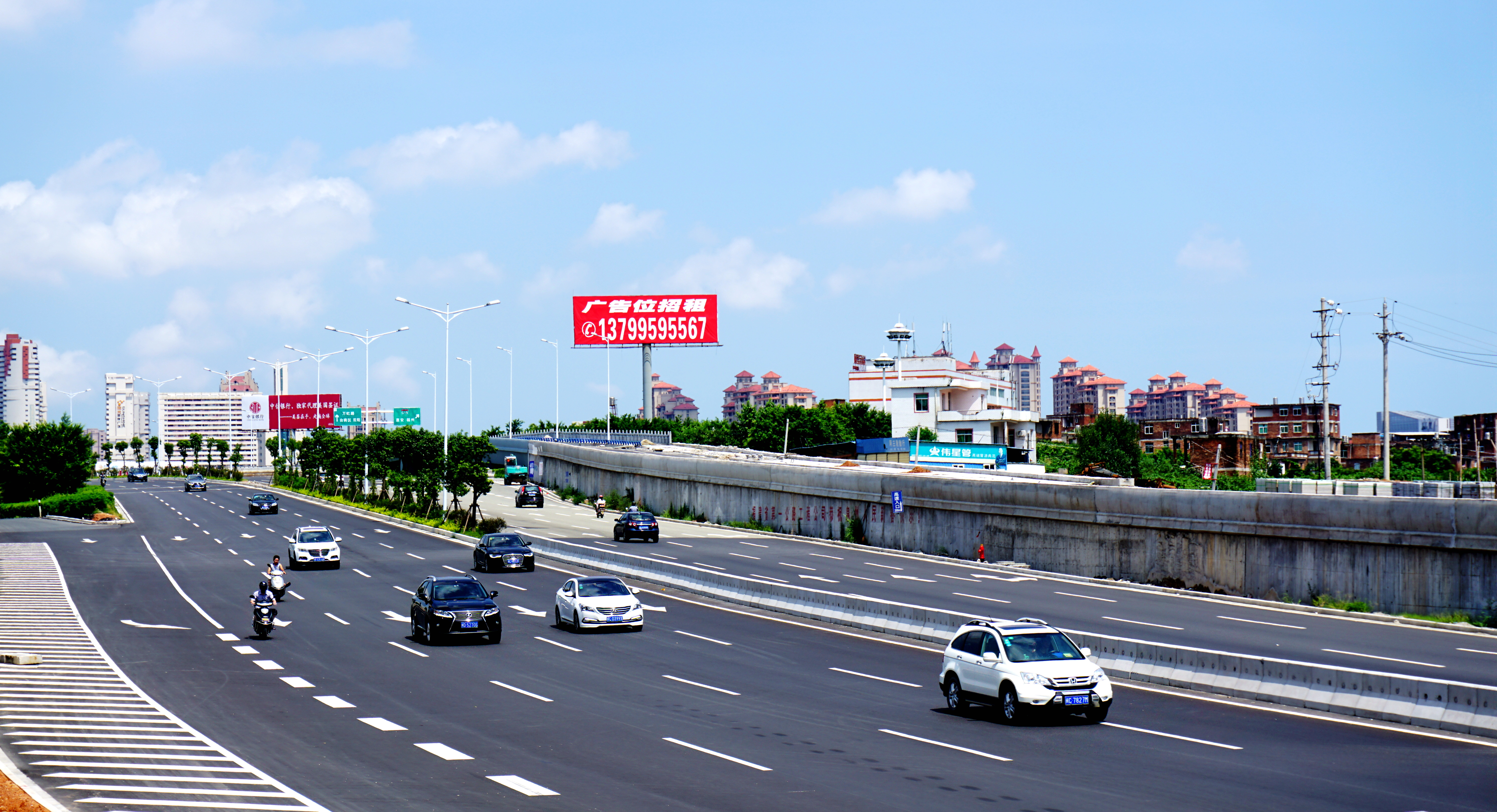
North Yingbin Avenue (G24) in Quanzhou

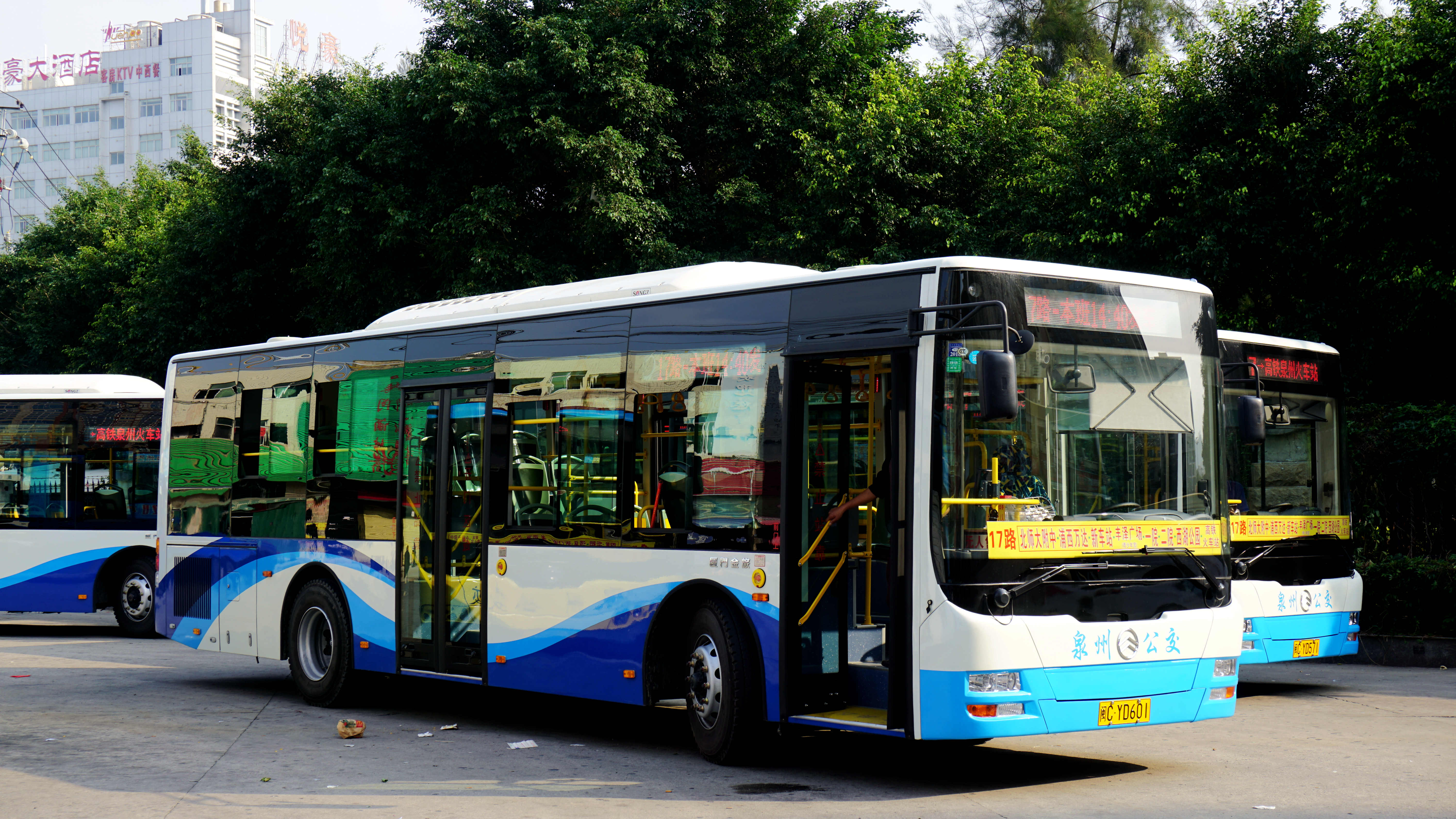
Buses in Quanzhou

Quanzhou is an important transport hub within southeastern Fujian province. Many export industries in the Fujian interior cities will transport goods to Quanzhou ports. Quanzhou Port was one of the most prosperous port in Tang dynasty and is now still an important Chinese port for exporting.

There is a passenger ferry terminal in Shijing, Nan'an, Fujian, with regular service to the Shuitou Port in the ROC-controlled Kinmen Island.

=== Airport ===
Quanzhou Jinjiang International Airport is Quanzhou's sole airport, served by passenger flights within mainland China and other regional/international destinations throughout southeast Asia, including Hong Kong, Macau, Manila, Kuala Lumpur, Bangkok etc. Major airlines operated in JJN are Xiamen Air, Shenzhen Airlines and West Air.

=== Railway ===
The Zhangping–Quanzhou–Xiaocuo railway connects several cargo stations within Quanzhou Prefecture with the interior of Fujian and the rest of the country. Until 2014 this line also had passenger service, with fairly slow passenger trains from Beijing.

Passenger trains from China terminated at the Quanzhou East Railway Station, a few kilometers northeast of the center of the city. Passenger service on this line was terminated, and Quanzhou East railway station closed 9 December 2014.

Since 2010, Quanzhou has been served by the high-speed Fuzhou–Xiamen railway, a part of the Hangzhou–Fuzhou–Shenzhen high-speed railway, which runs along China's southeastern sea coast. High-speed trains on this line stop at Quanzhou railway station (in Beifeng Subdistrict of Fengze District, some 10 miles north of Quanzhou city center) and Jinjiang railway station. Trains to Xiamen take under 45 minutes, making it a convenient weekend or day trip. By 2015, direct high-speed service was made available to a number of cities in the country's interior, from Beijing to Chongqing and Guiyang.

The Quanzhou–Xiamen–Zhangzhou Intercity Railway Line, as the name suggests, connecting the cities of Quanzhou, Xiamen, and Zhangzhou is currently conducting on-site surveys.

=== Long-distance bus ===
Long-distance bus services also run daily/nightly to Shenzhen and other major cities. Quanzhou bus station operated from 1990 to 2020.

== Colleges and universities ==
Colleges and universities with Undergraduate education:

- Huaqiao University (national)
- Quanzhou Normal University (public)
- Jinjiang Campus of Fuzhou University (public)
- Quangang Campus of College of Chemical Engineering, Fuzhou University (public)
- Anxi College of Tea Science (College of Digital Economy), Fujian Agriculture and Forestry University (public)
- Second School of Clinical Medicine, Fujian Medical University (public)
- Yang-en University (private)
- Minnan University of Science and Technology (private)
- Minnan Science and Technology College (private)
- Quanzhou University of Information Engineering (private)
- Jinjiang Campus of Fuzhou University Zhicheng College (private)
- Quangang Campus of Fuzhou University Zhicheng College (private)
- Jinshan College of Fujian Agriculture and Forestry University (Anxi) (private)
- Quanzhou Vocational and Technical University (vocational, private)

Vocational school:

- Liming Vocational University (public)
- Quanzhou Medical College (public)
- Quanzhou Preschool Education College (public)
- Fujian Electric Power Technical College (public)
- Quanzhou Vocational College of Economics and Business (public)
- Quanzhou Arts And Crafts Vocational College (public)
- Quanzhou Engineering Vocational and Technical College (private)
- Quanzhou College of Technology (private)
- Quanzhou Textile Garment Institute (private)
- Quanzhou Ocean Institute (private)
- Quanzhou Huaguang Vocational College (private)

== Culture ==
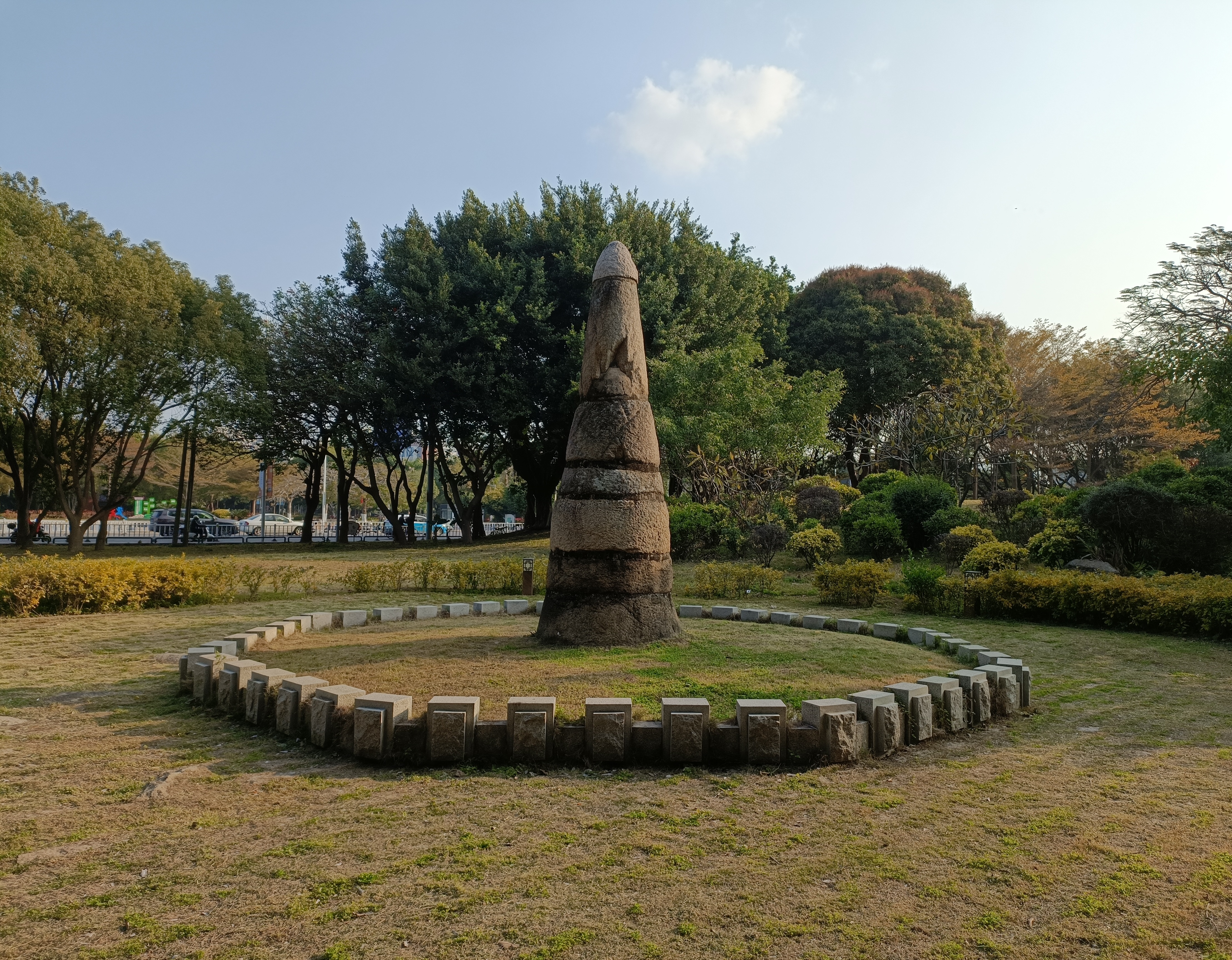
Shisun Park

Quanzhou is listed as one of the 24 famous historic cultural cities first approved by the Chinese government. Notable cultural practices include:

- Liyuan Opera (梨园戏)
- Puppet Show (提线木偶戏)
- Gaojia Opera (高甲戏)
- Dacheng Opera (打城戏)
- Nanyin (南音), a musical style dating to the Han but performed in the local dialect
- Quanzhou Shaolin Five Ancestors Fist (泉州五祖拳)
- Yongchun martial arts

The city hosted the Sixth National Peasants' Games in 2008. Signature local dishes include rice dumplings and oyster omelettes.

Notable Historical and cultural sites (the 18 views of Quanzhou as recommended by the Fujian tourism board) include the Ashab Mosque and Kaiyuan Temple mentioned above, as well as:

- Qing Yuan mountain (清源山) – The tallest hill within the city limits, which hosts a great view of West lake.
- East Lake Park (东湖) – Located in the city center. It is home to a small zoo.
- West Lake Park (西湖公园) – The largest body of fresh water within the city limits.
- Scholar Street (状元街) – Champion street about 500 meters long, elegant environment, mainly engaged in tourism and cultural crafts.

Notable Modern cultural sites include:

- Fengze Square – Located in the city center and acts as a venue for shows and events.
- Dapingshan – The second tallest hill within the city limits, crowned with an enormous equestrian statue of Zheng Chenggong.
- The Embassy Lounge – Situated in the "1916 Cultural Ideas Zone" which acts as a platform for mixing traditional Chinese art with modern building techniques and designs

Relics from Quanzhou's past are preserved at the Maritime or Overseas-Relations History Museum. It includes large exhibits on Song-era ships and Yuan-era tombstones. A particularly important exhibit is the so-called Quanzhou ship, a seagoing junk that sunk some time after 1272 and was recovered in 1973–74.

The old city center preserves "balcony buildings" (骑楼; qílóu), a style of southern Chinese architecture from the Republican Era.

== Notable residents ==
- Li Nu, merchant and scholar
- Zhang Wenyu, nuclear physicist born in Hui'an. He was also a member of the Chinese Academy of Sciences.
- Lin Junde, explosion mechanics scientist born in Yongchun in Quanzhou.
- Xie Xide, physicist born in Shishi, president of Fudan University
- Guo Guangcan, quantum physicist born in Hui'an.
- Yao Chen, actress born in Shishi in Quanzhou.

== Villages ==
- Xunpu

== Gallery ==
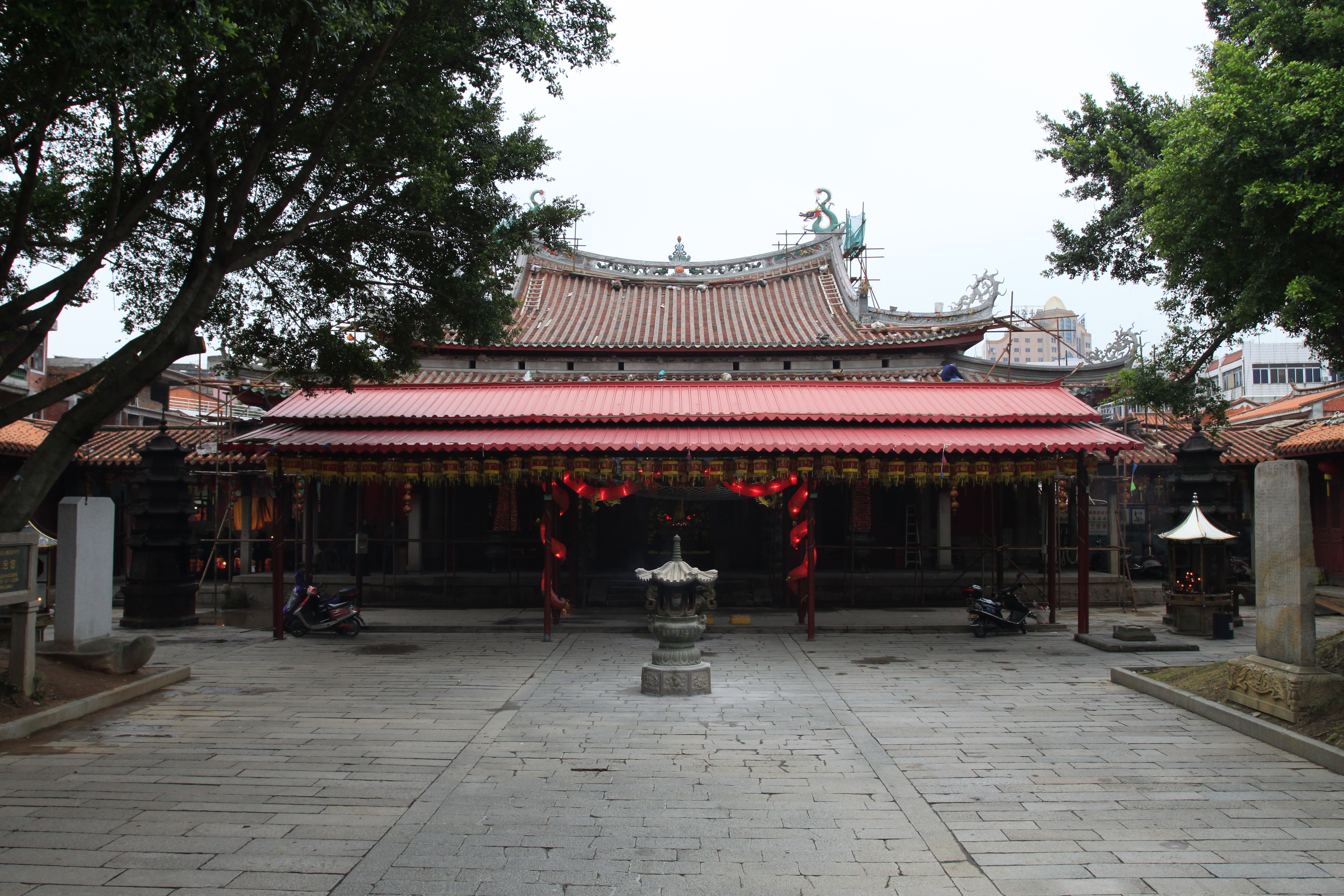
Quanzhou Tianhou Temple

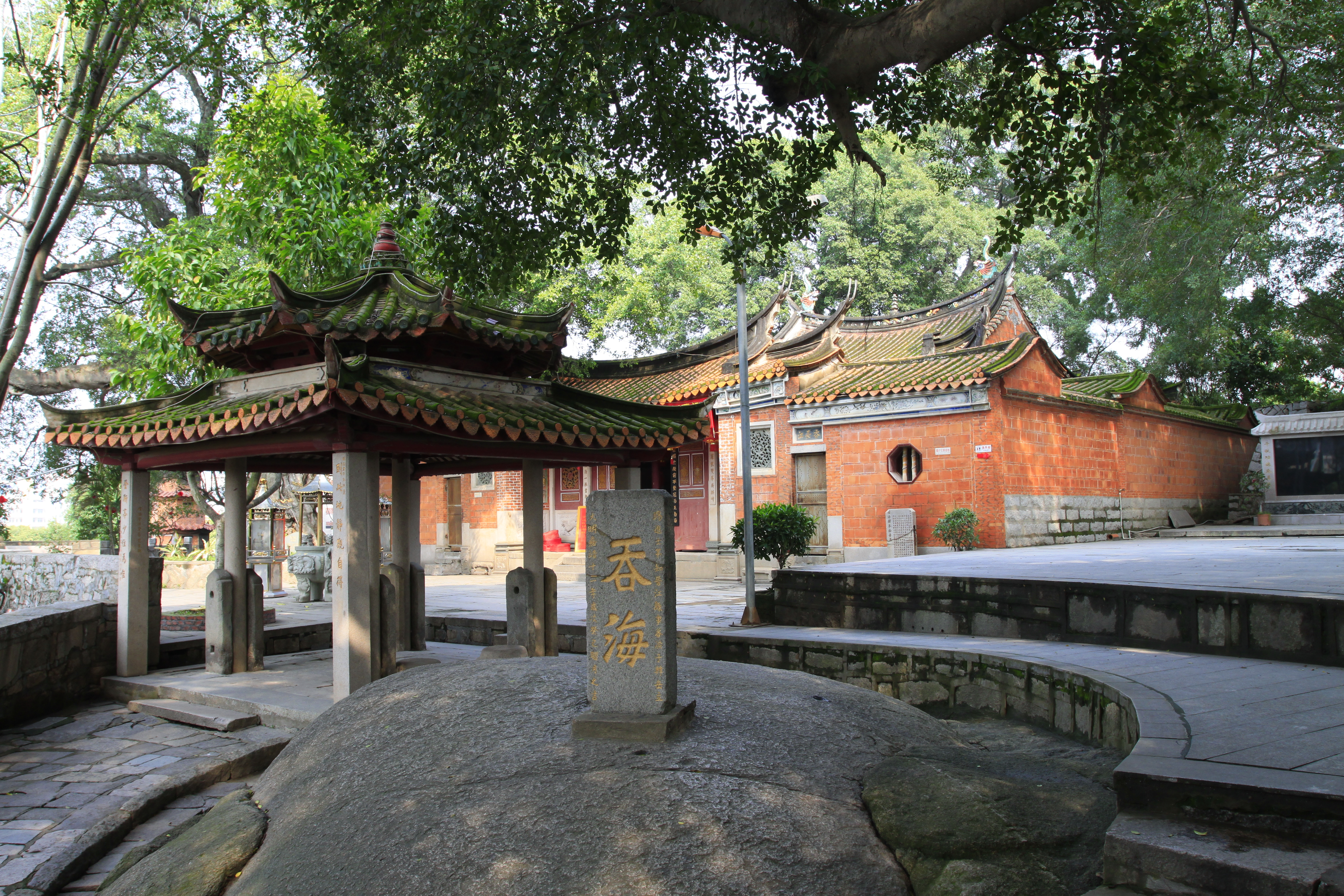
Quanzhou Zhenwu Temple

== General and cited references ==
- Yule, Henry (1878), "Chinchew" , in Baynes, T. S. (ed.), Encyclopædia Britannica, vol. 5 (9th ed.), New York: Charles Scribner's Sons, p. 673
- Chisholm, Hugh, ed. (1911), "Chinchew" , Encyclopædia Britannica, vol. 6 (11th ed.), Cambridge University Press, p. 231
- Ibn Battúta (1929). Gibb, H.A.R.; Eileen Power; E. Denison Ross (eds.). Travels in Asia and Africa. The Broadway Travellers. Routledge & Kegan Paul. Book II, Ch. XI. ISBN 9780415344739.
- Gibb, H.A.R. (2010). The Travels of Ibn Battuta, AD 1325-1354, Volume IV.
- Schottenhammer, Angela (2008). The East Asian Mediterranean: Maritime Crossroads of Culture, Commerce, and Human Migration. Otto Harrassowitz Verlag. ISBN 978-3-447-05809-4.
- Schottenhammer, Angela (2010). "Transfer of Xiangyao 香藥 from Iran and Arabia to China: A Reinvestigation of Entries in the Youyang Zazu 酉陽雜俎 (863)". Aspects of the Maritime Silk Road: From the Persian Gulf to the East China Sea. East Asian Maritime History. Vol. 10. Wiesbaden: Harrassowitz Verlag. p. 145. ISBN 9783447061032.
- Marco Polo (1903). "Of the City and Great Haven of Zayton". In Yule, Henry (ed.). The Book of Ser Marco Polo the Venetian Concerning the Kingdoms and Marvels of the East. Vol. II (3rd ed.). Courier Corporation. ISBN 9780486275871., annotated by Henri Cordier in 1920, London: John Murray.
