= Fengze, Quanzhou =

Settlement in Quanzhou, Fujian, China

Fengze 丰泽区
- District
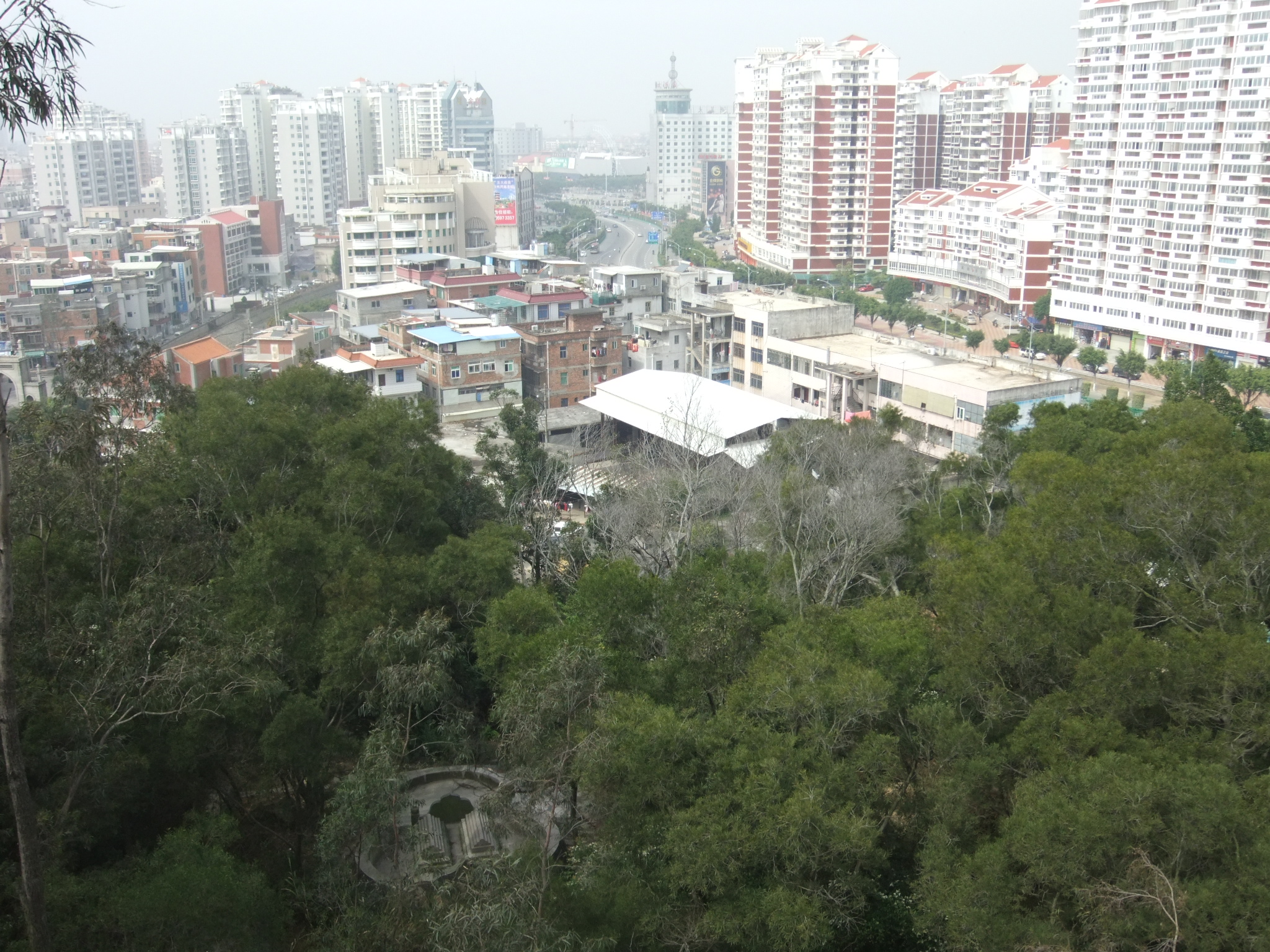
- A section of Fengze District, seen from Lingshan Park

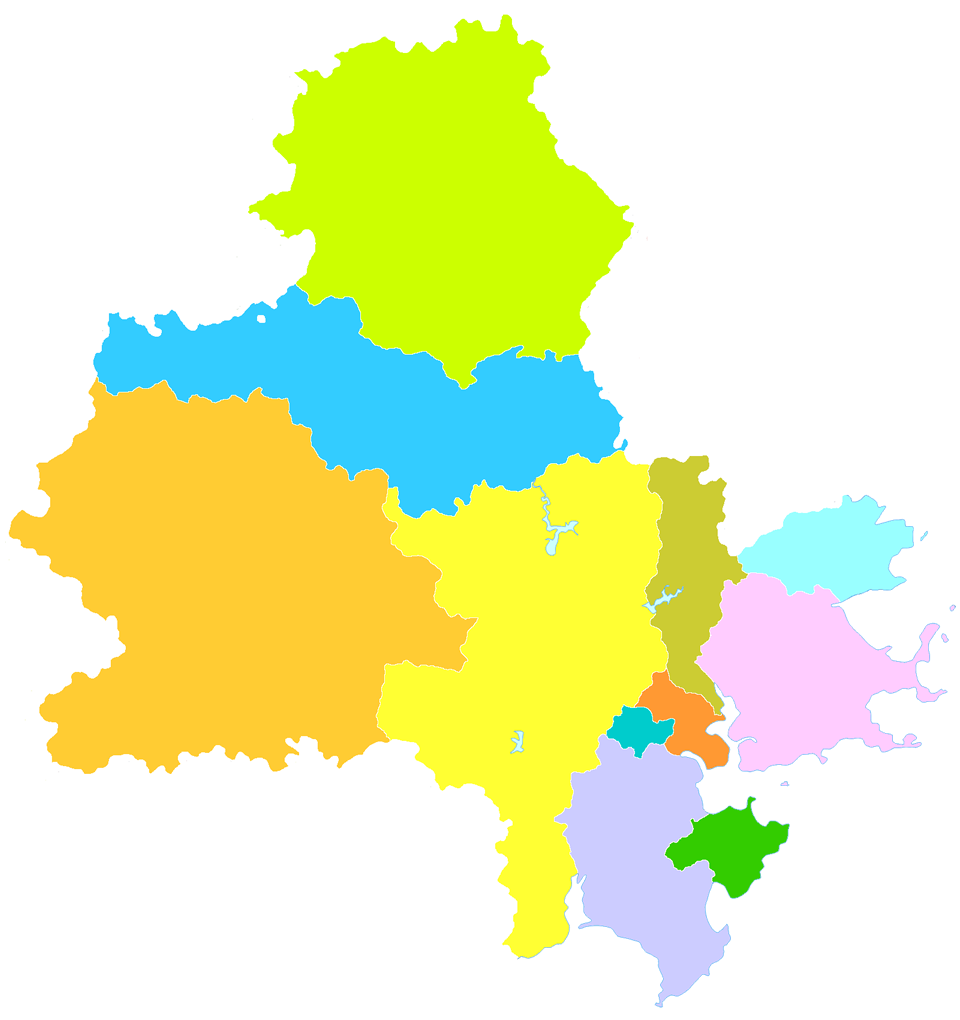
- Fengze District in Quanzhou

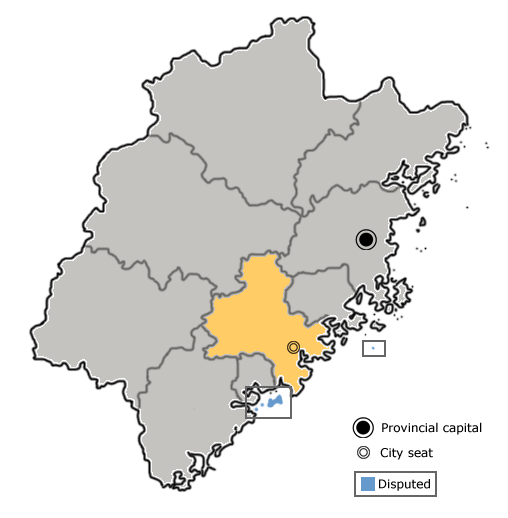
- Quanzhou in Fujian
- Coordinates: 24°53′16″N 118°37′43″E
- Country: People's Republic of China
- Province: Fujian
- Prefecture-level city: Quanzhou

Area
  - Total: 126.5 km^{2} (48.8 sq mi)

Population (2020)
  - Total: 698,557
  - Density: 5,522/km^{2} (14,300/sq mi)
- Time zone: UTC+8 (China Standard)
- Postal code: 362000
- Area code: 0595
- Website: Official Website

Fengze (Fengze; simplified Chinese: 丰泽区; traditional Chinese: 豐澤區; pinyin: Fēngzé Qū; Pe̍h-ōe-jī: Hong-te̍k Khu) is a district of the city of Quanzhou, Fujian province, China. It has an area of 126.5 square kilometres (48.8 sq mi) and a population of 698,557 as of 2020.

Fengze District occupies most of Quanzhou Prefecture-level City's central urban area (the place that is marked as "Quanzhou" on most maps), with the exception of several square kilometers on the west and southwest sides of downtown, which belongs to Licheng District. Although most of Quanzhou's historical and cultural center is in that area falling into Licheng District, most of the new developments are in Fengze District.

== Administrative divisions ==
Fengze District has eight subdistricts under its jurisdiction:

- Xiuquan (泉秀街道)
- Fengze (丰泽街道)
- Donghu (东湖街道)
- Huada (华大街道)
- Qingyuan (清源街道)
- Chengdong (城东街道)
- Donghai (东海街道)
- Beifeng (北峰街道)
