= Wuyi University (Fujian) =

Public university in Wuyishan, Fujian, China

- 武夷学院
- Motto: 涵养穷索 致知力行
- Type: Public
- Established: 1958
- Academic staff: 1,100
- Students: 15,000
- Location: Wuyishan, Fujian, China; 27.731°N 117.999°E
- Campus: 200 hectares (490 acres); Urban
- Website: www.wuyiu.edu.cn

Chinese name
- Simplified Chinese: 武夷学院
- Traditional Chinese: 武夷學院
Transcriptions
Standard Mandarin
- Hanyu Pinyin: Wǔyí Xuéyuàn

Wuyi University (Chinese: 武夷学院) is a public university in Wuyishan, Fujian. It originated from a college founded in 1958, and has gradually moved from Nanping to Wuyishan since September 2003.

It was approved to establish a university on the original basis in 2007.
