= Zhangzhou College of Science and Technology =

College in Zhangzhou, China

Coordinates: 24.06747°N 117.50395°E

- Traditional Chinese: 天福茶學院
- Simplified Chinese: 天福茶学院
Transcriptions
Standard Mandarin
- Hanyu Pinyin: Tiānfú chá xuéyuàn
Southern Min
- Hokkien POJ: Thian-hok tê ha̍k-īⁿ

Tenfu Tea College, now called Zhangzhou College of Science and Technology (漳州科技学院), is the world's first private vocational college to specialize in the study of the tea industry. It is in Zhangzhou, Fujian, China. Degrees are offered in Tea Production and Processing (茶叶生产加工技术), Market Prospection and Marketing (市场开发与营销), Food Processing (食品加工技术), Tea Culture (茶文化), and Tourism Management (旅游管理).

== See also ==
- Tatung Institute of Commerce and Technology
- Lu-Yu Tea Culture Institute
- Ping-Lin Tea Museum
- Tenfu Tea Museum
- China National Tea Museum
- History of tea in China
