= Lu-Yu Tea Culture Institute =

- Traditional Chinese: 陸羽茶藝中心
- Simplified Chinese: 陆羽茶艺中心
Transcriptions
Standard Mandarin
- Hanyu Pinyin: Lùyǔ Cháyì Zhōngxīn

Lu-Yu Tea Culture Institute, previously known as Lu Yu Tea Art Center, provides education in tea arts (including tea marketing, design of tea ware, and tea brewing techniques) and promotes the drinking of tea. It offers certifications in Tea Studies, such as for "Tea Master" (陸羽泡茶師). The institute was founded in Taipei, Taiwan, in 1980. It now has schools in Beijing, Chengdu and Shanghai. It is named for Lu Yu, the 8th-century "sage of tea". While most students are Chinese speakers, others come from Japan, South Korea and there are also classes and tea studies certification in English.

== See also ==
- Tenfu Tea College
- Tatung Institute of Commerce and Technology
- History of tea in China
- Tea culture
- Tenfu Tea Museum
