= Xiangcheng, Zhangzhou =

Xiangcheng 芗城区
- District
- Location in Fujian
- Coordinates: 24°30′41″N 117°39′15″E
- Country: People's Republic of China
- Province: Fujian
- Prefecture-level city: Zhangzhou

Area
  - Total: 263.6 km^{2} (101.8 sq mi)

Population (2020 census)
  - Total: 638,060
  - Density: 2,421/km^{2} (6,269/sq mi)
- Time zone: UTC+8 (China Standard)

Xiangcheng District (simplified Chinese: 芗城区; traditional Chinese: 薌城區; pinyin: Xiāngchéng Qū; Pe̍h-ōe-jī: Hiang-sêng-khu) is a district and the seat of Zhangzhou, located in the province of Fujian, People's Republic of China.

== Location ==
Xiangcheng is surrounded by the Chuan Chiam Boey Mountains in the south, a bay in the north, the Khor Chu Village in the east, and the Hui Chor Village in the west, where the clan village residents with the surname Qiū (邱) are the majority.

Xiangcheng was developed as a clan village with specific surnames for more than 600 years since the Ming Dynasty, with various small communities settled within the clan were formed. Clusters of houses with red-tiled roofs scatter among the labyrinthine alleys, and westward, in the near mid-west of the village, the main street runs from north to south. In the middle part of it stands the marketplace. Xiangcheng is the second place where dominated by 邱 (Qiū, Khoo in Hokkien) surnames settlers, and the second is Penang, Malaysia.

The village has thirteen ancestral halls of different sizes, each representing a branch of the Qiu clan. There are two main temples in the village, namely the Cheng Soon Keong and the Hock Leng Keong. The former enshrines Ong Soon Yah and Tua Sai Yah, the patron saints of the Qiu clan, while the latter houses Poh Seh Tai Tay (保生大帝), the God of Medicine.

== Administrative divisions ==
Subdistricts:

- Dongputou Subdistrict (东铺头街道), Xiqiao Subdistrict (西桥街道), Xinqiao Subdistrict (新桥街道), Xiangkou Subdistrict (巷口街道), Nankeng Subdistrict (南坑街道), Tongbei Subdistrict (通北街道)

Towns:

- Punan (浦南镇), Tianbao (天宝镇), Zhishan (芝山镇), Shiting (石亭镇)

Other: Jinfeng Economic Development Zone (金峰经济开发区)

== Landmarks ==
The original Cheng Soon Keong temple collapsed due to lack of maintenance during the Cultural Revolution (1966~1976). The present building was rebuilt in 1997 with a donation of US$0.84 million from Leong San Tong Khoo Kongsi, Penang. Situated at the downstream of Jiulong River, Xiangcheng was near the trading ports of Southern China from where people of Southern Fujian went overseas during the Ming and Qing Dynasties.

In 1567, Yuegang (月港), a new port which was located about 22 kilometres (14 mi) from Xiangjiang, replaced Zhangzhou as the major port in Southern Fujian. Yuegang was then superseded by Amoy during the Qing dynasty.
