= Changtai, Zhangzhou =

Changtai 长泰区
- District
- Location of the seat in Fujian
- Coordinates: 24°41′N 117°47′E
- Country: People's Republic of China
- Province: Fujian
- Prefecture-level city: Zhangzhou

Area
  - Total: 2,034 km^{2} (785 sq mi)

Population (2020)
  - Total: 228,235
  - Density: 112.2/km^{2} (290.6/sq mi)
- Time zone: UTC+8 (China Standard)

Changtai, Zhangzhou
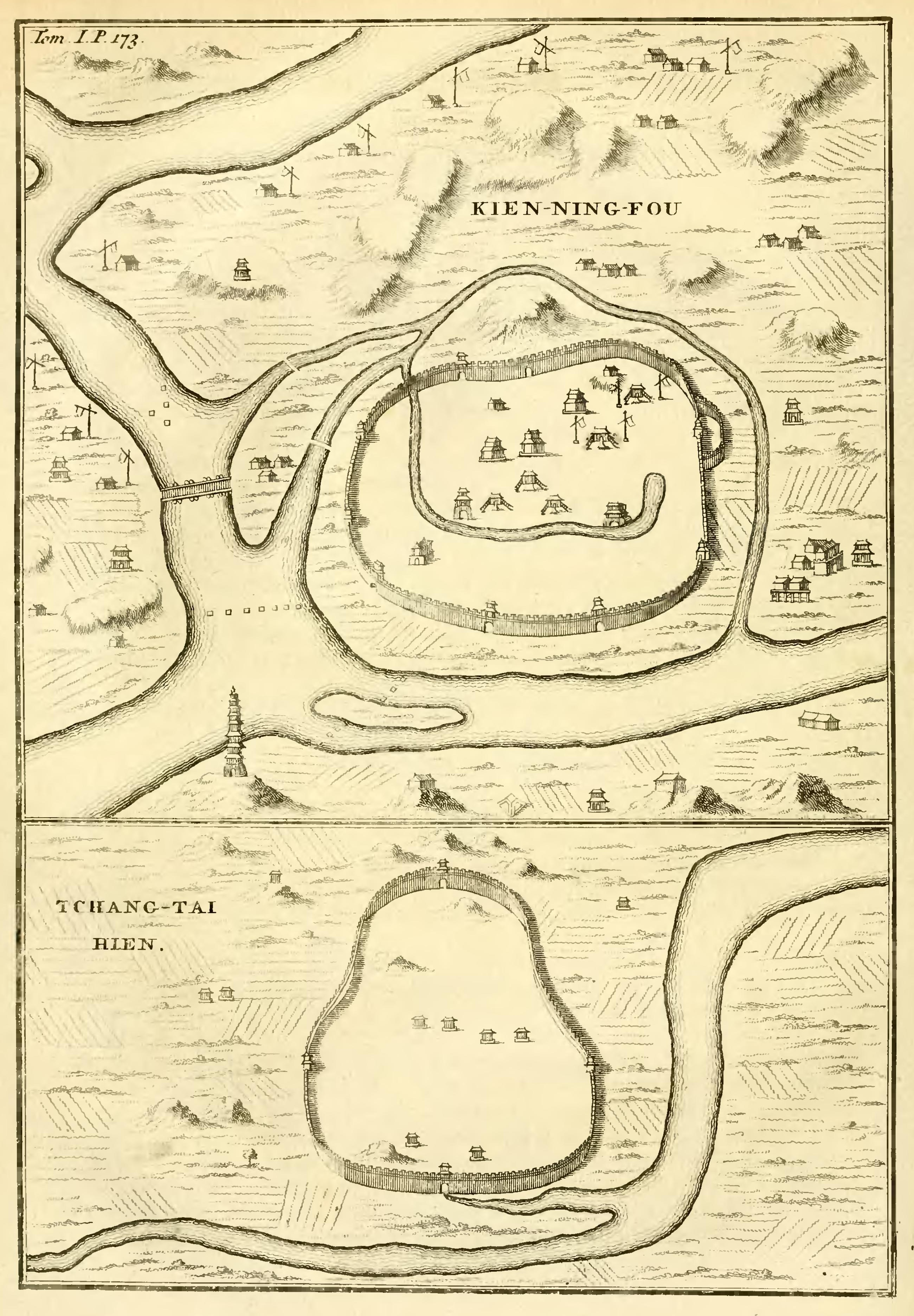
- Maps of "Kien-ning-fou" and "Tchang-tai-hien" from Du Halde's 1735 Description of China, based on Jesuit accounts
- Traditional Chinese: 長泰區
- Simplified Chinese: 长泰区
Transcriptions
Standard Mandarin
- Hanyu Pinyin: Chángtài Qū
- Wade–Giles: Ch‘ang-t‘ai Ch'ü
Southern Min
- Hokkien POJ: Tiô-thoà-kṳ̆

Changtai (Changtai District) is a district in Zhangzhou in southern Fujian Province in the People's Republic of China. It is located just outside Zhangzhou's central urban area.

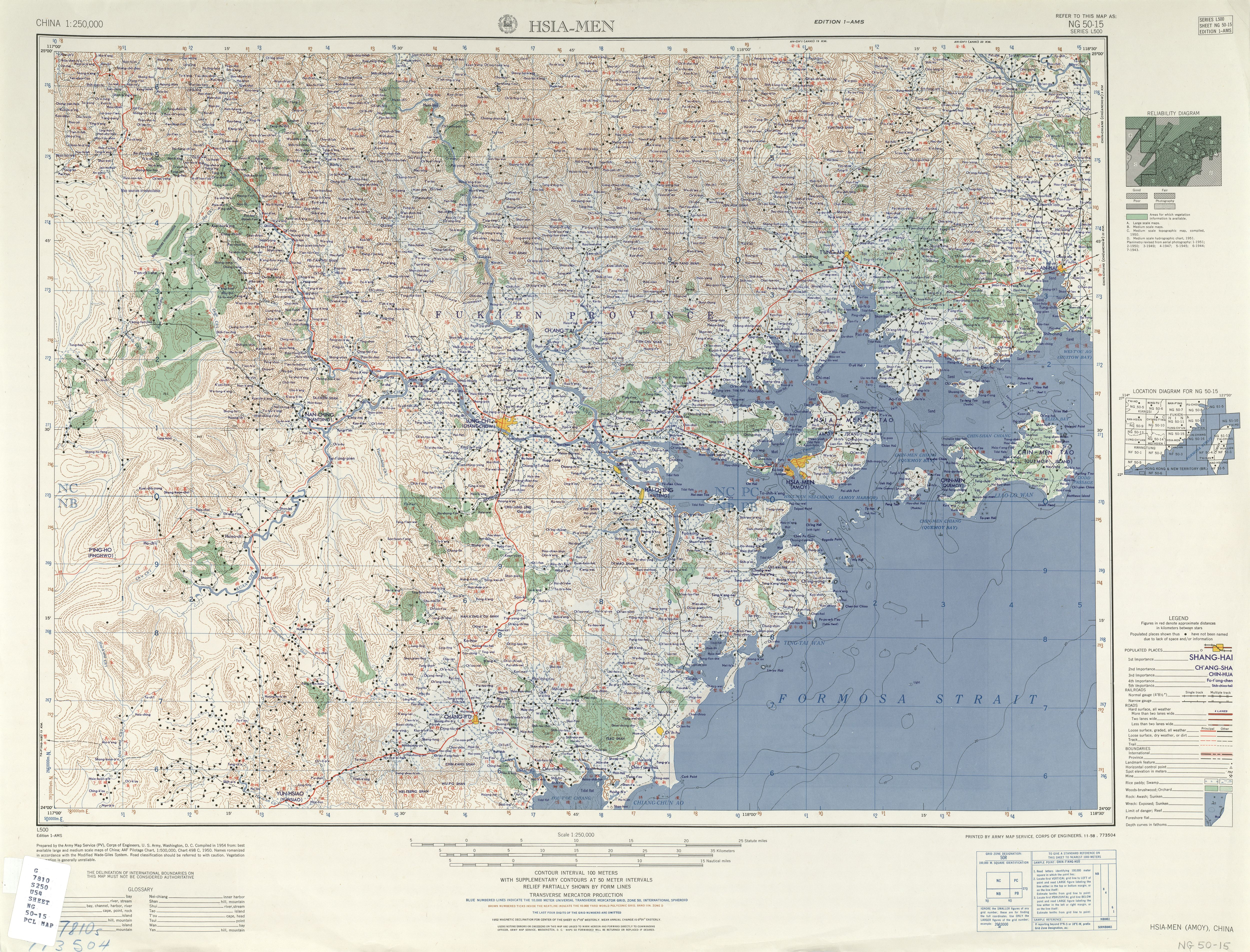
Map including Changtai (labeled as CH'ANG-T'AI 長泰) (1954)

== Local Dialect ==
The one and only local dialect of Changtai District is Hokkien, which is spoken with a unique Changtai accent that falls under the Zhangzhou Hokkien accent umbrella, but bears significant differences in pronunciation of certain Chinese characters from the well-known Zhangzhou city accent.

== Climate ==
Climate data for Changtai, elevation 43 m (141 ft), (1991–2020 normals, extremes 1951–2020)
Month	Jan	Feb	Mar	Apr	May	Jun	Jul	Aug	Sep	Oct	Nov	Dec	Year
Record high °C (°F)	29.6 (85.3)	31.3 (88.3)	33.3 (91.9)	35.6 (96.1)	37.9 (100.2)	38.4 (101.1)	39.6 (103.3)	38.5 (101.3)	38.4 (101.1)	36.8 (98.2)	35.2 (95.4)	30.2 (86.4)	39.6 (103.3)
Mean daily maximum °C (°F)	18.9 (66.0)	19.5 (67.1)	21.7 (71.1)	25.9 (78.6)	29.1 (84.4)	31.7 (89.1)	34.1 (93.4)	33.7 (92.7)	32.2 (90.0)	29.1 (84.4)	25.5 (77.9)	21.0 (69.8)	26.9 (80.4)
Daily mean °C (°F)	13.7 (56.7)	14.4 (57.9)	16.7 (62.1)	20.9 (69.6)	24.5 (76.1)	27.3 (81.1)	29.1 (84.4)	28.7 (83.7)	27.3 (81.1)	24.0 (75.2)	20.2 (68.4)	15.6 (60.1)	21.9 (71.4)
Mean daily minimum °C (°F)	10.4 (50.7)	11.3 (52.3)	13.6 (56.5)	17.7 (63.9)	21.4 (70.5)	24.4 (75.9)	25.6 (78.1)	25.4 (77.7)	23.9 (75.0)	20.2 (68.4)	16.4 (61.5)	12.0 (53.6)	18.5 (65.3)
Record low °C (°F)	−1.7 (28.9)	0.8 (33.4)	1.8 (35.2)	7.0 (44.6)	12.7 (54.9)	16.1 (61.0)	20.8 (69.4)	20.9 (69.6)	13.8 (56.8)	6.4 (43.5)	3.9 (39.0)	−1.6 (29.1)	−1.7 (28.9)
Average precipitation mm (inches)	49.6 (1.95)	74.3 (2.93)	116.4 (4.58)	133.5 (5.26)	194.7 (7.67)	280.8 (11.06)	210.3 (8.28)	243.4 (9.58)	160.1 (6.30)	51.5 (2.03)	39.1 (1.54)	45.4 (1.79)	1,599.1 (62.97)
Average precipitation days (≥ 0.1 mm)	8.4	11.3	13.9	13.8	16.3	17.5	12.5	15.1	11.0	4.5	5.2	6.7	136.2
Average relative humidity (%)	76	79	79	78	80	82	77	79	76	71	73	74	77
Mean monthly sunshine hours	136.2	105.2	106.7	123.5	137.3	157.3	234.7	209.1	191.8	195.7	165.5	155.4	1,918.4
Percentage possible sunshine	41	33	29	32	33	39	56	52	52	55	51	47	43
Source: China Meteorological Administrationall-time extremes

== Administrative divisions ==
Towns:

- Wu'an (武安镇), Yanxi (岩溪镇), Chenxiang (陈巷镇), Fangyang (枋洋镇)

The only township is Banli Township (坂里乡)
