= China National Tea Museum =

Tea museum in Hangzhou, China

- Chinese: 中国茶叶博物馆; pinyin: Zhōngguó Cháyè Bówùguǎn
- Location within Zhejiang Location within China
- Coordinates: 30°14′05″N 120°06′56″E

The China National Tea Museum (Chinese: 中国茶叶博物馆; pinyin: Zhōngguó Cháyè Bówùguǎn) is located in Hangzhou, Zhejiang province, China. The exhibitions display tea production, and different kinds of tea. Exhibitions are in Chinese and English languages.

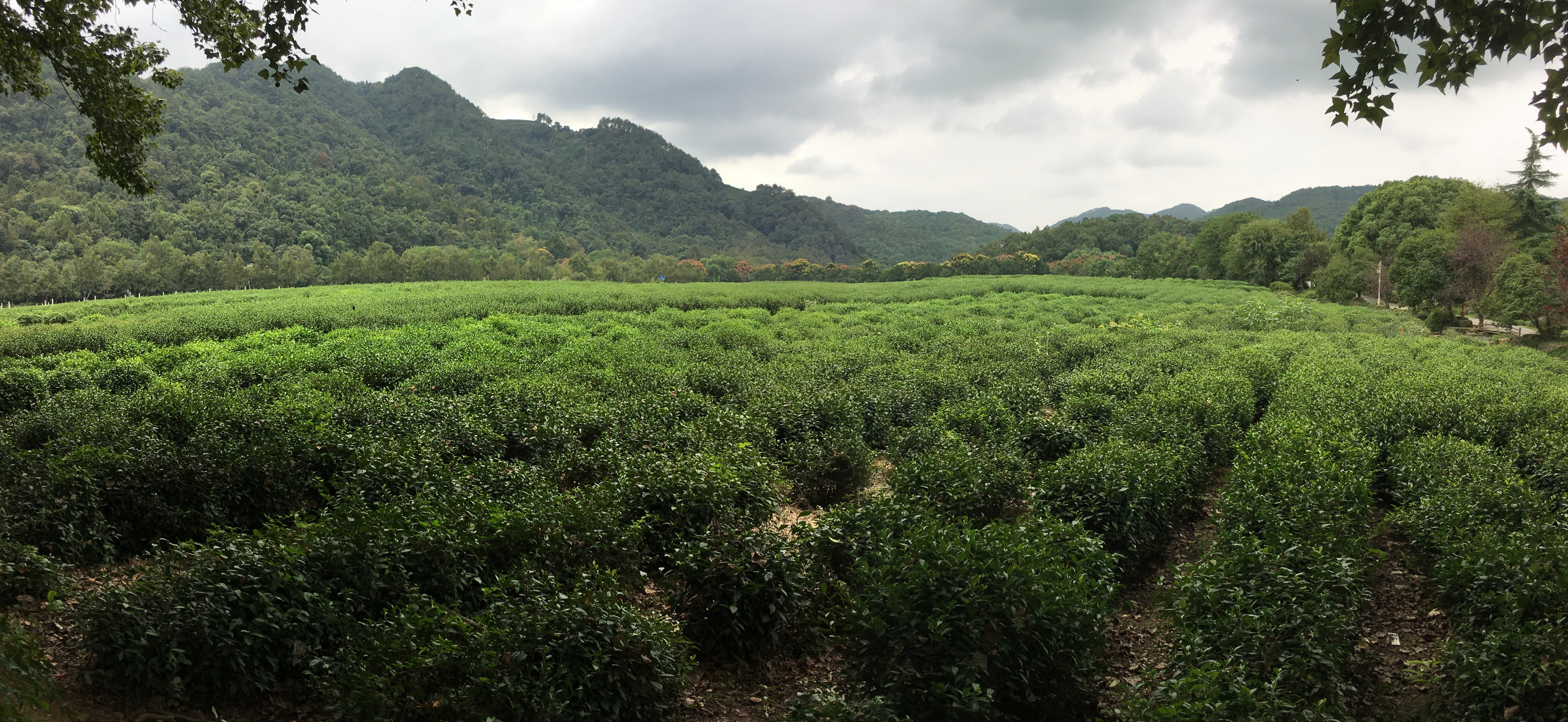
Tea plantation at the China National Tea Museum

== See also ==
- List of museums in China
- History of tea in China
- Tenfu Tea Museum
- List of food and beverage museums
