= Zhangzhou =

Zhangzhou 漳州市 Chiangchew
- Prefecture-level city
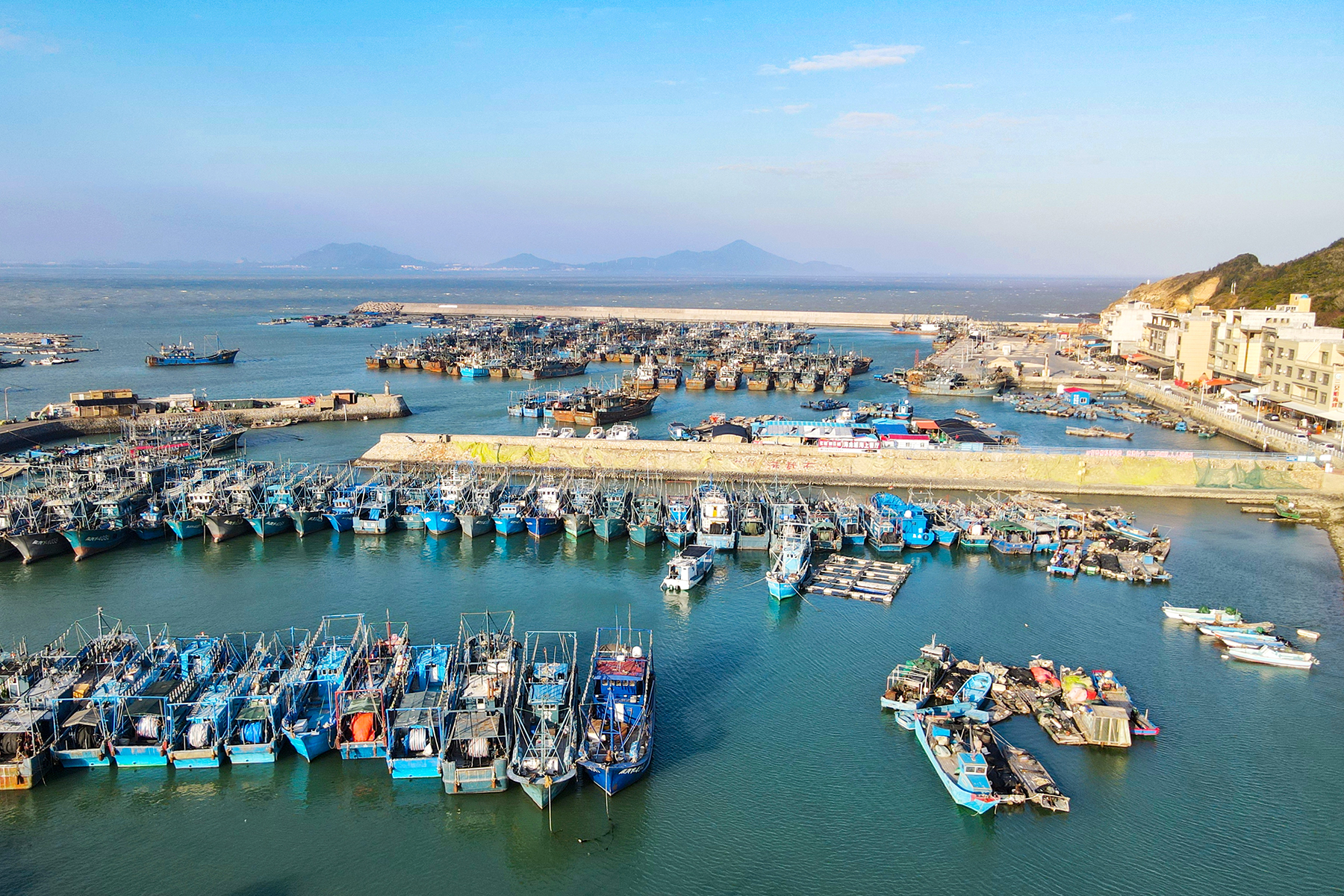
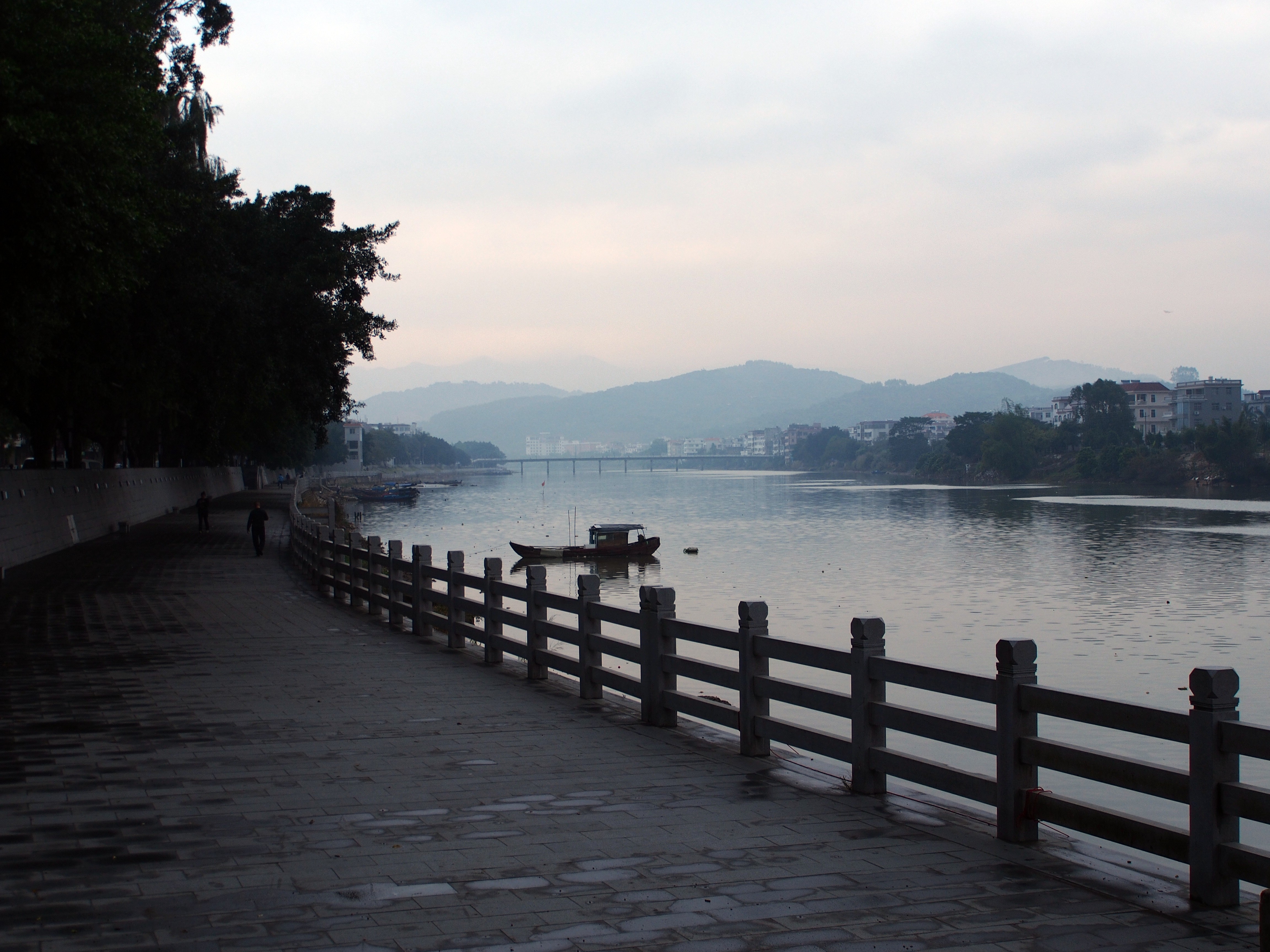
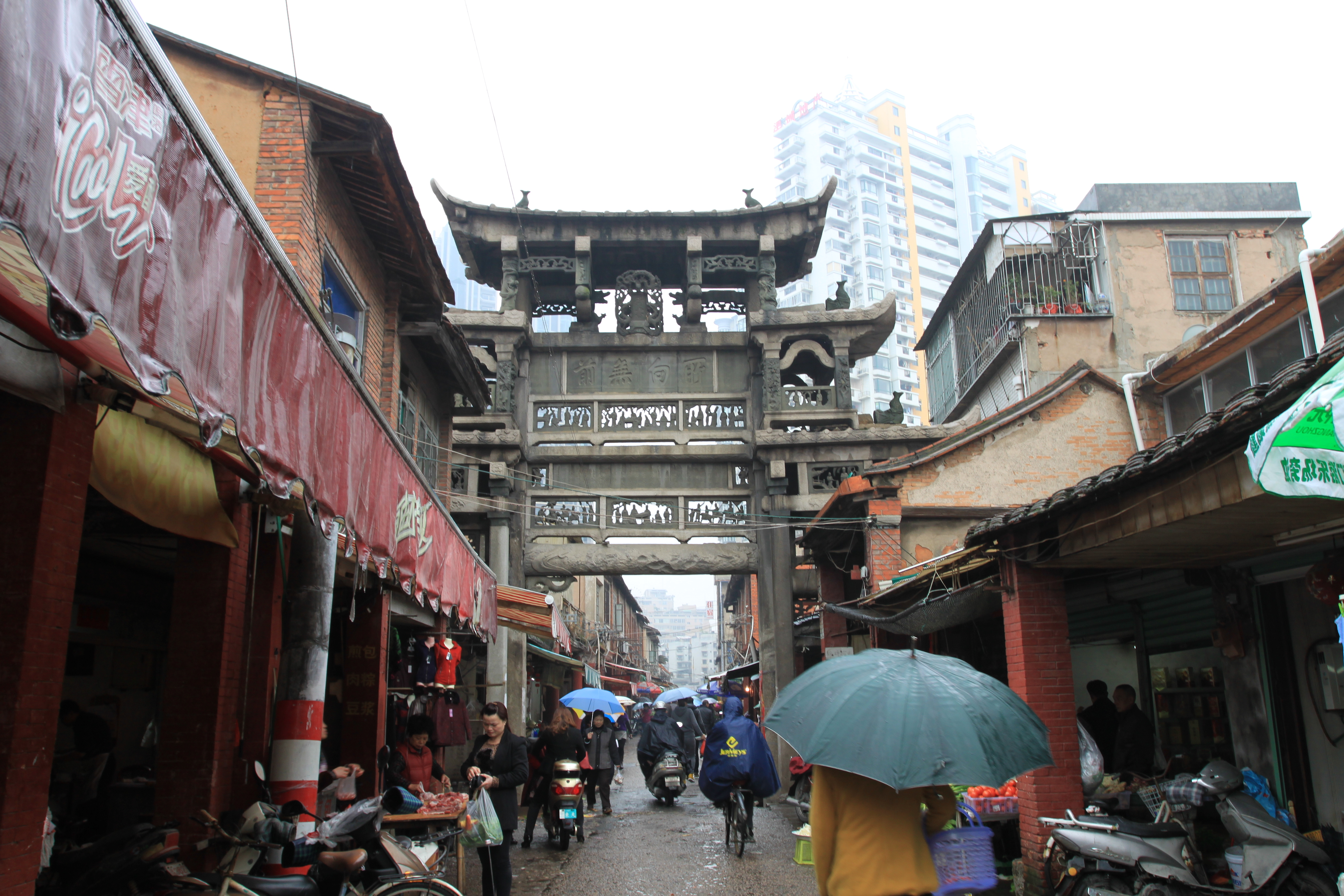
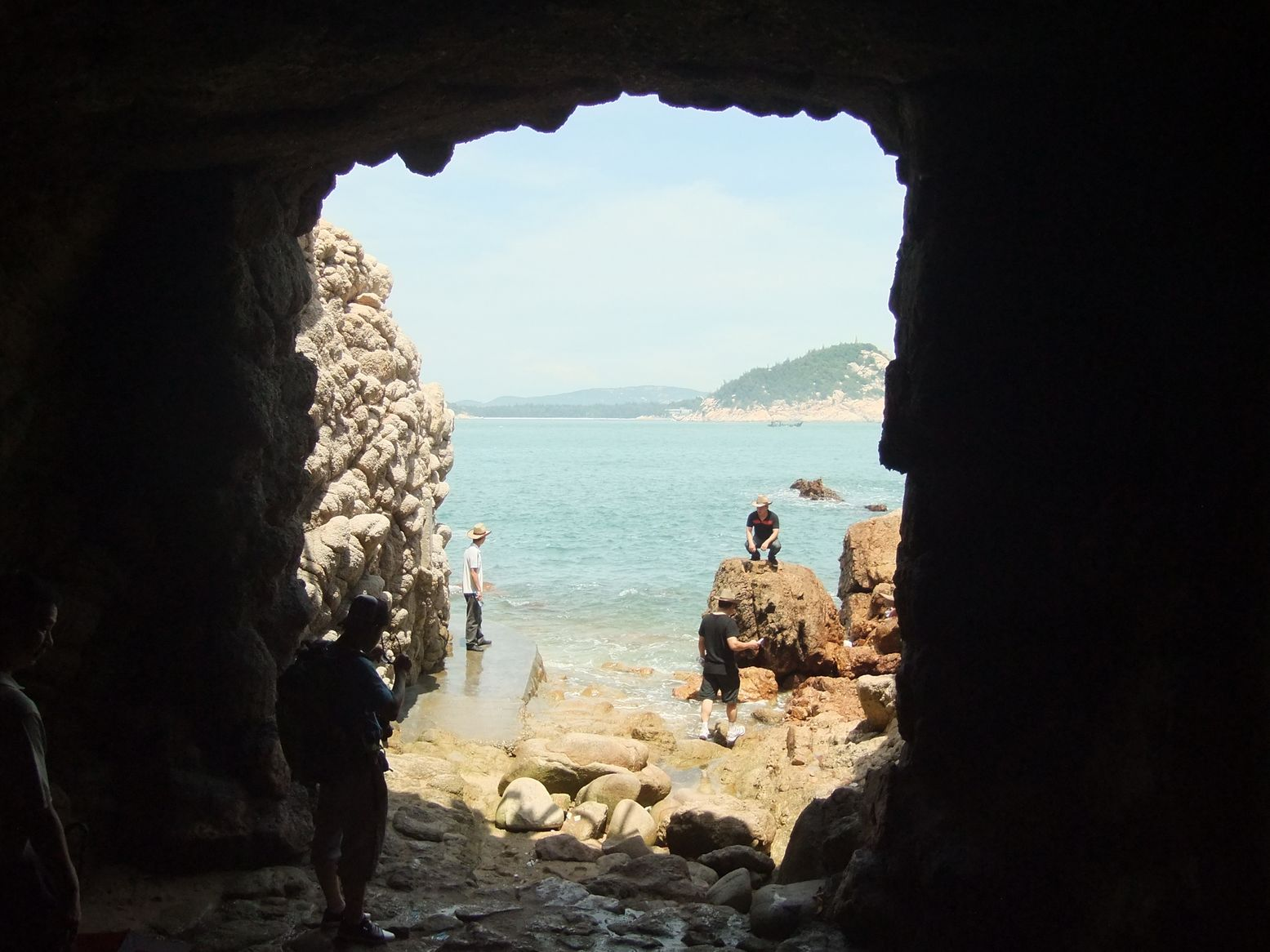
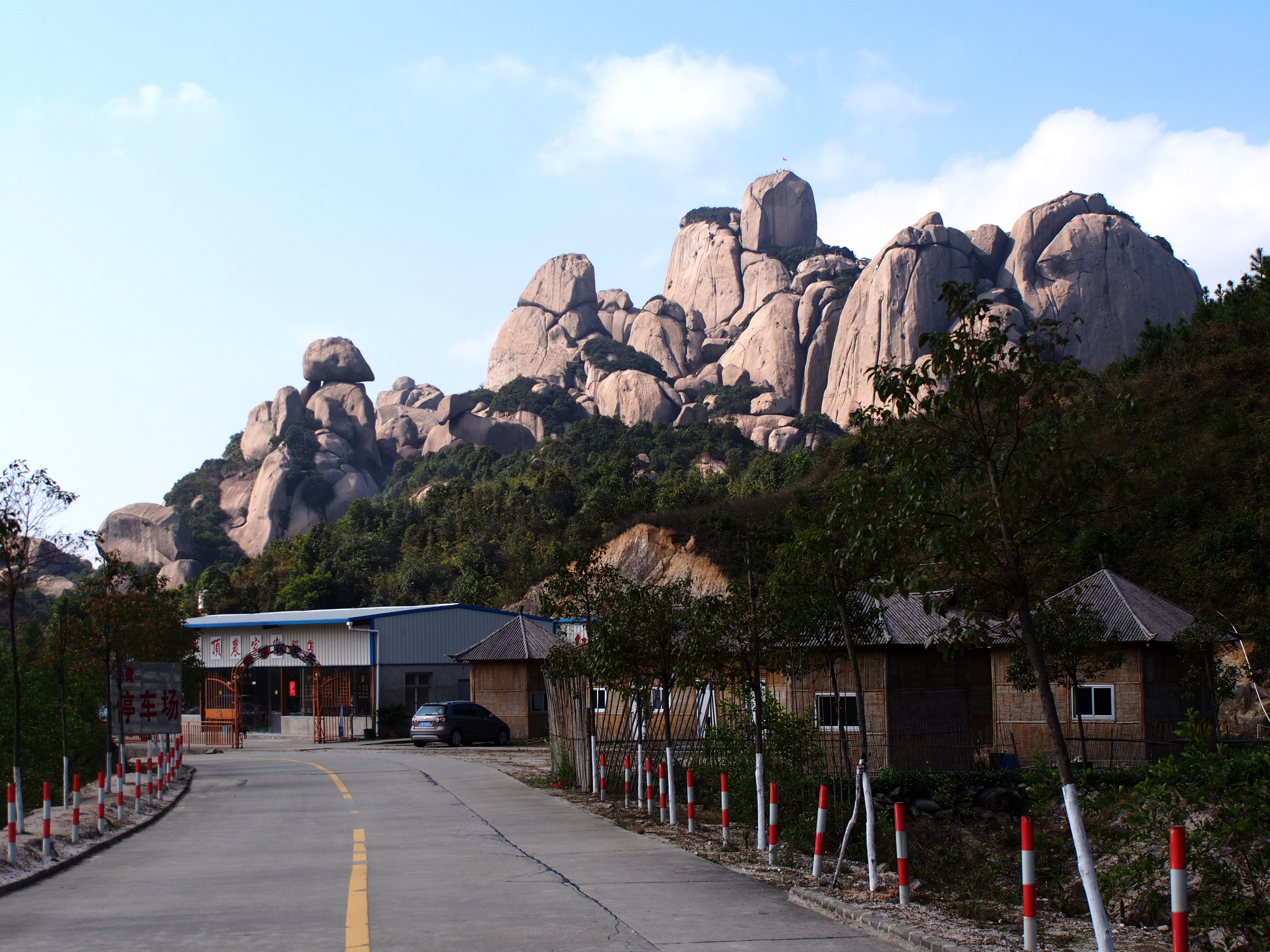
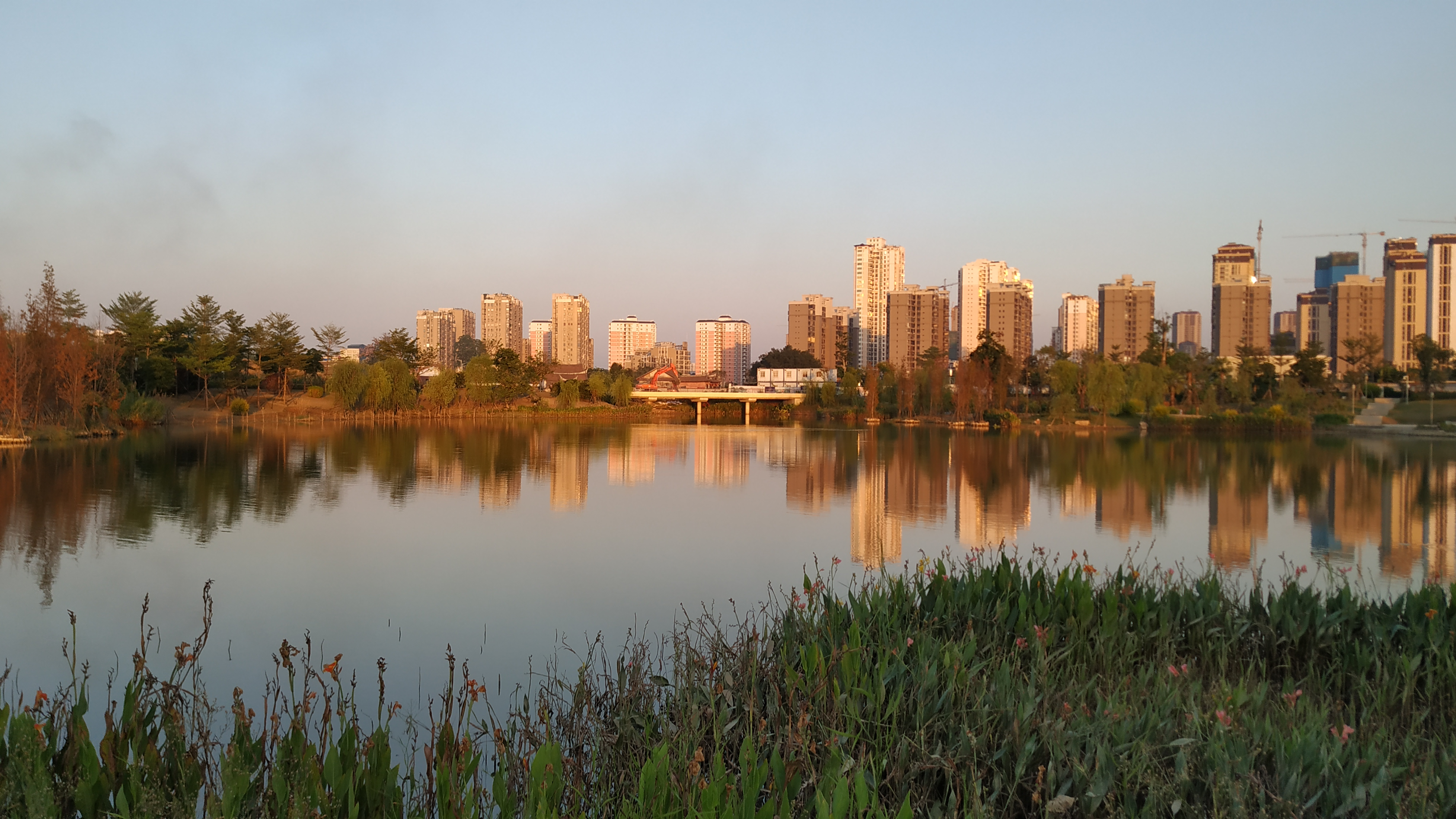
- Aojiao Village Jiulong River Ming-era stone archway in Xiangcheng Hukong Dropping Cave in Dongshan County Wushan Mountain West Ecological Park
- Location of Zhangzhou City jurisdiction in Fujian

- Location in China
- Coordinates (Zhangzhou municipal government): 24°30′47″N 117°38′49″E
- Country: People's Republic of China
- Province: Fujian
- Municipal seat: Xiangcheng District

Area
  - Prefecture-level city: 12,882.27 km^{2} (4,973.87 sq mi)
  - Urban: 2,590.23 km^{2} (1,000.09 sq mi)
  - Metro: 4,290.84 km^{2} (1,656.70 sq mi)

Population (2020 census)
  - Prefecture-level city: 5,054,328
  - Density: 392.3476/km^{2} (1,016.176/sq mi)
  - Urban: 939,943
  - Urban density: 362.880/km^{2} (939.855/sq mi)
  - Metro: 7,284,148
  - Metro density: 1,697.60/km^{2} (4,396.77/sq mi)

GDP
  - Prefecture-level city: CN¥ 454.6 billion US$ 65.9 billion
  - Per capita: CN¥ 89,834; US$ 14,107
- Time zone: UTC+8 (CST)
- Postal code: 363000
- Area code: 596
- ISO 3166 code: CN-FJ-06
- License Plate: 闽E
- Local dialect: Min Nan: Zhangzhou dialect
- City trees: Cinnamomum camphora
- City flowers: Narcissus tazetta
- Website: zhangzhou.gov.cn

Zhangzhou
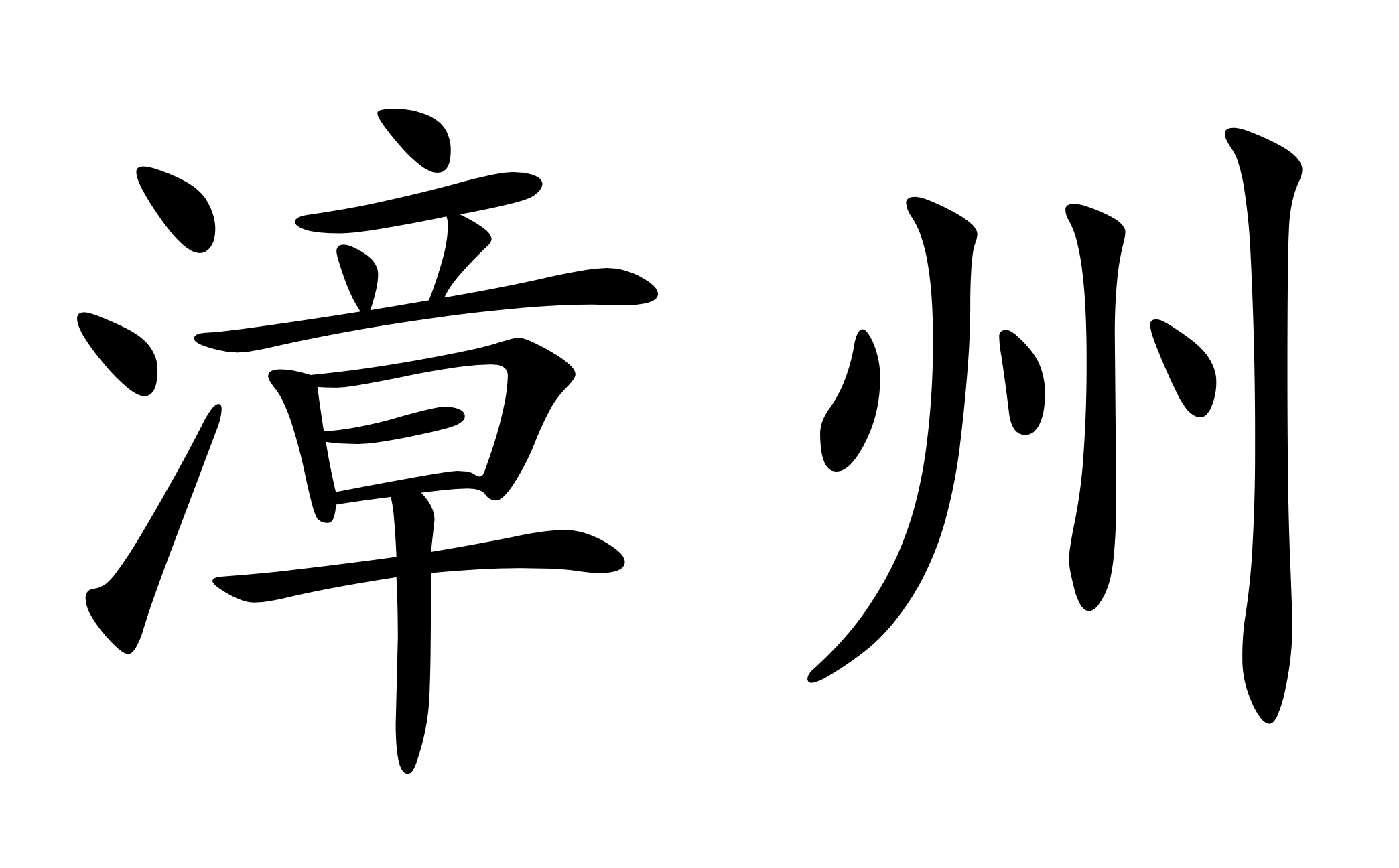
- "Zhangzhou" in regular Chinese characters
- Chinese: 漳州
- Postal: Changchow
Transcriptions
Standard Mandarin
- Hanyu Pinyin: Zhāngzhōu
- Bopomofo: ㄓㄤ ㄓㄡ
- Gwoyeu Romatzyh: Jangjou
- Wade–Giles: Chang¹-chou¹
- IPA: [ʈʂáŋ.ʈʂóʊ]
Southern Min
- Hokkien POJ: Chiang-chiu
- Tâi-lô: Tsiang-tsiu

Zhangzhou (/ˈdʒæŋˈdʒoʊ/, Mandarin: [ʈʂáŋ.ʈʂóʊ]) is a prefecture-level city in Fujian Province, China. The prefecture around the city proper comprises the southeast corner of the province, facing the Taiwan Strait and (with Quanzhou) surrounding the prefecture of Xiamen.

== Name ==
Zhangzhou is the atonal pinyin romanization of the city's Chinese name 漳州, using its pronunciation in Standard Mandarin. The name derives from the city's former status as the seat of the imperial Chinese Zhang Prefecture. The same name was romanized as Changchow on the Chinese Postal Map and Chang-chou in Wade-Giles. Other romanizations include Chang-chow.

It also appears as Chang-chu, Changchew, Chiang-chew, Chiang-Chew, Chiang Chew, Chiochiu, Chanchiu, Changchiu from the city's local Zhangzhou dialect pronunciation of Hokkien Chinese: 漳州; Pe̍h-ōe-jī: Chiang-chiu / Chioⁿ-chiu. This name appeared in Spanish and Portuguese Jesuit sources as Chincheo as well from the Quanzhou dialect pronunciation of Hokkien Chinese: 漳州; Pe̍h-ōe-jī: Cheng-chiu, which was anglicized as Chinchew. By the 19th century, however, Chinchew as a name had migrated and was used to refer to Quanzhou, a separate port about 65 miles (105 km) east-northeast of central Zhangzhou.

== Geography ==
Zhangzhou proper lies on the banks of the Jiulong River in southern Fujian about 35 miles (56 km) from central Xiamen, whose urban core has grown to form a single urbanized area with it. The prefecture of Zhangzhou comprises the southeastern corner of the province, surrounding Xiamen. The prefecture of Quanzhou lies to its northeast, Longyan to its northwest, and Shantou in Guangdong to its southwest.

=== Climate ===
Zhangzhou has a monsoon-influenced humid subtropical climate (Köppen Cfa), with mild to warm winters and long, very hot and humid summers. The monthly 24-hour average temperature ranges from 13.2 °C (55.8 °F) in January to 28.8 °C (83.8 °F) in July, and the annual mean is 21.3 °C (70.3 °F). The frost-free period lasts 330 days.

Climate data for Zhangzhou, elevation 57 m (187 ft), (1991–2020 normals, extremes 1951–2020)
Month	Jan	Feb	Mar	Apr	May	Jun	Jul	Aug	Sep	Oct	Nov	Dec	Year
Record high °C (°F)	30.5 (86.9)	31.6 (88.9)	33.7 (92.7)	36.0 (96.8)	37.9 (100.2)	39.3 (102.7)	40.3 (104.5)	39.0 (102.2)	39.1 (102.4)	37.1 (98.8)	35.2 (95.4)	30.4 (86.7)	40.3 (104.5)
Mean daily maximum °C (°F)	18.7 (65.7)	19.4 (66.9)	21.7 (71.1)	26.0 (78.8)	29.2 (84.6)	31.9 (89.4)	34.3 (93.7)	33.9 (93.0)	32.2 (90.0)	29.0 (84.2)	25.3 (77.5)	20.8 (69.4)	26.9 (80.4)
Daily mean °C (°F)	14.1 (57.4)	14.7 (58.5)	17.0 (62.6)	21.2 (70.2)	24.8 (76.6)	27.6 (81.7)	29.4 (84.9)	28.9 (84.0)	27.6 (81.7)	24.3 (75.7)	20.5 (68.9)	16.0 (60.8)	22.2 (71.9)
Mean daily minimum °C (°F)	11.0 (51.8)	11.8 (53.2)	13.9 (57.0)	18.0 (64.4)	21.8 (71.2)	24.7 (76.5)	26.0 (78.8)	25.6 (78.1)	24.3 (75.7)	20.8 (69.4)	17.0 (62.6)	12.6 (54.7)	19.0 (66.1)
Record low °C (°F)	−2.1 (28.2)	0.4 (32.7)	3.0 (37.4)	6.4 (43.5)	12.3 (54.1)	17.0 (62.6)	21.0 (69.8)	21.3 (70.3)	15.1 (59.2)	7.6 (45.7)	3.8 (38.8)	−0.1 (31.8)	−2.1 (28.2)
Average precipitation mm (inches)	46.3 (1.82)	70.8 (2.79)	106.9 (4.21)	128.3 (5.05)	199.2 (7.84)	270.1 (10.63)	198.5 (7.81)	263.8 (10.39)	175.5 (6.91)	56.0 (2.20)	42.0 (1.65)	46.8 (1.84)	1,604.2 (63.14)
Average precipitation days (≥ 0.1 mm)	7.6	10.1	13.5	13.1	15.8	18.0	11.8	14.9	10.7	4.4	5.2	6.3	131.4
Average relative humidity (%)	72	75	76	76	78	80	75	77	73	67	69	69	74
Mean monthly sunshine hours	130.4	101.5	102.9	118.3	131.4	147.3	219.6	195.6	178.9	182.0	156.9	146.8	1,811.6
Percentage possible sunshine	39	32	28	31	32	36	53	49	49	51	48	45	41
Source 1: China Meteorological Administrationall-time extremes
Source 2: Weather China

== History ==
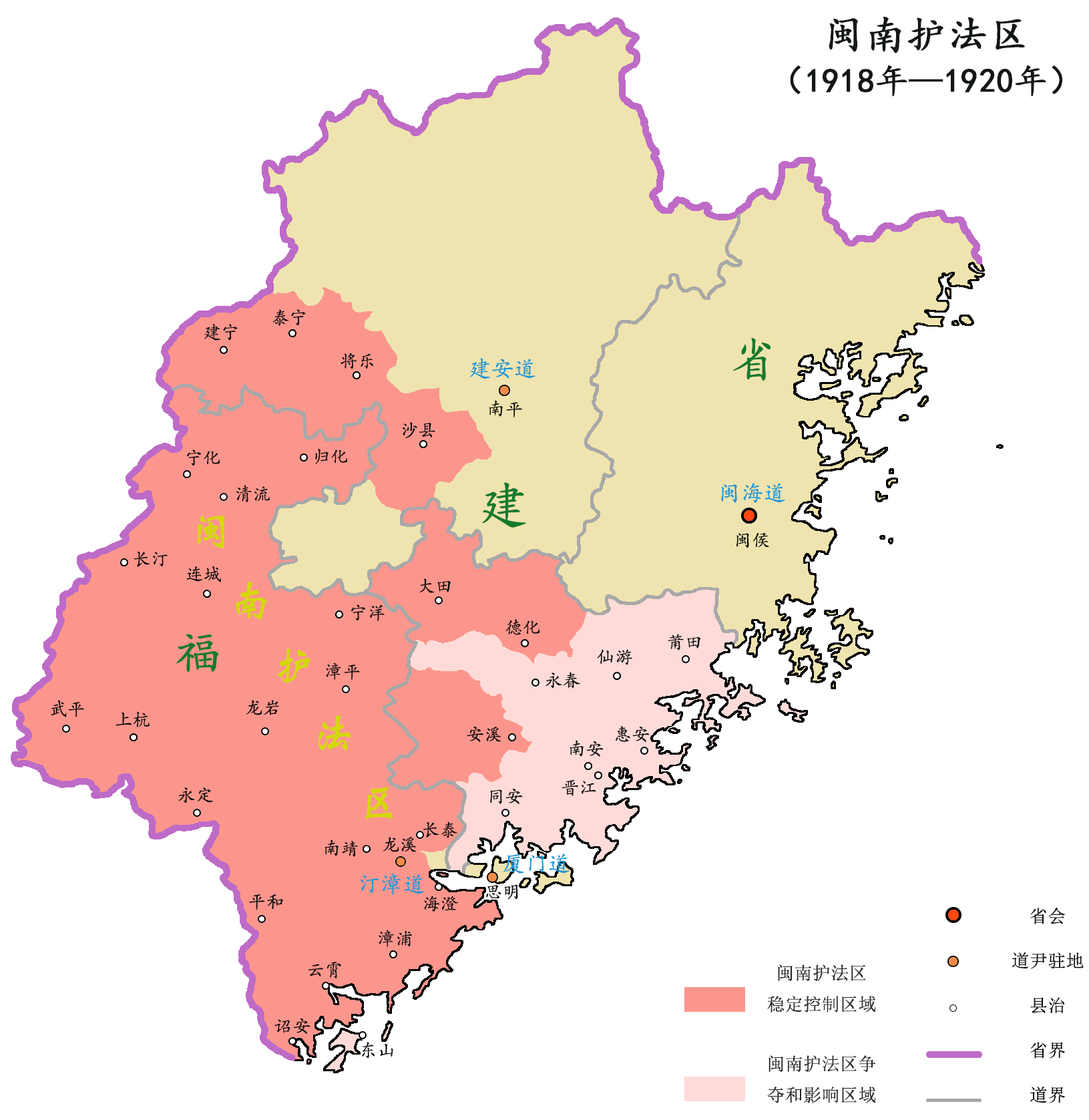
Map of the Constitution Protection Region of Southern Fujian

According to Odoric of Pordenone, Zhangzhou was a prosperous city twice the size of Bologna.

During the early Qing, Zhangzhou was the primary Fujianese port trading with Portuguese Macao and Spanish Manila. For a time, the Portuguese maintained a factory in the city.

During the late Qing, Zhangzhou remained a center of silk, brick, and sugar production with about a million people and extensive internal and maritime trade. Its city wall had a circumference of about 4.5 miles (7.2 km) but included a good deal of open ground and farmland. Its streets were paved with granite but badly maintained. The 800-foot (240 m) bridge across the Jiulong River consisted of wooden planks laid between 25 piles of stones at roughly equal intervals. The port of Xiamen in an island at the mouth of the Jiulong principally functioned as a trading center for the produce and wares of Zhangzhou and its hinterland; both suffered economically when Indian tea plantations cratered demand for Fujianese tea in the late 19th century.

From 1918 to 1920, Chen Jiongming established the anarchist Constitution Protection Region of Southern Fujian with Zhangzhou as its capital.

The old city of Zhangzhou (now Xiangcheng District) was occupied in April and May 1932 by a column of Communist guerrillas under Mao Zedong. Due to the presence of Western gunboats in Xiamen Bay, arms shipments from the Soviet Union were unable to get up the Jiulong River to Mao's forces and the main Communist bases. Discovering this, Mao retreated from the city, according to some accounts with a substantial amount of loot taken from its residents.

== Administrative divisions ==
Zhangzhou comprises 4 urban districts and 7 counties.

1. Xiangcheng District (芗城区)
2. Longwen District (龙文区)
3. Longhai District (龙海区)
4. Changtai District (长泰区)
5. Dongshan County (东山县)
6. Hua'an County (华安县)
7. Nanjing County (南靖县)
8. Pinghe County (平和县)
9. Yunxiao County (云霄县)
10. Zhangpu County (漳浦县)
11. Zhao'an County (诏安县)

Map
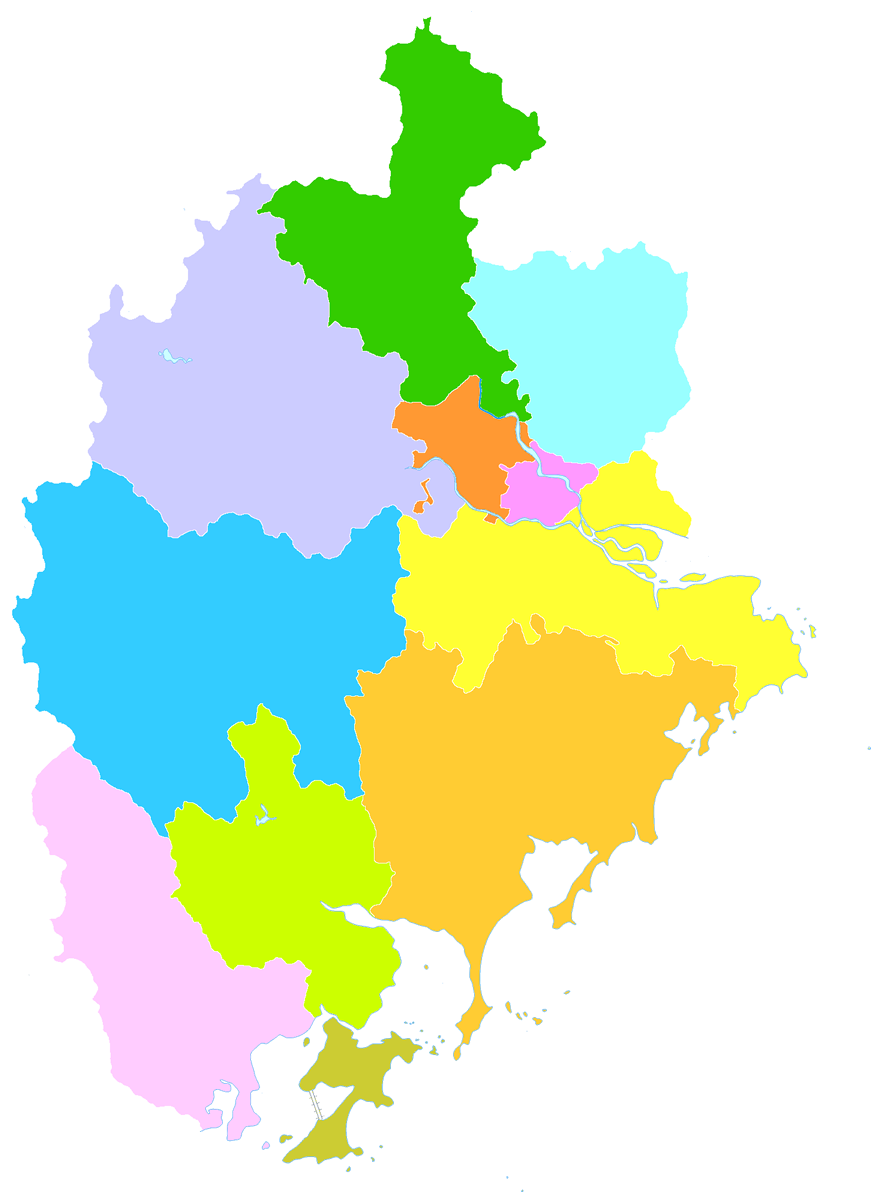

== Demographics ==
During the 2020 Chinese census, the entire area of Zhangzhou was home to 5,054,328 inhabitants. Along with the 2,120,178 people of central Xiamen, its urban districts of Xiangcheng, Longwen, Longhai and Changtai, form a single metropolitan area of about 7,284,148 people.

The main language of the Zhangzhou Hokkiens is the local dialect of Min Nan, part of the Southern Min branch of Min Chinese. Government, education, and official business, however, are carried out in Mandarin.

Hakka is also spoken in the rural peasant area of Zhangzhou in the west and south.

== Economy ==
Babao seal paste was invented by the druggist Wei Changan as a traditional medicine in 1673. It was repurposed for artistic use a few years later and gained imperial favor under the Qianlong Emperor. It remains prized for its bright color and pleasant smell.

A major petrochemical plant, producing paraxylene, owned by Taiwan-based Xianglu Group is located in Zhangzhou's Gulei Peninsula. The plant suffered major fires in 2013 and 2015.

== Transportation ==
Two passenger stations serve Zhangzhou:

- Zhangzhou East Railway Station on the older Yingtan–Xiamen Railway, northeast of the city;
- Zhangzhou Railway Station, the junction of the high-speed Xiamen–Shenzhen Railway and Longyan–Xiamen Railway, opened in 2012, south of the city.

== Education ==
- Minnan Normal University
- Tenfu Tea College
- Zhangzhou College of Science and Technology

== Notable residents ==
- Chen Yuanguang (657–711), a leader of the movement to sinicize Fujian and northern Guangdong.
- Khaw Soo Cheang (1786–1882), merchant and governor of a Thai province.
- Lim Gu Tong (1895–1976), international author, cultural ambassador and inventor.
- Fang Zhouzi (1967), science writer.

== Sister cities ==
Zhangzhou is twinned with the following regions, cities and towns:

- (Indonesia) Palembang, South Sumatra (since 2002)
- (Japan) Isahaya, Nagasaki
- (Japan) Date, Iburi Subprefecture
- Gödöllő, Pest County
- (Netherlands) Wageningen, Gelderland
- (United States) Honolulu, Hawaii

== See also ==
- List of twin towns and sister cities in China
- Yuegang, important seaport during Ming and Ming-Qing transition in modern Zhangzhou and Xiamen
