= Tenfu Tea Museum =

Tea museum in Zhangzhou, China

Coordinates: 24.069398°N 117.510272°E

Tenfu Group
- Type: Private
- Industry: Materials
- Founded: 1993
- Headquarters: Fujian, China
- Products: Consumer goods

Tenfu Tea Museum
- Traditional Chinese: 天福茶博物院
- Simplified Chinese: 天福茶博物院
Transcriptions
Standard Mandarin
- Hanyu Pinyin: Tiānfú chá bówùyuàn
Southern Min
- Hokkien POJ: Thiⁿ-hok tê phok-bu̍t-īⁿ

Tenfu Tea Museum, in Zhangzhou, Fujian, China, was constructed in 2000, and finished in 2012. It is the world's largest tea museum with a total area of 13 acres. The museum consists of many displays of past tea cultures, tea processing, tea and tea ware, as well as having live tea arts culture performances.

== Presentation facilities ==
The museum consists of five parts: Main Exhibition Hall, Chinese Tea Art Classroom, Japanese Tea House, Korean Tea House, Calligraphy and Chinese Painting Hall.

== See also ==
- China National Tea Museum
- History of tea in China
- Ping-Lin Tea Museum
- List of food and beverage museums
