= Tatung Institute of Commerce and Technology =

Private college in Chiayi, Taiwan

Tatung Institute of Technology
- 大同技術學院
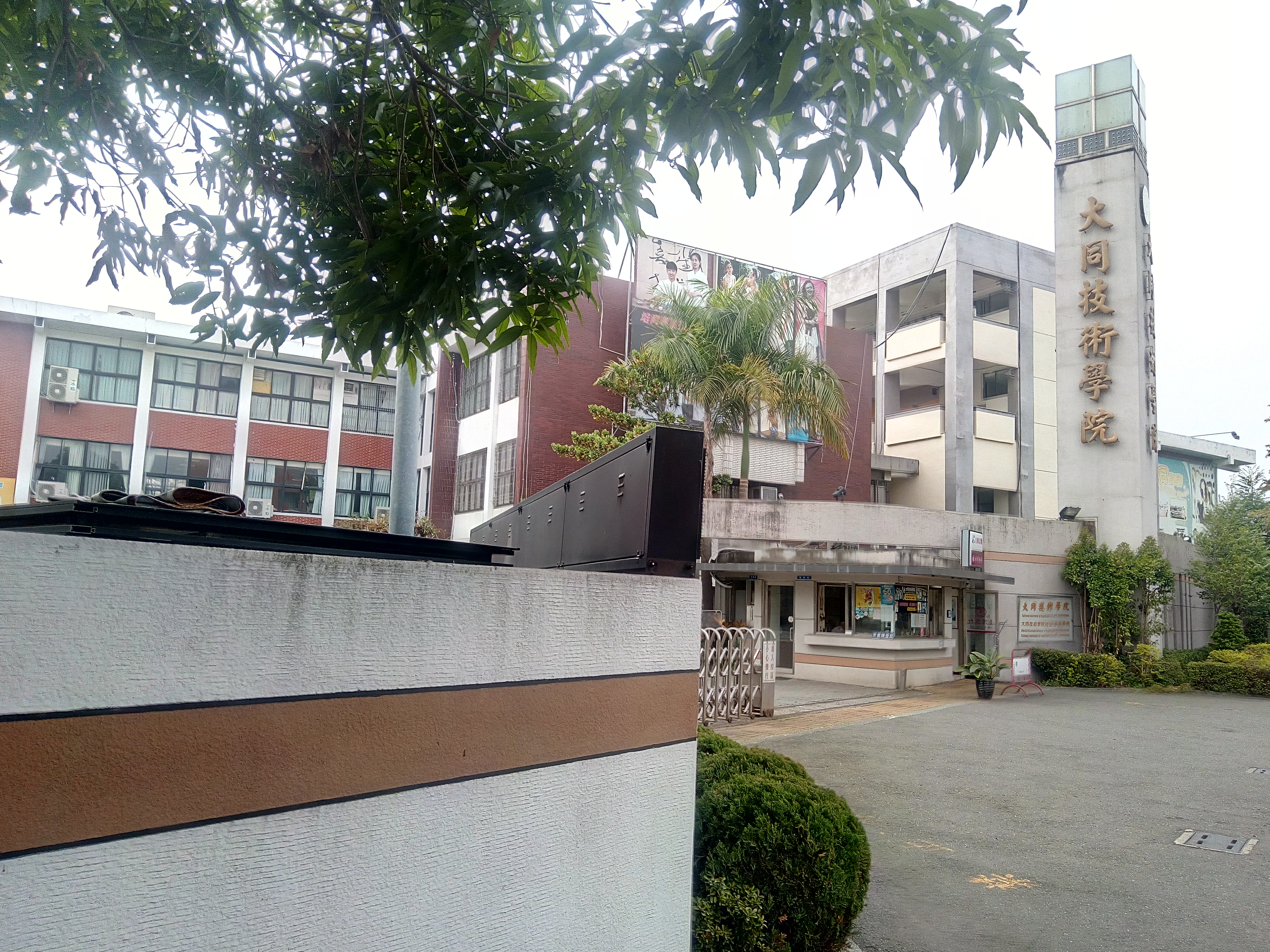
- Other names: TTC
- Active: 1963 (as Tatung Junior College of Commerce); 2003 (as Tatung Institute of Technology)–1 August 2024
- President: Wu Po-hsuan (acting)
- Location: East, Chiayi City, Taiwan; 23.46964°N 120.46438°E
- Website: www.ttc.edu.tw

Tatung Institute of Commerce and Technology
- Traditional Chinese: 大同技術學院
- Simplified Chinese: 大同技术学院
Transcriptions
Standard Mandarin
- Hanyu Pinyin: Dàtóng Jìshù Xuéyuàn
Southern Min
- Hokkien POJ: Tāi-tông Ki-su̍t Ha̍k-īⁿ

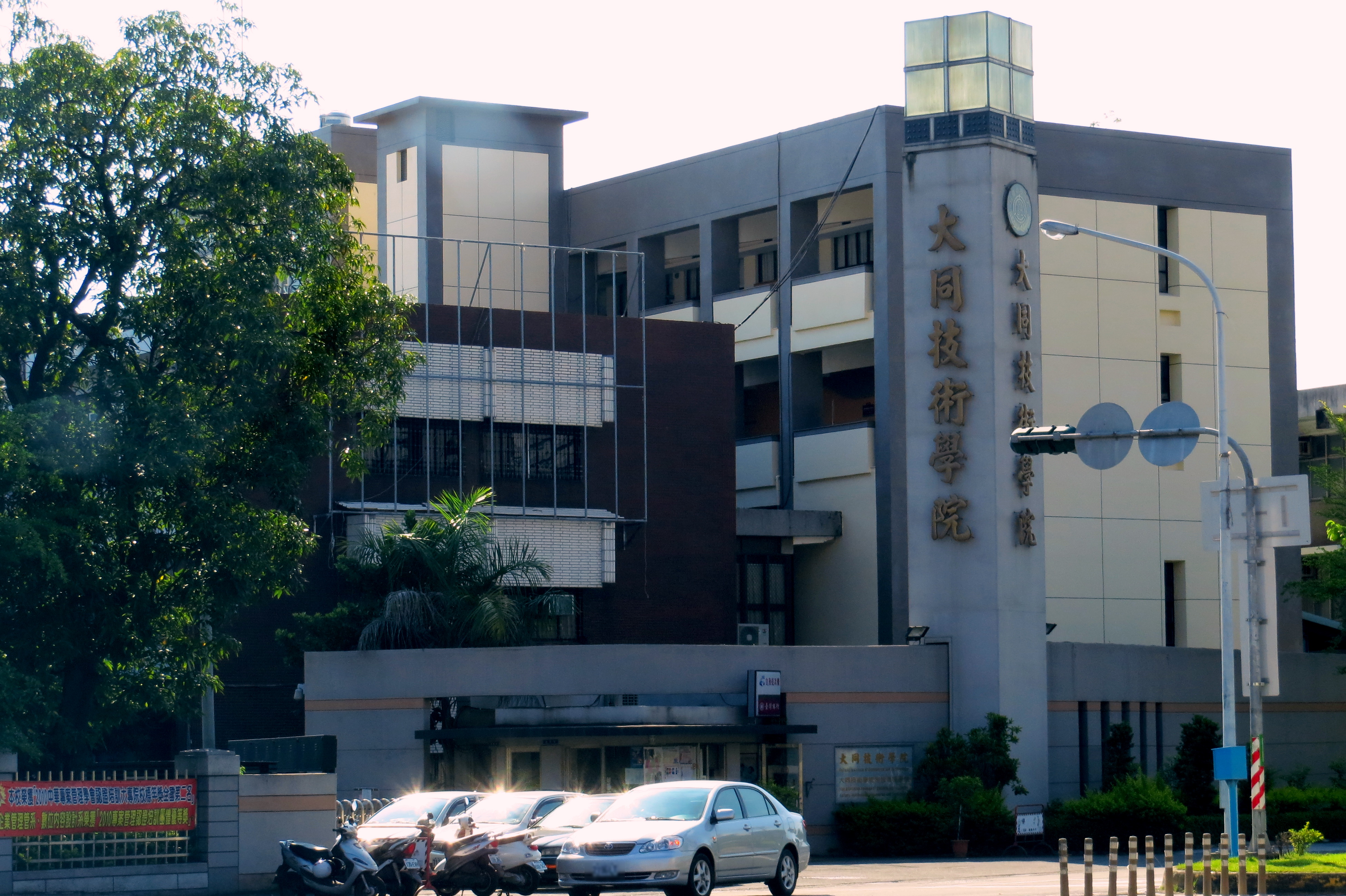
Chiayi Campus, Tatung Institute of Technology

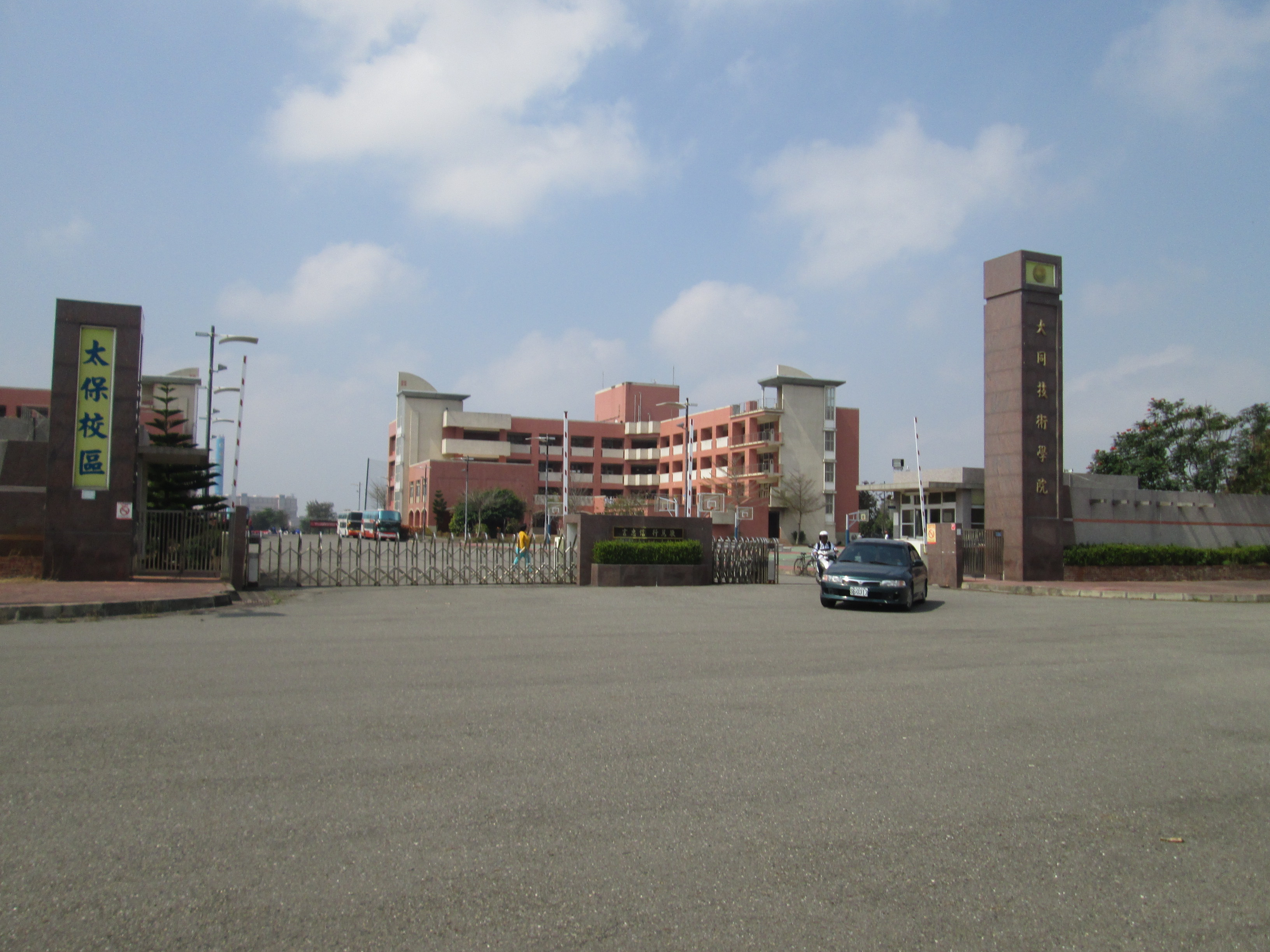
Taibao Campus, Tatung Institute of Technology

Tatung Institute of Technology (TTC; Chinese: 大同技術學院; Pe̍h-ōe-jī: Tāi-tông Ki-su̍t Ha̍k-īⁿ) was an educational institution based in East District, Chiayi City, Taiwan. It had five new departments: Finance, Food and Beverage Management, Early Childhood Care and Education, Multimedia Design, and Leisure Recreation and Tourism Management, with a total of ten academic departments.

== History ==
The school was officially founded as Tatung Junior College of Commerce in 1963 and upgraded as Tatung Institute of Technology in 2003. A two-year Continuing Education Junior College was established in 1999, and four years later another campus was built in Taibau. In 2020, the university had an enrollment rate of less than 60%. On 31 May 2024, Taiwan's Ministry of Education finalized the closure of the Tatung Institute, to take effect in July.

On 1 August 2024, the university stopped its operation.

== Tea Culture and Department of Business Management ==
The Tea Culture and Department of Business Management (茶文化與事業經營學位學程 (系)) has curriculum tailored to specialize in the study of the tea industry like Tea Production and Processing, Market Prospection and Marketing, Tea Culture, and Tourism Management.

The department was founded in 2011. Courses are taught in Chinese with a global perspective and the teaching of English tea terminology. The college provides education in tea science and cultivation, tea arts and culture, tea drinking promotion, as well as preparing people in the field of tea marketing. It is the first college in Taiwan to have specialized curriculum in tea studies.

=== Professional fields of study ===
- Tea production and processing technology
- Marketing and market development
- Tea culture
- Tourism management

== See also ==
- List of universities in Taiwan
