= Shao–Jiang Min =

Min Chinese language of Southern China

Shao–Jiang
- 邵將 / 邵将
- Native to: Southern China
- Region: western Nanping Prefecture, Fujian
- Native speakers: 850,000 (2004)
- Language family: Sino-Tibetan: Sinitic; Chinese; Min; Inland Min; Northern Min; Shao–Jiang
- Early forms: Proto-Sino-Tibetan: Old Chinese (Note: Min is believed to have split from Old Chinese, rather than Middle Chinese like other varieties of Chinese.); Proto-Min
- Dialects: Shaowu; Jiangle
- Writing system: Chinese characters, Romanized Shaowu (Shaowu dialect)

Language codes
- ISO 639-3: sjc
- Glottolog: shao1234
- Linguasphere: > 79-AAA-la 79-AAA-l > 79-AAA-la
- Shao–Jiang Min

Shao–Jiang or Shaojiang Min (simplified Chinese: 邵将; traditional Chinese: 邵將; pinyin: Shàojiāng) is a Min Chinese language centered on Western Nanping in Northwest Fujian, specifically in the Nanping counties of Guangze, Shaowu, and Western Shunchang and the Northern Sanming county of Jiangle.

Shao–Jiang developed from Northern Min (Min Bei), and was deeply influenced by Gan Chinese and Hakka Chinese. The classification of Shao–Jiang is disputed. It is frequently classified as a variety of Northern Min, but sometimes it is excluded from Min and classified as Gan Chinese instead. But it is mutually intelligible with neither other Northern Min nor other Gan. Actually it is a collection of dialects which have limited mutual intelligibility with each other instead of a coherent language. Some Chinese scholars call them Min-Gan varieties (闽赣方言), Min-Gan transitional varieties (闽赣过渡方言) or Min-Hakka-Gan transitional varieties (闽客赣过渡方言).
