= Romanized Shaowu =

Romanization system for the Shaowu dialect of the Shao–Jiang Min language of China

Romanized Shaowu (邵武腔羅馬字 Shiau⁶-u² kʻiong¹ lo⁵-ma² tsʻe⁶) is a romanization system for the Shaowu dialect of the Shao–Jiang Min language.

== History ==
List of Shaowu rimes from the J.E.Walker's syllabary

Christian hymns from the "Alphabet of Romanized Shaowu" by Ada Walker

"Romanized Shaowu" was created in the 1880s by Joseph Elkanah Walker and Ada Walker (née Claghorn), who were American missionaries living in Shaowu since 1872 through the 1930s. In 1891, they have translated the Epistle of James into Shaowu using this romanization (as 《使徒雅各書》 Se³-tʻu⁵ Nga²-ko⁴ shṳ¹).

== System ==
=== Initials ===
p /p/ 比	k /k/ 加	t /t/ 知	ts /ts/ 資	ch /tɕ/ 之
pʻ /pʰ/ 拍	kʻ /kʰ/ 氣	tʻ /tʰ/ 他	tsʻ /tsʰ/ 菜	chʻ /tɕʰ/ 車
m /m/ 米	ng /ŋ/ 牙	n /n/ 儀	s /s/ 西	sh /ɕ/ 時
v /ʋ/ 慰	h /x/ 希	l /l/ 利		
f /f/ 夫				

=== Rimes ===
a /a/ 鴉	ai /ai/ 發	au /au/ 教	an /an/ 爛	ang /aŋ/ 行
ia /ia/ 也		iau /iau/ 腰		iang /iaŋ/ 鏡
ua /ua/ 瓜	uai /uai/ 怪		uan /uan/ 灣	
e /ə/ 而	ei /əi/ 雞	eu /əu/ 後	en /ən/ 恩	
ue /uə/ 國	uei /uei/ 鬼		uen /uən/ 問	
			ṳen /yen/ 勸	
ṳ /y/ 書			ṳn /yn/ 裙	
	éi /ɛi/ 水	éu /ɛu/* 口	én /ɛn/ 能	
ie /ie/ 月			ien /ien/ 延	
o /o/ 惡	oi /oi/ 哀	(ou /ou/ 幼)	on /on/ 安	ong /oŋ/ 方
io /io/ 夜		(iou /iou/ 手)		iong /ioŋ/ 羊
uo /uo/ 果	uoi /uoi/* 殺		uon /uon/ 官	uong /uoŋ/ 光
i /i/ 衣			in /in/ 因	
u /u/ 烏				ung /uŋ/ 翁
iu /iu/* 手				iung /iuŋ/ 用
r /ɯ~ɿ/ 刺				
ng /ŋ/ 五				

There is some variation in the representation of the finals in works by J.E.Walker. E.g., the letter ṳ may be written with the dots above it (as ü).

In modern Shaowu, the palatal sibilants ch /tɕ/, chʻ /tɕʰ/, sh /ɕ/ are only used before /-i-/ and /-y-/. Romanized Shaowu marks the /-i-/ medial somewhat inconsistency, e.g. 上 /ɕioŋ³⁵/ is written as shong⁶ in the Walker's syllabary, but as shiong⁶ in his translation of the Epistle of James. The word 邵 is written shiau⁶ in the syllabary itself, but as shau on its title.

=== Tones ===
Tones in Romanized Shaowu are marked with superscript numbers after the syllable.

Tone name	陰平 en¹-pʻin⁵	上聲 shiong²-chʻin¹	陰去 en¹-kʻṳ³	入聲 nin⁶-chʻin¹	陽平 iong⁵-pʻin⁵	陽去 iong⁵-kʻṳ³
Tone contour	21	55	213	53	22	35
Romanized Shaowu	¹	²	³	⁴	⁵	⁶

== Correspondence to modern Shaowu ==
The original Walker's romanization lacks modern Shaowu finals /ou/ and /iou/, but contains finals iu, uoi, éu, which are absent in modern Shaowu (but may still be preserved in other dialects of Shao-Jiang Min).

The finals eu /əu/, éu /ɛu/, éi /ɛi/ are rearranged in modern Shaowu, with eu /əu/ becoming ou /ou/ (or iou /iou/ after palatal sibilants), éu /ɛu/ becoming eu /əu/, and éi /ɛi/ becoming ei /əi/.

	Walker	Guangze	Shaowu	Jiangle
口	kʻéu²	kʻéu² /khɛu⁴⁴/	kʻeu² /kʰəu⁵⁵/	kʻéu² /kʰeu⁵¹/
樓	léu⁵	léu⁵ /lɛu²²/	leu⁵ /ləu²²/	léu⁵ /leu²²/
搜	séu¹	séu¹ /sɛu²¹/	seu¹ /səu²¹/	shéu¹ /ʃeu⁵⁵/
浮	féu⁵	féu⁵ /fɛu²²/	feu⁵ /fəu²²/	féu⁵ /feu²²/
末	méi⁶	méi⁶ /mɛi⁵⁵/	mei⁶ /məi³⁵/	mo⁴⒝ /mo⁵/
活	féi⁶	féi⁶ /fɛi⁵⁵/	fei⁶ /fəi³⁵/	fo⁴⒝ /fo⁵/
灰	féi¹	féi¹ /fɛi²¹/	fei¹ /fəi²¹/	fuai¹ /fuæ⁵⁵/
雞	kéi¹	kéi¹ /kɛi²¹/	kei¹ /kəi²¹/	ké¹ /ke⁵⁵/
休	heu¹	heu¹ /xəu²¹/	hou¹ /xou²¹/	shiu¹ /ʃiu⁵⁵/
求	kʻeu⁵	kʻeu⁵ /kʰəu²²/	kʻou⁵ /kʰou²²/	kʻiu⁵ /kʰiu²²/
留	leu⁵	leu⁵ /ləu²²/	lou⁵ /lou²²/	liu⁵ /liu²²/
修	seu¹	seu¹ /səu²¹/	sou¹ /sou²¹/	siu¹ /siu⁵⁵/
醜	chʻeu²	chʻiu² /tɕʰiu⁴⁴/	chʻiou² /tɕʰiou⁵⁵/	chʻiu² /tʃʰiu⁵¹/
壽	sheu⁶	shiu⁶ /ɕiu⁵⁵/	shiou⁶ /ɕiou³⁵/	shiu⁶ /ʃiu²³¹/

The final iu /iu/ merges with /iou/ in modern Shaowu.

	Walker	Guangze	Shaowu	Jiangle
手	shiu²	shiu² /ɕiu⁴⁴/	shiou² /ɕiou⁵⁵/	shiu² /ʃiu⁵¹/
周	chiu¹	chiu¹ /tɕiu²¹/	chiou¹ /tɕiou²¹/	chiu¹ /tʃiu⁵⁵/
臭	chʻiu³	chʻiu³ /tɕʰiu³⁵/	chʻiou³ /tɕʰiou²¹³/	chʻiu³ /tʃʰiu³²⁴/
有	iu²	iu²⒝ /iu⁵³/	iou² /iou⁵⁵/	iu² /iu⁵¹/
由	iu⁵	iu⁵ /iu²²/	iou⁵ /iou²²/	iu⁵ /iu²²/

Finals uoi /uoi/, uei /uei/, uon /uon/ lose their medial /-u-/ after labial and dental initials to become /-oi, -ɛi, -on/.

	Walker	Guangze	Shaowu	Jiangle
回	fuei⁵	féi⁵ /fɛi²²/	féi⁵ /fɛi²²/	fi⁵ /fi²²/
雷	luei⁵	léi⁵ /lɛi²²/	léi⁵ /lɛi²²/	lṳ⁵ /ly²²/
水	suei²	shṳ² /ɕy⁴⁴/	séi² /sɛi⁵⁵/	shṳ² /ʃy⁵¹/
殺	suoi⁴	soi⁴ /sɔi⁵³/	soi⁴ /soi⁵³/	sho⁴ /ʃo⁵¹/
衰	suoi¹	soi¹ /sɔi²¹/	soi¹ /soi²¹/	shuai¹ /ʃuæ⁵⁵/
賽	suoi³	soi³ /sɔi³⁵/	soi³ /soi²¹³/	sai³ /sæ³²⁴/
亂	luon⁶	lon⁶ /lɔn⁵⁵/	lon⁶ /lon³⁵/	luén⁶ /luɛ̃²³¹/
滿	muon²	mon²⒝ /mɔn⁵³/	mon² /mon⁵⁵/	muén² /muɛ̃⁵¹/
歡	fuon¹	fon¹ /fɔn²¹/	fon¹ /fon²¹/	fuén¹ /fuɛ̃⁵⁵/

The final r in the Walker's romanization is analyzed as /ɯ/ (or /ɿ/ after sibilants) in modern Shaowu, but it may merge with other finals in some specific contexts.

	Walker	Guangze	Shaowu	Jiangle
刺	tsʻr³	tsʻr³ /tsʰɿ³⁵/	tsʻr³ /tsʰɿ²¹³/	tsʻr³ /tsʰɿ³²⁴/
撕	sr¹	sr¹ /sɿ²¹/	sr¹ /sɿ²¹/	sr¹ /sɿ⁵⁵/
起	kʻr²	kʻi² /kʰi⁴⁴/	kʻr² /kʰɯ⁵⁵/	kʻi² /kʰi⁵¹/
滴	tr⁴	ti⁴ /ti⁵³/	tr⁴ /tɯ⁵³/	ti⁴ /ti²¹/
耳	r²	é²⒝ /ɛ⁵³/	e² /ə⁵⁵/	e² /ø⁵¹/
兒	r⁵	é⁵ /ɛ²²/	e⁵ /ə²²/	e⁵ /ø²²/

Most of the tsʻ /tsʰ/ initials have merged with tʻ /tʰ/ in modern Shaowu, only occasionally being preserved in literary readings.

	Walker	Guangze	Shaowu	Jiangle
罪	tsʻuei⁶	tʻéi⁶ /tʰɛi⁵⁵/	tʻéi⁶ /tʰɛi³⁵/	tsʻui⁶ /tsʰui²³¹/
取	tsʻṳ²	tʻṳ² /tʰy⁴⁴/	tʻṳ² /tʰy⁵⁵/	tsʻṳ² /tsʰy⁵¹/
湊	tsʻéu³	tʻéu³ /tʰɛu⁴⁴/	tʻeu³ /tʰəu²¹³/	tsʻéu³ /tsʰeu³²⁴/
字	tsʻe⁶	tʻé⁶ /tʰɛ⁵⁵/	tʻe⁶ /tʰə³⁵/	sr⁶ /sɿ²³¹/
