= Han Shizhong =

Chinese general (1089–1151)

Han Shizhong 韓世忠
- 韓世忠
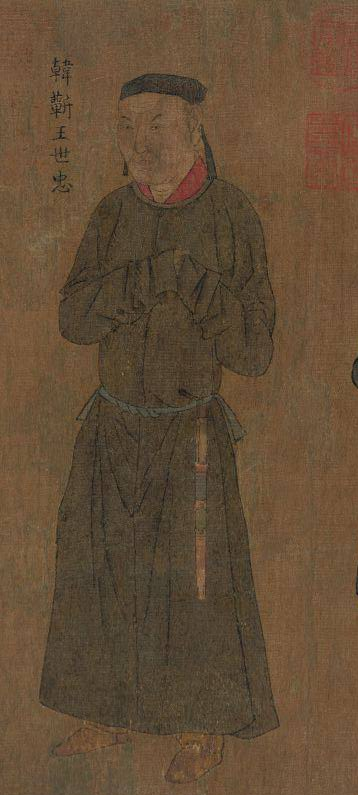
- Born: 1089
- Died: 1151 (aged 61–62)
- Military career
- Allegiance: Song dynasty
- Service years: 1105–1142
- Nickname: Prince of Qi (蘄王)
- Conflicts: Song–Jin wars

Han Shizhong
- Traditional Chinese: 韓世忠
- Simplified Chinese: 韩世忠
Transcriptions
Standard Mandarin
- Hanyu Pinyin: Hán Shìzhōng

Han Shizhong (Chinese: 韓世忠) (1089 – 16 September 1151) was a Chinese military general, poet, and politician of the late Northern Song dynasty and the early Southern Song dynasty. He dedicated his whole life to serving the Song dynasty, and performed many legendary deeds. It is said that he had scars all over his body and, by the time he retired, there were only four fingers left on both of his hands. General Han distinguished himself in the Jin–Song wars against the Jurchen Jin dynasty, and was reputed to win battles in situation where he had to face a larger number of enemies with a smaller numbers of soldiers.

He was also known as a military inventor: his inventions including various modified bows, chain-like armor, a horse jumping obstacle course for cavalry training, and an archery range for archery practice. His wife, Liang Hongyu, was also known to have an exceptional military mind.

Through the tragedy of Yue Fei's execution, Han realized the extent of the rampant corruption throughout the Song imperial court, and retired from military service afterward.

== Early life ==
Han Shizhong was born to a poor farming family in a village of the Shanxi province in the year 1089. He was born in a time when China was under constant threats by stronger bordering nations: notably the Tanguts' Western Xia, the Khitans' Liao dynasty and the Jurchens' Jin Empire. In 1105, the Tanguts' kingdom of Xi Xia attacked China and Han Shizhong was conscripted into military service.

== Early military career ==
In 1105 AD Han Shizhong, responded to the call for military service in his hometown and enlisted in the army of Yan'an Prefecture to resist against Xi Xia invasion. He distinguished himself in this conflict for his courage among the three armies of Song, where he became renowned for his archery skill. At one time, the Song army experienced stalemate at Yinzhou. Han Shizhong personally broke into the city, killed an enemy general defending the city, and threw his head outside the city. The Song army was encouraged and rushed forward to capture the city. Later, Han Shizhong led his elite troops in resisting large numbers of Xi Xia army's counter attack from Haopingling twice. During this battle, he manage to personally kill a Xi Xia's military supervisor's son-in-law, causing the enemy forces to retreat. After the battle, the Jinglüe Si reported Han Shizhong's achievements to the court and requested for his promotion. However, Tong Guan, who was in charge of border affairs at the time , doubted the authenticity of the report and only agreed to promote Han Shizhong promoted to lieutenant. Han Shizhong's colleagues felt dissatisfied with this decision.

Later, Han led Song Jiang's army offensive against the Liao and these stories were written in the Water Margin.

In 1117 AD, Han Shizhong followed Liu Yanqing, a Song local official, to attack the Xi Xia forces, where he climbed the wall of enemy's city on valley at night, killing two enemy soldiers, and allowed paving the way for Song's soldiers to enter the city. In 1118 AD, he followed Liu Yanqing to Tianjiang Mountain to build a garrison city, repelled the Xi Xia raiding parties that came to obstruct his job, and killed many. Subsequently, Zhong Shidao, the chief general of Jingyuan Road, led the seven armies of Shaanxi and Hedong to attack Zangdihe City. Liu Yanqing led the Fuyan soldiers to participate in the battle. Han Shizhong was awarded three ranks in this battle. Later, Han Shizhong was promoted further deputy lieutenant of Yi and deputy lieutenant of Wu in succession for his military exploits.

In 1120, Han was sent as a deputy of General Wang Yuan (王渊) to suppress a local rebellion. It was reputed that he alone infiltrated a rebels' stronghold and captured the leader, Fang La. Han was nicknamed, "Able to defeat ten thousands" (萬人敵) and was rewarded handsomely for his efforts. However, Han's biography in Song Shi went on to indicate that Han was denied credit for capturing Fang La by Xin Xingzong (辛兴宗); Xin took the credit for himself Instead. It was not until Yang Weizhong , the commander-in-chief of the Right Army, returned to the court and reported the matter that Han Shizhong was granted the official rank of sanguan (散官).

Later, a banquet was soon held in Han's honor for this success. During this banquet, Han met his future wife, Liang Hongyu. Liang Hongyu was a courtesan and was serving the officers in the banquet. It is said that Liang caught the eye of Han who was sighing instead of celebrating like the others. Liang approached Han and asked him why he wasn't showing any signs of joy in the banquet which was thrown in his honor. Han replied that this was a small victory and that he was worried about the Jurchens who showed signs of hostility to the Song regime. He stated that it hurt him to imagine the damage that war may bring upon the peasants. Liang was in awe of Han, and the two quickly become very close to each another. Liang decided to follow Han and the two soon were married.

== Military services 1121-1126 ==
=== First Jin invasion ===
In the year 1121, the Song army suffered loss in Yanshan County, Hebei. Following this, Han Shizhong lead a group of over fifty cavalrymen, arrived at the Hutuo River and engaged two thousand Jin cavalrymen. He ordered a junior captain named Su Ge to lead a small force to seize the high ground, forming a battle array there and observing without moving. He also organized the Song troops which previously fleeing Yanshan, numbering several hundred, and had them form a formation, while Han Shizhong beating drums. Then, he led several death-defying knights and charged directly into the Jin army, attacking and killing the Jin flag bearer. Su Ge led the cavalrymen occupying the high ground and charging down from above. The Song soldiers on the riverbank also beat drums and shouted. Miraculously, Miraculously, Han emerged victorious over the Jin.

=== Rebels suppression ===
In 1125, Han Shizhong followed Wang Yuan to hunt down bandits, annihilated the pirates in Damingfu, and defeated the robbers in Tangcun. He made great achievements and was awarded the title of Bingyilang. Later, as a lieutenant general, he followed Liang Fangping, the governor of Shandong, to attack Shandong. He defeated the thousands of troops of Yang Tianwang and Toushouhua in Weishi, defeated the tens of thousands of Wuhu rebels in Linyi at Hanwangdian, and participated in defeating Xu Jin of Yizhou, Zhang Xian of Qingshe, Liu Dalang of Shuigu, Gao Tuoshan of Wangxian, Jia Jin of Jilu, Xu Dalang of Juxian, Zhang Kui of Donghai. Han Shizhong was awarded the title of Wujielang for his meritorious service in those operations.

In April, Han Shizhong's general Yang Jin repelled the Jin army that had invaded Nanjing, Yingtian Prefecture (present-day Shangqiu, Henan). Han Shizhong accompanied Zhao Gou to Nanjing. Prince Zhao Gou ascended the throne in Nanjing as Emperor Gaozong of Song. Upon his ascension, Emperor Gaozong appointed Han Shizhong as the Inspector General of Gwangju, with the imperial weapons in his care . Han Shizhong had previously requested to move the capital to Chang'an and send troops to retake the two He regions, but his request was rejected. When the imperial camp was rebuilt, he was appointed Commander of the Left Army. Subsequently, Han Shizhong was tasked with independently recapture Yutai, defeat the Shanzhou rebels, and assist Liu Guangshi in defeating the rebels at Liyi.

=== Second Jin invasion ===
Later in the same year, the Jin army destroyed the Liao Empire and swiftly destroyed the forces of Xi Xia and Goryeo (both allies of Liao), making them vassal states of the Jin Empire. That very same year, the Jurchens assembled a large coalition force consisting of Jurchens, Tanguts, Khitans and Koreans to launch a second invasion of China. Han was defending the city of Zhaozhou once again under General Wang Yuan (Chinese:王淵). After a few months of battle, the city's logistical supplies dwindled. Han asked for three hundred cavalrymen and, one night, made a surprise attack on the enemy encampment. This attack caught the Jurchens by surprise and they began to scramble and swing their swords on anyone they saw. By daybreak, many of them had trampled over one another; amongst those fatalities was the commander of the invading Jurchen force. The Jurchens had no choice but to retreat. Thus was the city of Zhaozhou relieved. Despite this victory, most other Song defending forces, again, were defeated, and the Jurchens even captured two Song emperors in the Jingkang incident.

In the first month of 1126, Han Shizhong accompanied Liang Fangping in defending the Yellow River Bridge in Rongzhou (present-day Junxian County, Henan Province) against the Jin army. Liang Fangping fled, and Han Shizhong fought bravely to break through, burning the bridge before retreating to Kaifeng. When the Jin army besieged Kaifeng, Han Shizhong was promoted to commander and participated in the defense. In February, the Jin army withdrew, and Han Shizhong was appointed vanguard commander under Wang Yuan, the governor of Hebei Province. In June, Li Gang , the envoy of Hedong and Hebei, came to support Taiyuan. At the time, Han Shizhong was stationed in Daming. He was ordered by Li Gang (also known as Li Mida, the deputy envoy of the envoy), to suppress the rebels. For his meritorious service, he was promoted to commander of the Shanzhou militia and stationed at the Hutuo River. At the time, Wang Yuan was defending Zhaozhou (present-day Zhaoxian County, Hebei Province). Han Shizhong went to assist Wang Yuan, but was forced into the city by tens of thousands of Jin troops. The enemy forces surrounded the city several times, leaving the soldiers few and short of food, and the army's morale was unstable. Some advocated abandoning the city, but Han Shizhong refused. That night, heavy snow fell. He selected 300 strong soldiers and stormed the Jin army camp outside the city, causing the Jin army to lose their will to fight and retreat. After the battle, he was promoted to the rank of Defense Envoy for his merits. After Han Shizhong led his troops back to Daming, he was appointed as the Commander of the Front Army by General Zhao Ye.

== Service under Emperor Gaozong ==
In AD 1127, Han was given a thousand-man army to escort the crown prince Zhao Gou, Prince of Kang (趙構, 亦称康王) to safety in southern China. He faced an enemy army ten times larger than hisnown forces. However, Han Shizhong army emerged victorious and forced the enemy to retreat. The crown prince who would become Emperor Gaozong (宋高宗) successfully reached Henan (河南商丘), ascended the throne and established the Southern Song dynasty. Shortly after in 1127 or 1128, the capital was moved to Yangzhou.

Han advised Emperor Gaozong to recover the lost lands in the North, but Gaozong, content with simply being emperor, neglected his advice. Meanwhile, while under siege, Zong Ze (宗泽), the Chinese general guarding the northern capital, Kaifeng (開封), was so angered that he felt ill knowing no reinforcements would be sent, and died shortly after, on 1 August 1128. The city surrendered shortly after.

Later in the year 1128, due to the fall of Kaifeng, many of the Song generals, disgusted by the cowardly emperor, began to mutiny. Han Shizhong was promoted to the rank of Commander of the Dingguo Army and led his subordinates to follow Emperor Gaozong in his escape to Yangzhou. Zhang Yu, who had surrendered to the court at that time, arrived at the city gates, still wearing his armor, and the people of Yangzhou were in a panic. Han Shizhong went to Zhang Yu's tent alone to calm his troops. Li Min's 100,000 troops surrendered, but there were signs of rebellion on the way. Han Shizhong was ordered to announce the imperial edict, execute Liu Yan, who had rebellious intentions, expel Li Min, and hand over 29 of his officers to his superior Wang Yuan for execution. After handling this matter, Han Shizhong was awarded title. In March, two other mutinous Song generals Miao Fu and Liu Zhengyan killed Wang Yuan and the eunuch Kang Lu , and forcing Emperor Gaozong to abdicate in favor of his three-year-old son, Zhao Bing. Lü Yihao, the governor of Jiangnan East Road and the governor of Jiangning Prefecture, contacted Zhang Jun, the military advisor of the Imperial Camp, and other generals such as Han Shizhong to quell the rebellion and rescue Emperor Gaozong. Han Shizhong had few soldiers around him, so he gathered scattered soldiers in the Yancheng area, organized a force of dozens of people, and came to Changshu from the sea. He met with Zhang Jun and others and marched to Xiuzhou, then pretended to suspend the war and stopped advancing, while he was prepared sudden attack the city. Miao Fu and Liu Zhengyan knew that Han Shizhong was coming to attack, so they captured Han Shizhong's wife Liang Hongyu as a hostage. Prime Minister Zhu Shengfei pretended to submit to Miao and Liu, saying that instead of forcing Han Shizhong to fight, it would be better to send Liang Hongyu to persuade Han Shizhong to surrender. Miao and Liu indeed sent an envoy to accompany Liang Hongyu to meet Han Shizhong. Liang returned to her husband. After the envoy arrived, Han Shizhong burned the imperial edict, beheaded the envoy, and ordered an attack on Hangzhou. Han Shizhong defeated the rebel defense force at the north gate of Hangzhou. Miao and Liu were frightened and fled with 2,000 elite soldiers.

Han Shizhong rescued Emperor Gaozong, who warned that Wu Zhan, commander of the palace's central army, was conspiring with Miao Fu and Liu Zhengyan. As Wu approached to clasp hands, Han Shizhong ordered his capture, and had him executed in the city. Han also seized Wang Shixiu, the rebellion's chief instigator.

For these feats, Han was appointed governor of the Wusheng Army and the imperial camp's Left Army. He then volunteered to pursue the fugitives Miao and Liu, earning the governorship of Jiangsu and Zhejiang. His forces captured Liu Zhengyan and Miao Fu's brother Miao Yi; Miao Fu surrendered en route. With the Miao-Liu Rebellion quelled, Emperor Gaozong inscribed the words "loyalty and courage" as a gift to Han and elevated him to inspector of the imperial guards and governor of the Wusheng and Zhaoqing armies.

=== Third Jin invasion ===
In the year 1129, Emperor Gaozong summoned his generals to discuss an escape route in order to avoid the Jin army's offensive. Zhang Jun and Xin Qizong requested to move to Hunan. Han Shizhong disagreed as he reasoned that the Huaihe and Zhejiang areas were a rich and fundamental place. Now that people were in a panic, if they fled, it would be difficult to ensure that there would be no accidents on the way to Hunan. Furthermore, the Emperor he would need to leave troops to guard the Yangtze and Huaihe Rivers. If half of the 100,000 troops were to guard the Yangtze and Huaihe Rivers, the remaining 50,000 would also be difficult to protect. Later, Han Shizhong collected thousands of defeated soldiers in Yangcheng. After hearing that Emperor Gaozong had fled south to Qiantang, he immediately went to the temporary residence (referring to Qiantang) by sea.

Despite early successes of the Jurchens, the Jurchens was beaten off by another general, Yue Fei, in a series of battles. The Jurchens under a crowned prince Jin Wuzhu (金兀朮), with a large force of hundred thousand force, decided to avoid Yue and took a route to cross and invade the capital and abduct another emperor. Han along with his wife hurried to take command of it. In his journey, he stayed in a local temple where he came face to face with a few Jin Generals and over a hundred Jurchen warriors. Despite the fact that Han only had a few guards and his wife along with him, they managed to fend the enemy off and took the heads of some Jin Generals. The group arrived shortly at the mouth of the river.

==== The Battle of Huangtiandang ====
In March 1130, Wuzhu's army arrived in Zhenjiang. They were blocked by Han Shizhong's troops. The navy led by Han Shizhong had huge and lofty warships which were guarding the estuary, preventing Jin troops from crossing. Jin troops had less and smaller battleships and were not good at battles on water, though they outnumbered their enemies. At the beginning, Jin troops suffered great losses, and Wuzhu still could not cross the river after a stalemate for 48 days. His troops had to penetrate up the river to Jiankang. In the battle that soon took place, known as the Battle of Huangtiandang (黃天蕩), the troops dug a 15-kilometre canal along the old water channel of the Laoguan River (老鹳河) overnight, which led to the Qinhuai River and finally enabled them to escape back to Jiankang. Since Han Shizhong pursued to Jiankang and blockaded the river with warships, Wuzhu posted a reward for the scheme to destroy the warships to cross the river. A man from Fujian Province gave him a suggestion of shooting flaming arrows into the sails of the warships, which could not move without wind. Wuzhu followed his advice and made flaming arrows that very night. On a still sunny day, Wuzhu carried out the scheme and succeeded. Countless Song soldiers were burnt to death or drowned in the river. Han Shizhong had to abandon his ship and escape back to Zhenjiang with only dozens of his men.

As Han retreated, he gave the false impression that his soldiers had to retreat to a temple up a mountain, which the Jurchens thought of as a time when they could easily captured him. However, it was a trap that Han deployed for them. As the Jurchen commander Jin Wuzhu (金兀术) entered the temple, he was surrounded by a few well trained riders, and he and men in his group were completely cut off from the others by Chinese troops hiding in the road up the mountain. This led to a popular saying of the time, " a hundred thousand lured to a trap, and it takes only eight thousand riders to cut them off." (十萬敵兵來假道，八千驍騎截中流).

The Jin navy on the river was checked by a new invention of the Chinese, the tiger ship, which could spill fire from its front using flamethrowing technology imported from the Middle East by way of Arab mariners. They attacked after hearing the signal of Liang Hongyu who beat the wardrums in a hill nearby (梁红玉鳴鼓退金兵). The tiger ships quickly pierced the Jin ships, and the Jin navy was close to being routed by their enemies. The Jurchens were trapped for forty days wherein almost half their force was routed; and, the Jin prince who commanded the Jurchen army even sent messengers to the Chinese commander and offered bribes to beg for mercy. Han ignored the request. Eventually the Jurchens escaped through a hole in Han's encirclement due to the lack of soldiers—the weakness was revealed by a Song traitor. Even so, the Jurchens was checked by General Yue Fei and almost entirely routed before they get back to Jin territory. The third invasion was again a military disaster for the Jurchens.

=== Suppressing peasant rebellion ===
Later in 1131, Han Shizhong also helped the Song court to suppress the peasant rebellions led by Fan Ruwei from Jian'an. Fan Ruwei raised an army again and occupied Jianzhou City with a force of more than 100,000 people. He then divided his troops to attack the Song army at Shaowu, Guangze County, Nanjian county and other places. Han Shizhong decided to sail from Taizhou (present-day Linhai, Zhejiang) to Fuzhou first, then march north to capture Jianzhou. Han Shizhong, leading the way, forded the rapids on horseback across Jiantan, and his troops then crossed and advanced together. The main roads leading to Jianzhou were blocked and destroyed by the peasant army. Han Shizhong then led his troops along narrow mountain paths, quickly circling Fenghuang Mountain northeast of Jianzhou. Later, Han Shizhong's soldiers suddenly surrounded Jianzhou City. After six days of siege, the city was broken. Fan Ruwei fled back to Siyuan Cave and commit suicide.

=== Defense of Chuzhou ===
In the year of 1134, Han Shizhong was appointed as the envoy of Jiankang, Zhenjiang and Huaidong, and was stationed in Zhenjiang. At this time, after Yue Fei recovered Xiangyang (now Xiangyang , Hubei) and other six counties, the pseudo-Qi emperor Liu Yu sent people to ask for help from the Jin Kingdom. Jin Taizong Wanyan Sheng ordered Wanyan Zongbi to lead an army of 50,000 to join forces with the Qi army. On the 12th, as Wei Liangchen passed through Yangzhou, Han feigned orders to evade the enemy and withdraw to Zhenjiang. Once Wei departed, Han rushed elite cavalry to Dayi Town, splitting them into five formations with over 20 ambushes in nearby swamps.The next day, misled by Wei's report, Jin general Nie Er Bojin dispatched General Ta Boye and several hundred cavalry to the Yangzhou river mouth, east of Dayi. Han personally led light cavalry to lure them in. Song forces ambushed from all sides, trapping the Jin in quagmire where they couldn't wield bows or swords. Han's elite cavalry encircled them, while the Beiwei troops used long axes to hack soldiers' chests and sever horses' legs. Over 200 Jin officers, including Ta Boye, were captured; the rest were annihilated. Upon news of the victory reaching Lin'an, numerous officials offered congratulations. Censor-in-Chief Shen Yuqiu remarked, "Since the Jianyan era, Song generals and troops had not engaged the Jin forces. Shizhong's successive victories have now eroded their superiority—a substantial achievement." Emperor Gaozong commended Han Shizhong and decreed rewards for him and his generals commensurate with their merits. The Battle of Dayi Town ranked among the Southern Song's renowned "Thirteen Military Achievements.". After the battle, Wanyan Chang and Wanyan Zongbing, who were stationed in Sizhou and Zhuju Town respectively , were trapped by Han Shizhong and had no choice but to ask him for a fight. Han Shizhong agreed and sent two actors to deliver oranges and tea as a gift . Coincidentally, it was raining and snowing, and the Jin army's food supply was cut off. Morale was low, and Jin Taizong was seriously ill. There were internal changes in the Jin Dynasty. The Jin-Qi army retreated one after another.

In the year of 1135, Han Shizhong was promoted to the position of Shaobao. The following year, he was appointed Jiedushi of Wuning and Anhua, and Xuanfushi of Jingdong and Huaidong, and was given an office in Chuzhou. During his tenure in Chuzhou, Han Shizhong strengthen the discipline of the army. he shares the hardships with his soldiers; his wife Liang Hongyu also wove thin cloth to build a house. If any soldier was afraid of fighting, Han Shizhong would give him women's clothing and make him put on women's makeup at a banquet to shame him and boost the army's morale. After that, he recruited displaced people, and focusing on Chuzhou commercial development. During this time, Qi state repeatedly sent troops to invade many times, but they were all defeated by Han Shizhong.

At the time, Right Prime Minister Zhang Jun led his army north, commanding his generals to launch an offensive against Jin and Qi. Han Shizhong was ordered to seize Huaiyang from Chengzhou and Chuzhou. Liu Yu of the Qi state was gathering his forces in Huaiyang. Han Shizhong immediately led his troops across the Huai River, advancing north along Fuli, and directly to the city walls of Huaiyang. During the battle, he was surrounded by enemy forces, but leaping with his spear, he managed to break through the siege, remaining unscathed. His subordinate, Huyan Tong, single-handedly challenged Jin general Yahe Bojin and captured him alive. Seizing the opportunity, the Song army launched a surprise attack, repelling the Jin forces. Han Shizhong then laid siege to Huaiyang for six days, but failed to capture it. Wanyan Zongbi and Liu Ni of the Qi state arrived to reinforce the city. Han Shizhong was outnumbered and unable to seek help from Zhang Jun, so he formed a battle formation to survice the potemtial two-pronged attack from the enemy and sent someone to tell them: "The one standing in front of the battle array, dressed in brocade and riding a horse l, is none other than Han Xianggong(Shizhomg).". His subordinates were worried about his safety, and Han Shizhong said: "If we don't do this, we cannot defeat the enemy." The Jin-Qi coalition forces fell into his trap and came. Han Shizhong sent troops to challenge them, personally killing two enemy generals and driving the Jin army back. After that, he received the imperial edict and returned to Chuzhou, bringing back tens of thousands of Huaiyang people who had voluntarily followed him back home.

=== Fourth Jin invasion ===
The Jurchens again assembled another force in 1137, consisting of seventy thousand men and began the fourth invasion. Losing many experienced soldiers through the previous invasions, the Jurchens this time had poorer results and after a few battles were almost completely routed. The Chinese force under Yue Fei and Han Shizhong quickly took advantage of the situation and began a counterattack.

In 1139, after the victorious Battle of Yancheng, Yue Fei left for the Imperial court where he presented a memorial to the emperor praising Han Shizhong's service, "On the 8th day of this month whilst out scouting, I saw four evil foreign princes, their mighty warriors and Wanyan Zongxian (完顏宗賢). General Han Shizhong led 15,000 of our troops on horseback all dressed in shining armor. They seized the road 20 li (6.6 miles) to the north of Yancheng where our cavalry engaged the enemy in the early evening when officers and men hacked and chopped at the foes with maza swords (麻扎刀), griffes (提刀) and large hatchets. In ten bitter battles, countless enemies were slaughtered, their bodies littering the ground. As twilight fell we withdrew, stealing two hundred horses as we went. I would like to report a great victory and now await further orders from your majesty.

In the year of 1140, the Jin Dynasty break truce and launched a large-scale invasion to the south, attacking the three capitals (Kaifeng Prefecture, Nanjing Yingtian Prefecture, and Henan Prefecture, Xijing) that had just been taken over by the Song army. In August, Han Shizhong led his army to besiege Huaiyang, which was occupied by the Jin army, and defeated the reinforcements of the Jin army at the town of Jikou. He also sent his generals Jie Yuan and Liu Bao to win in Tancheng and Qianqiu Lake respectively. After the war, Han Shizhong was appointed as the Grand Tutor for his merits and was also the envoy of the Henan and Hebei provinces, and was granted the title of Duke of Ying.

== Retirement and death ==
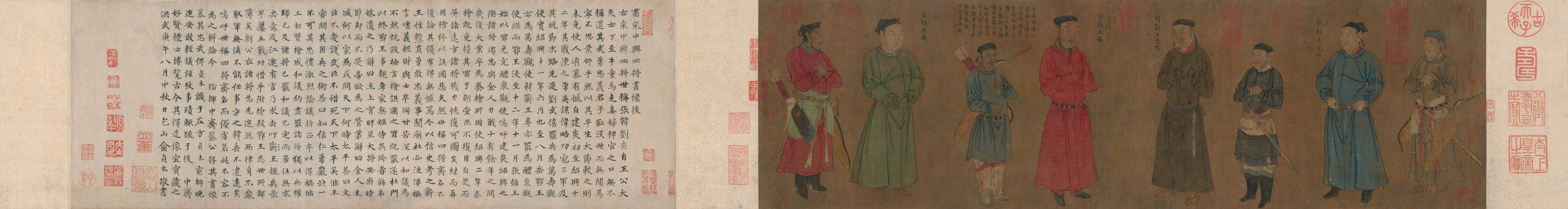
The "Four Generals of the Restoration" painted by Liu Songnian during the Southern Song dynasty. Han is the fifth person from the left. Yue Fei is the second person from the left. Zhang Jun is fourth from the left.

The night before they entered the Jin Capital, the emperor of China was worried about saving the two previous emperors in the Jin Capital and ordered the generals to come back. The generals avoided the idea at first, but the emperor began to send more letters and even threatened killing the soldiers' families. Yue Fei in tears stated, "Thirty years of effort are now wasted." The generals were ordered back to the imperial court, and this time met with chancellor Qin Hui and many of the officials and generals who supported the peace policy of the court. They imprisoned General Yue Fei and were about to sentence him when Han Shizhong asked Qin Hui, "Upon what charges?". Qin Hui simply stated, "For Yue's guilt, No evidence needed? (其事体莫須有)" (it has become a famous proverb for 'trumped-up charge' in Chinese language). Han then replied, "How can you satisfy people's demand for justice with a logical fallacy such as 'No evidence needed?'" Later, Han was so outraged than he laughed and threw his helmet and sword, which were both symbols of the authority of a Chinese general, at him. He attacked the emperor and Qin Hui with these insulting words: "They brought their nations into ruins, and there will no longer be any more able generals that will fight for the Song." Originally Qin wanted to kill Han next, but Han saved the emperor in a past battle, so Han was allowed to live.

In 1142, when Empress Dowager Wei (Empress Xianren), the biological mother of Emperor Gaozong of Song, returned to the Southern Song Dynasty from the Jin Dynasty. Han Shizhong accompanied Emperor Gaozong to pay homage to Empress Dowager Wei in Linping Town. The Empress Dowager said she has heard of Han Shizhong's reputation when she was still held in the Jin Dynasty.

He soon retired from military service and when General Yue was executed, he neglected an imperial edict to arrest Yue's family, and instead escorted the Yue family to safety. He and his family retreated into the rural areas and he died in 1151.

People often saw Han riding a donkey along the West Lake, taking a bottle of wine, and sitting and sprinkling a bit of it upon Yue's grave. He would speak to Yue in a soft and emotional way, regardless of the weather; rain or snow.

== Assessments ==
In the History of Song book, Han Shizhong was praised as wàn rén dí (萬人敵 lit. A warrior equal to 10,000 men.).

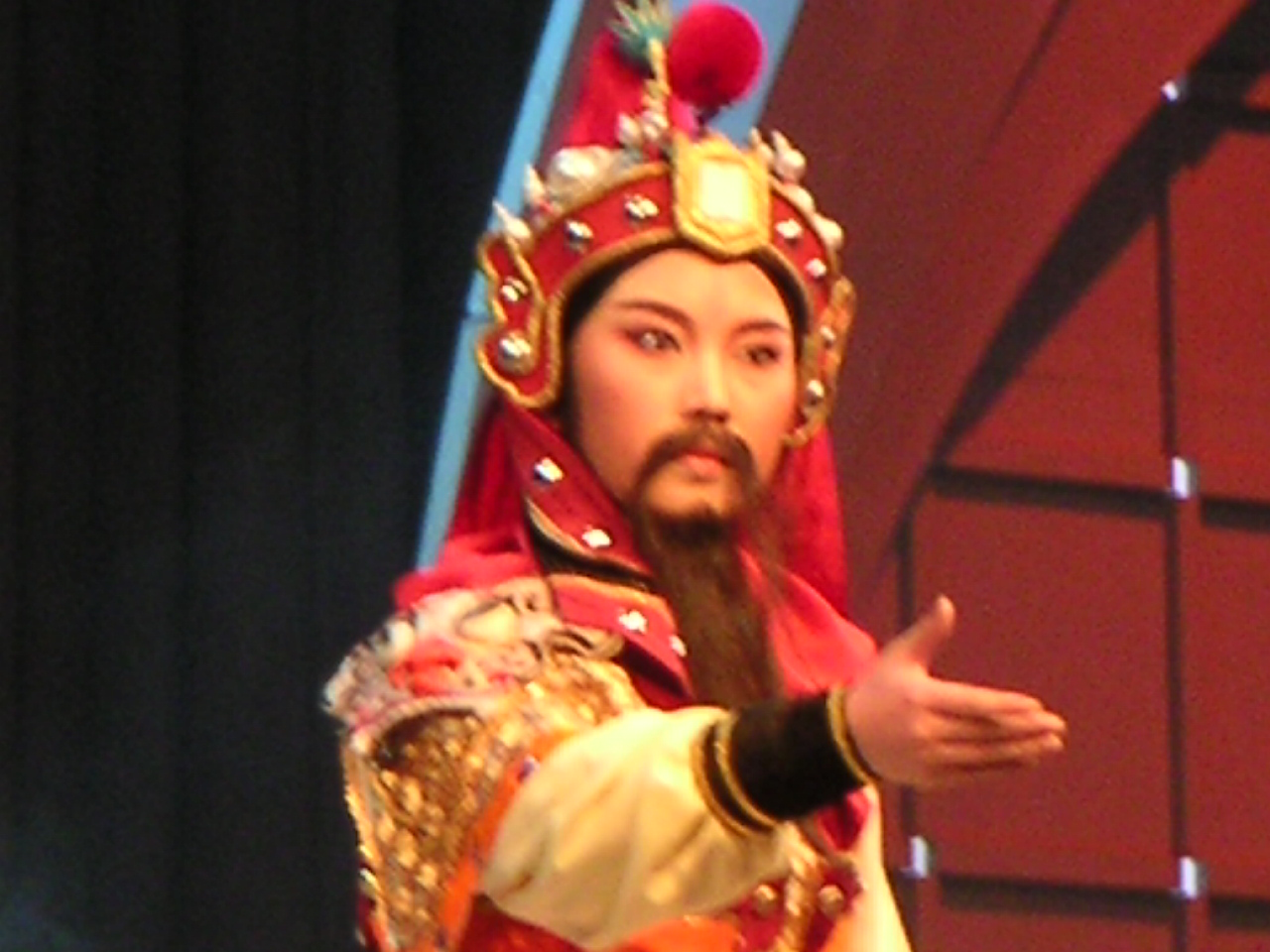
Yue opera actress playing as Han Shizhong

During the reign of Emperor Xiaozong of Song, Yuwen Jia, the Minister of Rites, and others praised Han Shizhong, saying: "He fought in hundreds of battles and was a man of righteousness and courage. He served the emperor in the Jianyan era and fought bravely. He led the Huai and Chu armies with his fierce determination and his reputation spread throughout the Qiang and Yi peoples".

Yang Wanli, a famous official, said: “Famous ministers of the past such as Zhao Ding and Zhang Jun, and famous generals such as Yue Fei and Han Shizhong, were feared by the Jin people.”.

Han Shizhong was credited with many military inventions including various modified armor and bows, horse jumping obstacles that trained cavalry, and an archery range to train the accuracy of archers and mounted archers.

His military career enabled China to survive the Jurchen invasion and, along with Yue Fei, helped to crumple the powerful Jin military. It is because of these events which led to the decline of the militaristic Jin, and the rise of Genghis Khan and the Mongols.

== See also ==
- Zhou Tong (archer)
- Yue Fei
- Zhang Jun (general)

== Sources ==
- History of Song, volume 364
- Mote, Frederick W. (1999). Imperial China: 900–1800. Harvard University Press. ISBN 0-674-44515-5.
- Tao, Jing-Shen (2009). "The Move to the South and the Reign of Kao-tsung". In Paul Jakov Smith; Denis C. Twitchett (eds.). The Cambridge History of China: Volume 5, The Sung Dynasty and Its Precursors, 907-1279. Cambridge University Press. pp. 556–643. ISBN 978-0-521-81248-1.
