= Jiangle dialect =

Shao-Jiang Min Chinese dialect

Jiangle
- Native to: Southern China
- Region: Jiangle, Sanming, Fujian
- Language family: Sino-Tibetan: Sinitic; Chinese; Min; Inland Min; Northern Min; Shao–Jiang Min; Jiangle
- Early forms: Proto-Sino-Tibetan: Old Chinese (Note: Min is believed to have split from Old Chinese, rather than Middle Chinese like other varieties of Chinese.); Proto-Min

Language codes
- ISO 639-3: –
- Glottolog: jian1242
- Linguasphere: 79-AAA-lac

The Jiangle dialect is a dialect of Shao-Jiang Min Chinese spoken in Jiangle, Sanming in northwestern Fujian province, China. It combines elements from Northern Min and Hakka Chinese.

== Phonology ==
The Jiangle dialect has 19 initials, 36 rimes and 7 tones.

=== Initials ===
p, pʰ, m, f, v, t, tʰ, l, ts, tsʰ, s, tʃ, tʃʰ, ʃ, k, kʰ, ŋ, x, ʔ

=== Rimes ===
ɿ, i, u, y, a, ia, ua, o, yo, e, ie, ue, ø, yø, æ, uæ, eu, iu, ui, au, iau, aŋ, iaŋ, uaŋ, ɔŋ, iɔŋ, ɤŋ, iɤŋ, ɛ̃, iɛ̃, uɛ̃, yø̃, ĩ, uĩ, ỹ, ŋ̍

=== Tones ===
No.	1	2	3	4	5	6	7
Tone name	dark level 陰平	light level 陽平	rising 上聲	dark departing 陰去	light departing 陽去	dark entering 陰入	light entering 陽入
Tone contour	˥ (55)	˨ (22)	˥˩ (51)	˧˨˦ (324)	˨˧˩ (231)	˨˩ (21)	˥ (5)
