= Battle of Huangtiandang =

Battle in 1130 in China

- Part of the Jin–Song Wars
| Date | 1130 |
| Location | Huangtiandang, between Jurong, Zhenjiang and northeast of today's Nanjing, Jiangsu |
| Result | Jin troops were trapped at Huangtiandang for 48 days, but eventually gained victory |

Belligerents
| Jurchen Jin dynasty | Southern Song dynasty |

Commanders and leaders
| Wuzhu | Han Shizhong; Liang Hongyu |

Strength
| 100,000 (according to History of Song); 4,000 (according to History of Jin) | 8,000 |

The Battle of Huangtiandang (simplified Chinese: 黄天荡之战; traditional Chinese: 黃天蕩之戰) was an early battle in the Jin–Song Wars. From 1129, the Jin forces led by Wuzhu marched southward, successively conquering several important cities north of the Yangtze River. Wuzhu sent forces to chase after the Song court, but was ambushed by Song forces led by Han Shizhong and Liang Hongyu at Huangtiandang, northeast of today's Nanjing city. The Jin army was trapped there for 48 days, but finally was able to retreat on the suggestion of a Song resident.

== Background ==
In July 1129, the Jin troops started to invade Song territory in four directions: Wanyan Chang from the east, Wuzhu from the middle, Wanyan Loushi from the west, and other troops led by Wanyan Balisu. Emperor Gaozong ordered the chancellor Du Chong to abandon the defense of Kaifeng, withdrawing his fellow soldiers to the south of the Yangtze River. Then Wanyan Chang successfully conquered Weizhou and Laizhou. On September 26, the Song emperor called the generals together to discuss solutions. Zhang Jun and Xin Qizong suggested pulling back the army to Changsha, but Han Shizhong objected. He stated that the Jiangsu and Zhejiang areas were rich and populous, and crucial to the empire, so must not be surrendered. Lü Yihao agreed with him.

Emperor Gaozong appointed Du Chong to defend Jiankang (the capital of Song), Han Shizhong to defend Zhenjiang, and Liu Guangshi to defend Taipingzhou and Chizhou. The emperor went to Pingjiang, and arrived at Yuezhou on November 28. By that time, Wuzhu had captured Shanzhou and Yingtianfu. Wanyan Balisu took Shouchun and Huangzhou, then occupied Jiangzhou on November 9. On December 28, Wuzhu's forces stormed Zhenzhou; several days later they crossed the Yangtze River at the ferry of Majiadu. On January 8, Du Chong capitulated to Jin's troops and Jiankang was lost.

Han Shizhong loaded all the material reserves in Zhenjiang onto his seagoing vessels, and burned the military installations in the city. His fleet moved to Jiangyin and then to the modern Shanghai area. Yue Fei engaged in combat with the Jin troops, finally lost Guangde. Hangzhou and Yuezhou fell successively on January 22 and February 4. The Song court was forced to flee on ships near Wenzhou and Taizhou, Zhejiang. The Jin sent ships to chase after Gaozong, but were defeated by the Song fleet led by Zhang Wenyu.

== Battle ==
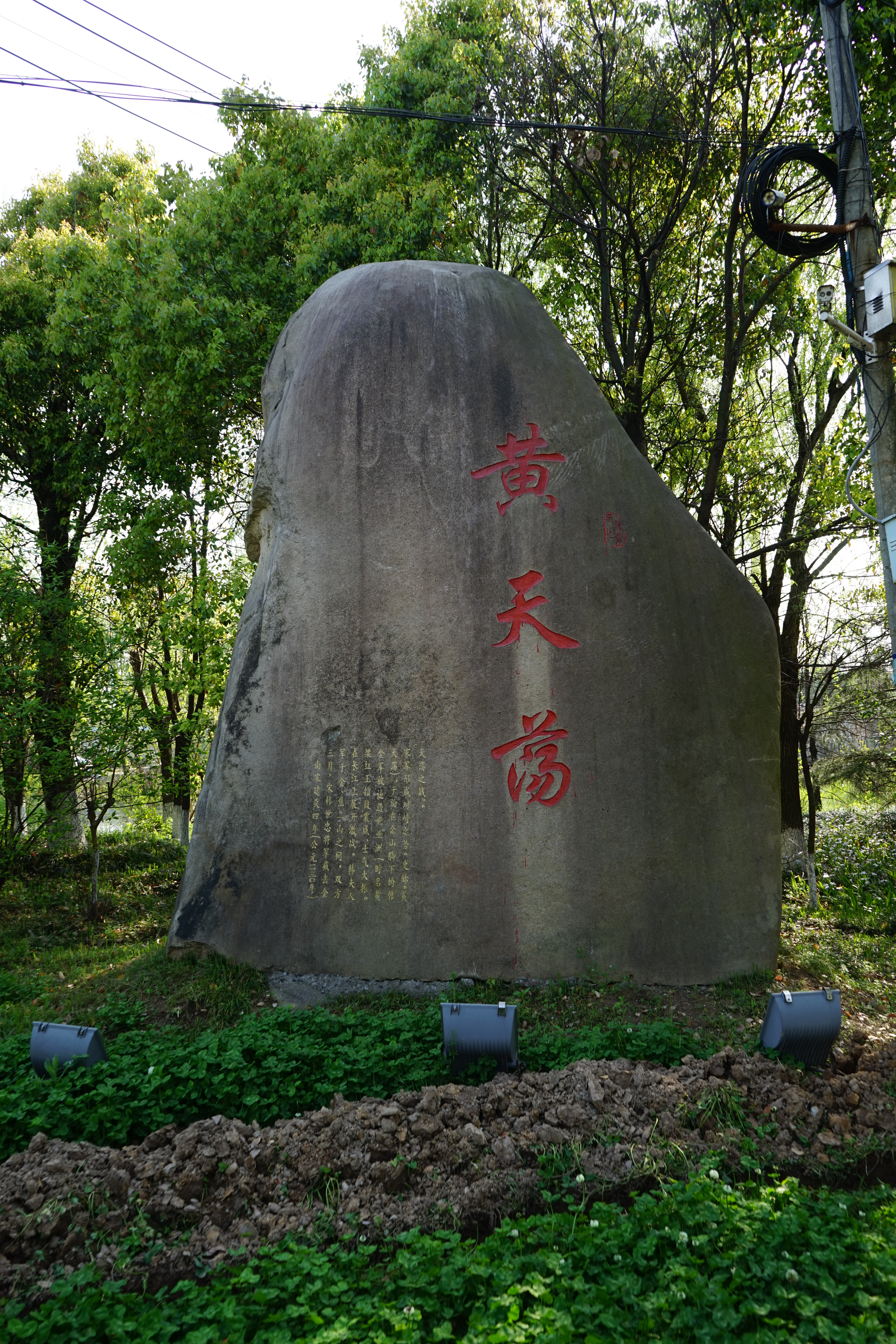
A stele at the site of Huangtiandang.

During the night of the Lantern Festival of 1130, Han Shizhong led about 8,000 soldiers to Zhenjiang and built their encampment near Jiaoshan Temple. They arranged their fleet in a circle, waited for the Jin fleet to come. When Wuzhu arrived at Hangzhou, he faced fierce resistance by the army and residents of Song. On March 14, he gave up the pursuit for Gaozong; ten days later, his army retreated north. On March 29, Wuzhu's army seized Xiuzhou and Wujiang. Five days later, the Jin troops arrived at Pingjiang. Zhou Wang, the highest official of the city, together with government army, abandoned the city. The inhabitants had to choose the weaver Zhao Bingzhong and the monk Shang Yunyi to form a militia. After a day of fierce fighting, the Jin sacked and massacred the city. On April 8, the Jin captured Changzhou.

On April 24, the Song and Jin navies battled one another on the Yangtze River. At first the Song troops were pushed back, but after Liang Hongyu directed the soldiers with her drums, they took advantage and the Jin retreated. Wuzhu sued for peace to Han Shizhong, but was rejected. When he led four Jin generals to survey the battlefield at Jinshan Temple, the Song ambush rushed out, capturing two Jin generals. Wuzhu requested a peace treaty a second time, Han refused him again, and Wuzhu was forced to lead his fleet west. Han's navy chased after him. Han forced his navy into Huangtiandang, a water area about 70 li northeast of Jiankang that joins the Yangtze at one narrow gap. Han ordered his army to block the gap, trapping Wuzhu's troops inside.

Following the suggestion of a Song resident, the Jin soldiers dug a canal of more than 20 li to aid their retreat to Jiankang. Wuzhu got the message that his reinforcements led by Taiyi would arrive at Zhenzhou, so he ordered the army back to Huangtiandang. Han Shizhong's fleet of seagoing vessels were large and stable, and his subordinates made many big iron hooks for dragging rails of the Jin ships. On May 20, the Jin navy started to attack, and within a short time many of the Jin ships were sunk. A Fujian merchant gave a suggestion to fill the ships with earth to keep them stationary, and to wait until a breezeless day to attack so that the big vessels of Song would not be able to move at a fast clip. On June 2, the two navies engaged in combat again. Wuzhu's troops used incendiary arrows to shoot at the sails of Han's ships, and most Song soldiers were burned or drowned. Han Shizhong escaped to Zhenjiang, and the Jin forces were able to head north.
