= Shaowu dialect =

Shao-Jiang Min Chinese dialect

Shaowu
- Native to: Southern China
- Region: Shaowu, Nanping, Fujian
- Language family: Sino-Tibetan: Sinitic; Chinese; Min; Inland Min; Northern Min; Shao–Jiang Min; Shaowu
- Early forms: Proto-Sino-Tibetan: Old Chinese (Note: Min is believed to have split from Old Chinese, rather than Middle Chinese like other varieties of Chinese.); Proto-Min
- Writing system: Romanized Shaowu

Language codes
- ISO 639-3: –
- Glottolog: shao1235
- Linguasphere: 79-AAA-lab

The Shaowu dialect is a dialect of Shao-Jiang Min Chinese spoken in Shaowu, Nanping in northwestern Fujian province of China. It combines elements from Northern Min and Gan Chinese.

== Phonology ==
The Shaowu dialect has 20 initials, 46 rimes and 6 tones.

=== Initials ===
p, pʰ, m, f, v, t, tʰ, n, l, t͡s, t͡sʰ, s, t͡ɕ, t͡ɕʰ, ɕ, k, kʰ, ŋ, x, ʔ

=== Rimes ===
ɿ, i, u, y, a, i, ua, o, io, uo, ie, ye, ə, uə, ɯ, ai, uai, oi, ei, uei, əi, au, iau, ou, iou, əu, an, in, uan, yn, on, uon, en, ien, yen, ən, uən, aŋ, iaŋ, uaŋ, oŋ, ioŋ, uoŋ, ŋ̍, iuŋ, uŋ

=== Tones ===
No.	1	2	3	4	5	6
Tone name	dark level 陰平	light level 陽平	rising 上聲	dark departing 陰去	light departing 陽去	entering 入聲
Tone contour	˨˩ (21)	˨ (22)	˥ (55)	˨˩˧ (213)	˧˥ (35)	˥˧ (53)
