= Gaotang, Fujian =

Gaotang 高唐镇
- Town
- Location in Fujian Gaotang (China)
- Coordinates: 26°48′13″N 117°35′26″E
- Country: People's Republic of China
- Province: Fujian
- Prefecture-level city: Sanming
- County: Jiangle
- Elevation: 144 m (472 ft)
- Time zone: UTC+8 (China Standard)
- Area code: 0598

Gaotang (Chinese: 高唐; pinyin: Gāotáng) is a town of Jiangle County in northwestern Fujian province, China, located 14 kilometres (8.7 mi) northeast of the county seat, Sanming. As of 2011, it has 12 villages under its administration.

== See also ==
- List of township-level divisions of Fujian
