= Liang Hongyu =

Chinese Song Dynasty female general

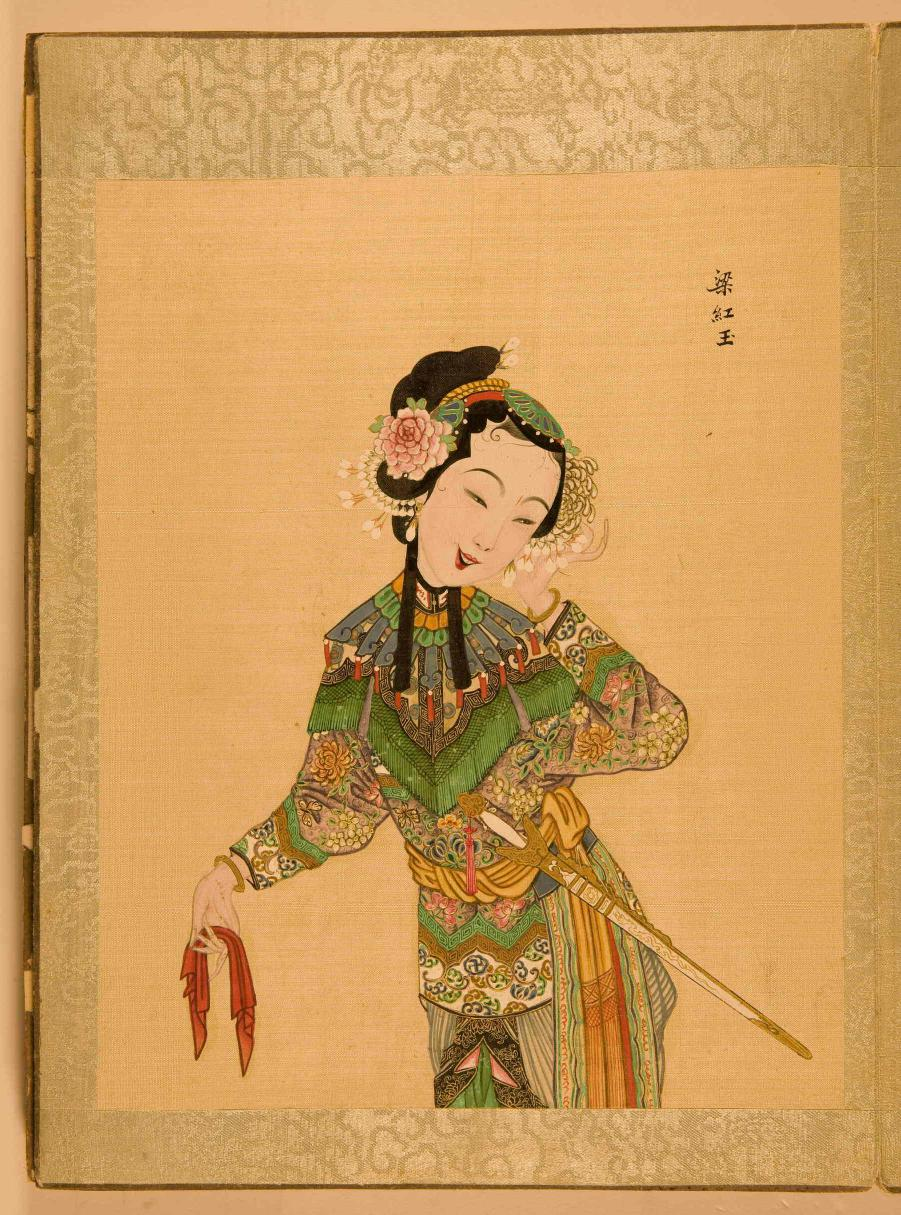
- Qing dynasty illustration.
- Native name: Liáng Shì 梁氏 "Lady Liang"
- Born: c. 1102
- Died: c. 1153 Chuzhou, Anhui Province
- Allegiance: Song dynasty
- Known for: Use of drums as signals in war.
- Conflicts: Battle of Huangtiandang
- Spouse: Han Shizhong

Chinese name
- Traditional Chinese: 梁紅玉
- Simplified Chinese: 梁红玉
Transcriptions
Standard Mandarin
- Hanyu Pinyin: Liáng Hóngyù

Liang Hongyu was a Chinese general of the Song Dynasty. She became famous during the Jin–Song wars against the Jurchen-led Jin Dynasty. Her real given name was lost in time. She was simply referenced in the official Chinese history books as "Lady Liang" (梁氏). Historical details of Liang's life are sketchy, but she was known to be the wife of Han Shizhong, a Song general known for resisting invaders from the Jin Dynasty together with Yue Fei and others, and to have commanded troops at the Battle of Huangtiandang using drums to coordinate the Song forces.

Since her death, several legendary tales have emerged of her life and exploits. These tales give her the name "Hongyu" (红玉), meaning "Red Jade".

== Historical Liang Hongyu ==
There are scant details of the historical Liang Hongyu. Her birthday and birthplace are unknown, although some sources she was born in about 1102 in what is today's Anhui Province. Her early life is unknown. She was a courtesan, good at singing, dancing and painting. Liang Hongyu is also good at playing musical instruments and calligraphy. She met Han Shizong in 1121 while performing. They married and had at least one child.

Han Shizong was a general commanding Song troops against the Jin Dynasty, and Liang accompanied her husband on these campaigns. She is known to have participated at the Battle of Huangtiandang, where her use of flags and drums as signals led to a Song victory. When Han Shizhong resigned after the execution of Yue Fei, Liang followed her husband into retirement.

== Legendary Liang Hongyu ==
Later legends about Liang significantly fleshed out details of her life and exploits. Liang's father was an army commander at the frontier, from where the Song Dynasty was increasingly threatened by the Jurchen-ruled Jin Dynasty. He taught her martial skills. Liang's feet were not bound. She was a master of martial arts. Several accounts stated she was a woman with incredible strength and was a master of archery.

At a certain point in her career, she met her husband, Han Shizhong, though accounts differ on exactly how they met. The most believable version is that she met Han at a banquet where she was entertaining the troops that Han led. Han had led his men in crushing a rebellion in southern China, and Han had personally arrested the rebel leader, Fang La. However, his superior stole his credit, much to Han's displeasure. Liang knew the truth and admired Han's victory. She saved enough money to pay her own redemption from slavery. After she was free, she became Han's second wife.

The Jurchens soon started the total invasion of the Song Dynasty. Han formed an army to fight the Jurchens and Liang worked as a general in her husband's army.

== Battle of Huangtiandang ==
When the Jurchens once more invaded and attacked Hangzhou in 1129, shortly after the coup had been crushed, Liang and her husband led their forces to ambush the enemy army on their way back to Jin territory. Their troops were outnumbered and the Battle of Huangtiandang commenced. This was a series of naval battles fought on the Yangtze River. Liang made a plan by which she would direct the soldiers with her drums. When the battle started, the Song troops were pushed back by Jurchen troops due to superior numbers on the Jurchen side. With great courage, Liang threw her helmet and armour, beating the drums and led the charge into the enemy formation. This became the turning point of the battle. Chinese "Tiger Ships", which could spew fire with flame throwers, destroyed many Jin ships while Liang directed them with her drumming. The Jurchens were trapped for more than a month, before a traitor revealed a weakness in the Chinese encirclement and they escaped, but with heavy losses.

== Later life ==
In 1135 Han was appointed jiedushi of Wuning Anhua (武寧安化軍節度使). Liang and her husband rebuilt the fortress of Chuzhou and increased its defence. They and their soldiers also worked on the rebuilding of houses and the planting of fields.

In 1136, Han Shizhong was awarded the title of Jiedu envoy of Wuning and Anhua towns and Xuanfu disposal envoy of Jingdong and Huaidong roads, and opened an official office in Chuzhou. Liang Hongyu followed her husband out of Chuzhou, and Han Shizhong "draped himself on grass and set up a military mansion" and shared the joys and sorrows with the soldiers. His wife Liang Hongyu also personally "weaved thin sheets into the house".

After Liang Hongyu's death, she was given the title of Mrs. Binguo (邠国夫人) by the court. The posthumous article lamented that Liang Hongyu and Han Shizhong "eventually grew old hand in hand even after becoming rich". The exact time of Liang Hongyu's death is unknown, but it is generally believed that she died in 1153.

== Legacy ==
Poetry was written in her honour, which contributed to her fame.

Together with Qin Liangyu, He Yufeng, and the legendary Hua Mulan, she is one of the most well-known female warriors in China.
