= Sanji, Fujian =

Sanji 三际
- Village
- Location in Fujian
- Coordinates: 27°15′04″N 117°30′08″E
- Country: People's Republic of China
- Province: Fujian
- Prefecture-level city: Nanping
- County-level city: Shaowu
- Town: Chengjiao (城郊镇)
- Elevation: 310 m (1,020 ft)
- Time zone: UTC+8 (China Standard)

Sanji (Chinese: 三际) is a village in Chengjiao (城郊镇), Shaowu, in Nanping, a prefecture-level city in northwestern Fujian province, China. It is located in the central part of the Wuyi Mountains, southeast of Shaowu.

== Climate ==
Sanji, like the rest of Nanping, has a monsoon-influenced humid subtropical climate (Köppen Cfa), with short, mild winters and very hot, humid summers. The monthly daily mean temperature ranges from 7.3 °C (45.1 °F) in January to 27.7 °C (81.9 °F) in July. There is a marked decline in rainfall in autumn and early winter, and rainfall is both frequent and heavy during spring and early summer.

== See also ==
- List of villages in China
