= Wan'an, Jiangle County =

Wan'an 万安镇
- Town
- Location in Fujian Wan'an (China)
- Coordinates: 26.8938°N 117.4332°E
- Country: People's Republic of China
- Province: Fujian
- Prefecture-level city: Sanming
- County: Jiangle County
- Time zone: UTC+8 (China Standard)

Wan'an (simplified Chinese: 万安; traditional Chinese: 萬安; pinyin: Wàn'ān) is a town under the administration of Jiangle County, Fujian, China. As of 2018, it has one residential community, 8 villages, and one stock farm area under its administration.
