= Wanquan Township, Fujian =

Wanquan Township 万全乡
- Township
- Location in Fujian Wanquan Township (China)
- Coordinates: 26.6720°N 117.1912°E
- Country: People's Republic of China
- Province: Fujian
- Prefecture-level city: Sanming
- County: Jiangle County
- Time zone: UTC+8 (China Standard)

Wanquan Township (simplified Chinese: 万全乡; traditional Chinese: 萬全鄉; pinyin: Wànquán Xiāng) is a township under the administration of Jiangle County, Fujian, China. As of 2018, it has 9 villages under its administration.
