= Yinzhou =

Yinzhou may refer to the following locations：

== Modern locations ==
- Yinzhou District, Tieling (银州区), Liaoning, China
- Yinzhou District, Ningbo (鄞州区), Zhejiang, China

== Historical locations ==
- Yinzhou (historical prefecture), a prefecture in modern Shaanxi, China between the 6th and 12th centuries
