= Shaowu =

Shaowu 邵武市
- County-level city
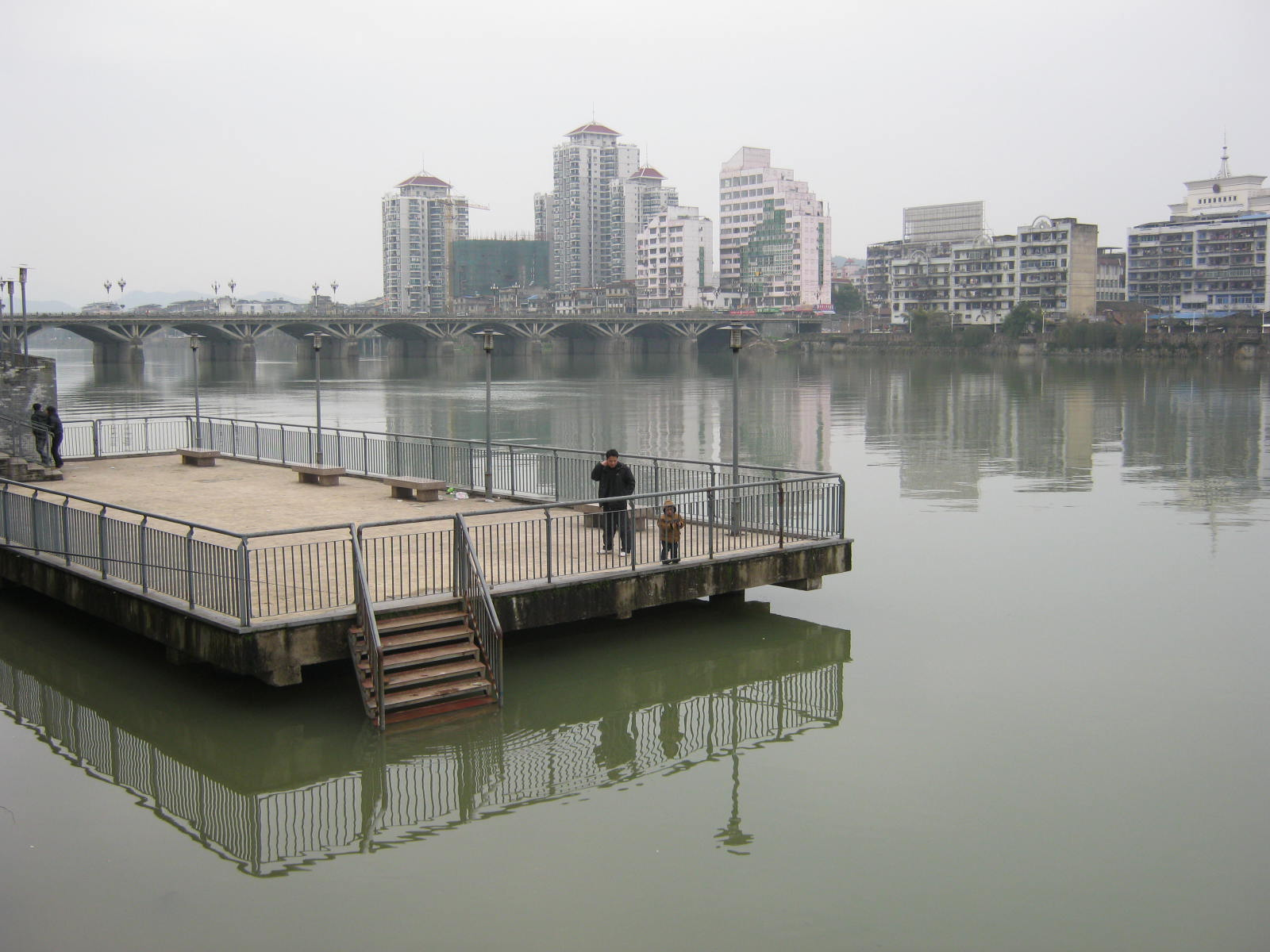
- Bayi Bridge
- Nickname: Southern Wuyi
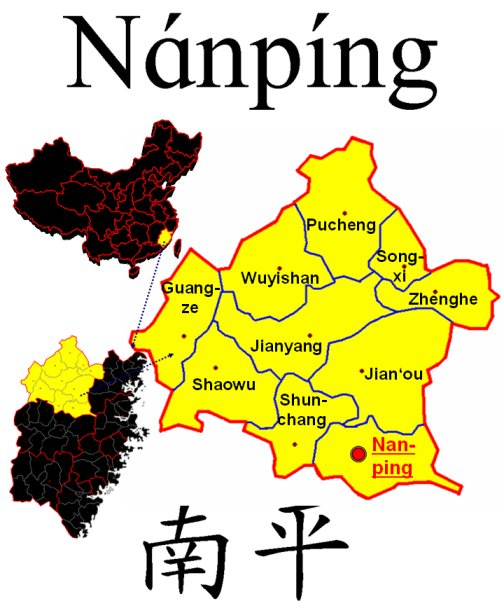
- Location of Shaowu City within Nanping City

- Location of the city center in Fujian
- Coordinates (Shaowu government): 27°20′25″N 117°29′33″E
- Country: People's Republic of China
- Province: Fujian
- Prefecture-level city: Nanping

Government
  - CPC City Committee Secretary: He Guangsong

Area
  - Total: 2,859.6 km^{2} (1,104.1 sq mi)

Population (2020)
  - Total: 273,721
- Time zone: UTC+8 (China Standard)
- Postal code: 354000
- Area code: (86)0599
- Website: www.shaowu.gov.cn

Shaowu (Chinese: 邵武; pinyin: Shàowǔ) is a county-level city in northwestern Fujian province, China. It is located in the central part of the Wuyi Mountains and borders Jiangxi province to the west. The city has a population of over 270,000. The local dialect incorporates elements of both Northern Min and Gan Chinese.

== Administration ==
=== Subdistricts ===
- Zhaoyang (昭阳街道)
- Tongtai (通泰街道)
- Shuibei (水北街道)
- Shaikou (晒口街道)

=== Towns ===
- Chengjiao (城郊镇)
- Shuibei (水北镇)
- Xiasha (下沙镇)
- Weimin (卫闽镇)
- Heping (和平镇)
- Nakou (拿口镇)
- Hongdun (洪墩镇)
- Dabugang (大埠岗镇)
- Yanshan (沿山镇)
- Xiaojiafang (肖家坊镇)
- Dazhu (大竹镇)
- Wujiatang (吴家塘镇)

=== Townships ===
- Guilin (桂林乡)
- Zhangcuo (张厝乡)
- Jinkeng (金坑乡)

== Climate ==
Shaowu has a monsoon-influenced humid subtropical climate (Köppen Cfa), with short, mild winters and very hot, humid summers. The monthly daily mean temperature ranges from 7.5 °C (45.5 °F) in January to 27.9 °C (82.2 °F) in July. There is a marked decline in rainfall in autumn and early winter, and rainfall is both frequent and heavy during spring and early summer.

Climate data for Shaowu, elevation 218 m (715 ft), (1991–2020 normals, extremes 1971–2010)
Month	Jan	Feb	Mar	Apr	May	Jun	Jul	Aug	Sep	Oct	Nov	Dec	Year
Record high °C (°F)	27.5 (81.5)	32.6 (90.7)	32.8 (91.0)	35.1 (95.2)	35.7 (96.3)	37.3 (99.1)	40.4 (104.7)	40.3 (104.5)	38.3 (100.9)	35.8 (96.4)	31.9 (89.4)	25.7 (78.3)	40.4 (104.7)
Mean daily maximum °C (°F)	13.0 (55.4)	15.5 (59.9)	18.5 (65.3)	24.1 (75.4)	28.0 (82.4)	30.5 (86.9)	34.0 (93.2)	33.6 (92.5)	30.9 (87.6)	26.6 (79.9)	21.0 (69.8)	15.4 (59.7)	24.3 (75.7)
Daily mean °C (°F)	7.6 (45.7)	9.9 (49.8)	13.2 (55.8)	18.4 (65.1)	22.5 (72.5)	25.5 (77.9)	28.0 (82.4)	27.5 (81.5)	24.9 (76.8)	20.0 (68.0)	14.5 (58.1)	9.1 (48.4)	18.4 (65.2)
Mean daily minimum °C (°F)	4.3 (39.7)	6.4 (43.5)	9.8 (49.6)	14.6 (58.3)	18.9 (66.0)	22.2 (72.0)	23.8 (74.8)	23.7 (74.7)	21.0 (69.8)	15.7 (60.3)	10.4 (50.7)	5.1 (41.2)	14.7 (58.4)
Record low °C (°F)	−6.6 (20.1)	−4.8 (23.4)	−4.3 (24.3)	2.2 (36.0)	8.4 (47.1)	13.5 (56.3)	19.1 (66.4)	15.9 (60.6)	11.6 (52.9)	0.9 (33.6)	−4.2 (24.4)	−8.5 (16.7)	−8.5 (16.7)
Average precipitation mm (inches)	78.9 (3.11)	106.3 (4.19)	227.7 (8.96)	219.0 (8.62)	277.5 (10.93)	378.8 (14.91)	181.9 (7.16)	158.3 (6.23)	78.6 (3.09)	50.9 (2.00)	81.2 (3.20)	63.3 (2.49)	1,902.4 (74.89)
Average precipitation days (≥ 0.1 mm)	12.1	13.5	18.7	17.5	17.9	18.5	13.0	14.0	9.2	6.9	8.5	9.2	159
Average snowy days	0.9	0.6	0.1	0	0	0	0	0	0	0	0	0.5	2.1
Average relative humidity (%)	80	80	82	81	81	83	78	78	78	77	80	78	80
Mean monthly sunshine hours	78.7	78.5	79.2	95.6	111.1	107.5	199.6	183.4	159.1	155.4	118.4	109.9	1,476.4
Percentage possible sunshine	24	25	21	25	27	26	47	46	43	44	37	34	33
Source 1: China Meteorological Administration
Source 2: Weather China

== Transportation ==
=== Expressway ===
- G70 Fuzhou-Yinchuan Expressway
- S03_{11} Pucheng-Jianning Expressway
- S03_{12} Shaowu-Guangze Expressway

=== National Highway ===
- G316

=== County-level roads ===
These are designated "县道"

- X804
- X805
- X829

== Tourist Attractions ==
- Mount Yunling (云灵山): located in Longdou Village, Shuibei Town
- Wuyi Hot Springs (武夷温泉): located in Shaikou Subdistrict
- China Maze Town (中国迷宫小镇): located in Weimin Town, the biggest botanical labyrinth in Fujian

== Culture ==
- Zhuandiao (砖雕)
- Shaowu Huagudeng (邵武花鼓灯)
- Shaowu Puppetry (邵武木偶戏)
- Dabugang Nanci (大埠岗南词)
- Nanci Beidiao (南词北调)
- the making of Nuo-Dance Masks (傩舞面具制作技艺)
- Jostling-for-Wine Festival (抢酒节): originated from Hefang Village, Hongdun Town

== Specialty ==
- Shaowu baoci (邵武包糍)
- Youjiang tofu (游浆豆腐)

== Notable people ==
- Tsui Po-ko
- Wu Meijin
- He Jiting

== See also ==
- List of administrative divisions of Fujian
- Sanji, a village in Chengjiao Town, Shaowu
