= Guangze County =

Guangze County 光泽县 Kwangtseh
- County
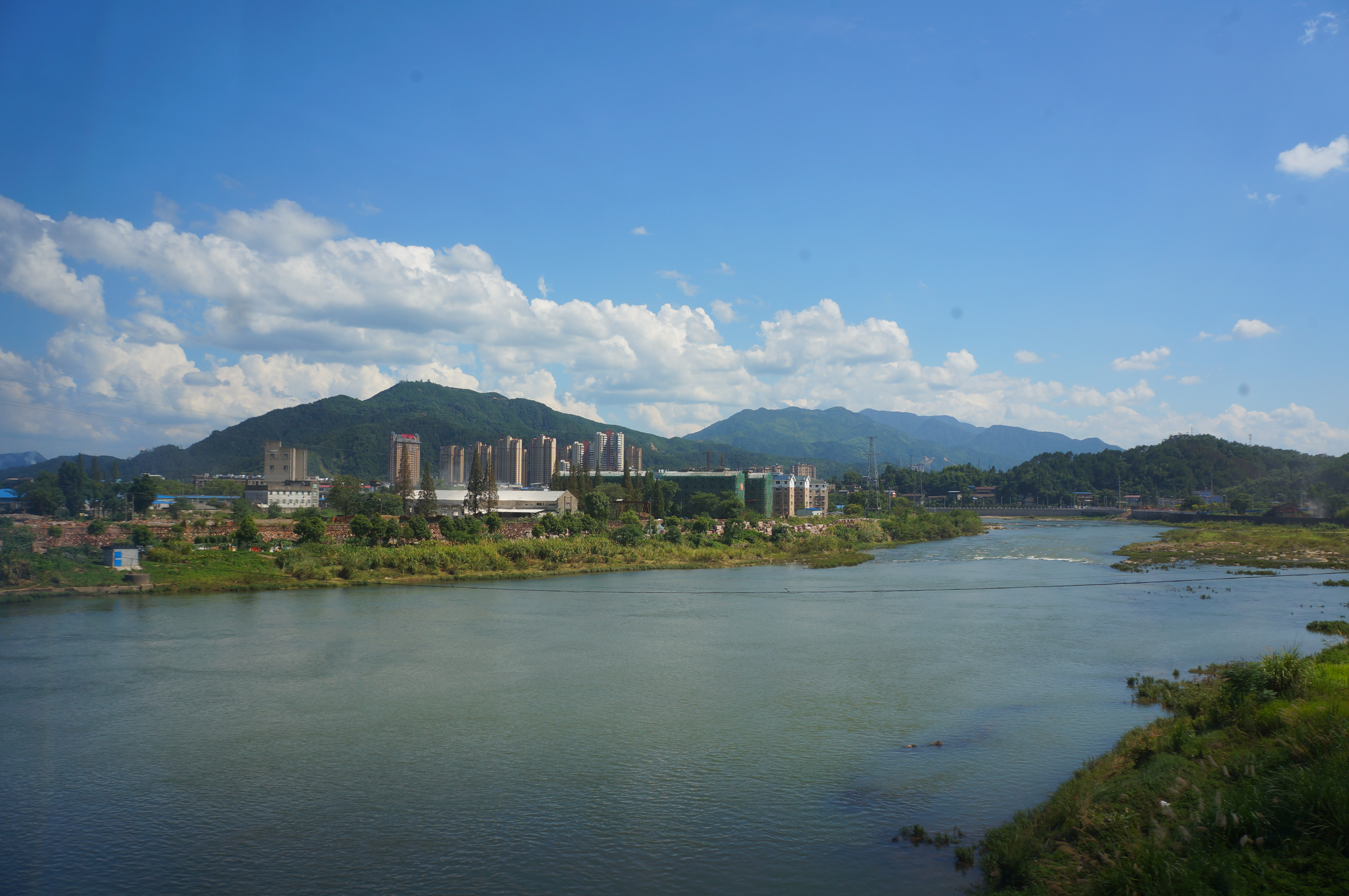

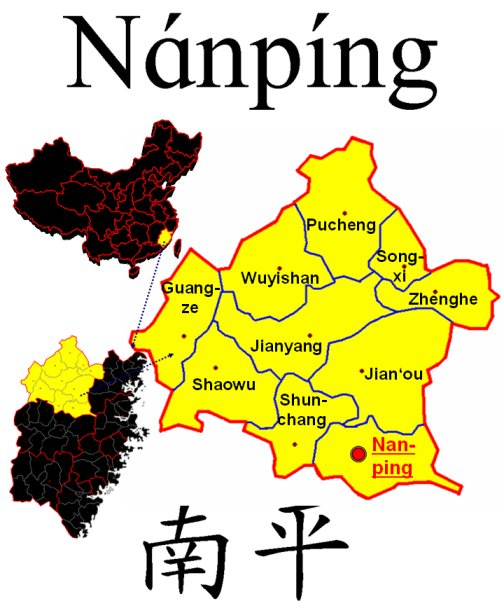
- Location of Guangze County within Nanping City

- Location of the seat in Fujian
- Coordinates: 27°40′N 117°23′E
- Administered by: People's Republic of China
- PRC Province: Fujian
- Prefecture-level city: Nanping

Government
  - CPC County Committee Secretary: Chen Minhui

Area
  - Total: 2,241 km^{2} (865 sq mi)

Population (2020 census)
  - Total: 130,294
  - Density: 58.14/km^{2} (150.6/sq mi)
- Time zone: UTC+8 (China Standard)
- Division code: GZE
- Website: www.guangze.gov.cn

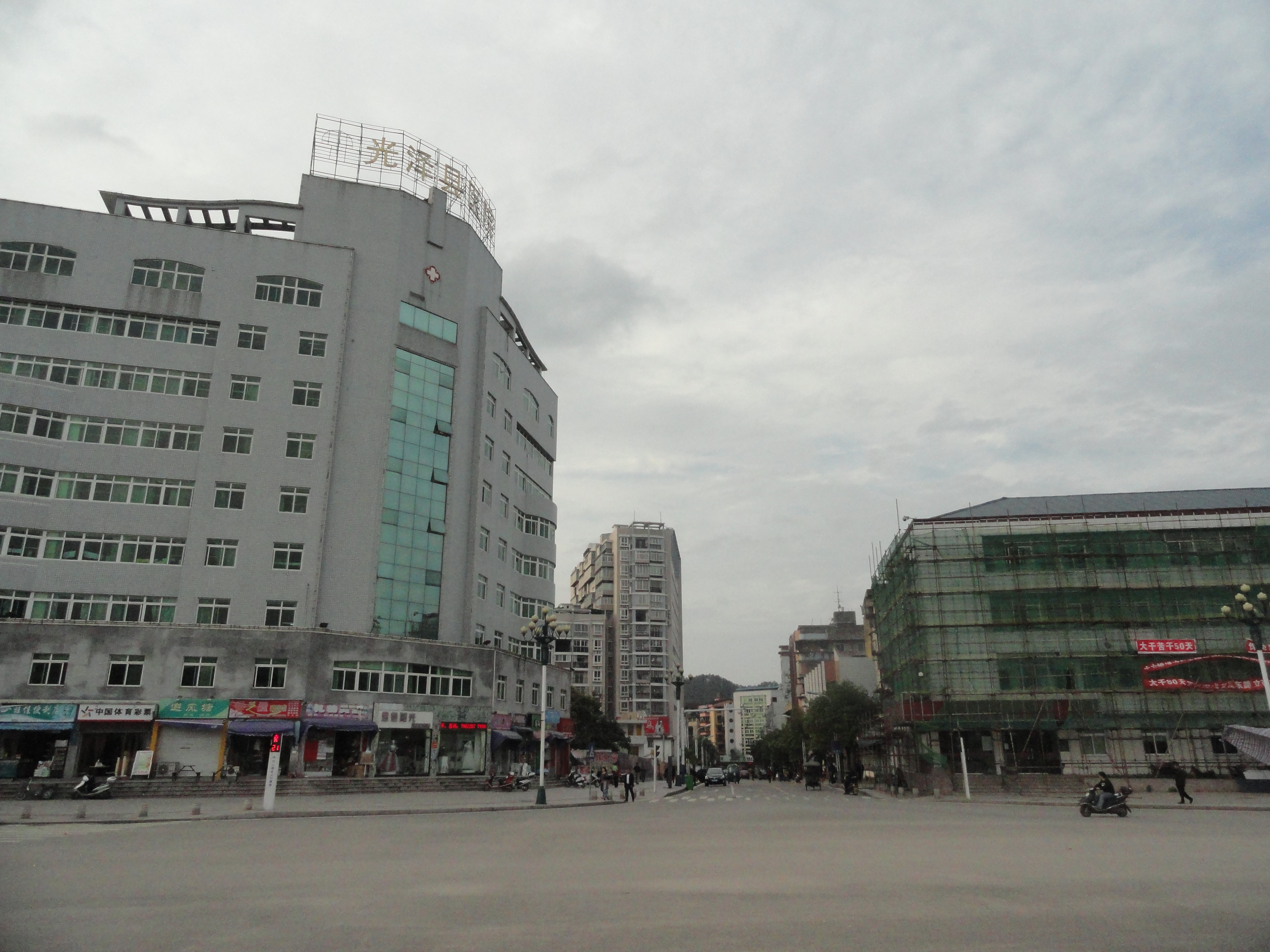
The city of Guangze County

Guangze (Guangze; simplified Chinese: 光泽县; traditional Chinese: 光澤縣; pinyin: Guāngzé Xiàn) is a county in northwestern Fujian province, People's Republic of China, bordering Jiangxi to the north and west. During the Republican period, Guangze County formed a part of Jiangxi province. Fujian Sunner Food Co., Ltd. located in Shilipu is one of the biggest companies in Guangze.

== Administration ==
=== 3 Towns ===
- Hangchuan (杭川镇)
- Zhaili (寨里镇)
- Zhima (止马镇)

=== 5 Townships ===
- Luanfeng (鸾凤乡)
- Chongren (崇仁乡)
- Lifang (李坊乡)
- Huaqiao (华桥乡)
- Siqian (司前乡)

== Transportation ==
=== Expressway ===
- S03_{12} Shaowu-Guangze Expressway

=== National Highway ===
- G316

=== County-level Road (县道) ===
- X827
- X829

== Industry ==
- Fujian Sunner Industry Co., Ltd. (圣农实业)

== Climate ==
Climate data for Guangze, elevation 268 m (879 ft), (1991–2020 normals, extremes 1981–2010)
| Month | Jan | Feb | Mar | Apr | May | Jun | Jul | Aug | Sep | Oct | Nov | Dec | Year |
|---|---|---|---|---|---|---|---|---|---|---|---|---|---|
| Record high °C (°F) | 27.4 (81.3) | 31.0 (87.8) | 32.9 (91.2) | 35.0 (95.0) | 35.5 (95.9) | 37.3 (99.1) | 40.5 (104.9) | 39.5 (103.1) | 37.6 (99.7) | 36.4 (97.5) | 31.1 (88.0) | 26.1 (79.0) | 40.5 (104.9) |
| Mean daily maximum °C (°F) | 12.1 (53.8) | 14.8 (58.6) | 18.0 (64.4) | 23.7 (74.7) | 27.6 (81.7) | 30.0 (86.0) | 33.5 (92.3) | 33.1 (91.6) | 30.4 (86.7) | 26.0 (78.8) | 20.4 (68.7) | 14.7 (58.5) | 23.7 (74.7) |
| Daily mean °C (°F) | 6.8 (44.2) | 9.3 (48.7) | 12.7 (54.9) | 18.0 (64.4) | 22.2 (72.0) | 25.1 (77.2) | 27.6 (81.7) | 27.1 (80.8) | 24.3 (75.7) | 19.3 (66.7) | 13.9 (57.0) | 8.3 (46.9) | 17.9 (64.2) |
| Mean daily minimum °C (°F) | 3.3 (37.9) | 5.6 (42.1) | 9.1 (48.4) | 14.1 (57.4) | 18.5 (65.3) | 21.9 (71.4) | 23.6 (74.5) | 23.4 (74.1) | 20.4 (68.7) | 14.9 (58.8) | 9.5 (49.1) | 4.2 (39.6) | 14.0 (57.3) |
| Record low °C (°F) | −7.5 (18.5) | −5.4 (22.3) | −5.7 (21.7) | 2.0 (35.6) | 7.8 (46.0) | 11.5 (52.7) | 19.0 (66.2) | 16.9 (62.4) | 10.9 (51.6) | 1.3 (34.3) | −3.8 (25.2) | −10.8 (12.6) | −10.8 (12.6) |
| Average precipitation mm (inches) | 89.0 (3.50) | 111.9 (4.41) | 225.0 (8.86) | 237.6 (9.35) | 297.9 (11.73) | 424.7 (16.72) | 204.3 (8.04) | 163.2 (6.43) | 90.2 (3.55) | 51.9 (2.04) | 89.6 (3.53) | 65.3 (2.57) | 2,050.6 (80.73) |
| Average precipitation days (≥ 0.1 mm) | 13.6 | 14.0 | 19.0 | 17.9 | 18.1 | 18.5 | 13.6 | 14.8 | 10.3 | 7.2 | 9.6 | 10.1 | 166.7 |
| Average snowy days | 1.9 | 1.4 | 0.3 | 0 | 0 | 0 | 0 | 0 | 0 | 0 | 0 | 0.6 | 4.2 |
| Average relative humidity (%) | 82 | 80 | 81 | 80 | 80 | 83 | 78 | 80 | 79 | 78 | 80 | 80 | 80 |
| Mean monthly sunshine hours | 81.4 | 82.2 | 82.3 | 103.7 | 120.9 | 117.5 | 207.0 | 187.0 | 161.4 | 155.2 | 124.4 | 117.9 | 1,540.9 |
| Percentage possible sunshine | 25 | 26 | 22 | 27 | 29 | 28 | 49 | 46 | 44 | 44 | 39 | 37 | 35 |
Source: China Meteorological Administration

== See also ==
- List of administrative divisions of Fujian
- Wuyi New Area
