= Jiangle County =

Jiangle County 将乐县 Tsianglo; Chianglo
- County
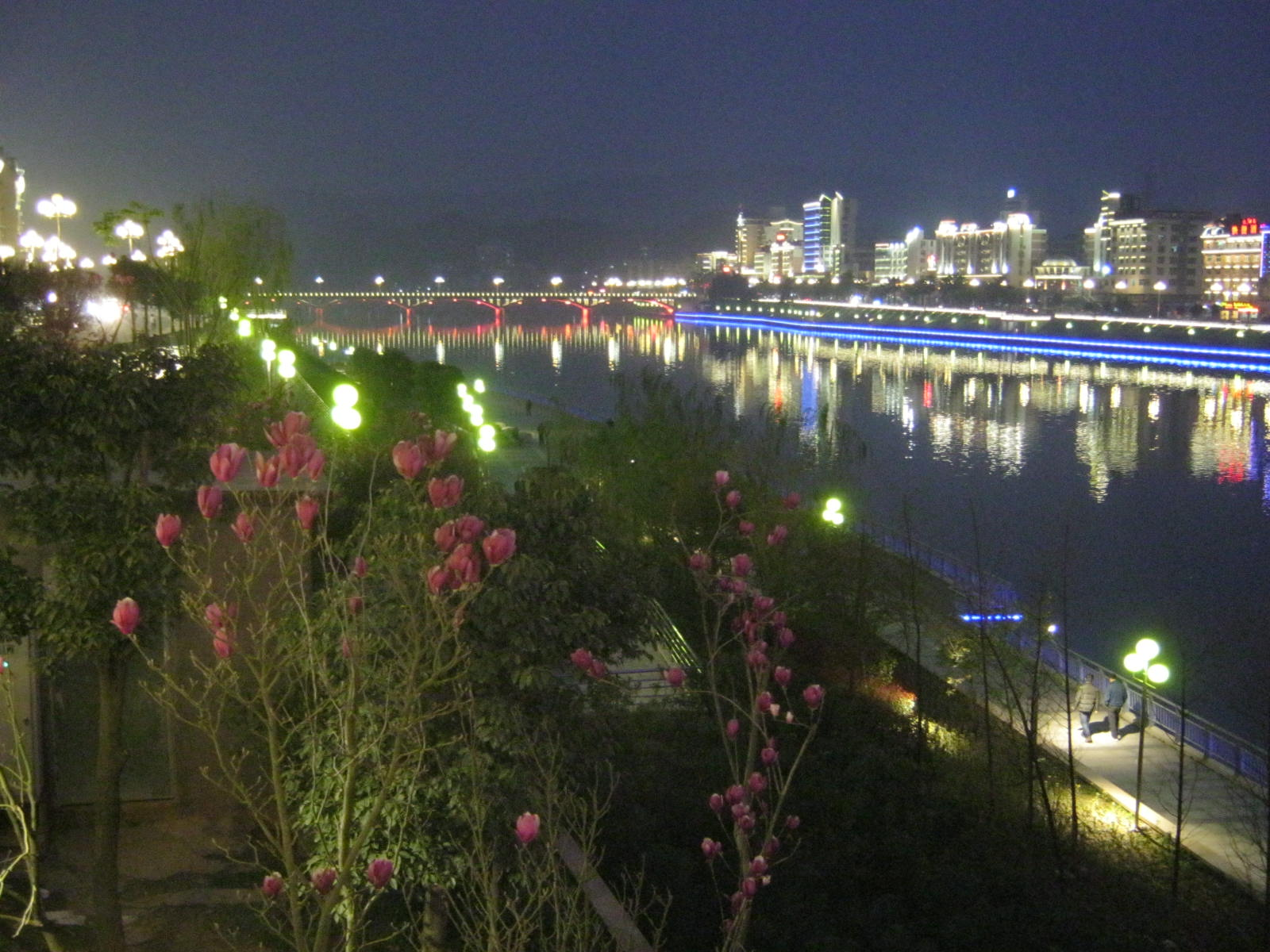
- Sanhua Bridge (三华桥)

- Location of the seat in Fujian
- Coordinates: 26°43′N 117°28′E
- Country: People's Republic of China
- Province: Fujian
- Prefecture-level city: Sanming

Area
  - Total: 2,247 km^{2} (868 sq mi)

Population
  - Total: 148,867
  - Density: 66.25/km^{2} (171.6/sq mi)
- Time zone: UTC+8 (China Standard)

Jiangle County (simplified Chinese: 将乐县; traditional Chinese: 將樂縣; pinyin: Jiānglè Xiàn) is a county of western Fujian province, People's Republic of China. It is under the administration of Sanming City.

== Administrative divisions ==
Towns:

- Guyong (古镛镇), Wan'an (万安镇), Gaotang (高唐镇), Bailian (白莲镇), Huangtan (黄潭镇), Shuinan (水南镇)

Townships:

- Guangming Township (光明乡), Moyuan Township (漠源乡), Nankou Township (南口乡), Wanquan Township (万全乡), Anren Township (安仁乡), Dayuan Township (大源乡), Xufang Township (余坊乡)

== Climate ==
Climate data for Jiangle, elevation 174 m (571 ft), (1991–2020 normals)
| Month | Jan | Feb | Mar | Apr | May | Jun | Jul | Aug | Sep | Oct | Nov | Dec | Year |
|---|---|---|---|---|---|---|---|---|---|---|---|---|---|
| Mean daily maximum °C (°F) | 14.7 (58.5) | 17.0 (62.6) | 20.0 (68.0) | 25.4 (77.7) | 29.0 (84.2) | 31.5 (88.7) | 34.9 (94.8) | 34.5 (94.1) | 31.9 (89.4) | 27.6 (81.7) | 22.2 (72.0) | 16.9 (62.4) | 25.5 (77.8) |
| Daily mean °C (°F) | 9.3 (48.7) | 11.4 (52.5) | 14.4 (57.9) | 19.5 (67.1) | 23.2 (73.8) | 26.0 (78.8) | 28.3 (82.9) | 27.9 (82.2) | 25.6 (78.1) | 21.0 (69.8) | 15.9 (60.6) | 10.7 (51.3) | 19.4 (67.0) |
| Mean daily minimum °C (°F) | 6.0 (42.8) | 8.1 (46.6) | 11.1 (52.0) | 15.8 (60.4) | 19.6 (67.3) | 22.6 (72.7) | 24.1 (75.4) | 24.1 (75.4) | 21.8 (71.2) | 16.9 (62.4) | 12.2 (54.0) | 7.1 (44.8) | 15.8 (60.4) |
| Average precipitation mm (inches) | 73.9 (2.91) | 106.1 (4.18) | 216.3 (8.52) | 211.2 (8.31) | 284.5 (11.20) | 344.2 (13.55) | 153.1 (6.03) | 151.4 (5.96) | 71.1 (2.80) | 54.4 (2.14) | 73.9 (2.91) | 58.7 (2.31) | 1,798.8 (70.82) |
| Average precipitation days (≥ 0.1 mm) | 12.1 | 14.1 | 18.3 | 17.0 | 18.7 | 18.3 | 12.4 | 15.1 | 9.6 | 6.8 | 8.8 | 9.4 | 160.6 |
| Average snowy days | 0.4 | 0.3 | 0 | 0 | 0 | 0 | 0 | 0 | 0 | 0 | 0 | 0.2 | 0.9 |
| Average relative humidity (%) | 80 | 81 | 82 | 81 | 82 | 83 | 77 | 78 | 77 | 77 | 80 | 79 | 80 |
| Mean monthly sunshine hours | 80.9 | 79.4 | 81.2 | 99.3 | 119.1 | 125.6 | 217.7 | 195.8 | 162.9 | 147.0 | 112.8 | 105.4 | 1,527.1 |
| Percentage possible sunshine | 25 | 25 | 22 | 26 | 29 | 30 | 52 | 49 | 44 | 42 | 35 | 33 | 34 |
Source: China Meteorological Administration

== Transportation ==
- Xiangtang–Putian Railway

== Tourism ==
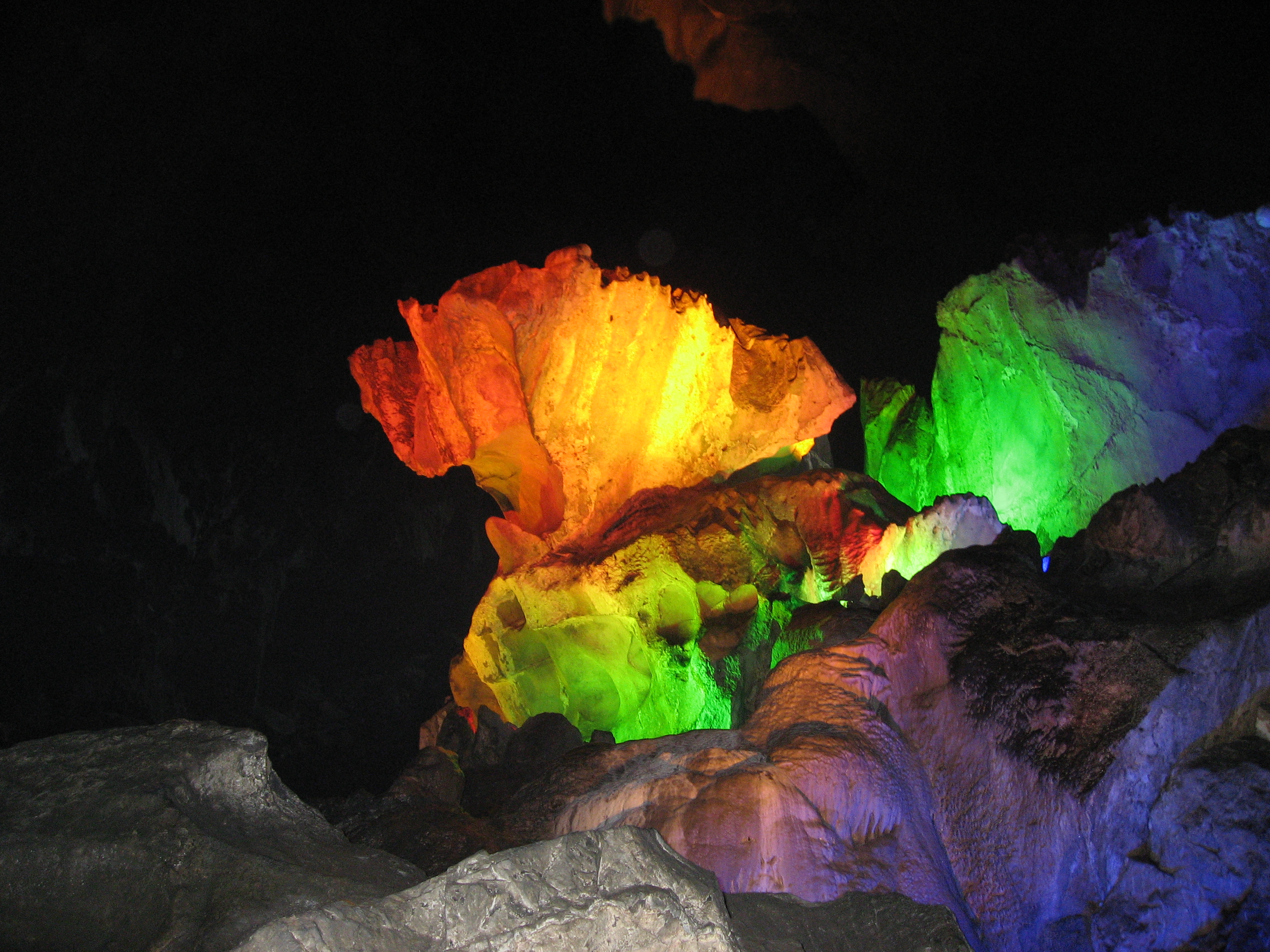
Yuhua Cave

- Yuhua Cave
