= Luoyang (disambiguation) =

Luoyang or Loyang is a prefecture-level city in Henan Province, China.

Luoyang or Loyang may also refer to:

- Loyang, Singapore, an area of Singapore
- Luoyang, Boluo County, Guangdong, China
- Luoyang River, a river in Fujian, China
- Luoyang Bridge (Quanzhou), a famed bridge across the Luoyang River in Quanzhou
- The Old City of Luoyang, historical Luoyang city under Wei and Han dynasties

== Entertainment ==
- Luoyang, a 2021 Chinese television series

== Other uses ==
- ROCS Lo Yang, the name of multiple destroyers of the Republic of China Navy:
  - ROCS Lo Yang (DD-14) (Benson class), previously USS Benson
  - ROCS Lo Yang (DD-14) (Allen M. Sumner class), previously USS Taussig
