= Luo language =

Luo language or Lwo language may refer to:

- Luo languages, a family of Nilotic languages spoken by the Luo peoples from southern Sudan to southern Kenya
  - Luo dialect or Dholuo, a dialect of the Luo group of Nilotic languages
- Luo language (Cameroon), an unclassified language spoken in the Atta region of Cameroon
- Luwo language, a Nilotic language spoken by the Luwo people in South Sudan

== See also ==
- Southern Luo language, a dialect cluster of Uganda and neighboring countries
- Luo people, an ethnic group native to western Kenya and northern Tanzania
- Luo peoples, several Nilotic ethnic groups that inhabit an area ranging from Egypt and Sudan to Kenya and Tanzania
- Luo script, an alphabet invented c. 2021 to write Luo languages
- Luo (disambiguation)
- LWO (disambiguation)
- Lua language (disambiguation)
