= Lua (disambiguation) =

Lua is a lightweight programming language.

Lua or LUA may also refer to:

== Ethnicity and language ==
- Lua people, of Laos
- Lawa people, of Thailand, sometimes referred to as Lua
- Lua language (disambiguation), several languages
- Luba-Kasai language, ISO 639 code

== Places ==
- Lua, one of the Bass Islands (Duff Islands)
- Tenzing-Hillary Airport, Lukla, Nepal, IATA code LUA

== People ==
- Lua (goddess), in Roman mythology
- Lua Blanco (1987–2026), Brazilian actress and singer
- Lua Getsinger (1871–1916), one of the first Western members of the Baháʼí Faith
- Lua Li (born 1991), New Zealand born Tongan rugby player
- Lua Ribeira (born 1986), Galician photographer
- Lua, a member of Weki Meki band
- Mo Lua of Killaloe (died c. 609), also known as Lua, Irish saint
- Nguyễn Thị Lụa (born 1991), Vietnamese wrestler
- Oscar Lua (born 1984), American footballer
- Lai (surname), a Hokkien/Minnan surname sometimes romanised as Lua

== Other uses ==
- "Lua" (song), by Bright Eyes, 2004
- Kapu Kuialua, or Lua, a Hawaiian martial art
- Cyclone Lua, in Western Australia March 2012

== See also ==
- Luas, a tram system in Dublin, Ireland
- LUAS (disambiguation)
- LuaLua (disambiguation)
