= Luojiang =

Luojiang may refer to the following locations in China:

- Luojiang District, Deyang (罗江区), Sichuan
- Luojiang District, Quanzhou (洛江区), Fujian
- Luojiang, Tibet, Tibet, China
- Luojiang, Miluo (罗江镇), a town in Miluo City, Hunan province
- Luojiang, Rong County (罗江镇), a town in Rong County, Guangxi province
- Luojiang, or Luo River (Fujian) (洛江), river in Fujian, China; flows mostly within Luojiang District, Quanzhou
