= Luo River =

Luo River may refer to:

- Luo River (Henan) (洛河, Luòhé), a tributary of the Yellow River, flows mostly in Henan province of China
- Luo River (Shaanxi) (洛河, Luòhé), also known as the North Luo River (北洛河, Běi Luòhé), a river in Shaanxi province of China and the second largest tributary of the Wei River, which is the longest tributary of the Yellow River.
- Luo River (Guangdong) (螺河, Luohe), river in Guangdong, China; flows into South China Sea
- Luo River (Fujian) (洛江, Luojiang), river in Fujian, China; flows into Quanzhou Bay of Taiwan Strait

== See also ==
- Lô River, river in Vietnam
- Luo (disambiguation)
