= LUAS =

LUAS may refer to:

- Luas, a tram system in Dublin, Ireland
- Liverpool University Air Squadron, England, a Royal Air Force training unit
- Lower Universal Anchorage System, a name for the Isofix standard for attachment points for child safety seats in cars

== See also ==
- Lua (disambiguation)
