= Heshi, Fujian =

Heshi 河市镇
- Town
- Location in Fujian Heshi (China)
- Coordinates: 25°02′48″N 118°37′27″E
- Country: People's Republic of China
- Province: Fujian
- Prefecture-level city: Quanzhou
- District: Luojiang District
- Time zone: UTC+8 (China Standard)
- Area code: 0595

Heshi (Chinese: 河市; pinyin: Héshì; lit. 'river city') is a town of Luojiang District, Quanzhou, Fujian province, China. As of 2011, it has 21 villages under its administration.

== See also ==
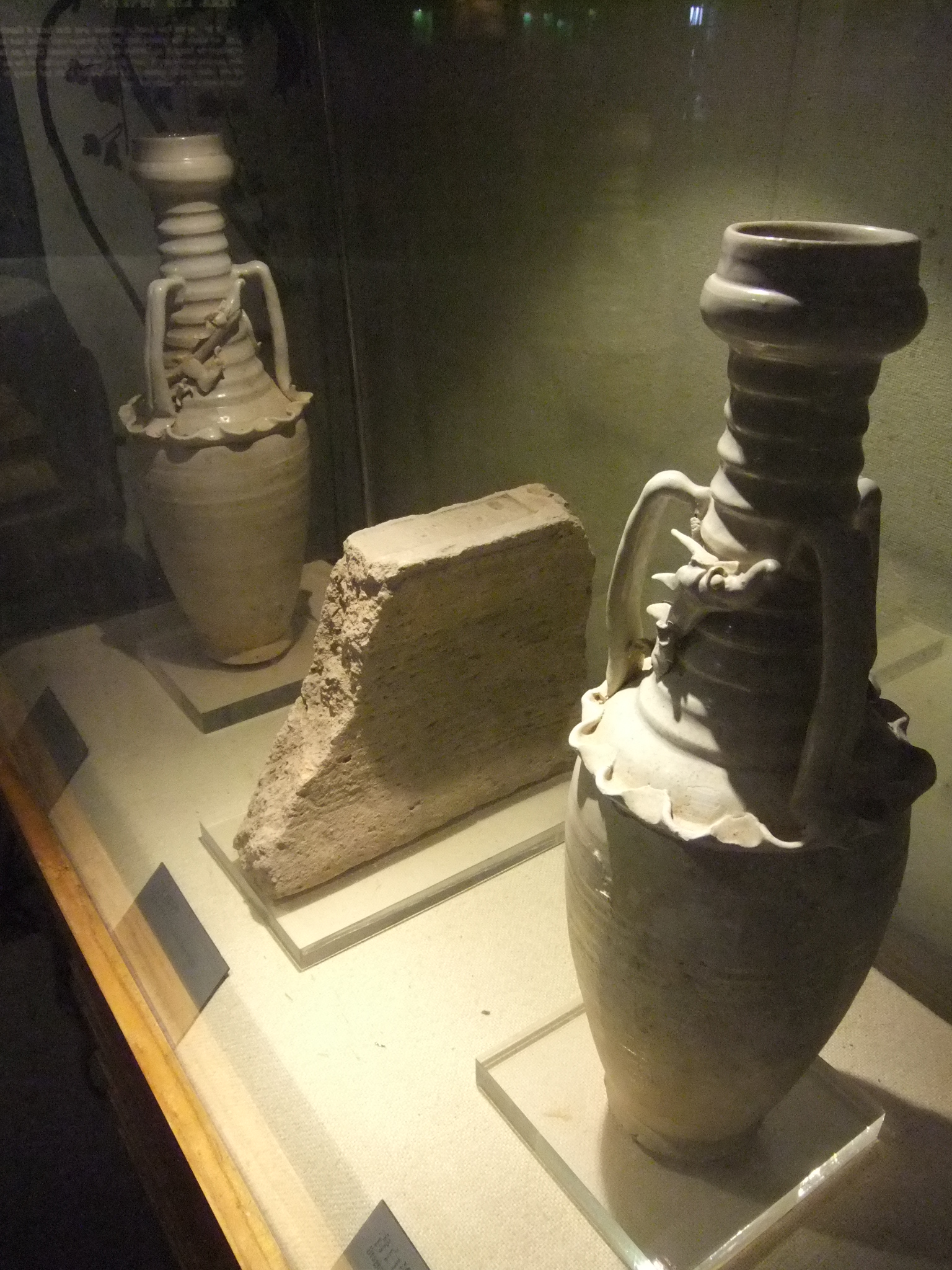
Song dynasty porcelain hunping vases excavated in Heshi

- List of township-level divisions of Fujian
