= LWO =

LWO may refer to:

- Latino World Order, a professional wrestling stable
- LightWave Object (file format)
- Luo peoples or Lwo, an African ethnic linguistic group
  - Luo people of Kenya and Tanzania, an indigenous people of Kenya and Tanzania
  - Luo languages, languages spoken by the Luo peoples
  - Lango language (Uganda), a Western Nilotic language of the Luo languages
- Lviv Danylo Halytskyi International Airport, Ukraine (IATA code)

== See also ==
- Luo (disambiguation)
