= Wan'an Subdistrict, Quanzhou =

Wan'an Subdistrict 万安街道
- Subdistrict
- Location in Fujian Wan'an Subdistrict (China)
- Coordinates: 24°57′1″N 118°40′8″E
- Country: People's Republic of China
- Province: Fujian
- Prefecture-level city: Quanzhou
- District: Luojiang District
- Time zone: UTC+8 (China Standard)

Wan'an Subdistrict (simplified Chinese: 万安街道; traditional Chinese: 萬安街道; pinyin: Wàn'ān Jiēdào) is a subdistrict in Luojiang District, Quanzhou, Fujian, China. As of 2018, it has 8 residential communities under its administration.

== See also ==
- List of township-level divisions of Fujian
