= Lua language =

Lua may refer to the following languages:

== African ==
- Luba-Kasai language (ISO 639 code: lua), a Bantu language of Central Africa
- Niellim language, also known as Lua, a Niger–Congo language of southern Chad

== Austroasiatic ==
- Lawa language, or La'wa/L'wa, a Mon–Khmer language of Thailand
- a collective term for Mon-Khmer languages of the Lua people, namely:
  - Mal language
  - Phai language

== Computing ==
- Lua, a programming language

== See also ==
- Lua (disambiguation)
- Luo language (disambiguation)
