= Luo =

Luo or LUO may refer to:

== Luo peoples and languages ==
- Luo peoples, an ethno-linguistic group of eastern and central Africa
  - Luo people of Kenya and Tanzania or Joluo, an ethnic group in western Kenya, eastern Uganda, and northern Tanzania.
    - Luoland, the tribal homeland of the group immediately above
- Luo languages, a dozen languages spoken by the Luo peoples
  - Luo language (Kenya and Tanzania) or Dholuo
  - Southern Luo, a dialect cluster of Uganda and neighboring countries
- Luo language (Cameroon), a nearly extinct language of Cameroon - not associated with Luo languages above

== People ==
- Luo (surname) (羅), Chinese surname
- Luò (surname) (駱), Chinese surname
- Jing Jing Luo, Chinese composer
- Luo Changqing, killed in the 2019 Hong Kong protests
- Michael Luo (born 1976), American journalist
- Show Lo (born 1979), Taiwanese singer, dancer and actor

== Geography ==
- Luo (state), a Chinese feudal state, 11th–7th centuries B.C.
- Luo River (Henan) (洛河, Luohe), a tributary of the Yellow River, flows mostly in Henan province of China
- Luo River (Shaanxi) (洛河, Luohe), river in Shaanxi, China, second largest tributary of the Wei River
- Luo River (Fujian) (洛江, Luojiang), river in Fujian, China; flows into Quanzhou Bay of Taiwan Strait
- Luo Scientific Reserve, a protected area in the Democratic Republic of the Congo
- Luo (also Luoyi 洛邑) the ancient Zhou capital: see Luoyang

== Other uses ==
- Luo (instrument), a type of Chinese gong
- Luo, a character in the novel Balzac and the Little Chinese Seamstress by Dai Sijie

== See also ==
- LUO, the IATA abbreviation for Luena Airport in Angola
- Luo River (disambiguation)
