= Luoyang Bridge =

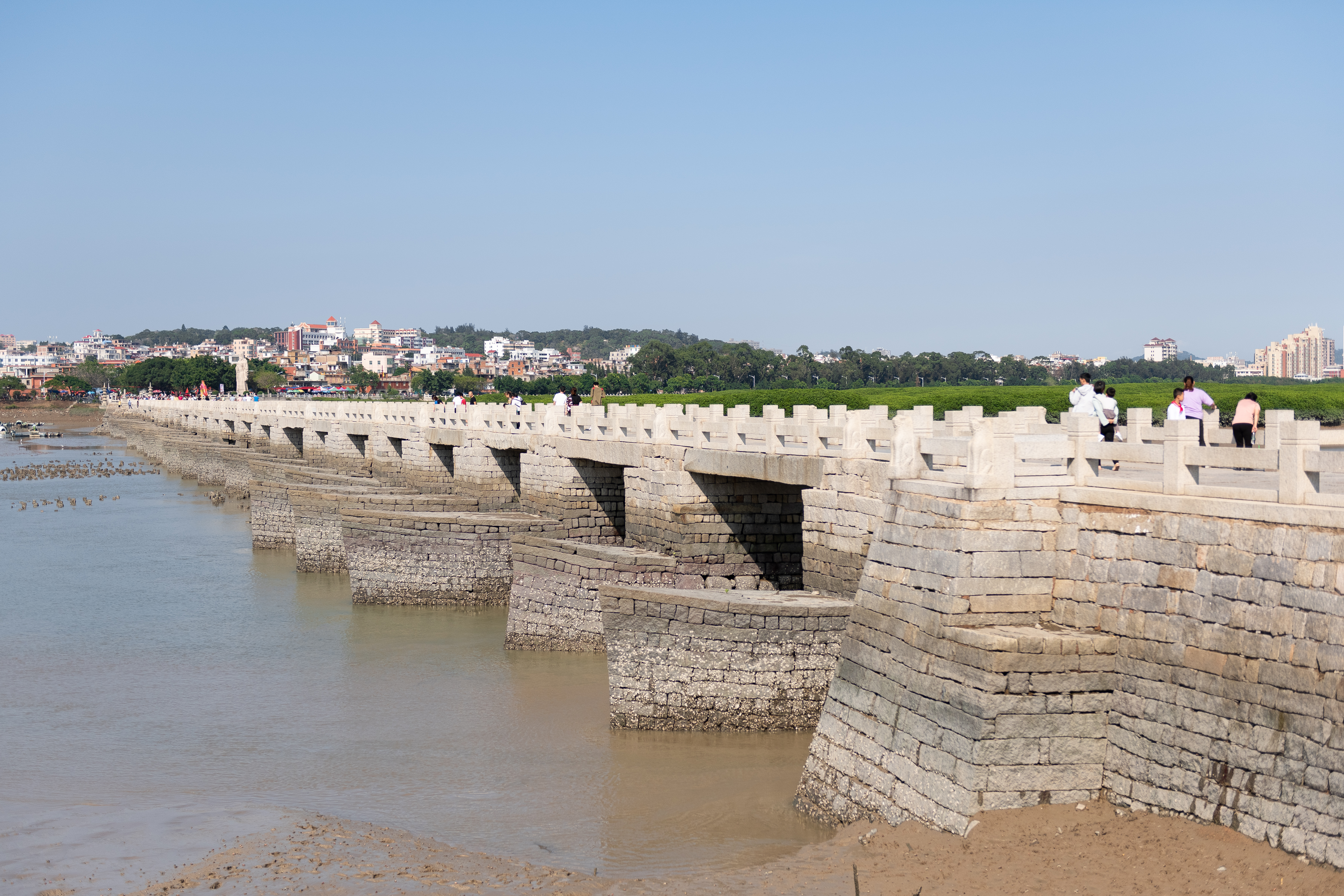
- Coordinates: 24.9545°N 118.6762°E
- Carries: China National Highway 324 (G324)
- Crosses: Luoyang River
- Locale: Quanzhou, Fujian, China
- Preceded by: pedestrian bridge
- Followed by: China National Highway 201

Characteristics
- Material: Stone
- Total length: 1.2 kilometres (0.75 mi)
- Width: 40 metres (130 ft)
- No. of spans: 46
- Design life: 1000+ years

History
- Construction start: 1058

UNESCO World Heritage Site
- Location: China
- Part of: Quanzhou: Emporium of the World in Song-Yuan China
- Criteria: Cultural: (iv)
- Reference: 1561
- Inscription: 2021 (44th Session)

Location
- Interactive map of Luoyang Bridge

Luoyang Bridge
- Traditional Chinese: 洛陽橋
- Simplified Chinese: 洛阳桥
Transcriptions
Standard Mandarin
- Hanyu Pinyin: Luòyáng qiáo
Southern Min
- Hokkien POJ: Lo̍h-iûⁿ-kiô

Alternative Chinese name
- Traditional Chinese: 萬安橋
- Simplified Chinese: 万安桥
- Literal meaning: Absolutely safe bridge
Transcriptions
Standard Mandarin
- Hanyu Pinyin: Wàn'ān qiáo

The Luoyang Bridge, also known as Wan'an Bridge, is located in Quanzhou, Fujian province, China. The stone bay bridge is situated at the mouth of Luoyang River. Being the first stone bay bridge in China, it enjoys the reputation of "one of the four ancient bridges of China".

The project started from the fifth year (1053) of Huangyou's ruling period in the Northern Song dynasty. Cai Xiang, the chief of Quanzhou prefecture in the 3rd year (1058) of Jiayou's reign, took over the task of constructing the bridge, who had overcome several difficulties concerning bridge deck pavement and bridge pier by applying a raft foundation and raising oysters in the river to strengthen the base. In the fourth year (1059) of Jiayou's reign, the construction of Luoyang bridge was completed and Cai Xiang wrote "The Wan'an bridge" for it. The bridge had been reconstructed and repaired in the later dynasties. In the Southern Song dynasty, pagodas and fengshui pagodas were built outside the guardrail of the bridge.

The surviving bridge is 834 metres long and 7 metres wide, and has 46 piers in total. The north part of the bridge is in the territory of Hui'an County while the south is in Luojiang District. The middle part is located in a river island called Zhongzhou. Pagodas and tower joss can be found both on the bridge and Zhongzhou island.

Luoyang bridge was listed as a key cultural relics unit under the national protection in 1988. In 2021, the bridge was inscribed on the UNESCO World Heritage List along with other Song and Yuan dynasty sites around Quanzhou because of its importance to medieval maritime trade in China and the exchange of cultures and ideas around the world.

== History ==
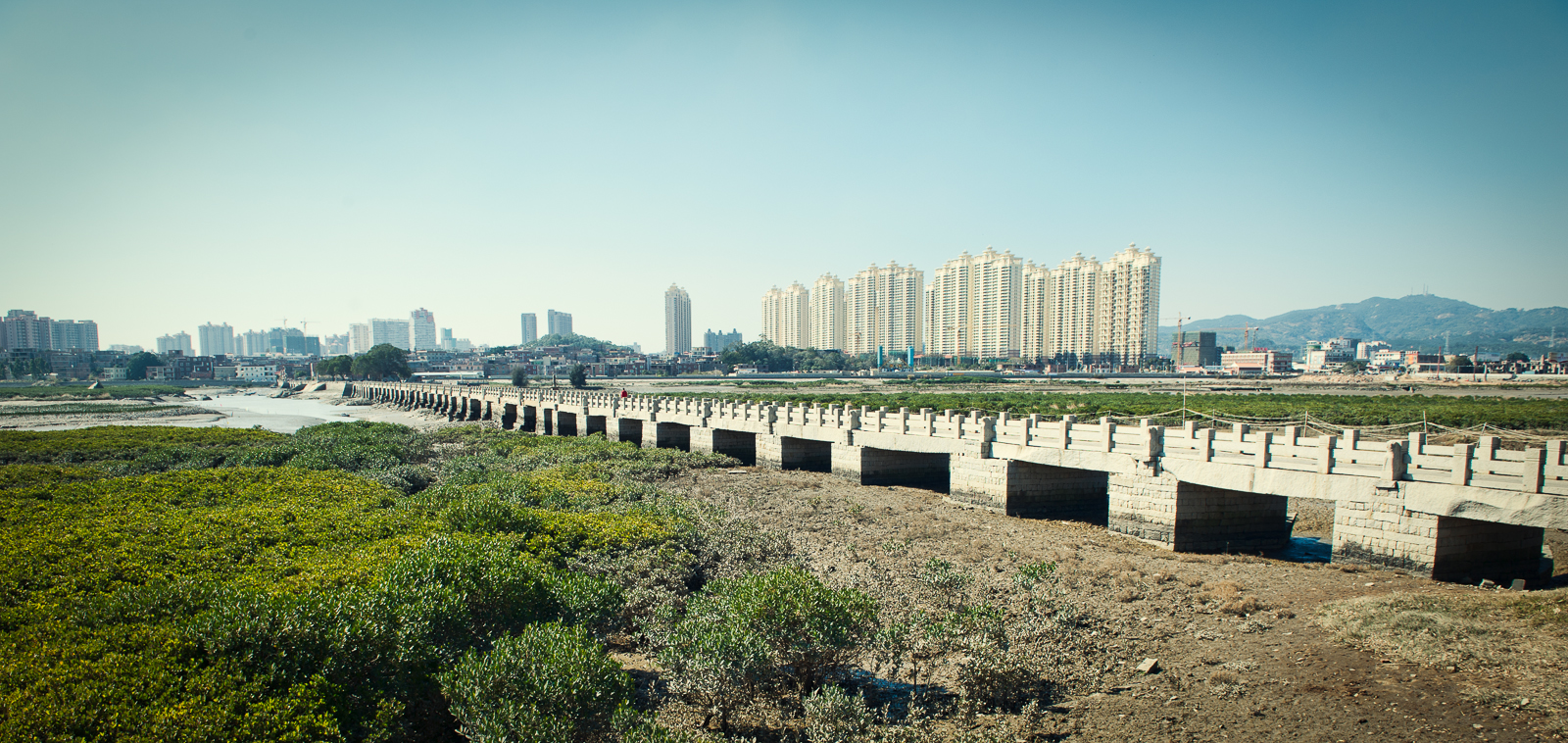
The panoramic view of Luoyang bridge

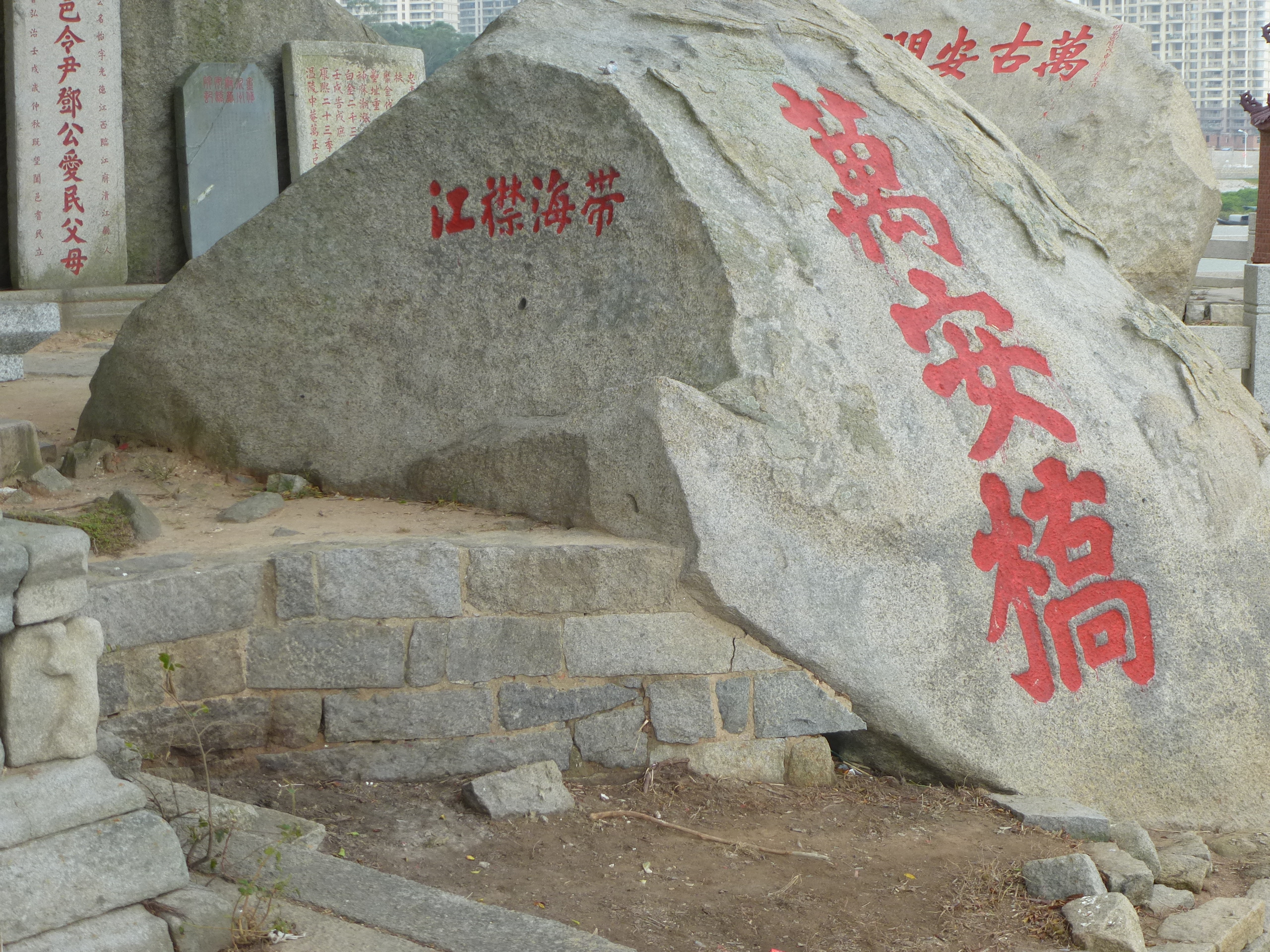
Stone carving on Luoyang bridge

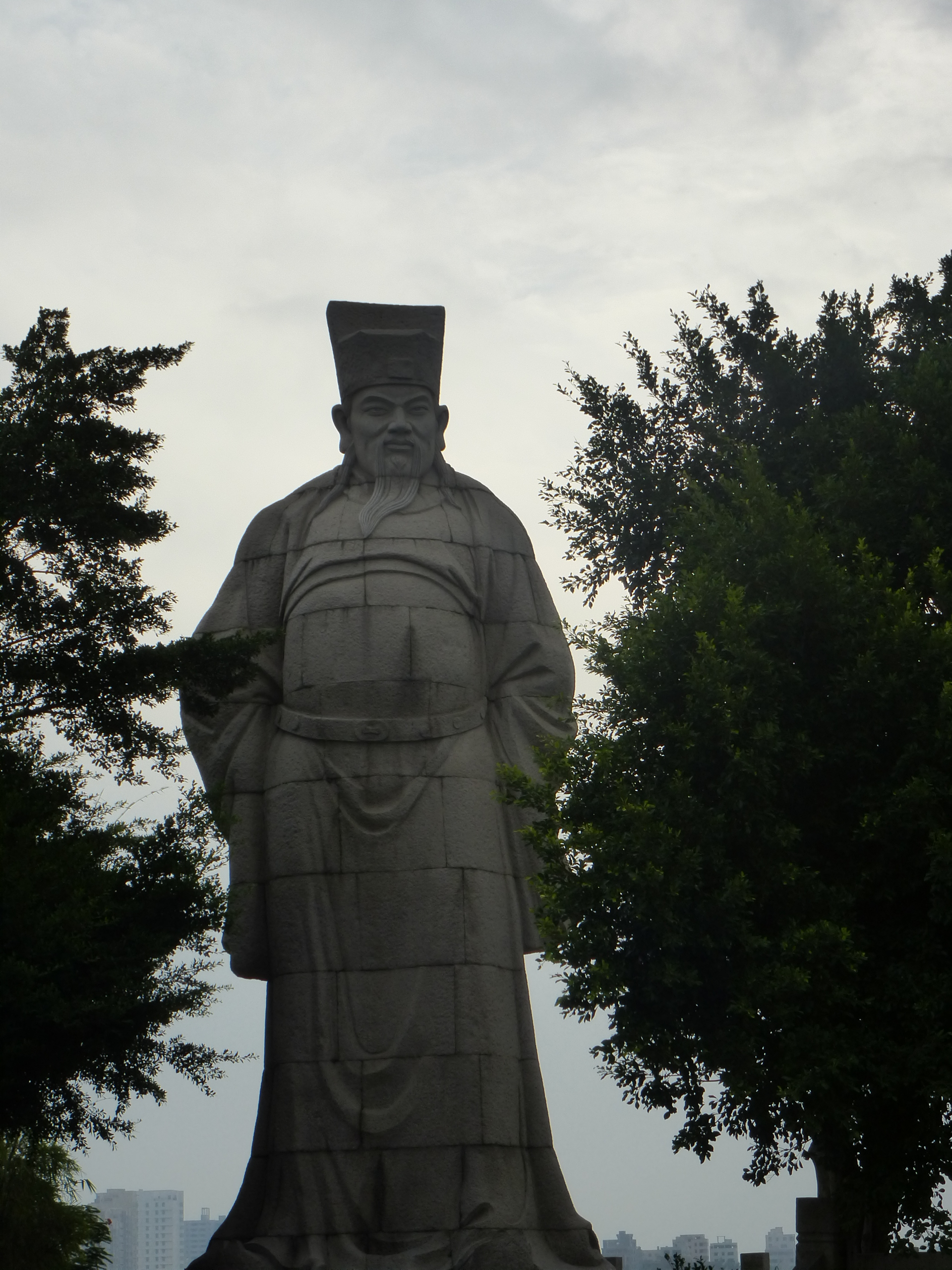
The stone sculpture of Cai Xiang

Luoyang bridge, also known as Wan'an bridge, is named for being situated on the Luoyang river. Legend has it that in the Tang dynasty, emperor Xuanzong of Tang disguised himself and went to the street to inspect people's lives. He stopped by a river in north-west hui'an county, Quanzhou, and claimed the scenery by the river was somewhat similar to what he saw in Luoyang. Therefore, the river has been called Luoyang river ever since.

Before it was built, there was a ferry crossing called Wan'an to help locals cross the river. The ferry was in the estuary, and accidents frequently resulted from harsh winds and high seas, and crossings were impossible for several days. During the reign of Qingli in northern Song dynasty, one of the Quanzhou locals, Lichong, used stones as piers and wood as deck to build a floating bridge to help passersby cross the river; however, it was destroyed by water more than once. In the fifth year (1053) of Huangyou's reign, another Quanzhou local, Wangshi, capped and fixed the floating bridge, which was the starting point of constructing Luoyang bridge officially. During the construction, they encountered many problems including the lack of funds, the extreme difficulty of building seven of the bridge piers and the deck.

In the July of the 3rd year (1058) of Jiayou's reign, Cai Xiang was appointed as the chief of the Quanzhou prefecture, and then he actively participated in the construction of the bridge. He called on donation, cultured oysters to fix the piers, and took advantage of the ebb and flow to successfully build the deck. In the December of the 4th year (1059) of Jiayou's reign, the construction was completed, and Cai Xiang wrote "The Wan'an bridge" to memorialize it. Luoyang bridge became the first bay bridge in Chinese history. From the northern song dynasty to contemporary times, eight pagodas and fengshui towers have been built around Luoyang bridge.

According to records, Luoyang bridge had been repaired and maintained 17 times from its completion to 1993, among which the one made in the 8th year (1138) of Shaoxing's reign in southern Song dynasty was the first. In the 6th year (1408) of Yongle in Ming dynasty and the 4th year (1453) of Jingtai, the bridge went through reconstruction. In Jiajing's reign of Ming dynasty, barracks were built on the Zhongzhou island, the middle part of Luoyang bridge, to resist Japanese pirates.

The bridge survived unscathed a major earthquake in the 32nd year (1604) of Wanli in Ming dynasty.

During Chongzhen's reign, Japanese pirates almost disappeared, and a pavilion was built on the old barracks, which was named "Jinghong pavilion" (rainbow in the mirror).

In the 20th year of Qing emperor Kangxi's reign (1681), in the eighth year of Yongzheng's reign (1761) and the 23rd year of Daoguang (1843), the bridge was damaged and was repaired. In the 10th year of Xianfeng (1860), attempts were made to carry out further repairs. The 19th Route Army, who were garrisoned in the Quanzhou area, reinforced the main body of the bridge in 1932, fixing piers and using steel reinforced concrete for girders and decking.

During the Sino-Japanese war, this bridge was destroyed by the Japanese army. It was repaired in 1946, but during the second Chinese civil war, the national revolutionary army destroyed the bridge again. The cultural relics were all ruined, and the only thing left was the pier. Later, the People's Republic of China spared every efforts to repair the bridge. In 1961, it was listed as one of the cultural relics unit of Fujian province. In 1974, because of the serious damage of Luoyang bridge, it was no longer capable of serving as a transporting bridge, thus the highway bureau built a new highway bridge 700 meters away from the Luoyang bridge in the upstream. Luoyang bridge officially became the passage to connect the shores of Luo river, and also a heritage bridge. It became a cultural relics unit under national protection in 1988. In 1991, it was officially listed as a reconstruction project, which started in 1993 and completed in 1996. It was selected as one of the cultural world heritage along the maritime silkroad in 2009.

== Structure ==
=== The structure of the main body ===
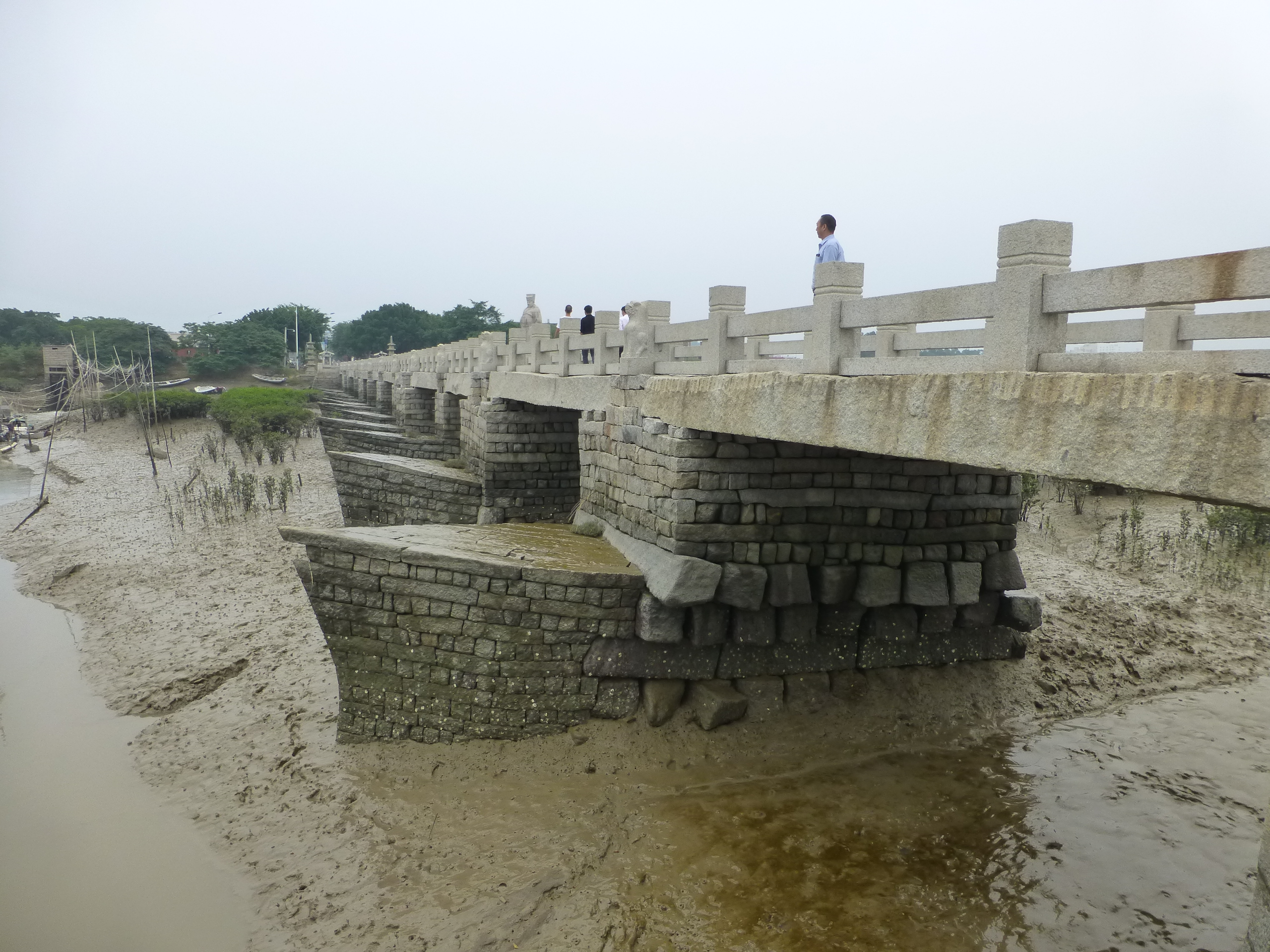
"Raft foundation" in the upstream of Luoyang Bridge pier

Luoyang bridge, located in the mouth of Luo yang river in Quanzhou, Fujian province, is a stone bay bridge. It has north–south orientation, extending from the dyke made of stones, passing an island called "Zhongzhou" in the middle of the river, and entering Luojiang district in its south end. It is 731.29 meters in length. The south side bridge approach is 80.5 meters long, 7 meters wide. The north side bow bridge is 11 meters long, 7 meters wide, and the main deck is 5 meters wide. There are 47 apertures and 46 piers. Piers are built up by boulder strips. The boulder strips on the top two levels extend to both right side and left side in order to reduce the span of the slabstone. Cutwater can be found in the upstream of the pier bottom, whose sharp end is slightly cocking-up, a "raft foundation". The bridge plate is made of large-scale boulder strips. Back to the ancient time, the engineer took the advantage of ebbs to successfully build the plate. On both sides of the plate, there are 500 stone guardrails to protect passers-by from falling into the river.

=== Subsidiary buildings ===
==== The stone tower ====
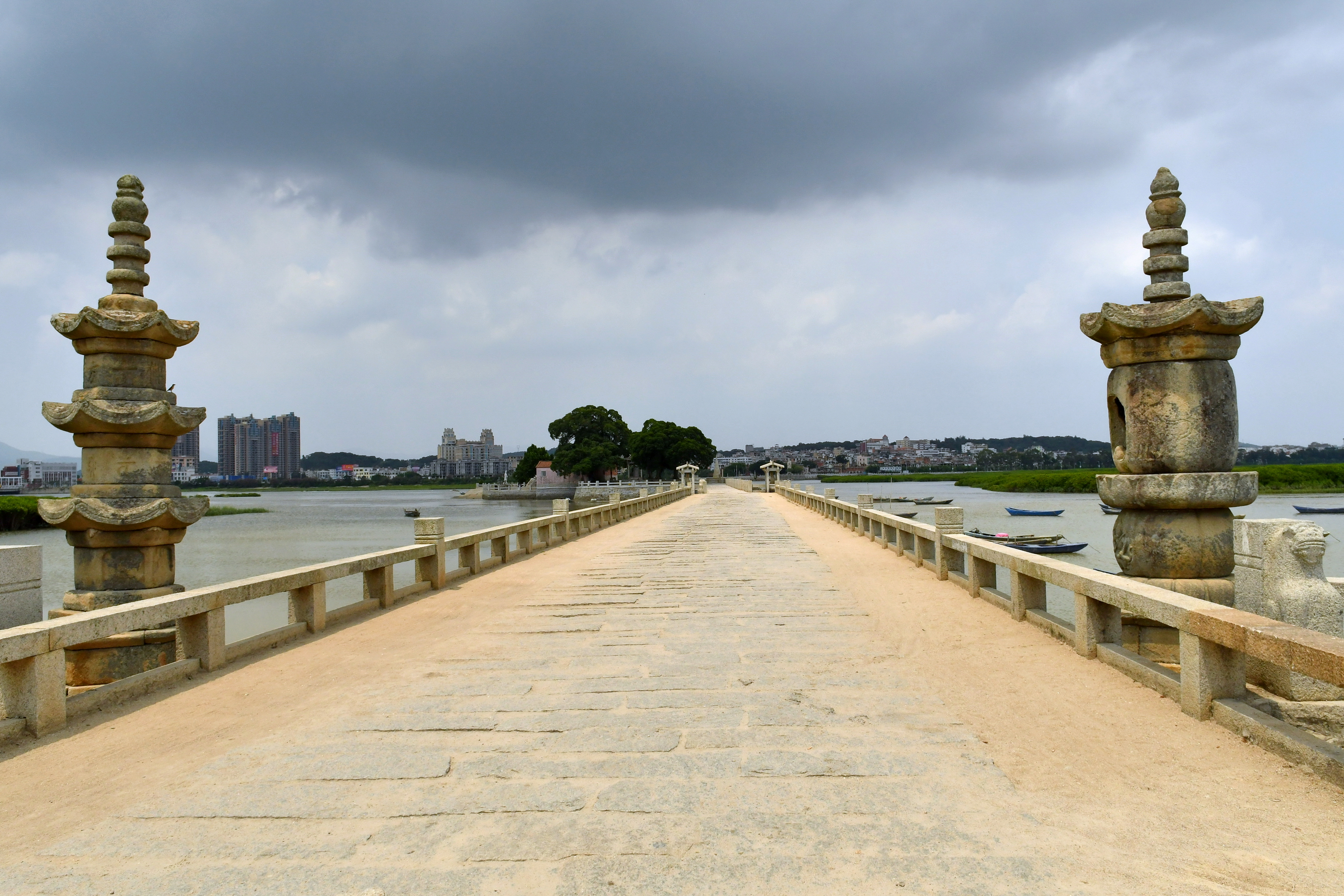
Luoyang Bridge south side

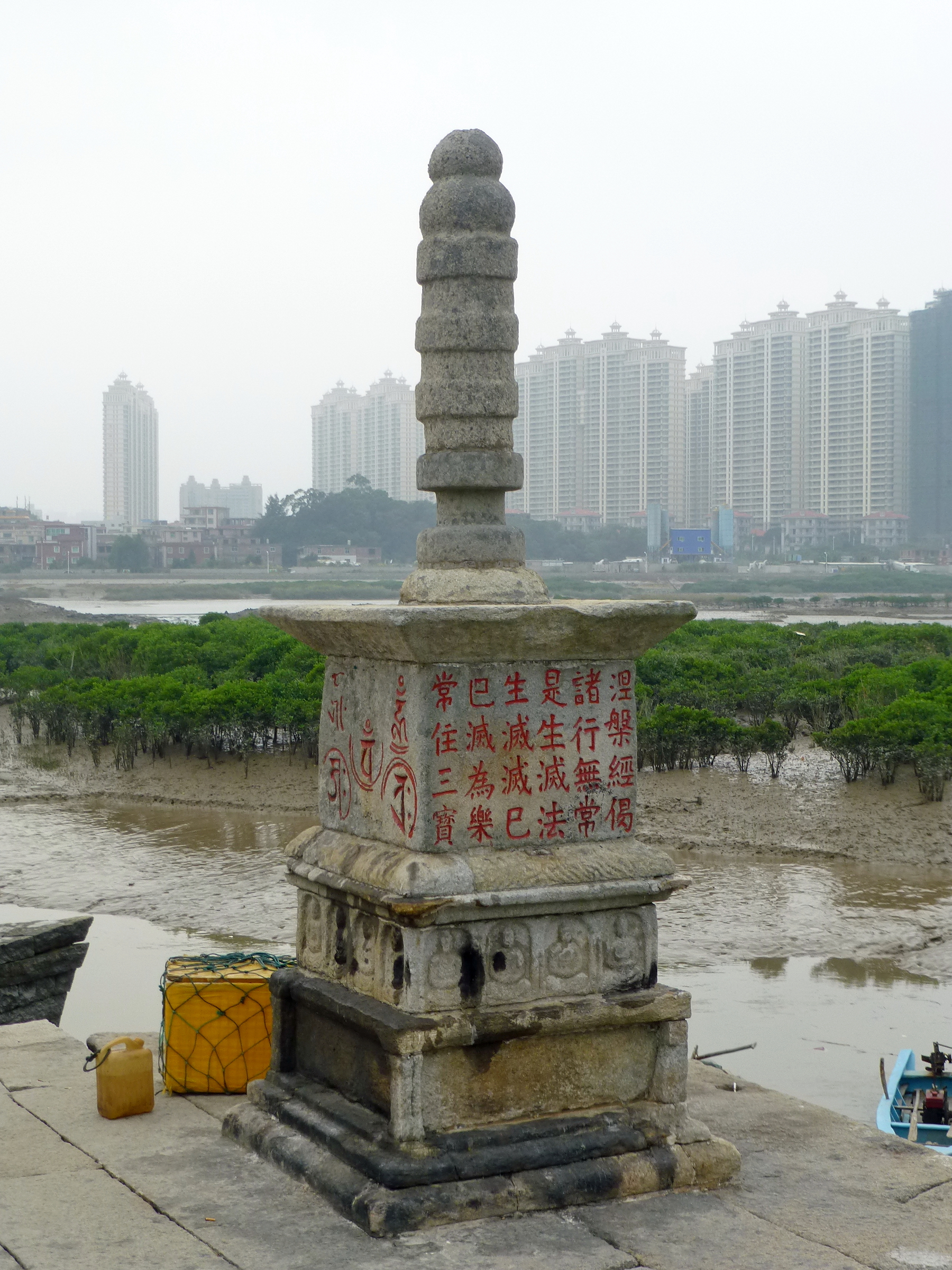
Moonlight Buddha Tower

There are 7 stone towers outside the guardrails of the bridge, among which 3 are pagodas of multi-storied pavilion type, 1 Baoqie Sutra-printing house, 1 Five wheel tower, 1 Jing Zhuang, 1 Zheng feng tower (repress the wind), and 1 foundation base. From south to north, these 7 towers are:

- On the east side of the south end, there is a stupa style pagoda, which is 5 meters high, with a square foundation base, a round tower body. A niche door opens in its south side, and one relief sculpture of diamond guard can be found on both sides. A hexagon turret cover can be found on the guards, which has a 3-layer wheel and a Sarah on the top.
- On the west side of the north end, there is a 3-stored hexagon solid pagoda, which has a square foundation made of boulder strips and 2.6 meters long on each side of the foundation. The pedestal is equilateral hexagon. On each side of the first layer of the tower body, there is a Buddha sculpture; the six word mantra tantra on the second; and a carving letter of "Fo" (Buddha) on the east side, and "Shi, Fang, San, Shi, Yiqie" on other sides. Thatsa can be found on the top of the tower, below which there are covered bowl, wheel, and Sarah.
- On the south side of the atrium bridge in Zhengzhou island, there is a 3-meter high Zhenfeng tower, whose body is a cone shape with no sculpture on it. A monument said "Zhenfeng tower on Luoyang bridge" is on one side of the tower.
- On the northwest side of Zhongzhou island, a square Baoqie sutra-printing pagoda is built in the jointing place of the island and the bridge. The relief sculpture of mountains, rivers, plants and gods is on its foundation base. On 4 sides of the tower, there is a sculpture of the Buddha, whose shape and structure is almost the same as the "Moonlight Buddha tower" depicted in the following section.
- To the north of the Zhengzhou island, on the pier of the middle part of the bridge, there stands a Baoqie sutra-printing pagoda, which is 3.64 meters high and has a square base of 0.95 meters long on each side. The tower is 2-storied. On the first level, there is a sitting Buddha on 4 sides of the tower. The upper store is relatively high and far from the ground. In its direction of facing the river, a Buddha head is carved on the tower, and on the left and right sides of the head sculptured "moonlight Buddha" and "built in the year of Jihai". It is the only tower on Luoyang bridge which has the indication of the founding time and year. Archaeologists confirm that the tower was built in the 4th year (1059) of Jiayou in northern song dynasty according to its sculpturing style. A 1.6-meter high thatsa is above the tower, below which there are covered bowl, wheel, and Sarah.
- On the north end of the bridge, there are two 5-stored octagonal solid stone pagodas on each side of the bridge, with the same shape, structure and sculptures. They are around 6 meters high, and have a square base made of boulder strips. The foundation of the tower is equilateral octagonal shape, each of the turret cover is hexagon shape with the sculpture of bricks and hooks. On the due south, west, east and north side of each layer, there is a sitting Buddha relief sculpture. The Thatsa was built in later years, which is a cone shape and with no wheel.

==== Joss ====
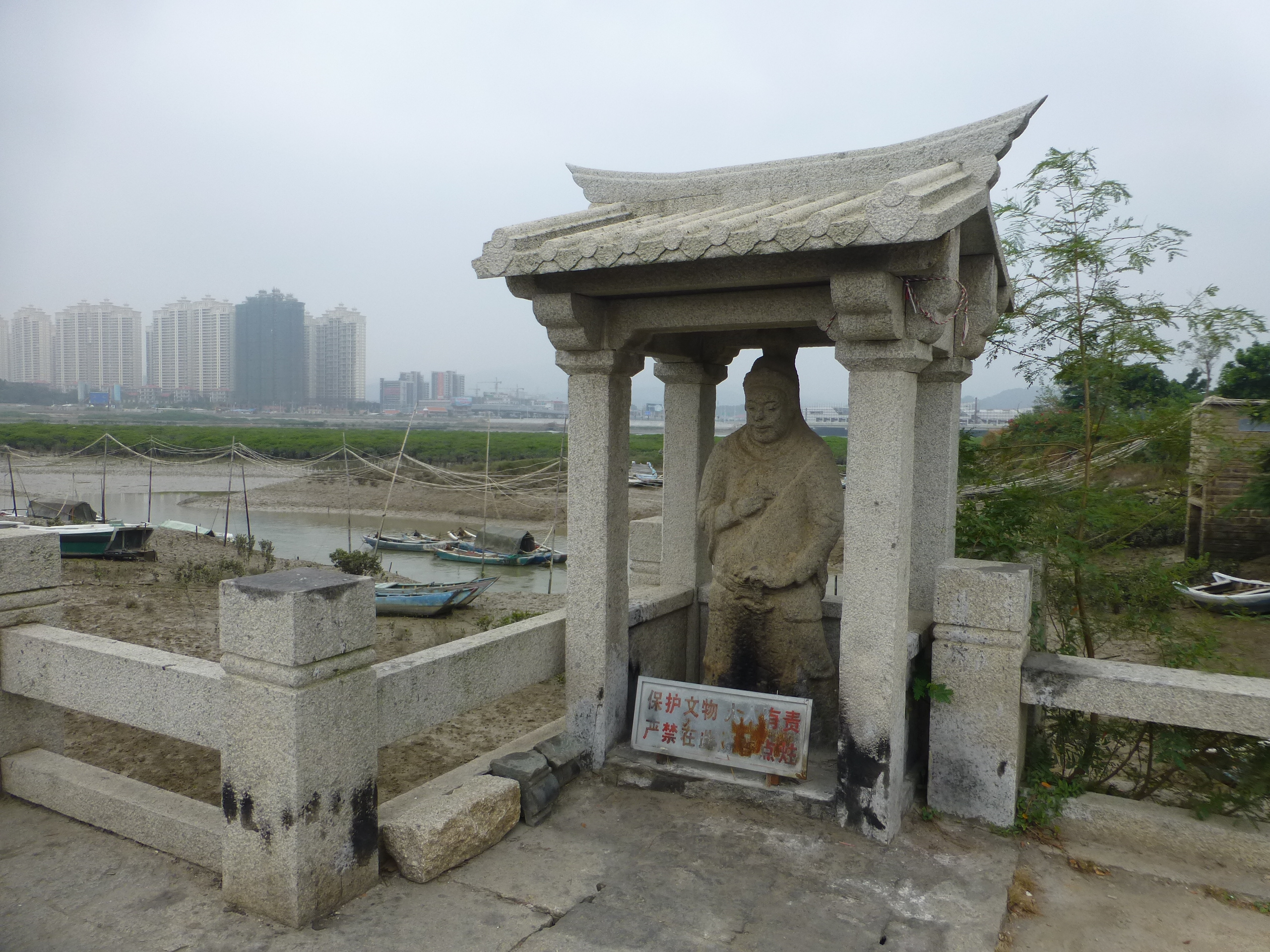
joss protecting the bridge on each end.

On the south end and the north end of Luoyang bridge, there are 2 stone joss protecting the bridge on each end. The joss is 1.63 meters high, facing each other, and they were all built during the northern song dynasty. Those sculptures all have Han nationality (the majority group of people in China), wearing hamlet and armor, holding long sword in hands.

==== Bridge pavilion ====
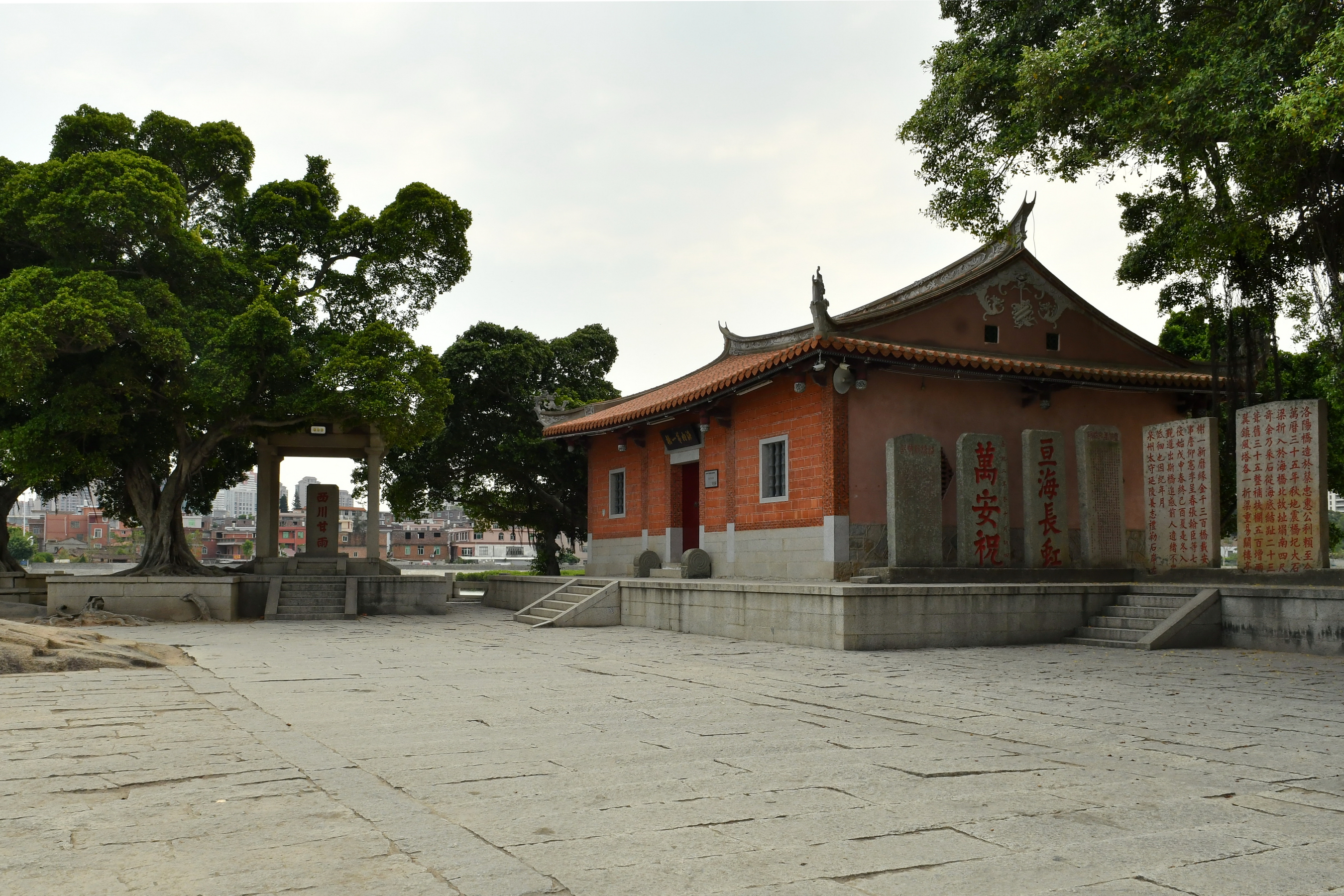
Luoyang Bridge Zhongzhou island

There are two stone pavilions on Zhongzhou island. One is called "Zhongting" (the middle pavilion), a foursquare pavilion located in the north side of Zhongzhou island. The exact year of its building is unable to verify. The existing pavilion is, in fact, reconstructed on the basis of the body in the late Qing and early Ming dynasty, after the founding of the People's Republic of China. The other pavilion is called "Xi chuan sweet rain pavilion", built to commemorate the magistrate of Jinjiang county, Fang Ke, in Ming dynasty. Folklore has it that Fang's prayer for rain came true, then folks built this pavilion to commemorate him.

==== Memorial architecture ====
An ancestral temple to commemorate Cai Zhonghui can be found 500 meters away from the south end of the bridge, which was built by descendants to remember Cai's contribution to build Luoyang bridge. This temple started construction in northern song dynasty, and the existing one is in the architectural style of Qing dynasty, which is oriented north and south and have 3 halls with 3 rooms. Zhaohui temple is built in the north side of the bridge, and the existing temple is also in Qing style. It has 2 halls with 5 rooms. The exact year when the temple started to build is lost track, but archaeologists assume its predecessor is Zhenhai nunnery and then changed its name to Zhaohui temple. On the south end of the bridge, there are many sculptures made during the construction process, including the famous "Wan'an bridge", which has 153 letters on the 3-meter high and 1.5-meter wide stone monument. Besides, 26 monuments with carvings, which are from different periods of the bridge construction can be found in the north side of the bridge, Zhongzhou island and south side.

== Conservation ==
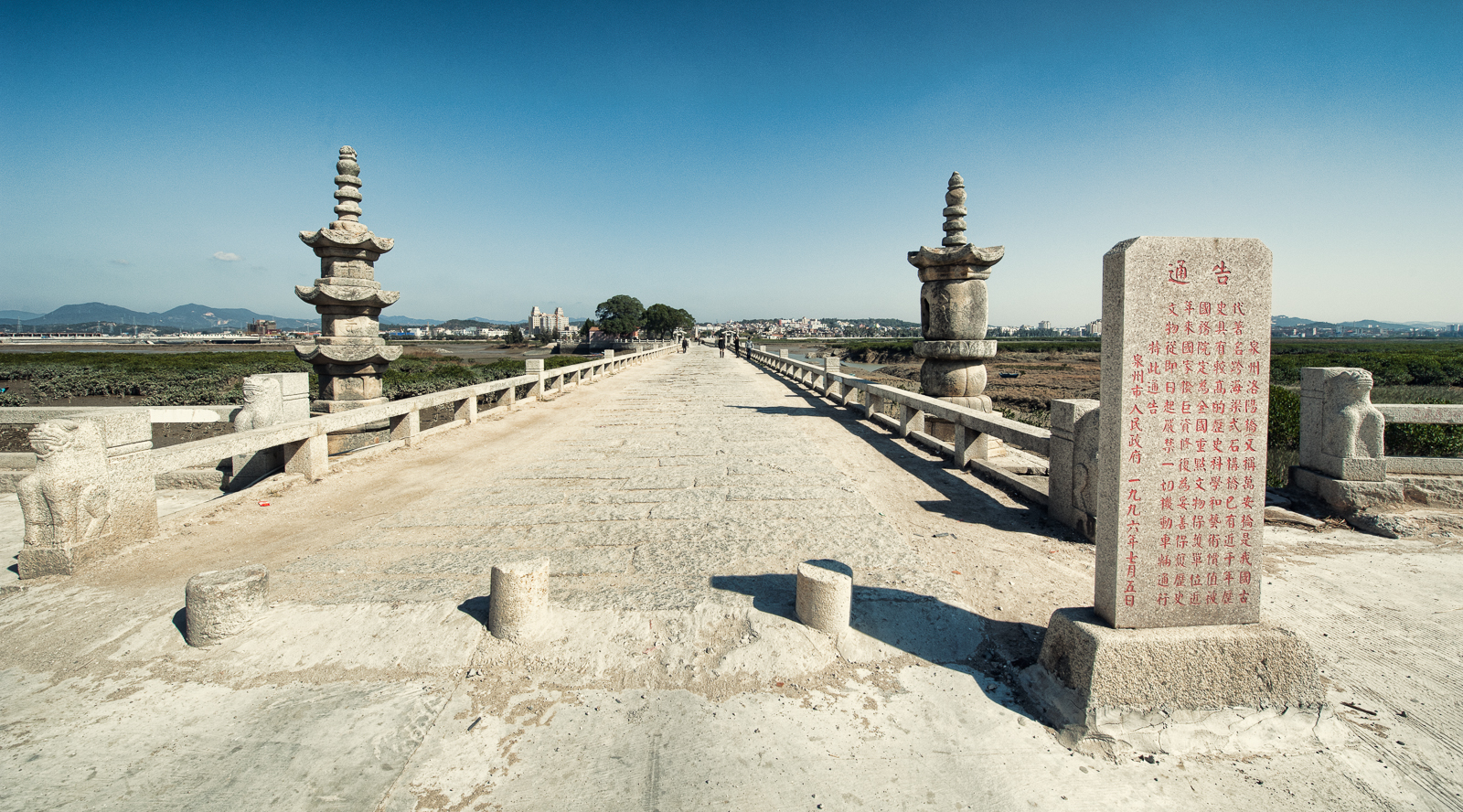
The stone sculpture of Cai Xiang

Food stalls and restaurants are everywhere on the bridge plate and on both sides of the bridge. Dinning-tables were put on the north and south side of the bridge back in 2005. In 2006, some people ignored the rule and made food stalls inside the pavilion which stands in the center of Luoyang bridge. The waste came from cooking might have damaged the stone bridge, thus municipal law enforcement department took action and changed the situation by removing the stalls. In 2010, some residents living in nearby villages tried to build a buddha temple without the government permission, which is forced to stop by government. Few months later, these residents tried again to build a stone buddha sculpture in the south end of the bridge, still with no permission of the government.

In 2008, severe deposition and piles of wastes in both river ways had affected the fishermen's life, and also raised the tension in terms of conservation of the bridge. Quanzhou municipal government planned to invest 7 million RMB to tackle this problem, improving the environment and clearing the river way. In 2015, a large number of mangrove had grown on the coastline and extended to the areas around Luoyang bridge. Then a debate went on to discuss whether the mangrove would have a bad impact on Luoyang bridge. The culture relics management office organized a team to cut down the 30 trees growing around the bridge. In November 2016, the plan of improving the environment around Luoyang bridge officially submitted to national culture relics bureau, and most parts of the plan got approval in December, expect the part for dredging.

== See also ==
- List of bridges in China
