= LuaLua =

Lualua can refer to

== People ==
- Lomana LuaLua, a Zaire-born Congo DR international footballer who plays for Cypriot club Merit Alsancak Yeşilova
- Kazenga LuaLua, younger brother of Lomana, plays for Luton Town

== Other ==
- Lualua (ship), also known as fou-lualua or foulua, a Samoan voyaging catamaran
