= Luojiang, Quanzhou =

Luojiang 洛江区
- District
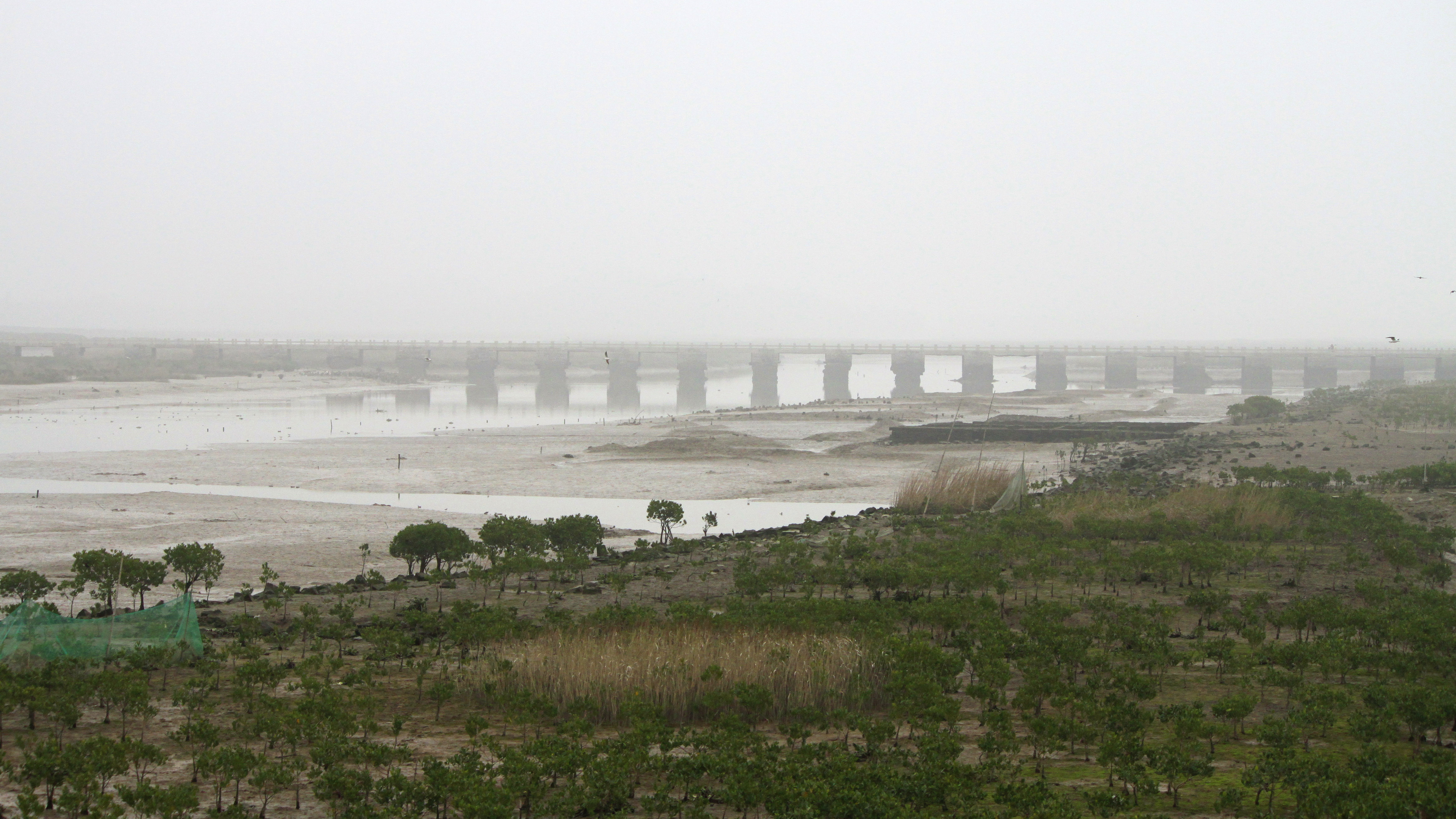
- Luoyang Bridge over the estuary of the Luo River

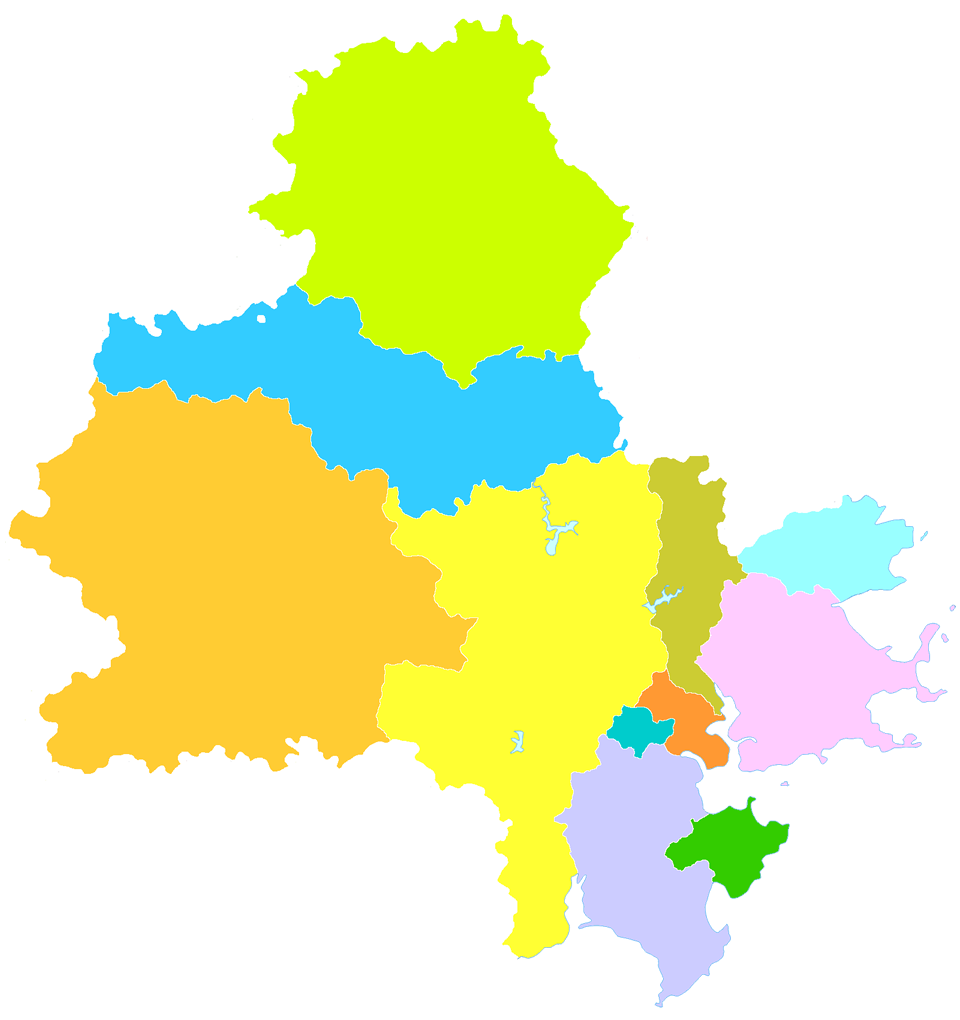
- Luojiang District (olive green) in Quanzhou

- Location in Fujian
- Coordinates: 24°56′40″N 118°40′11″E
- Country: People's Republic of China
- Province: Fujian
- Prefecture-level city: Quanzhou

Area
  - Total: 371.9 km^{2} (143.6 sq mi)

Population (2020 census)
  - Total: 247,172
  - Density: 664.6/km^{2} (1,721/sq mi)
- Time zone: UTC+8 (China Standard)

Luojiang District (Chinese: 洛江; pinyin: Luòjiāng; Pe̍h-ōe-jī: Lo̍k-kang) is a district of Quanzhou, southern Fujian province, People's Republic of China.

== Administrative divisions ==
Subdistricts:

- Wan'an Subdistrict (万安街道), Shuangyang Subdistrict (双阳街道)

Towns:

- Heshi (河市镇), Majia (马甲镇), Luoxi (罗溪镇)

The only township is Hongshan Township (虹山乡)
