= Luoyang River =

River in Fujian, China

Coordinates: 25.013°N 118.635°E

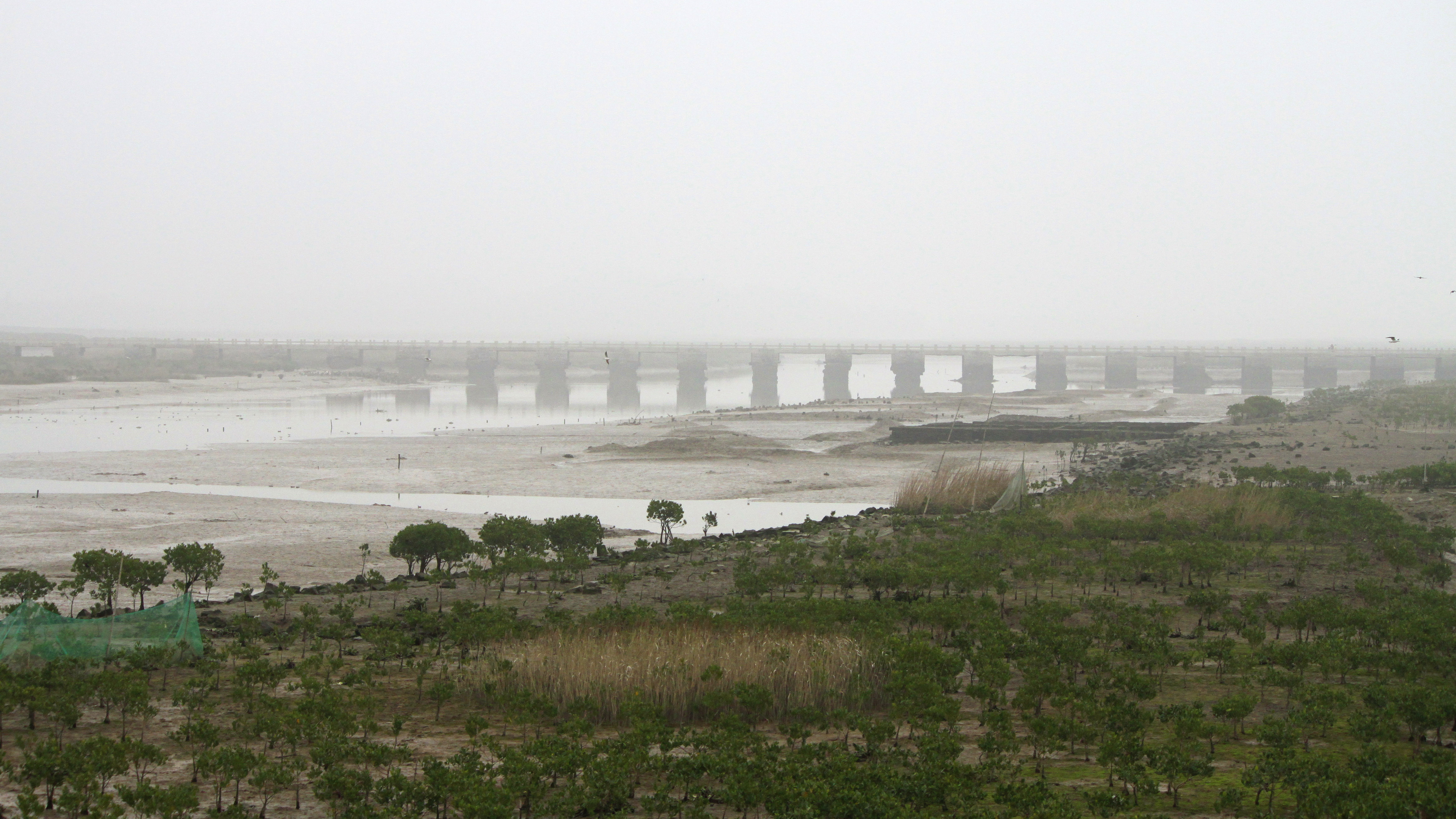
- The Luoyang Bridge across the Luo in Quanzhou
- Traditional Chinese: 洛陽江
- Simplified Chinese: 洛阳江
Transcriptions
Standard Mandarin
- Hanyu Pinyin: Luòyángjiāng
Southern Min
- Hokkien POJ: Lo̍k-iông-kang

The Luoyang River, or Luoyang Jiang, is a river in Quanzhou in Fujian, China. It flows in the general southern direction and forms a long and wide estuary as it enters Quanzhou Bay on the Taiwan Strait. The estuary separates Quanzhou's Luojiang and Fengze districts on its western shore from Hui'an County to its east.

The Luoyang River estuary is spanned by the ancient Luoyang Bridge, as well as by several modern bridges.

Oysters have been traditionally cultivated in the Luo River estuary.

== See also ==
- Other Luo Rivers
- Other Luojiangs
- List of rivers in China
