= Poetry of Mao Zedong =

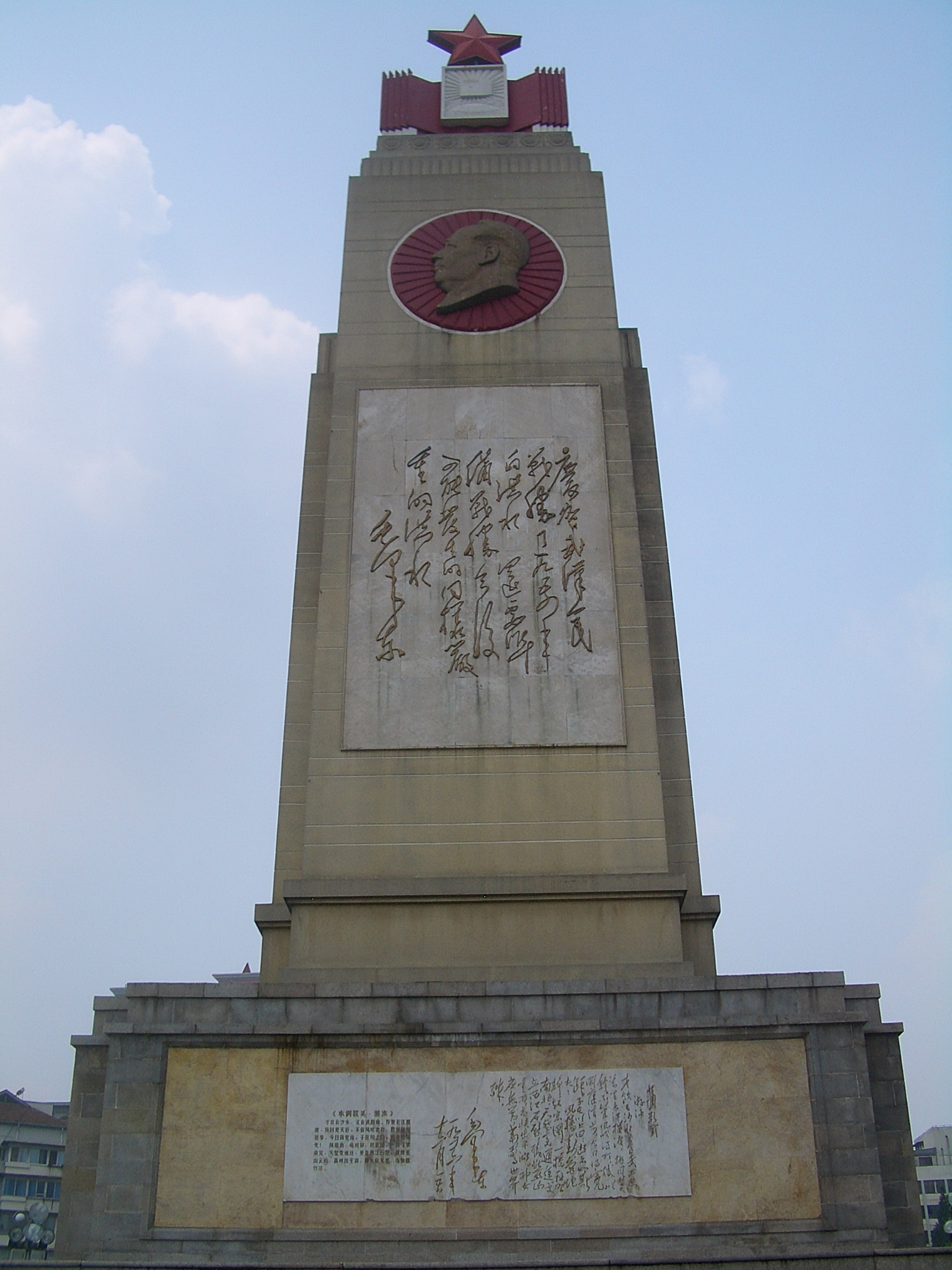
Mao Zedong's poem "Shuidiao Getou – Swimming" (《水调歌头·游泳》, 1956) on the pedestal of the 1954 Flood Monument in Wuhan (built 1969)

Mao Zedong (1893–1976), the first Chairman of the Chinese Communist Party and leader of the People's Republic of China for nearly 30 years, wrote poetry, starting in the 1920s, during the Chinese Red Army's retreat during the Long March of 1934–1936, and after coming to power in 1949 following the Chinese Civil War. In spite of Mao's political radicalism he was artistically conservative, opting to use traditional Chinese forms.

== Overview ==
Mao's poems are in the classical Chinese verse styles, most commonly Ci and Lü, rather than newer Modern Chinese poetry styles. Like most Chinese intellectuals of his generation, Mao immersed himself in Chinese classical literature. His style was deeply influenced by the "Three Lis" of the Tang dynasty: poets Li Bai, Li Shangyin, and Li He. He is considered to be a romantic poet, in contrast to the realist poets represented by Du Fu.

Mao's poems are frequently quoted in popular culture, literature and daily conversations. Some of his most well-known poems are "Snow" (1936.02), "Changsha" (1925), "The Double Ninth" (1929.10), "Loushan Pass" (1935), "The Long March" (1935), "The PLA Captures Nanjing" (1949.04), "Reply to Li Shuyi" (1957.05.11), and "Ode to the Plum Blossom" (1961.12).

Themes in Mao's poetry include frequent use of the character 万 (wan), meaning 10,000 (and in the Chinese literary tradition, not necessarily the specific number but standing for something huge and plentiful). The character appears in various lines in his romantic revolutionary poetry such as "I see ten thousand crimsoned hills", "Ten thousand miles of whirling snow", an "Under the freezing sky ten thousand creatures contend in freedom".

== Poems ==
=== Changsha (1925) ===
Informal Translation: Changsha In the (rhyme) pattern of Qinyuanchun

沁園春·長沙
現代-毛澤東
獨立寒秋，湘江北去，橘子洲頭。
看萬山紅遍，層林盡染；漫江碧透，百舸爭流。
鷹擊長空，魚翔淺底，萬類霜天競自由。
悵寥廓，問蒼茫大地，誰主沉浮？

攜來百侶曾遊，憶往昔崢嶸歲月稠。
恰同學少年，風華正茂；書生意氣，揮斥方遒。
指點江山，激揚文字，糞土當年萬戶侯。
曾記否，到中流擊水，浪遏飛舟！

In the autumn cold alone I stand
As Northward the Xiang river flow;
Upon the tip of Orange Island.
Ten thousand hills in a crimson glow
By their serried woods deep-dyed,
Hundreds of barges row upon row
Over crystal clear waters they slide.
High in the Heavens, Eagles sweep and soar
In the limpid deep, fish glance and glide;
Milliards of creatures fight to be free,
Under the frosty skies, cold to the core.
Into the boundless void, I despair,
To this vast realm I implore upon thee,
The fate of this land is in whose care?

I was here with a throng of peers
Vivid yet those eventful months and years.
Schoolmates, young as we were,
At life's full blossoming, our destinies we fulfill;
Scholars we were, of spirit and will
Carefree with youthful vigour
We point to our rivers and hills,
Praise and denounce with our lettering skills,
We cared not for fortune nor fame!
Remember the time if you could,
How in the midstream torrent we stood
And thus the speeding boats we did tame?

Orange Island is an island in the middle of Xiang River, in Changsha, the capital of Hunan province. Mao attended Hunan First Normal University around 1912–1917.

=== Yellow Crane Tower (1927) ===
Yellow Crane Tower, a building at the bank of Yangtze River in Wuhan, is very famous in Chinese history and literary tradition. It is one of the Four Great Towers of China. Its fame mainly comes from one of 300 poems produced in an anthology by Cui Hao in the early Tang dynasty, which goes as follows:

唐詩三百首·黃鶴樓
唐朝-崔顥
昔人已乘黃鶴去，此地空餘黃鶴樓。
黃鶴一去不復返，白雲千載空悠悠。
晴川歷歷漢陽樹，芳草萋萋鸚鵡洲。
日暮鄉關何處是？煙波江上使人愁。

The yellow crane has long since gone away,
All that here remains is Yellow Crane Tower.
The yellow crane once gone does not return,
White clouds drift slowly for a thousand years.

Mao wrote his poem in 1927 at Tortoise Mountain in Wuhan, following the failure of the Autumn Harvest Uprising. Mao later discussed the historical context of this poem's writing: "At that time, the Great Revolution failed, I was very depressed and didn't know what to do, so I wrote this poem".

菩薩蠻·黃鶴樓
現代-毛澤東
茫茫九派流中國，沈沈一線穿南北。
煙雨莽蒼蒼，龜蛇鎖大江。
黃鶴知何去？剩有遊人處。
把酒酹滔滔，心潮逐浪高！

China is vague and immense where the nine rivers pour.
The horizon is a deep line threading north and south.
Blue haze and rain.
Hills like a snake or tortoise guard the river.

The yellow crane is gone.
Where?
Now this tower and region are for the wanderer.
I drink wine to the bubbling water - the heroes are gone.
Like a tidal wave a wonder rises in my heart.

Alternate translation:
Vast and wide flow the nine streams through the realm headlong
Dark and dim from south to north tracks steam strong.
In the thick haze of the misty rain, the way ahead blurred and obscured
The Giant Tortoise and Mighty Serpent has the Great River stocked and secured.

The Yellow Crane has long taken flight, who knows to whither?
The Tower hath since stood alone for guests to come hither.
As I pour my wine to the raging torrent flow,
My blood wells with the waves as my heart gleam and glow!

=== Jinggang Mountain (1928) ===
This poem was written in the Jinggang Mountains, where Mao organized a Red Army to fight KMT forces after 1927. Jinggang Mountains is a mountain area at the border of Jiangxi province and Hunan province. It is there Mao began to experiment his theory of guerrilla war. He was quoted as: "When we can beat the enemy, we fight. When we can't beat them, we run".

西江月·井岡山
現代-毛澤東
山下旌旗在望，山頭鼓角相聞。
敵軍圍睏萬仟重，我自巋然不動。
早已森嚴壁壘，更加衆誌成城。
黃洋界上炮聲隆，報道敵軍宵遁。

Below the hills, our flags and banners fly
Above the hilltops, our bugles and drums cry.
Our foe besiege us in their thousands, they advance at us headlong,
Steadfast like stone, we solidly stand strong
Impregnable are our defences, already we dread nought,
Now our wills unite, stubborn like our fort.
Upon Huangyang Jie, guns boom with thunderous might,
Word comes the enemy has fled into the night.

Huangyangjie is the place where the Red Army beat the KMT army after a fierce battle.

=== The Warlords Clash (1929) ===
In 1929, Mao's Red Army left Jinggang Mountains and marched eastward to the western part of Fujian province and built their base there.

Line 3-4:

The warlords are clashing anew --
Yet another Millet Dream.

In 1929 Chiang Kai-shek's KMT army began war with Feng Yuxiang and Yan Xishan's armies in north China. That's why Mao said "the warlords are clashing anew", and "Millet Dream" meant Jiang, Feng and Yan's ambitions were just dreams. And Mao thought he could take this opportunity to his advantage when most of KMT army went to fight elsewhere.

Line 5-6 : Ting River is a river in Fujian, both Longyan and Shanghang are cities in Fujian.

=== The Double Ninth (October 1929) ===
Double Ninth Festival, also called Chongyang, is a Chinese holiday. By tradition on September 9 (Chinese Lunar Calendar) each year, Chinese people would climb to the peaks of nearby mountains, looking far away, thinking about their family members who are travelling in other places. In addition, during that day, people will drink wine made from chrysanthemum to pray for longevity. Therefore, in 1980s, Chinese government set that day as old people's day as well to call on people to respect the senior.

=== New Year's Day (January 1930) ===
Line 1: Ninghua, Qingliu, Guihua are all places in Fujian

Line 4: Wuyi Mountain is a mountain in Fujian.

=== On the Guangchang Road (February 1930) ===
Title: Guangchang is a city in Jiangxi, it was called the "North Gate" of CPC's Jiangxi Soviet.

Line 6: Gan River is a river flowing through Jiangxi.

Line 8: Ji'an is a city in Jiangxi.

=== March from Tingzhou to Changsha (July 1930) ===
Title: Tingzhou is a town in Longyan City, Fujian province, Changsha is the capital of Hunan province. At that time the Red Army tried to take Changsha, but they failed. Fujian is at the east, Hunan is at west, so Mao's army marched westward towards Nanchang. The resultant attack on Nanchang would later fail.

《蝶戀花·從汀州向長沙·毛澤東》
六月天兵征腐惡，
萬丈長纓要把鯤鵬縛。
贛水那邊紅一角，
偏師借重黃公略。

百萬工農齊踴躍，
席捲江西直搗湘和鄂。
國際悲歌歌一曲，
狂飆為我從天落。

In June our soldiers of heaven fight against evil and rot.

They have a huge rope to tie up the Kun and Peng.

On the far side of the Gan waters the ground turns red under the strategy of Huang Gonglüe.

A million workers and peasants leap up joyfully and roll up Jiangsi like a mat.

As we reach the rivers of Hunan and Hebei, we sing the Internationale. It pierces us like a whirlwind from the sky.

The poem is composed to the tune of Butterflies Courting Flowers (Chinese) by Ouyang Xiu of the Tang dynasty. Huang Gonglüe (Chinese: 黄公略) was a leader in the Red Army; he was killed in action in 1931. The poem notably invokes the name of Peng, a giant fish-turned-roc mentioned in the opening rolls of Zhuangzi as a creature with an absurd lifecycle.

=== Against the First "Encirclement" Campaign (1931) ===
During 1931-1934 Chiang Kai-shek's KMT government organized five so-called "Encirclement" campaigns on CPC's Jiangxi Soviet in Southeastern China. The first four all failed. Mao led the Red Army beating the first three campaigns, then he was relieved of leadership due to internal power struggles of the CPC. Zhou Enlai and Zhu De led the Red Army to beat the fourth campaign, but they failed the fifth time, and was forced to leave their base and began Long March.

Line 5: Zhang Huizan, the KMT general who led the first "Encirclement" Campaign. He was killed after being captured by the Red Army.

Line 10: Buzhou Mountain, a legendary mountain in Chinese forklore. It is said Buzhou Mountain was one of the four pillars supporting the sky. A giant called Gong Gong quarreled with the gods. He was very angry and banged his head against Buzhou Mountain. Buzhou Mountain was broken, thus the sky tilted and water poured from heaven, causing a huge flood on earth. Here Mao expressed his appreciation for Gong Gong's rebellious spirit.

=== Against the Second "Encirclement" Campaign (1931) ===
Source:

=== Dabodi (1933) ===
Dabodi is the site of a battle which actually took place at the beginning of 1929. The background: at that time, Mao's Red Army had left Jinggang Mountains to look for a new base. Red Army was beaten several time by the pursuing KMT army. They used up all ammunitions and were starved. Then on the New Year of 1929 they fought a desperate fight in the snow at Dabodi, using stones and bare hands, and beat their enemy. Mao revisited this place several years later and wrote this poem.

=== Huichang (1934) ===
Huichang is a city in Jiangxi, "Yue" is another name of Canton.

=== Loushan Pass (1935) ===
憶秦娥·婁山關
現代-毛澤東
西風烈，長空雁叫霜晨月。
霜晨月，馬蹄聲碎，喇叭聲咽。
雄關漫道真如鐵，而今邁步從頭越。
從頭越，蒼山如海，殘陽如血。

Fierce is the Westerly squall
Under the frosty dawn moon, wild geese utter their call
Under the frosty dawn moon
Horses' hooves clatter,
Buglers sound their horns, we remember those who fall.

Ardous as iron was our fight for Loushan Pass, mighty and vast.
Now we surmount it finally, against all odds at long last.
We surmount it finally, at long last.
The rolling hills azure like the sea,
The dying sun crimson like blood, of the fallen we march past.

This is a famous poem written during Long March. Loushan Pass is a place in Guizhou, where a fierce battle was fought.

=== Three Short Poems (1934–1935) ===
This poem is also known as "the Three Songs." It is written as three poems with sixteen characters each. This poem was written sometime between 1934 and 1935 during the Long March.

Mountain.
I whip my quick horse and do not dismount
and look back in wonder.
The sky is three feet away.

Mountain.
The sea collapses and the river boils.
Innumerable horses race
insanely into the peak of battle.

Mountain.
Peaks pierce the green sky, unblunted..
The sky would fall
but for the columns of mountains.

=== The Long March (1935) ===
This poem was written toward the end of 1935 when the Long March was almost finished. In it Mao listed some places Red Army had travelled through. Five Ridges and Wumeng are both big mountains in southwestern China. Jinsha is actually another name for certain parts of Yangtze River. Dadu River is at the west part of Sichuan, here in a heroic fight, 22 volunteers carried out a suicide attack on the KMT garrison across the iron-chained Luding Bridge and saved the Red Army from being destroyed. The Min Mountains are a mountain range at the Sichuan-Gansu border area, is already close to the end of Long March's route. To get rid of the pursuing KMT army, the Red Army had to climb over its 13000-foot peak and many froze to death on it.

The original poem written by Mao

Informal Translation:

The Long March
at the patten of Qilu

The Red Army fears not the Long March, hard and toil
Over ten thousand rivers, thousand hills, to our cause we're true and loyal.
Five peaks ever majestic, mere crests of a stream,
The Wumeng mountains, dark yet stately, we walk clay balls none too extreme.
The Jinsha torrents smite warm mists at cliffs, as sands glisten of gold
We cross the Dadu river upon iron chains, bone-chilling cold.
The exalted Minshan Mountain, thousand leagues of snow,
Yet our three armies cross it, faces of joy beam and glow!

Actually, the Long March was done by three CPC armies separately. One was Mao's 1st Red Army from Jiangxi Soviet, another was Zhang Guotao's 4th Red Army from Hubei soviet, the third one was He Long's 2nd Red Army from west part of Hubei. Here, Mao was glad all three Red Armies were together.

=== Kunlun (October 1935) ===
The Kunlun Mountains are a mountain range on the upper reaches of the Hotan River in Xinjiang Province, Northwestern China. According to Chinese folklore they (or a different, mythological mythical Kunlun Mountain) are the residence of a pantheon of gods.

念奴嬌·昆侖
現代-毛澤東

橫空出世，莽昆侖，閱盡人間春色。
飛起玉龍三百萬，攪得周天寒徹。
夏日消溶，江河橫溢，人或為魚鼈。
仟秋功罪，誰人曾與評說？

而今我謂昆侖：不要這高，不要這多雪。
安得倚天抽寶劍，把汝裁為三截？
一截遺歐，一截贈美，一截還東國。
太平世界，環球同此涼熱。

Acrosseth the air, aboveth in the azure,
The Kunlun peaks, snow white,
Thou hath't seen the fairest of man and nature
Three million jade dragons in flight,
Freezing the Heavens, up in the bone-chilling height.
In summer days, to thine melting snow,
Thy torrents rage and flow,
Where thou hath't sent many a men to sleep tight
With the fishes and turtles down below.
From whom has judgement passed to the evil and the good
In these thousands of autumns thou haths't stood?

Today, to Kunlun I sayeth: NO!
Needless is thine height!
Nor is all thine snow!
Could the Celestial Sword in all its might
Cleave thee in three at my behest
Sendeth to the Occident thine crest,
Giveth to Mundus Novus thine breast,
And keepeth in the Orient the rest.
Peace wouldst prevail, acrosseth all mankind
The same warmth and cold with none left behind!

Mao added annotations to this poem, commenting "An ancient poet said, 'Three million dragons of white jade are fighting, their broken scales fly all over the sky. In this way he described the flying snow, but here I have used it to describe snowy mountains. In summer, when one climbs the Min Mountain, one looks out on far mountains that seem to dance and shine in dazzling whiteness. There was a saying among the people that years ago the Monkey King (Sun Hsing-che) passed by, all the mountains were on fire. But he borrowed a palm-leaf fan and quenched the flame and that is why the mountains froze and turned white."

=== Mount Liupan (October 1935) ===
"Mount Liupan" was written in late 1935 after the Red Army almost finished the Long March. Mount Liupan is a mountain in northwestern China.

清平樂·六盤山
現代-毛澤東
天高雲淡，望斷南飛雁。
不到長城非好漢，屈指行程二萬。
六盤山上高峰，紅旗漫卷西風。
今日長纓在手，何時縛住蒼龍？

Heavens are high, clouds are light
Wild geese disappear Southwards in flight!
None can claim Greatness without surmounting the Great Wall's majestic height!
Twenty thousand leagues we marched, to this site.
High upon the zenith of the Six Coils crest
Fluttering in the west wind, our Red banners glow in zest
Today, with the long spear in hand,
When shall we seize the Azure Dragon?

Line 3 is a quote that inspires millions of tourists who visit the Great Wall every year.

=== Snow (February 1936) ===
Also translated as Patio Spring Snow, Snow is Mao's most famous poem. It was written in 1936 just after the Long March when the communists had reached Yan'an. He presented it to Liu Yazi, a poet whom Mao had met in Guangzhou in the early 1920s and who, like Mao, favored the traditional ci and lü forms. Through its descriptions of the limitations of the most prominent emperors in Chinese history and its exhortation to look to the present, the poem reflects Mao's ambitions.

Snow was published in newspapers in 1945 when Mao went to Chongqing in 1945 to hold peace talks with Chiang Kai-shek. Chiang tried to write a similar poem but failed to do so.

Now, it is widely studied by students in mainland China.

Below is the original poem in Chinese with both a literal English translation and a metric adaptation using one iamb per Chinese character:

沁园春·雪 北国风光， 千里冰封， 万里雪飘。 望长城内外， 惟余莽莽； 大河上下， 顿失滔滔。 山舞银蛇， 原驰腊象， 欲与天公试比高。 须晴日， 看红装素裹， 分外妖娆。 江山如此多娇， 引无数英雄竞折腰。 惜秦皇汉武， 略输文采； 唐宗宋祖， 稍逊风骚。 一代天骄， 成吉思汗， 只识弯弓射大雕。 俱往矣， 数风流人物， 还看今朝。	Qinyuanchun: Snow The scene of the country's north, Sealed in ice for one thousand li, Snow floating for ten thousand li. Looking both within and outside the Great Wall, All that is left is an empty expanse. Up and down the Yellow River, The rapids have halted. Like silver serpents the mountains dance, Like wax-colored elephants the highlands gallop, Seeking to challenge the Heavenly Duke in stature. Given a clear day, The sight of red and white robes, Is incomparably enchanting. Such a delicate landscape, Inspired numberless heroes to arch their forms at the waist. Such a shame that Qin Huang and Han Wu, Lacked literary talent; Tang Zong and Song Zu, Lacked playfulness. One era's arrogant son of Heaven, Genghis Khan, Only knew how to draw his bow and shoot condors. They are to be put in the past, As in counting great people, One must look back to the present.	Snow My country’s northern scenery: A thousand li encased in ice, Ten thousand li of swirling snow. The noble Wall surrounded on both sides By only blank totality. The Yellow River’s epic stretch Locked into place, its torrents stilled. The mountains, dancing silver snakes, The highlands, charging elephants, Triumphantly competing with the heavens’ lofty height. And come a clear day, The land adorned with sunlight, draped in white, Seduces all who bear its sight. That wondrous view, so dear and tender all at once, Moved countless heroes, bowing from their waists, to pay their due homage. Alas, for Zheng of Qin and Wu of Han Grasped not the art of poetry, While Zong of Tang and Zu of Song Had not virile minds nor forms. A generation’s pride and joy, The fierce and mighty Genghis Khan, Knew only how to shoot the condors up above the steppes. They are but history, For those who seek a greater figure yet Must look toward this age alone.

Alternate translation:
The Northern scene: thousand leagues of ice, ten thousand leagues of blizzards blow.
The Great Wall within and without, a shimmering silver sheet of snow
The Yellow River's raging torrent frozen in time, stilled in its flow.
The mountains dance like silver snakes, wax elephants on grasslands
Vying for zenith with the Lord of Heaven himself in his Château!
On a fine day, adorned in a crimson glow, enchantingly so.

This land rich in beauty, to which bowed many a hero of long ago
But alas! Qin Shihuang and Han Wudi lack literary lustre,
Tang Taizong and Song Taizu? Little artistry they know,
That Pride of Heaven, Genghis Khan,
Knew only shooting eagles, outstretched is his bow.
All are past and gone! For only in our age is true greatness, on show!

The first half praises the grandeur and beauty of northern China in the winter. The more politically significant part is the second half, where Mao lists important Chinese emperors, including Qin Shihuang, the first emperor of a united China; Emperor Wu of Han, the Han emperor who defeated the Huns; Emperor Taizong of Tang, the second emperor of the Tang dynasty; Emperor Taizu of Song, the first emperor of the Song dynasty; and Genghis Khan, whom the Chinese celebrate as the founder of the Yuan dynasty despite him never personally conquering China. After describing the shortcomings of these past leaders, Mao implies his superiority to them, alluding to a famous passage from Romance of the Three Kingdoms where Cao Cao says to Liu Bei that “the only heroes in the world are you and I.”

=== The Immortals at the River: To Ding Ling ===
In December 1936, Mao sent the poem The Immortals at the River: To Ding Ling via military telegram to commemorate Ding Ling's escape from captivity by the KMT and her arrival in Yan'an. It is Mao's only poem dedicated to a writer. It reads:

The red banners on the wall flutter in the sinking afterglow

Over the solitary town whirls sweepingly the westerly blast.

The characters in Bao'an are at once jubilant.

In the cave dwelling is tendered a banquet,

To regale the very soul who was once imprisoned as a convict.

Who bears comparison with the slender pen?

Three thousand crack troops with Mausers as their equipment.

The planned battle array is deployed toward the east on the Long Mount.

A literate lady yesterday,

And a martial general at present.

The poem draws parallels between Ding's literary prowess and military prowess. Around 1945, Mao re-wrote the poem to change the last line from "a martial general" to a "female general", emphasizing her role as a heroine.

=== The PLA Captures Nanjing (April 1949) ===
In late April 1949, the communist PLA (People's Liberation Army) crossed the Yangtze River and captured the capital of KMT government: Nanjing. Mao wrote this poem to celebrate this historical event.

七律·人民解放軍佔領南京
現代-毛澤東

鍾山風雨起蒼黃，
百萬雄師過大江。
虎踞龍盤今勝昔，
天翻地覆慨而慷。
宜將剩勇追窮寇，
不可沽名學霸王。
天若有情天亦老，
人間正道是滄桑。

Wind howls and rain falls upon the Bell Hills in twilight,
A million gallant warriors shall cross the river tonight.
Like a Tiger Crouched and a Dragon Coiled we outshine our glorious past!
Heaven Turns and the Earth Churns, the World upside-down at last!
Hark! We cross, we chase our foe who flee to our advance,
We shall not be the crowned monkey, not a single chance.
If the Heavens above had Heart and Soul then Heaven itself shall age!
The righteous path in the world is filled with obstacles and change.

Zhong Mountain, or Bel Hill is a hill at the suburb of Nanjing.

Line 2: Great River means Yangtze River

Line 3-4: a tiger crouched, a dragon coiled;

Nanjing, a great city, had been the capital of six dynasties in Chinese history. Strategiests said this city was like a "crouching tiger", and a "curling dragon". Also can be in reference to Zhuge Liang's nickname of the crouching dragon.

Line 6: We shall not be the crowned monkey, not a single chance.

Xiang Yu led the uprising that toppled the Qin dynasty. After winning the war against the Qin dynasty, Xiang Yu fought against Liu Bang for the control of China. Xiang Xu was defeated and killed. His story was recorded in the Beijing Opera The Hegemon-King Bids His Concubine Farewell. Upon destroying the Qin, one of his advisors advised Xiang to establish his capital in the same place as the Qin. When Xiang refused, the advisor mocked him as a "Crowned Monkey" (沐猴而冠). Xiang responded by executing the advisor by frying in hot oil.

=== Reply to Mr. Liu Yazi (October 1950) ===
Poems, "For Mr. Liu Yazi," dated 1949 and October 1950.

Line 1: "Crimson Land", similar to " Divine Land ", is another way Chinese people call their own country.

Line 5: "Yutian", a place in Xinjiang, here means far away places.

=== Swimming (1956) ===
Mao wrote "Swimming" in June 1956.

水調歌頭·遊泳
現代-毛澤東

才飲長沙水，又食武昌魚。
萬裏長江橫渡，極目楚天舒。
不管風吹浪打，勝似閒庭信步，今日得寬餘。
子在川上曰：逝者如斯夫！

風檣動，龜蛇靜，起宏圖。
一橋飛架南北，天塹變通途。
更立西江石壁，截斷巫山雲雨，高峽出平湖。
神女應無恙，當驚世界殊。

Prelude to Water Melody: Swimming

In Changsha I drank the water of the Xiang, Now I savour the fish of Wuchang.
As I swim across the Ten Thousand league Chang Jiang, I gaze above at the wide Welkin over the ancient Kingdom of Chu.
Let the winds blow and waves wash upon this wondrous view! Far surpassing idle strolls in the courtyard in lieu, For today I am relaxed and mellow.
Upon the river, the Master lamented, well and true: Thus like a current doth time flow!

Sails doth the wind fill, The Tortoise and Snake lay still, Great plans doth we fulfill!
A bridge flies from south to north, the deep chasm becomes a thoroughfare henceforth!
To my west shall stand a great stone wall, and hold the clouds and rains of Mount Wu as they fall, a great lake shall rise in the high gorge!
The Goddess of the Mountain shall stand tall, and marvel at the world we shall forge!

The poem's imagery contrasts the physicality and freedom of water with the limitations of Beijing.

The Great Stone Wall is one of the first references to the Three Gorges Dam. The Tortoise and the Snake refers to two mountains in Wuhan. He had previously referenced the two mountains in his previous poem The Yellow Crane Tower. The bridge in question completes the final section of the Beijing Guangzhou railway. The incomplete railroad was again referenced previously in the Yellow Crane Tower.

The poem evokes the changes intended to transform China through collectivization of agriculture and industrial production.

=== Farewell to the God of Plague (1958) ===
Mao wrote "Farewell to the God of Plague" to commemorate a successful public health campaign during the Great Leap Forward to eliminate Schistosomiasis in Yu Jiang County, Jiangxi.

== See also ==
- Chinese poetry
- Stalin's poetry
