= Tingzhou =

Tingzhou may refer to:

- Tingzhou, Longyan, a town in Changting County, Longyan City, Fujian Province
- Tingzhou fu, a former prefecture in western Fujian
  - Tingzhou dialect, a group of Hakka dialects historically spoken in the Tingzhou prefecture
- Roman Catholic Diocese of Tingzhou, in the Ecclesiastical province of Fuzhou
- Dingzhou, a county-level city in Hebei
- Tingzhou or Beiting, an ancient city in modern Jimsar County, Xinjiang
