= Tingzhou dialect =

Hakka dialect of Fujian, China

- 汀州片
- Region: western Fujian
- Language family: Sino-Tibetan: Sinitic; Chinese; Hakka–Gan?; Hakka–She?; Hakka; Tingzhou dialect
- Dialects: Changting
- Writing system: Chinese characters Pha̍k-fa-sṳ

Language codes
- ISO 639-3: –
- ISO 639-6: tigz
- Glottolog: ting1250

The Tingzhou dialect (Chinese: 汀州片; pinyin: Tīngzhōupiàn) is a group of Hakka dialects spoken in Longyan and Sanming (historically Tingzhou), southwestern Fujian. Tingzhou includes the Hakka dialects spoken in the counties originally under the jurisdiction of Tingzhou: Changting (Tingzhou), Ninghua, Qingliu, Liancheng, Wuping, Shanghang, Yongding and Mingxi. The Changting dialect is generally regarded as the representative dialect of this branch of Hakka.

== See also ==
- Changting dialect
