= Tingchow =

Tingchow may refer to:

- Tingzhou fu, the old name of Changting prefecture in Fujian province, China ("Tingchow" in Wade-Giles romanization)

- Tingzhou, a modern town in Changting County
- The Roman Catholic Diocese of Tingzhou, which was created before the name change and is coextensive with the prefecture

- Dingzhou, Hubei ("Tingchow" in Chinese postal romanization)
