= Shicheng County =

Shicheng 石城县 Shihcheng
- County
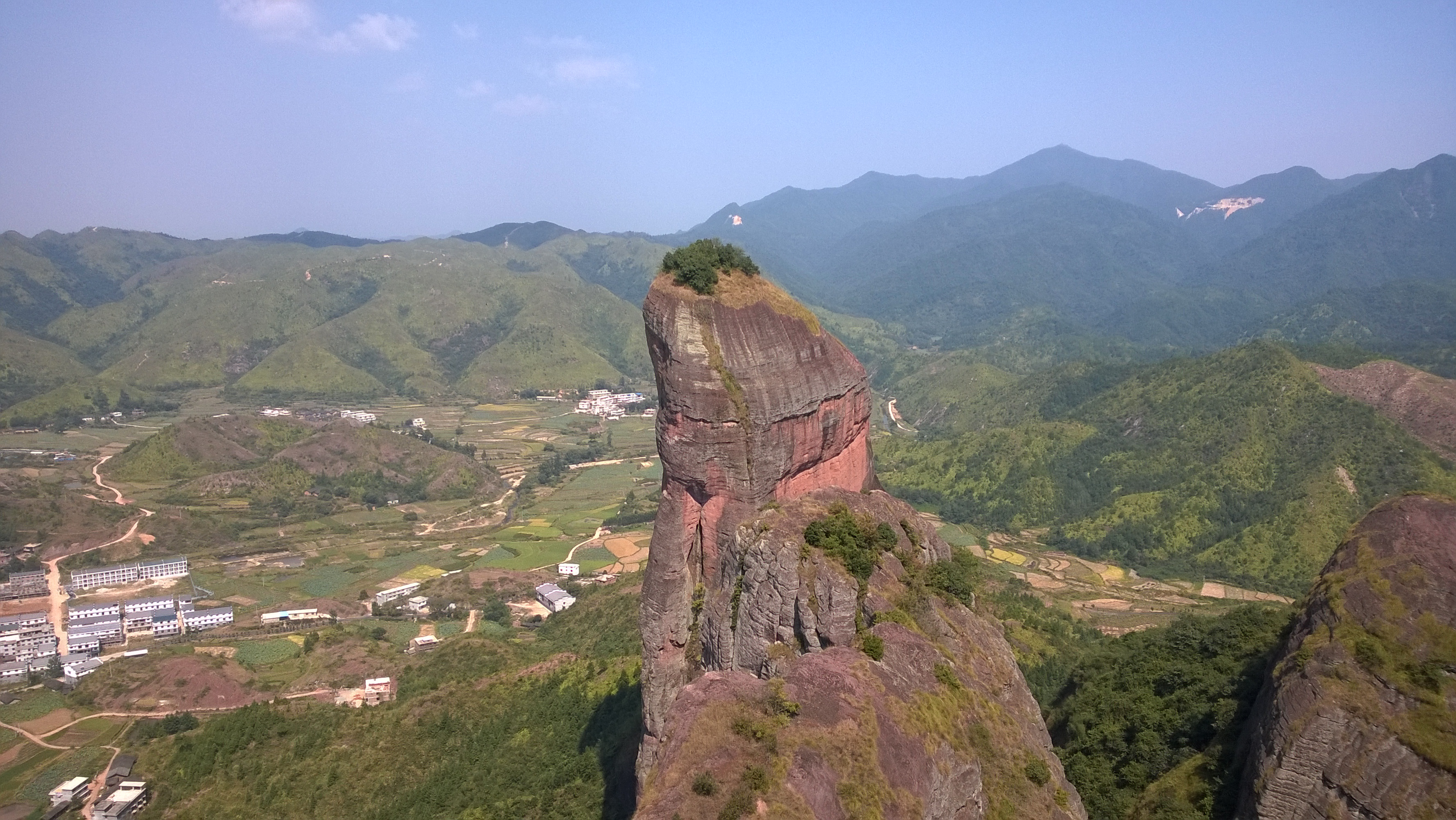
- Danxia landform in Tongtianzhai Geological Park

- Coordinates: 26°18′53″N 116°20′49″E
- Country: People's Republic of China
- Province: Jiangxi
- Prefecture-level city: Ganzhou

Area
  - Total: 1,581.53 km^{2} (610.63 sq mi)

Population
  - Total: 333,000 (registered population in 2,017)
  - Density: 211/km^{2} (550/sq mi)
- Postal Code: 342700

Shicheng County (Chinese: 石城县; pinyin: Shíchéng Xiàn) is a county in the southeast of Jiangxi province, People's Republic of China, bordering Fujian province to the east. It is the easternmost county-level division of the prefecture-level city of Ganzhou.

== Culture ==
Like their cousins in other counties of the southern Jiangxi uplands, the people of Shicheng are Hakkas, and pride themselves on their heritage of friendliness, especially to guests and strangers (Hospitality).

== Demographics ==
=== Population ===
The county has a population of 300,000, which is one of the smallest in the Ganzhou municipal region.

== Climate ==
Climate data for Shicheng, elevation 280 m (920 ft), (1991–2020 normals, extremes 1981–present)
Month	Jan	Feb	Mar	Apr	May	Jun	Jul	Aug	Sep	Oct	Nov	Dec	Year
Record high °C (°F)	26.9 (80.4)	30.7 (87.3)	30.9 (87.6)	34.1 (93.4)	35.7 (96.3)	37.5 (99.5)	39.4 (102.9)	39.4 (102.9)	37.0 (98.6)	36.1 (97.0)	32.5 (90.5)	27.2 (81.0)	39.4 (102.9)
Mean daily maximum °C (°F)	12.4 (54.3)	15.3 (59.5)	18.4 (65.1)	24.4 (75.9)	28.3 (82.9)	30.7 (87.3)	33.7 (92.7)	33.2 (91.8)	30.4 (86.7)	26.0 (78.8)	20.9 (69.6)	15.0 (59.0)	24.1 (75.3)
Daily mean °C (°F)	7.4 (45.3)	10.0 (50.0)	13.4 (56.1)	19.2 (66.6)	23.2 (73.8)	26.0 (78.8)	28.2 (82.8)	27.7 (81.9)	24.9 (76.8)	20.1 (68.2)	14.8 (58.6)	9.2 (48.6)	18.7 (65.6)
Mean daily minimum °C (°F)	4.1 (39.4)	6.5 (43.7)	10.1 (50.2)	15.4 (59.7)	19.6 (67.3)	22.7 (72.9)	24.1 (75.4)	23.8 (74.8)	21.1 (70.0)	15.9 (60.6)	10.6 (51.1)	5.3 (41.5)	14.9 (58.9)
Record low °C (°F)	−6.6 (20.1)	−3.7 (25.3)	−2.8 (27.0)	3.6 (38.5)	8.6 (47.5)	14.0 (57.2)	19.4 (66.9)	18.2 (64.8)	12.1 (53.8)	3.4 (38.1)	−1.6 (29.1)	−7.8 (18.0)	−7.8 (18.0)
Average precipitation mm (inches)	75.5 (2.97)	103.3 (4.07)	211.2 (8.31)	201.6 (7.94)	298.6 (11.76)	326.5 (12.85)	159.5 (6.28)	173.3 (6.82)	73.0 (2.87)	57.6 (2.27)	75.8 (2.98)	61.2 (2.41)	1,817.1 (71.53)
Average precipitation days (≥ 0.1 mm)	11.5	12.9	18.5	16.9	17.8	17.6	13.2	14.3	9.3	6.3	8.3	8.2	154.8
Average snowy days	1.2	1.0	0.1	0	0	0	0	0	0	0	0	0.5	2.8
Average relative humidity (%)	80	81	83	81	81	82	77	79	79	76	78	77	80
Mean monthly sunshine hours	92.1	92.0	86.7	116.2	137.3	153.2	253.4	228.4	191.0	179.0	147.8	133.9	1,811
Percentage possible sunshine	28	29	23	30	33	37	60	57	52	51	46	41	41
Source: China Meteorological Administrationall-time May low

== Economy ==
=== Transportation ===
National Route 206 crosses the county from north to south, from Guangchang County town in Fuzhou to Ruijin City, Ganzhou.

Province-maintained roads lead off 206, westward through Pingshan Town into Ningdu County, Ganzhou, and eastward (over the watershed into Fujian), to Shibi Town and Ninghua County-town, both in Sanming.

=== Agriculture ===
The county's agricultural economy is bolstered by lotus as well as by the tobacco picked up by the government-monopoly CNTC.

== Administration ==
The county government, lower-level court, CPC branch and GongAn branch are located in Qinjiang town (琴江镇) on National Route 206.

=== Towns (镇, zhen) ===
There are 5 towns:

- Gaotian (高田镇), Xiaosong (小松镇), Pingshan (屏山镇), Huangjiang (櫎江镇) and Qinjiang (琴江镇))

=== Townships (乡, xiang) ===
There are 5 townships:

- Mulan (木兰乡), Fengshan (丰山乡), Zhukeng (珠坑乡), Dayou (大由乡) and Longgang (龙岗乡),
- 5 former townships are merged to other: Changtian (长天乡), Yanling (岩岭乡), Guanxia (观下乡), Xiaogu (小姑乡)and Yangdi (洋地乡)
