= Diocese of Tingzhou =

Roman Catholic diocese in China

Coordinates: 25°41′N 116°20′E

Diocese of Tingzhou Dioecesis Timceuvensis 天主教汀州教区

Location
- Country: China
- Territory: Longyan (except Zhangping); Ninghua County, Qingliu County, Mingxi County, Sanyuan District, and Meilie District of Sanming
- Ecclesiastical province: Fuzhou
- Metropolitan: Fuzhou

Statistics
- Area: 20,000 km^{2} (7,700 sq mi)
- Population: Total; Catholics: (as of 1950); 1,220,000; 4,318 (0.4%)

Information
- Denomination: Roman catholic
- Rite: Latin Rite
- Cathedral: Cathedral of Our Lady of the Rosary

Current leadership
- Pope: Leo XIV
- Bishop: Sede Vacante
- Metropolitan Archbishop: Peter Lin Jiashan

The Roman Catholic Diocese of Tingzhou/Changting (Latin: Timceuven(sis), Chinese: 汀州/長汀) is a diocese co-extensive with the Chinese imperial prefecture Tingzhou fu. The cathedral is located in the present-day Tingzhou town.

Post-revolutionary facts on the ground notwithstanding, the diocese remains in the ecclesiastical province of Fuzhou, under the Metropolitan See at Fuzhou.

== History ==
- December 27, 1923: Established as Apostolic Prefecture of Tingzhou 汀州 from the Apostolic Vicariate of Northern Fo-kien 福建北境
- May 8, 1947: Promoted as Diocese of Tingzhou 汀州

Bishops of Tingzhou 汀州 (Roman rite)

- Bishop Johann Werner Lesinski, O.P. (May 8, 1947 – April 26, 1963)

Prefects Apostolic of Tingzhou 汀州 (Roman Rite)

- Fr. Edber M. Pelzer, O.P. (December 21, 1925 – 1945)
