= Ting River =

Coordinates: 25.8135°N 116.5706°E

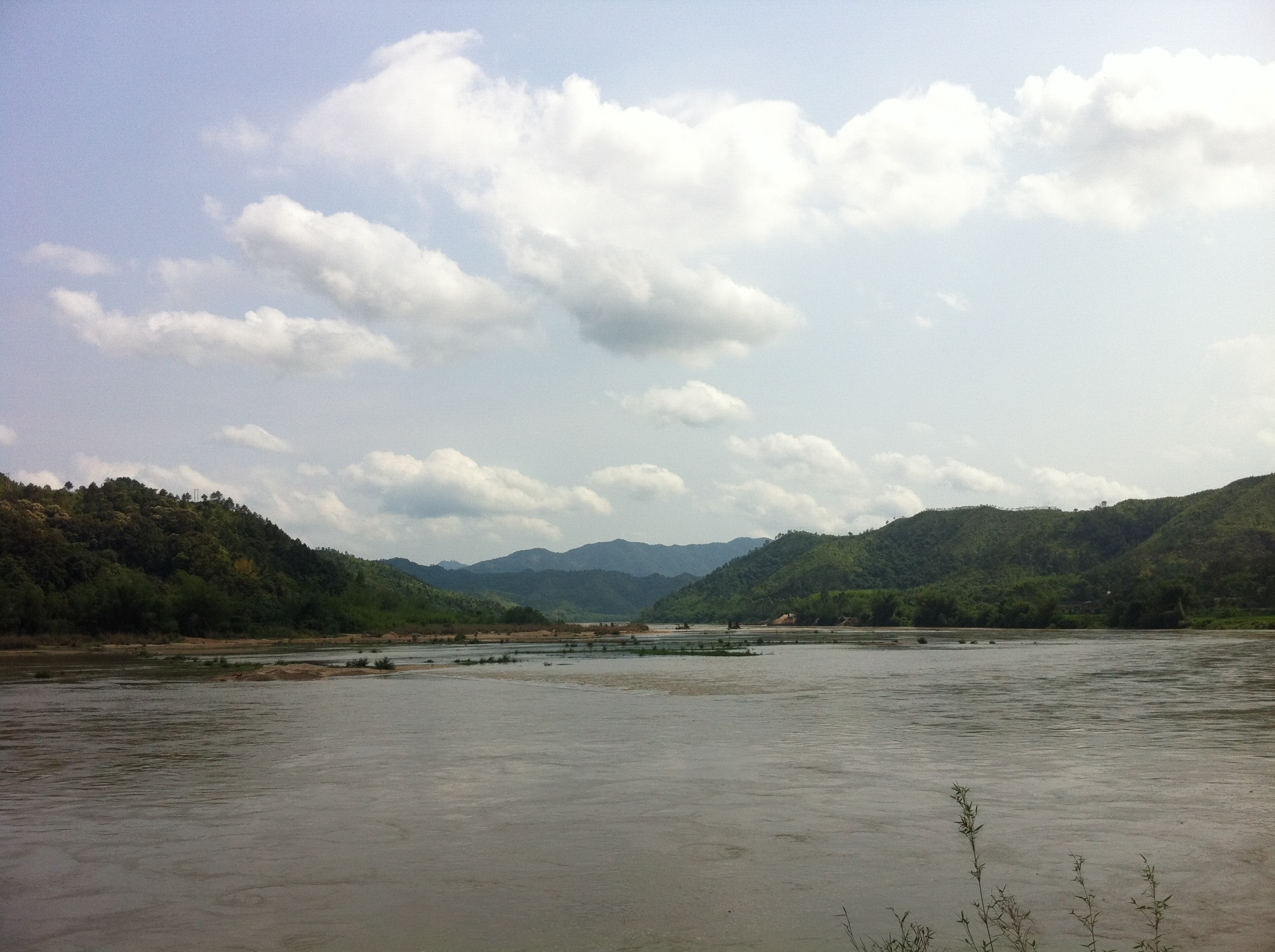
- Native name: 汀江 (Chinese)

Location
- Country: China

Physical characteristics
- Length: 300 km (190 mi)

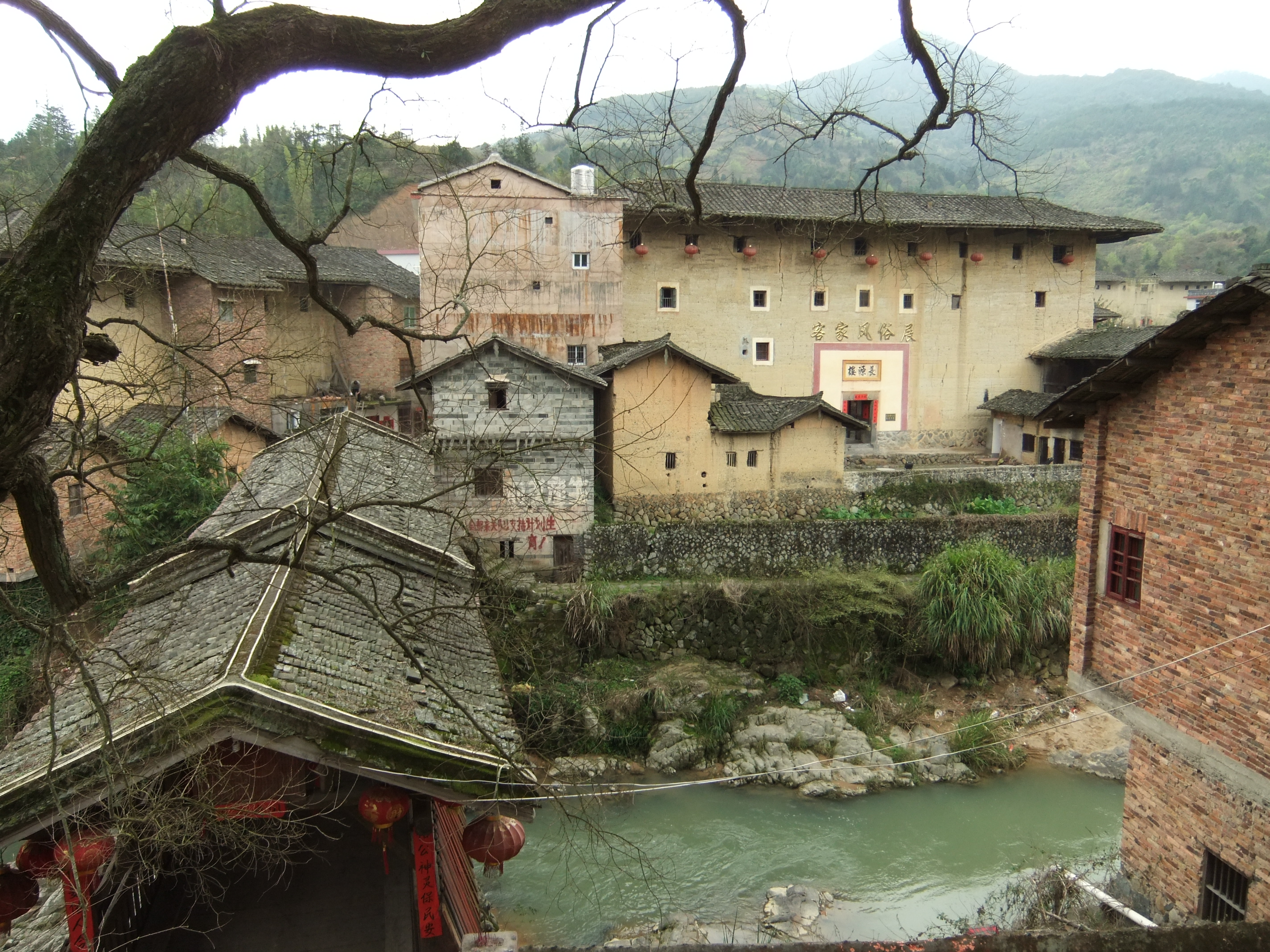
Nanxi Creek, an (eventual) tributary of the Ting River. Xinnan Village, Hukeng Town, Yongding County, Fujian

The Ting River (Chinese: 汀江; pinyin: Tíng Jiāng) flows 300 kilometres (190 mi) from Ninghua County in western Fujian south to the port and Special Economic Zone of Shantou, Guangdong. It is a main tributary of the Han River and is also referred to Hakka Mother River (Chinese: 客家母亲河).

The former prefecture of Tingzhou (汀州府) was administered from a centre on the upper river, now the town of Tingzhou in Changting County; all these places are named for the river. As most inhabitants of Tingzhou-fu/Changting are Hakka, and as (Hakka-speaking) Meizhou (梅州) is next downstream, the Tingjiang is considered by some to be the mother river of all the Hakkas.

The Tingjiang is unique among Fujianese rivers in that its lower watershed and debouchment are outside the province. The traffic in Tingzhou-fu/Changting then (before road and rail came very recently) was always primarily with eastern areas of Guangdong, namely Meizhou and, further down, the Min-Nan-speaking Chao-Shan area -- Chaozhou (潮州) and Shantou (汕头).

== Environmental Concerns ==
The Ting River has encountered environmental difficulties in recent years. A notable incident of pollution took place in July 2010, when a waste spill from a copper mine operated by Zijin Mining in Shanghang County contaminated the river, causing considerable ecological harm, including the death of fish.This event highlighted the environmental risks associated with mining activities in the area and spurred conservations about sustainable practices and the preservation of the river.

== Tributaries ==
- Yongding River (Fujian) - left tributary; much of Yongding County is within its drainage area. (Not to be confused with the Yongding River in Beijing)
