= Lesinski =

Lesinski is a Polish surname: Notable people with the surname include:

- Johann Lesinski (1904–1963), German bishop
- John Lesinski, people
- T. John Lesinski (1925–1996), American politician and judge
- Zdzisław Lesiński (1921–2000), Polish gymnast
