= Rentian =

Rentian may refer to the following locations in China:

- Rentian, Fujian (稔田镇), town in Shanghang County
- Rentian, Jiangxi (壬田镇), town in Ruijin
