= Changsha (disambiguation) =

Changsha (Ch’ang-sha) is the capital of China's Hunan province.

Changsha may also refer to:

- Changsha County, a local county
- Changsha dialect, the local dialect of the Xiang language family
- "Changsha" (poem), a 1925 poem by Mao Zedong
- Changsha (ship) (2020), a multi-purpose cargo ship owned and operated by the Swire Shipping, a division of China Navigation Company
- Changsha Kingdom, a state during the Han dynasty of China.
- Changsha Island, a former island in the Yangtze estuary now joined to Chongming
- Changsha Village, Huangqi, Lianjiang County, Fuzhou, Fujian, China
- The Chinese name of the star Zeta Corvi

== See also ==
- Changshu, in Jiangsu
- Chinese destroyer Changsha (173)
