= Qingliu =

Qingliu may referf to the following places in China:

- Qingliu County, Fujian
- Qingliu, a town in Xindu, Chengdu, Sichuan
