= Johann Lesinski =

Johann Lesinski OP
- Bishop of Tingzhou
- Church: Catholic Church
- Diocese: Diocese of Tingzhou
- In office: 8 May 1947 – 26 April 1963
- Predecessor: Egbert Maria Pelzer
- Successor: Sede Vacante

Orders
- Ordination: 29 July 1932
- Consecration: 26 October 1947 by Theodore Labrador Fraile

Personal details
- Born: Johann Werner Lesinski; 1904 Berlin, Kingdom of Prussia, German Empire
- Died: 26 April 1963 (aged 58–59)

Johann Lesinski (1904–63) was the first and -to date- only bishop of Tingzhou, in the ecclesiastical province of Fuzhou.

A German, Lesinski belonged to the Ordo Praedicatorum (the Dominicans). He was ordained into the priesthood in July 1932, before his 28th birthday anniversary. In May 1947 the apostolic prefecture of Tingzhou (consisting mostly of the ROC's Changting Prefecture) was promoted to Diocesan standing and Lesiniski was named its bishop (consecrated thus in October of that year).

== Struggle with National Catholicism ==
Changting in Western Fujian Province was liberated by Communists a little over two years later (now renamed Longyan). Lesinski's Cathedral, in Longyan's Tingzhou town, was not deemed useful to the Sinican Catholic movement and has lain uncelebrated even since reform and opening up under Deng Xiaoping.

Lesinski died in 1963, on April 26, aged 58.
