= Liu Zhixun =

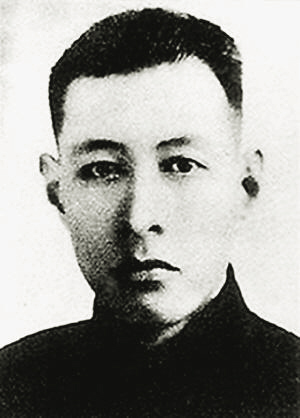

Liu Zhixun (Chinese: 柳直荀; November 1898 – September 14, 1932), also known as Liu Keming (Chinese: 刘克明), was a member of the Chinese Workers' and Peasants' Red Army. He was purged by Chinese Communist Party leader Xia Xi and executed.

== Biography ==
He was born in Changsha, Hunan Province. His father was an acquaintance of Yang Changji, father of Mao Zedong's first wife Yang Kaihui. He was educated at the Yali School in Changsha (which was at the time an American-run private school). In 1919, he led a boycott of Japanese imports. He joined the Chinese Communist Party (CCP) in February 1924, at the invitation of He Shuheng. In that same year he joined the faculty of the Changsha Normal School (now Changsha Normal University). He married Li Shuyi, who was introduced to him by Yang Kaihui. In July 1926, the armies of the Northern Expedition arrived in Hunan, and Liu was tasked to set up a provincial government. In December 1926, he was made secretary-general. On May 21, 1927, after the breakdown of the First United Front between the Kuomintang and the CCP and the start of the Chinese Civil War, Liu participated in the Mari Incident in Changsha. In July 1927, he met with He Long to prepare for the Nanchang Uprising of August 1, 1927. After the failure of the Nanchang Uprising, he fled to Hong Kong, where his English language skills enabled him to contact the Swire Group in Sai Kung. He later went to Shanghai and in September 1928 to Tianjin. In 1929 he was put in charge of the CCP in Hubei Province. In April 1930, he went to Honghu, a town in Hubei under CCP control. In June 1931, he organized in the CCP strongholds in northwestern Hubei. In August 1931, a guerrilla force was created. In January 1932, his district was brought under the jurisdiction of the Hunan-Western Hubei Soviet. Liu opposed the efforts of Xia Xi, one of the 28 Bolsheviks, to carry out a purge of the Soviets. Xia framed Liu and 1,500 other communists as being secret members of the Kuomintang's Anti-Bolshevik group. Liu was brought to Jianli County and killed.

== Legacy ==
Liu's widow Li Shuyi did not know of his death until 1934. He was politically rehabilitated in 1945. In 1957, after the founding of the People's Republic of China, Mao Zedong wrote a Reply to Li Shuyi to Liu's widow. Liu was also survived by his father and two young children.
