= Pompolit =

Pompolit (Помполит), or in merchant navy jargon pompa, was a political officer rank on Soviet merchant and passenger ships as well as other ships sailing outside USSR borders. It is not to be confused with the Political commissar, which was the equivalent rank in military units.

== The difference between "politruk" and "pompolit" ==
The military rank "Politruk" is an abbreviation of "политический руководитель" ("political leader" or "political supervisor"), combining "полит+рук" ("polit+ruk").

However, the Soviet merchant navy followed the practice of the ship's captain having absolute authority on board ship. Therefore, appointing an officer with the authority of a politruk would be inappropriate. Instead, during peacetime, the ship's captain would need a 'mate' (assistant) rather than a leader or a supervisor.

- "Pompolit": Russian "Помполит" is an abbreviation of "помощник по политической части" ("mate (assistant) for political affairs") or "помощник по политике" ("assistant (mate) in politic"), composed as "пом+по+лит" (pom+po+lit).
- "Pompa": is seamen's jargon referring to the duties of the "pompolit", i.e. to teach and explain Soviet political ideas. This is a play on the Russian word for the pump, "помпа" (pompa), alluding that the pompolit is filling up the brains of soviet sailors with the official ideology like a pump.

== The pompolit's obligations ==
The Soviet pompolits were tasked with ensuring the crew conformed to the following rules (list not complete):

- No crew member may speak in English to any foreigner except the officers during mooring operations, cargo operations, bunker operations and resupplying the ship. If the cargo officer or master has to speak in English with representatives of the foreign port, the pompolit must attend these conversations.
- The Pompolit's duty was to monitor the moral comportment of all crew members and to write down reports accordingly. Incriminating behaviors would include alcohol abuse, sex, anti-Soviet conversations, attendance at any entertainment deemed immoral while ashore in other countries (like stripteases), etc.
- He [the Pompolit] had to instruct the crew politically at least once a week to reduce and keep under control the crew members' spare time to avoid negative thoughts or behaviors (such as drinking alcohol). The idea behind this practice was: "less spare time - less problems".

Extensive knowledge of English for low-ranking sailors could be dangerous. If a crew member saw a pompolit approaching, he would frequently stop conversation with foreigners to avoid a misunderstanding with the pompolit.

The cargo officer had to call the pompolit to attend during his conversations on cargo operations with the chief stevedore. This had to be the case even when the pompolits themselves could not speak English. On one Soviet ship the cargo officer said to another officer:

"What's the reason to attend during the conversations if he does not speak English? I may talk with the chief stevedore about anything including anti-Soviet conversations and the pompolit will understand nothing!"

Mostly, Soviet merchant navy officers, including captains, spoke only poor English because they were not taught the language properly to reduce their ability to learn about the world outside the Soviet Union.

The pompolit had to reduce the spare time of crew members, so only two persons in a Soviet crew had a lot of spare time - the ship's doctor and the pompolit.
