= Nelson Fu =

Mao Zedong's doctor who was later purged

Fu Lianzhang Nelson Fu
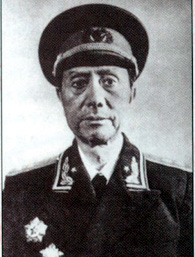

Personal details
- Born: September 14, 1894 Changting, Fujian, China
- Died: March 29, 1968 (aged 73) Beijing, PRC
- Party: Chinese Communist Party
- Awards: Order of Bayi (First Class); Order of Independence and Freedom (First Class); Order of Liberation (First Class)
- Alias: Zheng Aiqun

Military service
- Allegiance: Chinese Communist Party
- Branch/service: People's Liberation Army
- Years of service: 1933–1968
- Rank: Lieutenant General
- Battles/wars: Northern Expedition; Long March; Chinese Civil War

Nelson Fu
- Traditional Chinese: 傅連暲
- Simplified Chinese: 傅连暲
Transcriptions
Standard Mandarin
- Hanyu Pinyin: Fù Liánzhāng

Nelson Fu or Fu Lianzhang (Chinese: 傅连暲; 14 September 1894 – 29 March 1968) was a Chinese medical doctor. He was one of the few Western-trained medical doctors to have made the Long March and later, in Beijing, a Vice Minister of Public Health, to be responsible for the health of the Chinese Communist Party (CCP) elite. According to Mao's personal doctor Li Zhisui, it was Fu who recruited him, then living in Australia, back to work for the government. In 1955, he was awarded the rank of Lieutenant General of the People's Liberation Army.

== Education and career ==
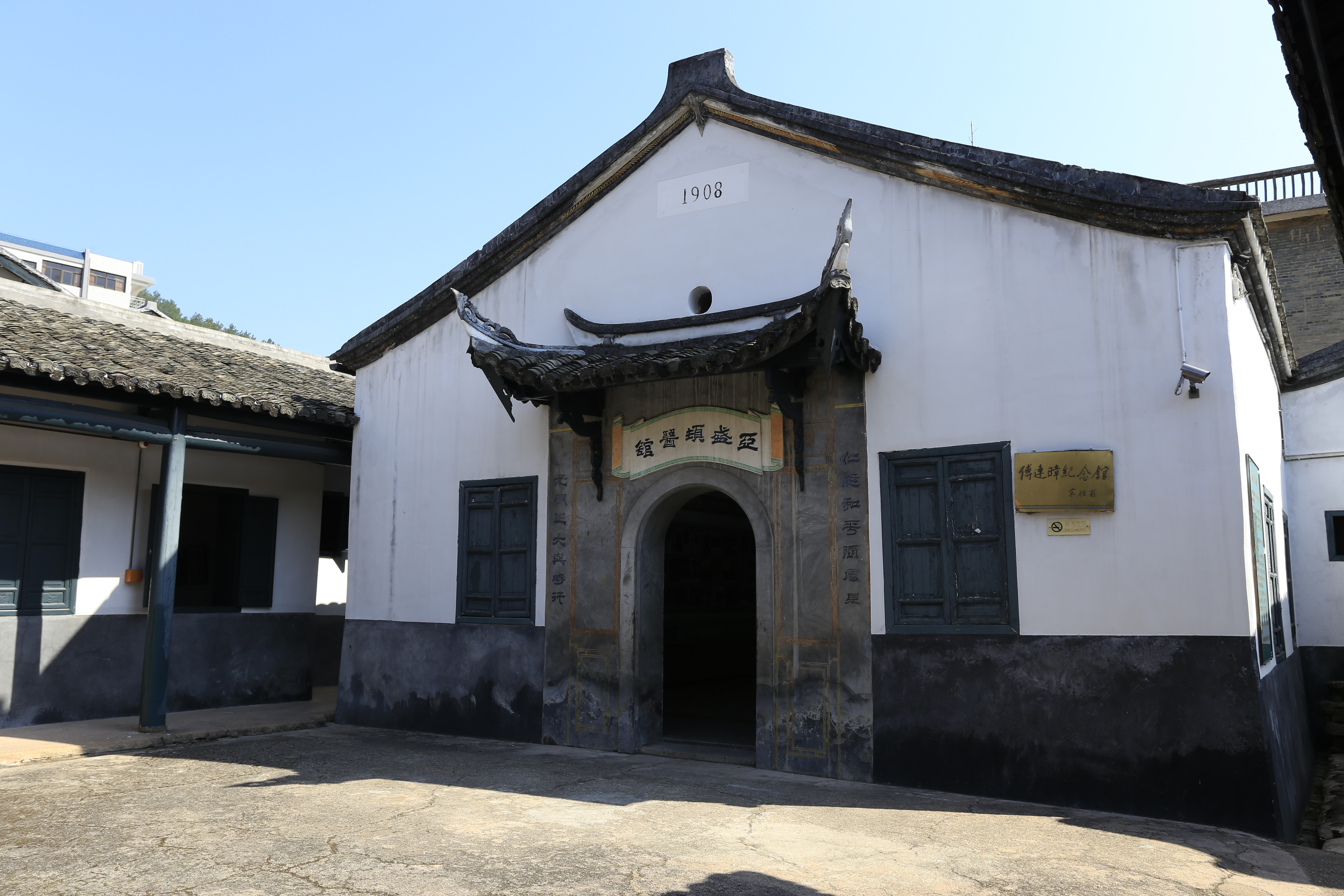
Fu Lianzhang museum in Changting, Fujian

In the 1920s and 1930s, Fu lived and worked in the then-prefectural seat of Changting (now Tingzhou) in Western Fujian. He was a senior medical doctor at its British Christian missionary Ashington Medical Center, where he was educated. It was renamed the Hospital of the Gospel under Fu's management in 1926.

In late 1925, he met Deng Zihui, who gave him several copies of the newspaper "The Sound of Rocks" and the magazine "New Social View", which promoted communist ideology and greatly influenced his thinking. In early 1933, he joined the Red Army, relocating the original Gospel Hospital to Ruijin and transforming it into the Central Red Hospital, serving as its director. After arriving in Northern Shaanxi, in January 1937, he was ordered to establish the Central Soviet Hospital in Yan'an. After the reorganization of 1937, Fu served as the Director of the Shaan-Gan-Ning Border Region Hospital. In September 1938, introduced by Mao Zedong and Chen Yun, he attended the Central Party Training Class and was later approved to join the Chinese Communist Party. In the winter of the same year, he served as the Director of the Central Committee's General Health Department and concurrently as the Director of the Central Hospital. In May 1945, he attended the 7th National Congress of the Chinese Communist Party. In October, he became the Vice Minister of the Central Military Commission's General Health Department and continued to be responsible for the health care work of the central leadership.

After the establishment of the People's Republic, he became a member of the All-China Federation of Natural Science Societies' Planning Committee, Director of the Chinese Medical Association and a participant of the second meeting of the National Political Consultative Conference. In 1952, Fu was a member and one of the many directors of the Chinese Red Cross Society. He also served as the Vice Minister of Health for the Central Committee and the first Vice Director of the General Logistics Department of the Central Military Commission.

== Downfall and death ==
Li Zhisui's memoir indicated that by the late 1950s, Fu, who had gradually lost the Chairman's favor, had to resign. Yet, Mao continued to have a positive impression of Fu. During the Cultural Revolution, Fu was severely persecuted by Vice Chairman Lin Biao as well as by his subordinates, particularly Qiu Huizuo and, despite Mao Zedong's attempts to protect him, he was subsequently beaten and imprisoned with the accusation that Fu was "withholding medicine when Deputy Commander Lin was ill [in order] to harm him". He died in prison on March 29, 1968, at the age of 74. After Lin's death, Mao posthumously rehabilitated him in 1973. Before his passing, Fu had authored works such as "How To Maintain Health" and "The Treatment of Tuberculosis".
