= Baisha, Shanghang County =

Baisha 白砂镇
- Town
- Location in Fujian Baisha (China)
- Coordinates: 25.1293°N 116.5993°E
- Country: People's Republic of China
- Province: Fujian
- Prefecture-level city: Longyan
- County: Shanghang County
- Time zone: UTC+8 (China Standard)

Baisha (Chinese: 白砂) is a town of Shanghang County, Fujian, China. As of 2018, it has 22 villages under its administration.
