= Gutian, Shanghang County =

Gutian 古田镇
- Town
- Location in Fujian Gutian (China)
- Coordinates: 25°13′16″N 116°49′28″E
- Country: People's Republic of China
- Province: Fujian
- Prefecture-level city: Longyan
- County: Shanghang
- Time zone: UTC+8 (China Standard)
- Postal code: 363200
- Area code: 0596

Gutian (Chinese: 古田; pinyin: Gǔtián; lit. 'old field') is one of the 17 towns in Shanghang County, in southwestern Fujian province. It is famous as the site of the 1929 Gutian Congress where Mao Zedong affirmed his leadership of the Zhu-Mao 4th Army (朱毛四军) of Red Army and stamped out democratic tendencies among the troops. The town and site may be reached by following National Route 319 west from Xinluo district, the Longyan municipal centre. As of 2018, it has one residential community and 20 villages under its administration.
