= Shibi, Fujian =

Shibi 石壁镇
- Town
- Location in Fujian Shibi (China)
- Coordinates: 26°14′40″N 116°30′50″E
- Country: People's Republic of China
- Province: Fujian
- Prefecture-level city: Sanming
- County: Ninghua
- Time zone: UTC+8 (China Standard)

Shibi (Chinese: 石壁; pinyin: Shíbì), literally Stone Wall, is one of four towns of Ninghua County, in western Fujian province, People's Republic of China, near the border with Jiangxi.

== History ==
Shibi bills itself as the Cradle of the Hakkas (客家人的摇篮) for its place in Hakka history.

=== Republic of China ===
Year 2: Tingzhou fu, the prefecture which oversees Ninghua, is renamed Changting (长汀).

=== Liberation ===
Tingzhou-fu/Changting is broken up; Ninghua and its towns now come under the new municipal region of Sanming.
