= Changting dialect =

Dialect of Tingzhou Hakka

- 長汀話
- Native to: China
- Region: Changting County, Fujian
- Native speakers: (173,000 cited 1993)
- Language family: Sino-Tibetan: Sinitic; Hakka; Tingzhou; Changting dialect
- Writing system: Chinese characters Pha̍k-fa-sṳ

Language codes
- ISO 639-3: –
- Glottolog: chan1325

The Changting dialect (simplified Chinese: 长汀话; traditional Chinese: 長汀話) is a dialect of Tingzhou Hakka mainly spoken in Changting County of northwest Fujian, China. It is generally regarded as the representative dialect of the Hakka spoken in western Fujian province.
