= Political commissar =

Political officer in the military

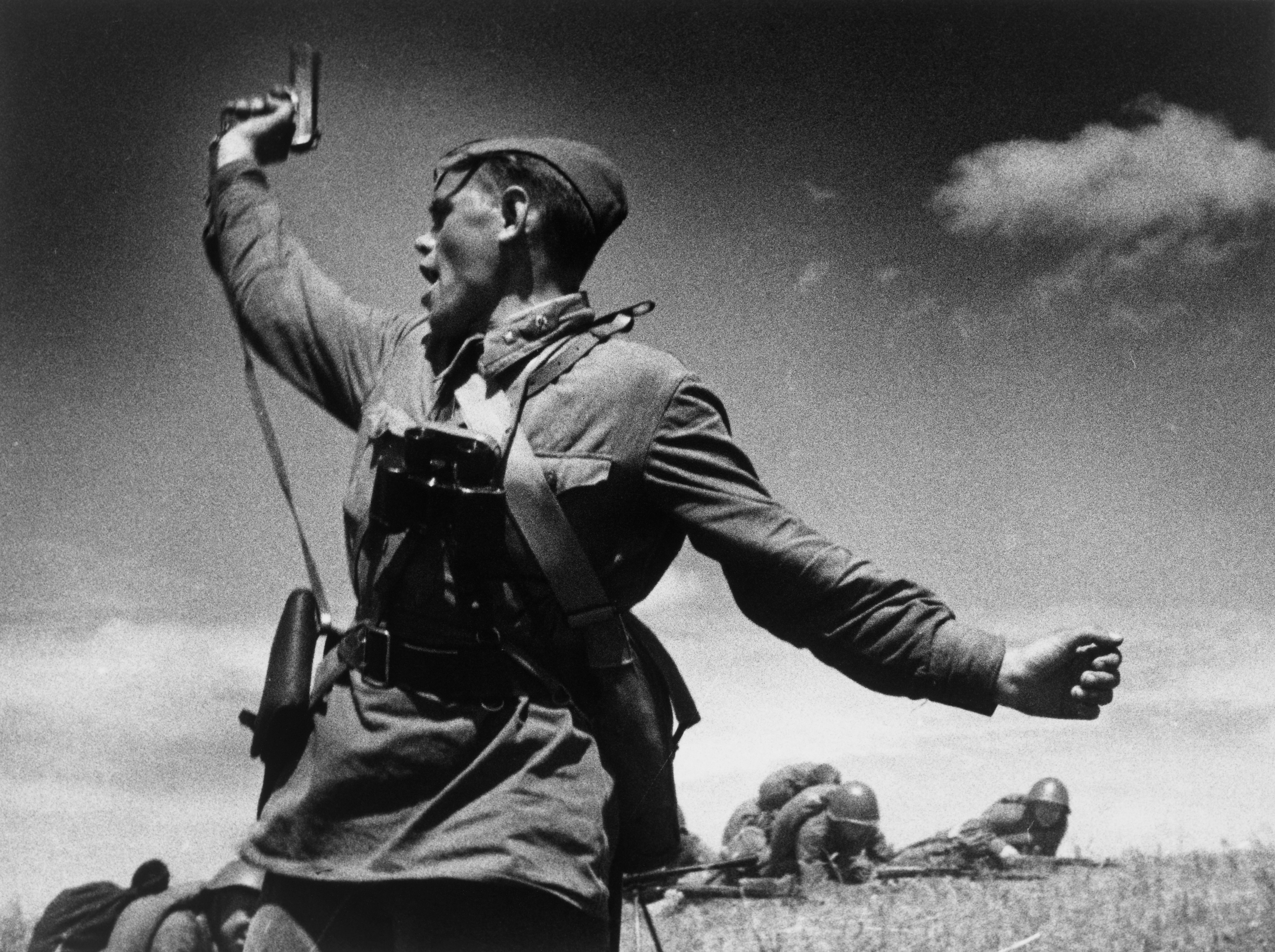
Kombat, a photo of a Soviet political commissar of the 220th Infantry Regiment calling soldiers to an assault, Eastern Front, in Soviet Ukraine, 12 July 1942

In the military, a political commissar or political officer (or politruk, a portmanteau word from Russian: политический руководитель, romanized: politicheskiy rukovoditel, lit. 'political leader or political instructor') is a supervisory officer responsible for the political education (ideology) and organization of the unit to which they are assigned, with the intention of ensuring political control of the military.

The function first appeared as commissaire politique (political commissioner) or représentant en mission (representative on mission) in the French Revolutionary Army during the French Revolution (1789–1799). Political commissars were heavily used within the International Brigades during the Spanish Civil War (1936–1939). They also existed, with interruptions, in the Soviet Red Army from 1918 to 1991, while a similar system existed in the armed forces of Nazi Germany from 1943 to 1945 as Nationalsozialistische Führungsoffiziere (NSFO; "National Socialist Leadership Officers").

The function remains in use in China's People's Liberation Army and the People's Army of Vietnam.

== China ==
=== People's Republic of China ===
The position of political commissar (Chinese: 政治委员) existed in the Chinese Red Army since the Sanwan Reorganization of 1927 (Chinese: 三湾改编), which established military organizations at various levels with Chinese Communist Party committees. The practice was formalized with the principle of the "Party commands the gun" and the Gutian Conference of 1929. Red Army was part of the Communist revolution forces; thus Mao Zedong had constantly emphasized its role in both combat and political missions. The political commissioners were tasked to teach communist ideologies to internal members of the Red Army, as well as propaganda tasks targeting the enemy by showing the Red Army as a righteous force.

In the People's Liberation Army (PLA), each level of the command has a dual-command structure, with a military organ and a Party organ. This collective leadership is held between the military commander (Chinese: 军事主官) and political commander (Chinese: 政治主官, i.e. the political commissar). The political commissar is always a uniformed military officer with both tactical and political training and Chinese Communist Party cadre. In the past, this position has been used to give civilian party officials some experience with the military.

Usually, the operational command organ has the military commander as the highest decision maker, while the political commissar serves as the second-in-command. As the deputy, political commissar are largely responsible for administrative tasks such as public relations, unit welfare, mental health, morale, and political education. The party organs are chaired by the political commissar, with the military commanders serving as the deputy secretaries. This framework ensures that both military and political officers can collectively design the goals and tasks of their respective units.

The role of the political commissar is not universal across different branches of the PLA. In the Ground Force (PLAGF), the political commissar is often second-in-command, while the military officer is responsible for the operation. Whereas in the Navy (PLAN), the political commissar and the Party committee are the supreme decision-makers, while military works are delegated to the operational commander as the second-in-command.

=== Republic of China ===
The position of political commissar (Chinese: 政戰官, literal translation "political warfare officer") also existed in the Republic of China Army of the Republic of China (Taiwan). Chiang Ching-kuo, appointed as Kuomintang (Chinese Nationalist Party) director of secret police in 1950, was educated in the Soviet Union, and initiated a Soviet-style military organization in the Republic of China Armed Forces, Sovietization of the political officer corps, surveillance, and Kuomintang party activities was propagated throughout the military. Opposed to this was General Sun Li-jen, who was educated at the American Virginia Military Institute. Chiang Ching-kuo then arrested Sun Li-jen, charging him of conspiring with the American Central Intelligence Agency of plotting to overthrow Chiang Kai-shek and the Kuomintang. Sun was placed under house arrest in 1955.

== Soviet Union and the Eastern Bloc ==
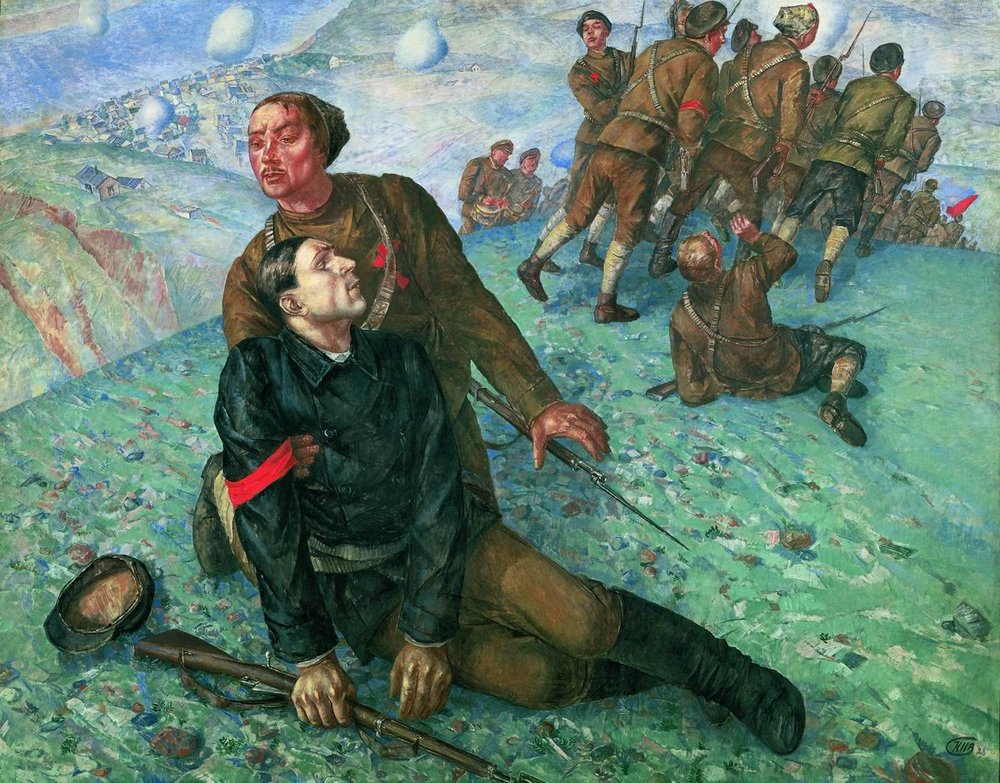
The death of the Political Commissar, 1928 propaganda painting by Kuzma Petrov-Vodkin

An early kind of political commissar was established during the February Revolution of 1917 as the Ispolkom issued the controversial Order no 1. As the Bolsheviks came to power through the October Revolution of November 1917, and as the Russian Civil War of 1917–1922 began, Leon Trotsky gradually established the Red Army and set up the role of political officers. They were tasked with making sure that communist parties could count on the loyalty of armed forces. Although there was a huge difference between the February Revolution and the October Revolution, their leaders in each case feared a counter-revolution, and both regarded the military officers as the most likely counter-revolutionary threat.

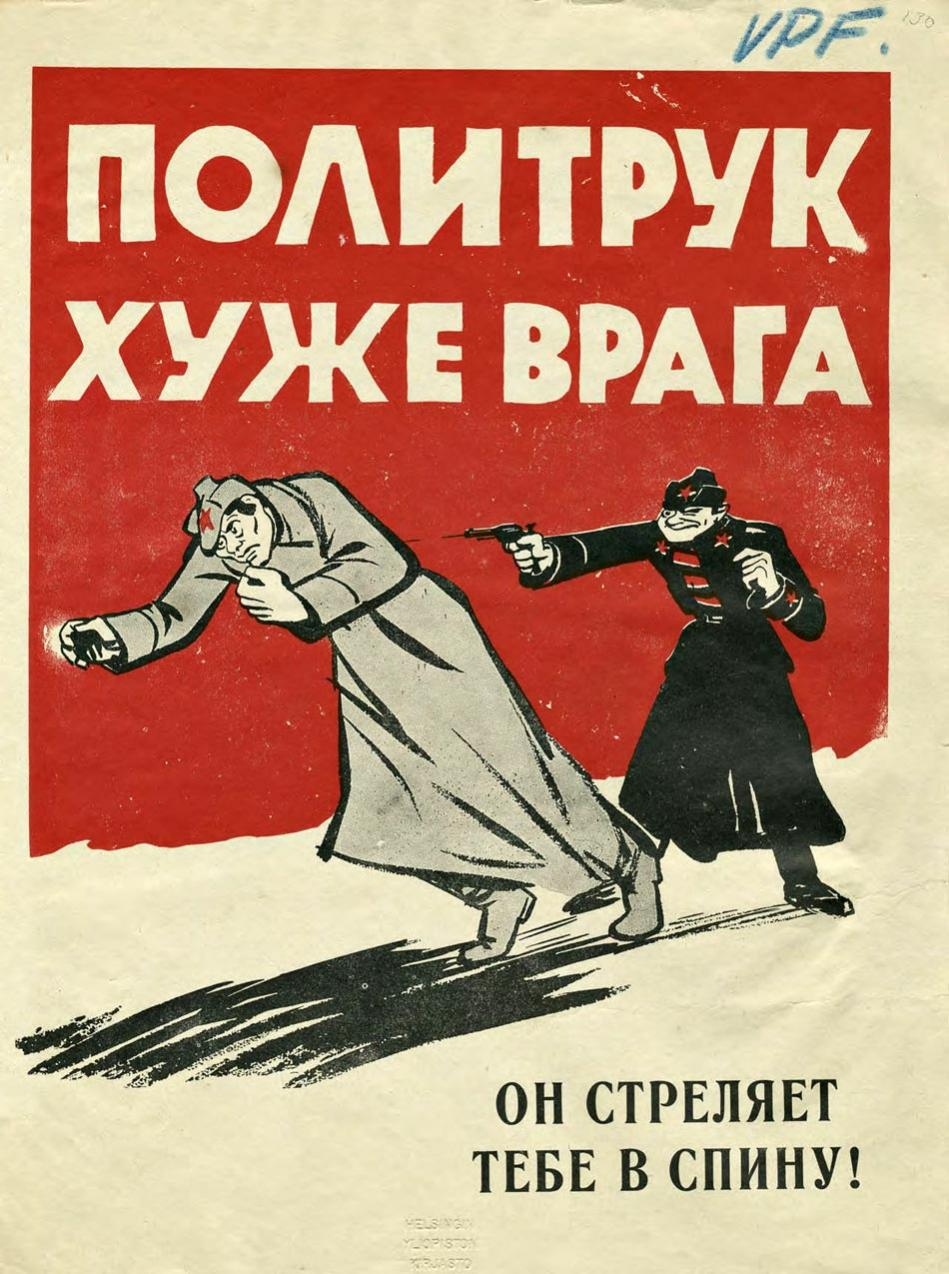
Finnish propaganda poster (1939–1940) aimed at Red Army soldiers: "Politruk: worse than the enemy. He shoots you in the back!"

Later commissars in the Eastern bloc could exercise broader roles in social engineering.

=== In the Soviet Union ===
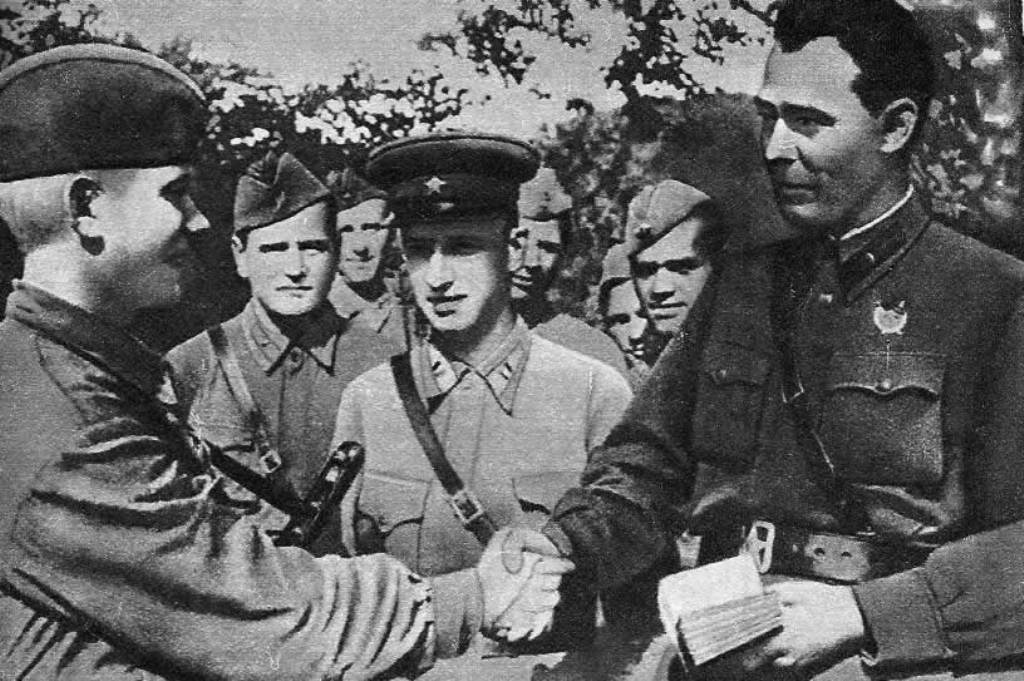
Leonid Brezhnev (right) in the rank of commissar giving a Communist Party membership card to a soldier (1942)

In the Red Army (1918–1946) and the Soviet Army (1946–1991), the political commissar (Russian: комиссар, romanized: komissar) existed, by name, only during the 1918–1924, 1937–1940, and 1941–1942 periods; not every Red Army political officer was a commissar. The political commissar held military rank equaling the unit commander to whom he was attached; moreover, the commissar also had the military authority to countermand the unit-commander's orders at any time. During the other periods of the Red Army's history political officers were militarily subordinate to unit commanders, and the position of political commissar did not exist.

The political supervision of the Russian military was effected by the political commissar, who was present in every unit and formation, from company- to division-level, including in the navy. Revolutionary Military Councils (or Revvoyensoviets, RVS) were established at army-, front-, fleet-, and flotilla-level, comprising at least three members—the commander and two political workers. The political workers were denominated "members of the RVS", not "commissars", despite their position as official political commissars.

In 1919, the title politruk (Russian: политрук, from политический руководитель, political leader) was assigned to political officers at company level. Despite their position as official political commissars, they were not addressed as "commissar". Beginning in 1925, the politico-military doctrinal course toward edinonachalie (Russian: единоначалие, single command) was established, and the political commissar, as a military institution, faded. The introduction of edinonachalie was two-fold, either the military commander joined the Communist Party and became his own unit's political officer, or a pompolit (Russian: помполит, assistant commander for political work) officer was commissioned sub-ordinate to him. Earlier, in 1924, the RVSs were renamed as Military Councils, and a high-level political officer became known as a ChVS (Chlen Voennogo Soveta, Member of the Military Council); they were abolished in 1934.

On 10 May 1937, the role of political commissar was reinstated in the Red Army, and Military Councils were set up. These derived from the political purges in the Soviet armed forces. Again, in August 1940, the office of political commissars was abolished, yet the Military Councils continued throughout the Second World War and after. Below army level, the edinonachalie (single-command) system was restored. In July 1941, consequent to the Red Army's defeats at the war's start, the position of political commissar reappeared. The commissars had an influential role as "second commanders" within the military units during this time. Their rank and insignia generally paralleled those of officers. Because this proved ineffective, General Ivan Konev asked Joseph Stalin to subordinate the political officer to commanding officers: the commissars' work was re-focused to morale-related functions. The term "commissar" was abolished in August 1942, and at the company- and regiment-level, the pompolit officer was replaced with the zampolit (deputy for political matters). Although no longer known by the original "commissar" title, political officers were retained by all the Soviet Armed Forces, e.g., Army, Navy, Air Force, Strategic Missile Troops, et al., until the dissolution of the Soviet Union in 1991.

In the officially atheist structures of the Soviet military, a political commissar had a role analogous to that of a religious chaplain.

==== Red Army rank designations ====
- Armeysky komissar 1-go ranga (Army Commissar 1st rank)
- Armeysky komissar 2-go ranga (Army Commissar 2nd rank)
- Korpusnoy komissar (Commissar of the corps)
- Divizionny komissar (Commissar of the division)
- Brigadny komissar (Commissar of the brigade)
- Polkovoy komissar (Commissar of the regiment)
- Starshi batalonny komissar (Senior commissar of the battalion)
- Batalonny komissar (Commissar of the battalion)
- Starshy politruk (Senior politleader)
- Politruk (Politleader)
- Mladshy politruk (Junior politleader)

=== Eastern Bloc armies ===
After World War II, other Eastern Bloc armies also used political officers patterned on the Soviet model. For example, East Germany's National People's Army used Politoffiziere as the unit commander's deputy responsible for political education. During the Korean War, the Korean People's Army commissars were known as "Cultural Sections" or "Political Sections".

== Second Spanish Republic ==
During the Spanish Civil War, the Spanish Republican Army and International Brigades heavily used political officers. The Spanish Commissariat of War was created four months after the beginning of the war. The idea for political commissars in the Spanish Republican Army came from the commissaire politique of the French Revolutionary Army during the French Revolutionary Wars. The role of the commissar was to give to soldiers morale, political instruction, and inspiration.

== See also ==
- Représentant en mission
- Cadre (military)
- Commissar Order
- Military commissariat
