= Gutian Congress =

1929 Congress of the 4th Chinese Red Army

Coordinates: 25.2228°N 116.8328°E

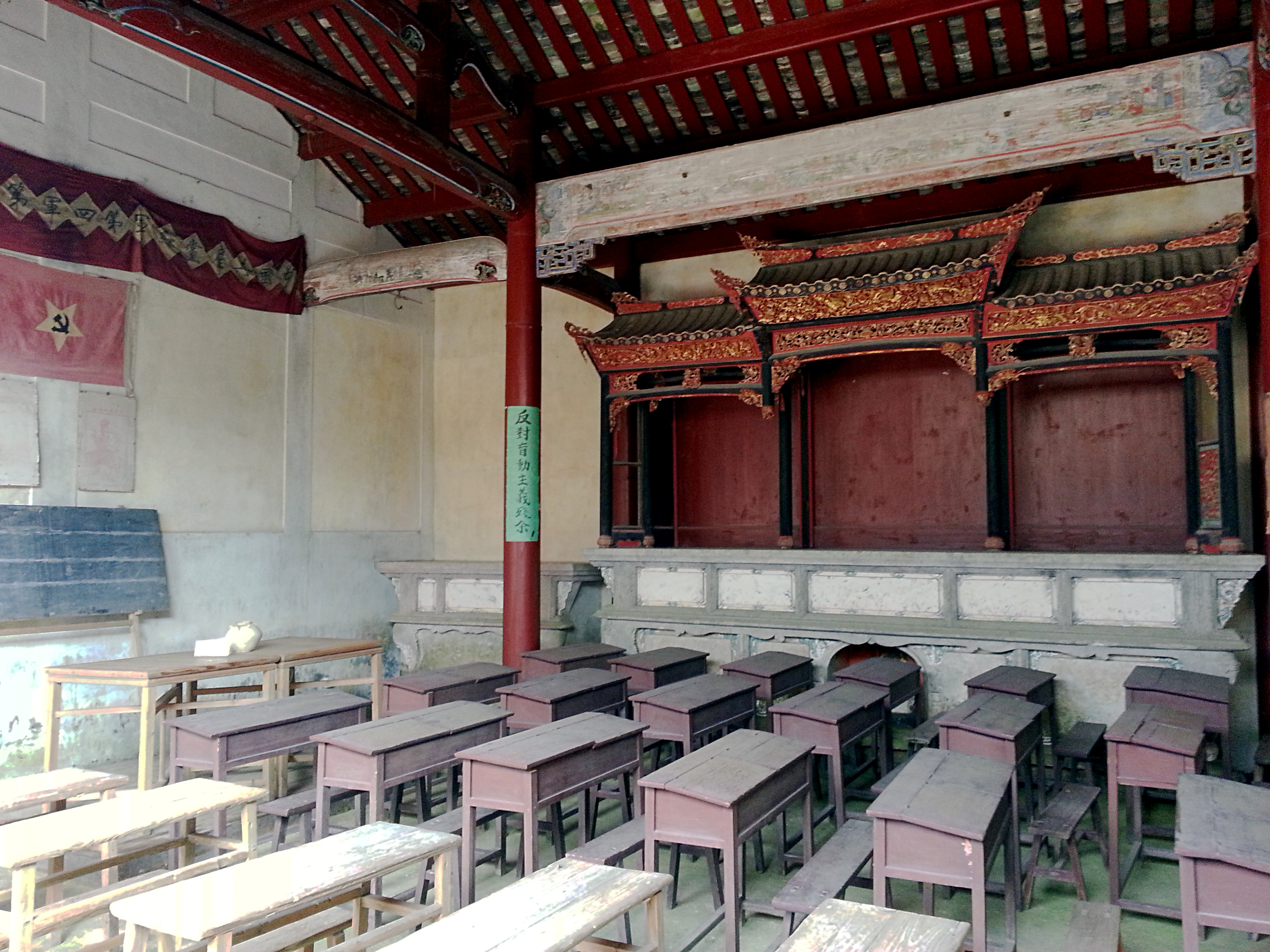
Classroom where the meeting was held.

The Gutian Congress or Gutian Conference (simplified Chinese: 古田会议; traditional Chinese: 古田會議; pinyin: Gǔtián huìyì) was the 9th meeting of the 4th Red Army and the first after the Nanchang Uprising and the subsequent southward flight of the rebel troops. It was convened in December 1929 in the town of Gutian in Shanghang County, Fujian Province.

The Gutian Congress was important in establishing the principle of absolute party control over the military, which continues to be a core principle of the ideology of the Chinese Communist Party and the organization of the People's Liberation Army.

== Conference ==
On behalf of the Central Committee of the Chinese Communist Party in September 1929, Zhou Enlai wrote a letter to the 4th Red Army affirming Mao Zedong's view of an armed division composed of workers and peasants. The letter emphasized the principle, "First is the Red Army, and later urban political power. This is characteristic of the Chinese revolution, which is a product of China's economic foundation." It described the Red Army's basic tasks as "1) mobilizing mass struggle, implementing the agrarian revolution, and establishing the soviet regime, 2) implementing guerilla warfare, arming the peasants, expanding its own organization, and 3) expanding the guerilla's territory and political influence throughout the entire country."

Acting on this letter, in December 1929 the 4th Army of the Chinese Workers' and Peasants' Red Army held its 9th Party Congress at Gutian.

Most of the delegates to this congress were army men. Mao, voted out six months earlier but moving from his success at the Jiaoyang Congress (also in Shanghang), addressed the Zhu-Mao 4th Army (朱毛四军) as its Comintern-anointed political commissar and chaired the congress. Mao emphasized the importance of a politically and ideologically aligned military to the success of the Chinese Communist Party (CCP). Mao stated that the Red Army was "an armed group that carries out the political work of the revolution" and that "[i]n addition to fighting to destroy the enemy's power, it must also bear the burden of propagating, organizing, and arming the masses and helping them establish revolutionary regimes and even build the Communist Party." According to Mao, "This is the whole purpose behind winning the war, and the very purpose for which the army exists."

The resolution adopted following the congress (the Gutian Congress Resolution or 古田会议决议) also emphasized the connection between war and politics, including the class nature of war. According to the resolution, the CCP's leading organs in the army must become "the central leadership" and that all major issues discussed at Party Committee meetings must be "resolutely implemented". The Resolution stated that the Red Army must be organized democratically. The Resolution also called for the criticism of what was seen as excessive democratic deliberation and discussion in the fighting force ("ultra-democracy"), preferring democratic centralism whereby the minority agreed to abide by the decisions of the majority, lower levels unquestioningly implemented decisions made by the leadership, and that mistaken ideas must be "corrected through ideological criticism." Mao drafted the Resolution.

== Legacy ==
The congress was important in establishing the principle of absolute party control over the military, which continues to be a core principle of the ideology of the Chinese Communist Party. The congress established a system of political commissars in the Chinese Red Army, which continues inside the People's Liberation Army. In the short term, this concept was further developed in the June 1930 Program for the Red Fourth Army at All Levels and the winter 1930 Provisional Regulations on the Political Work of the Chinese Workers and Peasants Army (Draft), which formally established Party leadership of the military.

Historian Gao Hua considered the Gutian Conference as crucial in establishing the conditions that allowed for Mao's authority over the Jiangxi Soviet area, namely the CCP Central Committee's explicit support. This authority would prove powerful in Mao's future efforts to seize control of the CCP writ large.

The principles in the Guitan Congress Resolution were part of the development of the mass line.

One of the selections from the Gutian Congress Resolution later included in Mao's Little Red Book is as follows:

In the sphere of theory, destroy the roots of ultra-democracy. First, it should be pointed out that the danger of ultra-democracy lies in the fact that it damages or even completely wrecks the Party organisation and weakens or even completely undermines the Party's fighting capacity, rendering the Party incapable of fulfilling its fighting tasks and thereby causing the defeat of the revolution. Next it should be pointed out that the source of ultra-democracy consists in the petty bourgeoisie's individualistic aversion to discipline. When this characteristic is brought into the Party, it develops into ultra-democratic ideas politically and organisationally. These ideas are utterly incompatible with the fighting tasks of the proletariat.

In 2014, General Secretary of the Chinese Communist Party Xi Jinping convened a Military Political Work Conference with 420 military officials at Gutian (sometimes referred to as the "New Gutian Conference") in order to emphasize the principles established at the 1929 Gutian Congress. The New Gutian Conference focused on political work and Party control of the PLA, not military operations or strategy. Xi reaffirmed the principle that "the Party commands the Gun" and highlighted the significance of political work in military development. During the New Gutian Conference, Xi Jinping stated that cyber conflict was one of the main areas of military competition for the PLA and described the PLA as needing to overcome its "ostrich" attitude and rigid ways of thinking in this area. According to Xi's remarks, "Currently some work is not at all suitable for the requirements of the cyber era, and it is already increasingly clear that ideas and concepts and work methods are lacking in this age".

== See also ==
- Zunyi Conference
