= Nanyang, Shanghang County =

Nanyang 南阳镇
- Town
- Location in Fujian
- Coordinates: 25.3148°N 116.5021°E
- Country: People's Republic of China
- Province: Fujian
- Prefecture-level city: Longyan
- County: Shanghang County
- Time zone: UTC+8 (China Standard)

Nanyang (simplified Chinese: 南阳; traditional Chinese: 南陽) is a Town in Shanghang County, Longyan, Fujian.

== Administration ==
The town executive, party subbranch and police substation (paichusuo, 派出所) are in Shaxiaba (沙下坝). The town oversees twenty official villages:

- Shuangxi (双溪)
- Sheshan (射山)
- Haodong (豪东)
- Jitou (矶头)
- Xiache (下车)
- Xukeng (涂坑)
- Mayangdong (马洋洞)
- Nankeng (南坑)
- Nanyang (南阳)
- Gongyu (官余)
- Xinlian (新联)
- Luofang (罗坊)
- Huangfang (黄坊)
- Chaxi (茶溪)
- Lianyi (联义)
- Rixin (日新)
- Zhuxie (朱斜)
- Lianshan (联山)
- Xiangta (香塔)
- Nanling (南岭)
