= Reply to Li Shuyi =

Poem written by Mao Zedong

Reply to Li Shuyi (Chinese: 答李淑一) is a poem written on May 11, 1957 by Mao Zedong to Li Shuyi, a friend of Mao's first wife Yang Kaihui and the widow of the executed Communist leader Liu Zhixun. In the poem, "poplar" refers to Yang Kaihui, whose surname Yang means "poplar", and who also had been executed; and "willow" is the literal meaning of Liu's surname. Wu Gang is a man who, according to Chinese legend, lives on the moon, and was forced by the gods to fell a laurel tree forever.

Original Chinese

我失骄杨君失柳
杨柳轻扬直上重霄九
问讯吴刚何所有
吴刚捧出桂花酒

寂寞嫦娥舒广袖
万里长空且为忠魂舞
忽报人间曾伏虎
泪飞顿作倾盆雨

Pinyin

Wǒ shī jiāo yáng jūn shī liǔ
Yáng liǔ qīng yáng zhí shàng chóng xiāo jiǔ
Wèn xùn wú gāng hé suǒ yǒu
Wú gāng pěng chū guì huā jiǔ

Jì mò cháng'é shū guǎng xiù
Wàn lǐ cháng kōng qiě wèi zhōng hún wǔ
Hū bào rén jiān céng fú hǔ
Lèi fēi dùn zuò qīng pén yǔ

Schram's English Translation

I lost my proud poplar, and you your willow,
Poplar and willow soar lightly to the heaven of heavens.
Wu Kang, asked what he has to offer,
Presents them respectfully with cassia wine.

The lonely goddess in the moon spreads her ample sleeves
To dance for these faithful souls in the endless sky.
Of a sudden comes word of the tiger's defeat on earth,
And they break into tears of torrential rain.

Barnstone's English Translation

I lost my proud poplar and you your willow.
As poplar and willow they soar straight up
into the ninth heaven
and ask the prisoner of the moon, Wu Gang, what is there.
He offers them wine from the cassia tree.

The lonely lady on the moon, Chang E,
spreads her vast sleeves
and dances for these good souls in the unending sky.
Down on earth a sudden report of the tiger's defeat.
Tears fly down from a great upturned bowl of rain.
