= Changsha (poem) =

1925 poem by Mao Zedong

- Traditional Chinese: 沁園春·長沙
- Simplified Chinese: 沁园春·长沙
Transcriptions
Standard Mandarin
- Hanyu Pinyin: Qìnyuánchūn - Chángshā
Yue: Cantonese
- Jyutping: Sam^{3} Jyun^{4} Ceon^{1} - Coeng^{4} Saa^{1}

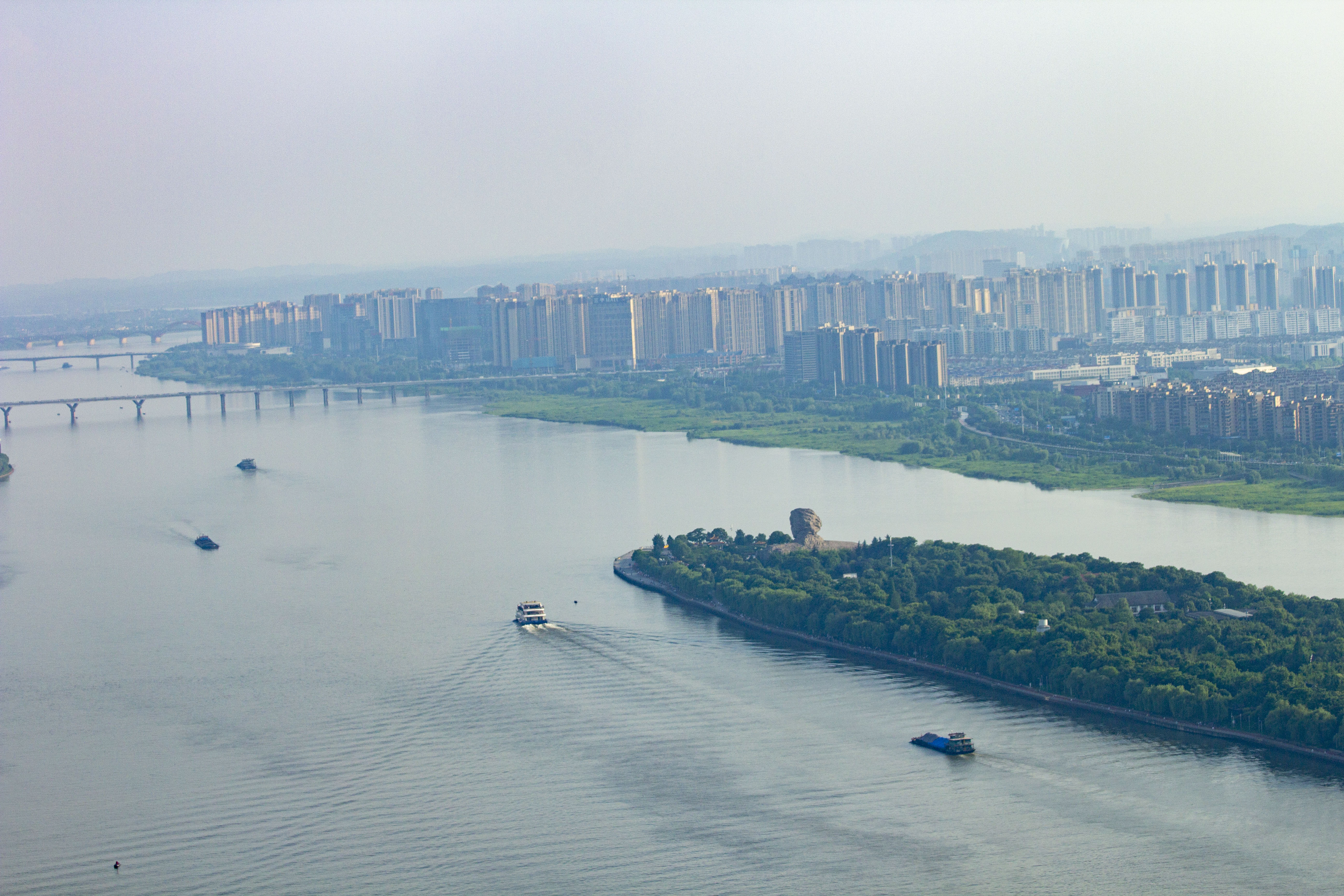
A statue of Mao was completed in 2009 in Orange Isle to mimic the scenario in the poem.

"Changsha" (Chinese: 沁园春·长沙) is a poem written by Mao Zedong in 1925. It was written in the shen yuan chun form for both Changsha and for his other major poem Snow.

== See also ==
- Changsha
