= Tingzhou Prefecture =

Administrative division of Fujian (1368 - 1913)

Tingzhou Prefecture Changting
- Prefecture
- Location of Tingzhou Prefecture in Fujian Province, 1820
- Coordinates: 25°41′N 116°20′E

Tingzhou Prefecture (Chinese: 汀州府) was a prefecture in Fujian province from the Tang dynasty (唐朝) down to the early 20th century, when it was renamed Changting (simplified Chinese: 长汀; traditional Chinese: 長汀; pinyin: Chángtīng).

== History ==
As early as 3,000 to 4,000 years ago, the She people thrived along the Tingjiang river (汀江), which originates in the north and runs through the county toward the south, and enters the South China Sea in Shantou (汕头), Guangdong (广东) province. Since early history, the Tingjiang river has been serving as an important water path for travel and, more importantly, the shipping of goods between coastal areas and mountainous terrain. It was said that the early Hakka ancestors traveled from north through the same path to Guangdong and the other parts of China and overseas, so Tingjiang river also gained its name as "Hakka's Mother River".

=== Imperial ===
During the Han dynasty, county-level administration was established where Changting county is currently seated. To take on immigrating northerners, the Tingzhou Prefecture (汀州府) prefecture administration was set up in the 24th reign-year of the Tang emperor Kaiyuan, i.e. 736 CE.

Since then and until the end of Qing dynasty(清朝), Changting had been where Zhou(州), Jun(郡), Lu(路) and Fu(府) (all prefectural level administrations) were located, and economic and political center of western Fujian(福建). During the Ming and Qing dynasties (明清朝), Tingzhou Prefecture encompassed eight counties including Changting (长汀), Ninghua (宁化), often regarded as very first settlement place for Hakka people), Qingliu (清流), Guihua (归化, obsolete), Liancheng (连城), Shanghang (上杭), Wuping (武平) and Yongding (永定). Being the first such territory set up by administration for migrant resettlement and one of the main concentration places for Hakka people, Tingzhou vies with Meixian (Mei County) in nearby eastern Guangdong in being referred to as the "Capital of the Hakkas"(客家首府). Today many Hakkas can trace their origins back to Tingzhou.

=== Revolution Era ===
Tingzhou was renamed "Changting" (长汀) in the 2nd year of the Republic of China, i.e. 1913 (Year Two of the Chinese Republic). During Chinese Civil War, the prefecture was the economic and financial centre of the Chinese Soviet Republic. Tens of thousands of people from "Changting" joined the Chinese Red Army - but not many survived the Long March.

With the founding of the People's Republic of China, the Prefecture was renamed again ("Longyan" 龙岩地区) and—minus several counties—its political center was relocated to Xinluo.

The former prefecture seat --"Tingzhou Town" (汀州镇)—now only a shiretown (or "county-town", 县城), commemorates the imperial-era prefecture. The name of its reduced purview --Changting County (长汀)—recalls the prefecture in its ROC years.

Real reorganisation only came in the early years of the People's Republic (1949-- ), which established a Diqu (地区, "region") --since upgraded to the Diji Shi (地级市, "prefecture-level city")-- called Longyan. Two counties of the Imperial- and Republican eras, Ninghua and Qingliu, were detached. The remaining seven have henceforth been administered from a new centre, Xinluo (新罗), which is more accessible to the province's heavily populated coast.

== Note on Usage ==
By Chinese convention the prefectural name would also refer, depending on context, to the city which was the seat of its government. Thus Mao Zedong's Red Army column is said to have taken Changting in 1929, meaning that his column exercised real control over what is now Tingzhou town.

== Notable individuals from Changting ==
- Yang Chengwu (杨成武), 1914-2004 Revolutionarian and General of People's Liberation Army
- Chen Pixian (陈丕显), 1916-1995 Revolutionarian and CPC official
- Fu Lianzhang (傅连璋), 1894-1968 Christian, practitioner of western medicine, Long March veteran, PRC Health Ministry official and Cultural Revolution victim.
