= Changting County =

Changting County 长汀县 Tingzhou
- County
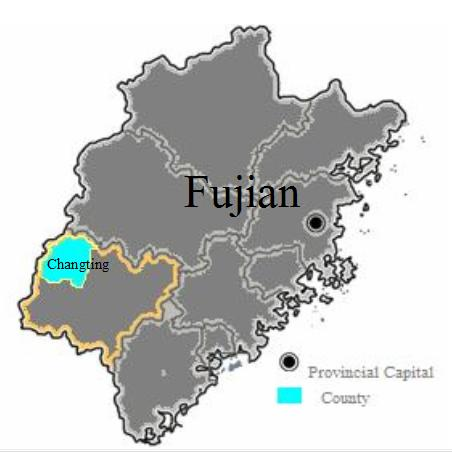
- Location of Changting in Fujian
- Coordinates: 25°41′N 116°20′E
- Country: People's Republic of China
- Province: Fujian
- Prefecture-level city: Longyan
- County seat: Tingzhou

Area
  - County: 3,099 km^{2} (1,197 sq mi)

Population (2020)
  - County: 397,470
  - Density: 128.3/km^{2} (332.2/sq mi)
  - Urban: 212,617
- Time zone: UTC+8 (China Standard)
- Website: www.changting.gov.cn

Changting (Changting; simplified Chinese: 长汀; traditional Chinese: 長汀; pinyin: Chángtīng; Hakka: Tshòng-tin), also known as Tingzhou or Tingchow (汀州; Tīngzhōu), is a county in western Fujian province, People's Republic of China. With a population of 397,470 in 2020 and an area of 3,099 square kilometres (1,197 sq mi), Changting is one of the largest counties in the province. The majority of the population belongs to the Hakka people and speaks Changting dialect, a dialect of Hakka Chinese. The Changting dialect is mutually unintelligible with the Meixian dialect, which is another Hakka language spoken in Guangdong.

The county seat is the town of Tingzhou.

== History ==
Confucius Temple, Town of Tingzhou

=== Pre-modern era ===
Changting was originally the name of a prefecture (called Tingzhou in imperial times), established in the second year of the Republic of China - 1913.

=== Jiangxi Soviet ===
Flag of the Jiangxi Soviet

During the early stages of the Chinese Civil War, this prefecture was part of the economic and financial centre of the Chinese Soviet Republic (the Jiangxi Soviet). Tens of thousands of people from Changting joined the Chinese Red Army but not many survived the Long March.

=== Post-Mao era ===
With the founding of the People's Republic of China, the prefecture was redesignated "Longyan" (龙岩地区) and its government was moved down to Xinluo. Changting has since been the name of a county only, within the municipal region of Longyan.

With the prosperity of road and railway transportation and more and more dams built along the river, Ting River gradually lost its advantage as a vital transportation means. Changting, once an important concentration place for travellers and goods, became isolated by big mountains. Changting lost its place as the center of western Fujian and became one of the poorest counties in Fujian province.

Today, the situation has improved a lot with first railroad in service in 2005 and first highway in service at the end of 2007.

== Education ==
- Changting No.1 Middle School in Tingzhou

Changting No.1 Middle School, Town of Tingzhou

== Geography ==
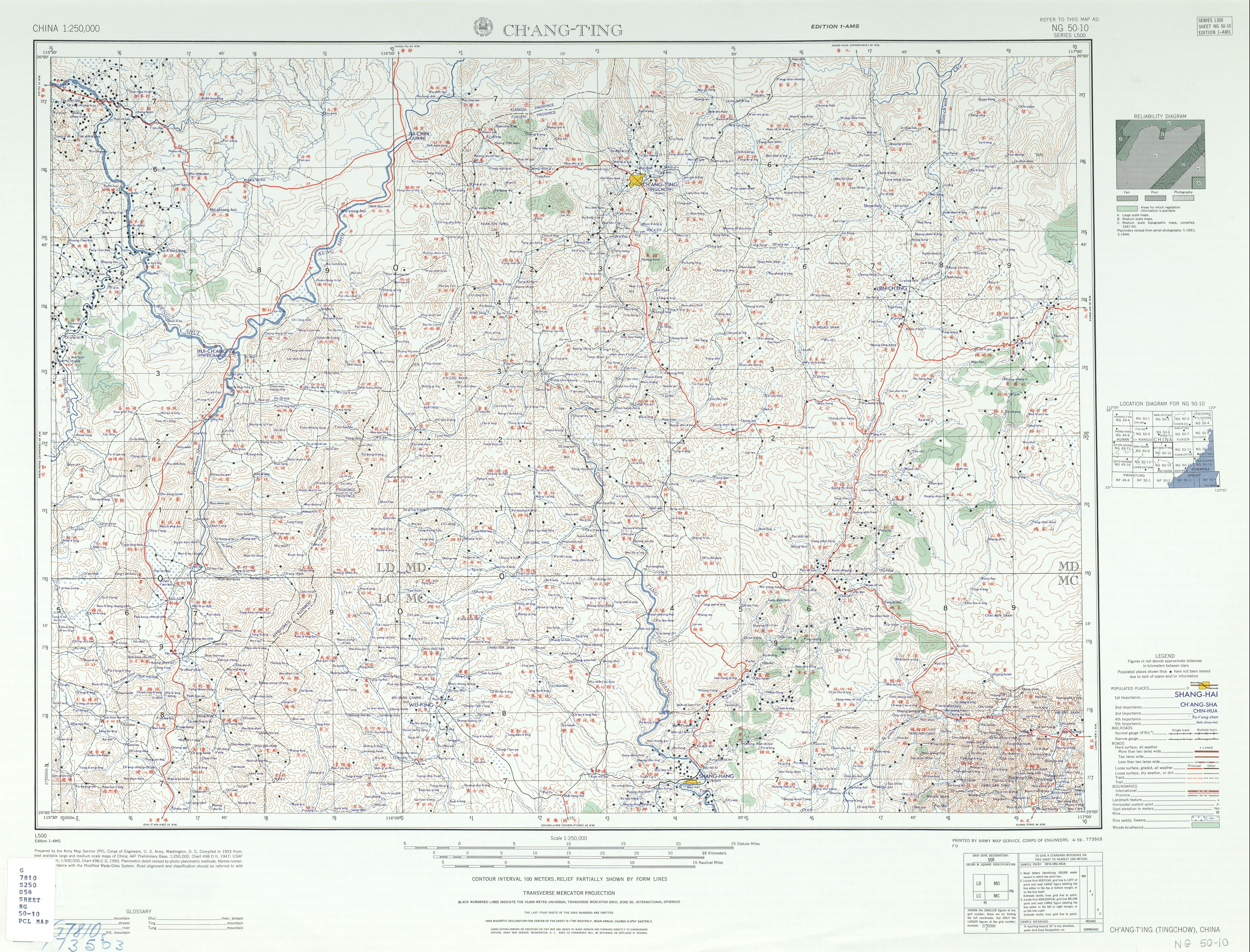
Map of Changting (labeled as CH'ANG-T'ING 長汀 (TINGCHOW)) and surrounding region (1953)

Changting borders Liancheng County to the east, Wuping and Shanghang counties to the south (all in Longyan municipality), Sanming municipality's Ninghua County to the north, Ganzhou municipality's Ruijin City in Jiangxi province to the west.

Located in the southern end of the Wuyi Mountains (武夷山脉), Changting belongs to subtropical zone. The region enjoys abundant precipitation as the warm maritime air meets the cool air in the mountains, generating a large amount of rainfall.

== Climate ==
Climate data for Changting, elevation 310 m (1,020 ft), (1991–2020 normals, extremes 1981–present)
| Month | Jan | Feb | Mar | Apr | May | Jun | Jul | Aug | Sep | Oct | Nov | Dec | Year |
|---|---|---|---|---|---|---|---|---|---|---|---|---|---|
| Record high °C (°F) | 27.0 (80.6) | 30.6 (87.1) | 32.2 (90.0) | 34.5 (94.1) | 34.4 (93.9) | 36.6 (97.9) | 39.5 (103.1) | 38.6 (101.5) | 36.3 (97.3) | 35.9 (96.6) | 32.9 (91.2) | 27.0 (80.6) | 39.5 (103.1) |
| Mean daily maximum °C (°F) | 14.3 (57.7) | 16.5 (61.7) | 19.3 (66.7) | 24.6 (76.3) | 28.1 (82.6) | 30.5 (86.9) | 33.2 (91.8) | 32.7 (90.9) | 30.4 (86.7) | 26.6 (79.9) | 22.0 (71.6) | 16.5 (61.7) | 24.6 (76.2) |
| Daily mean °C (°F) | 8.5 (47.3) | 10.9 (51.6) | 14.2 (57.6) | 19.4 (66.9) | 23.1 (73.6) | 25.7 (78.3) | 27.4 (81.3) | 27.0 (80.6) | 24.7 (76.5) | 20.3 (68.5) | 15.4 (59.7) | 10.0 (50.0) | 18.9 (66.0) |
| Mean daily minimum °C (°F) | 4.9 (40.8) | 7.3 (45.1) | 10.8 (51.4) | 15.7 (60.3) | 19.5 (67.1) | 22.4 (72.3) | 23.3 (73.9) | 23.3 (73.9) | 20.8 (69.4) | 15.8 (60.4) | 11.0 (51.8) | 5.8 (42.4) | 15.1 (59.1) |
| Record low °C (°F) | −6.0 (21.2) | −3.4 (25.9) | −3.4 (25.9) | 3.4 (38.1) | 8.2 (46.8) | 12.4 (54.3) | 18.5 (65.3) | 16.8 (62.2) | 10.7 (51.3) | 2.9 (37.2) | −1.8 (28.8) | −8.0 (17.6) | −8.0 (17.6) |
| Average precipitation mm (inches) | 70.5 (2.78) | 103.2 (4.06) | 196.8 (7.75) | 206.4 (8.13) | 272.8 (10.74) | 307.1 (12.09) | 142.6 (5.61) | 195.1 (7.68) | 79.6 (3.13) | 46.3 (1.82) | 60.3 (2.37) | 54.1 (2.13) | 1,734.8 (68.29) |
| Average precipitation days (≥ 0.1 mm) | 10.8 | 12.9 | 18.4 | 17.1 | 18.1 | 18.5 | 14.4 | 16.3 | 9.7 | 6.1 | 7.6 | 7.8 | 157.7 |
| Average snowy days | 0.7 | 0.5 | 0.1 | 0 | 0 | 0 | 0 | 0 | 0 | 0 | 0 | 0.3 | 1.6 |
| Average relative humidity (%) | 79 | 80 | 83 | 81 | 82 | 83 | 78 | 80 | 79 | 77 | 78 | 77 | 80 |
| Mean monthly sunshine hours | 95.2 | 84.6 | 75.7 | 93.7 | 108.3 | 115.7 | 207.7 | 190.2 | 167.1 | 169.7 | 144.6 | 131.2 | 1,583.7 |
| Percentage possible sunshine | 29 | 27 | 20 | 24 | 26 | 28 | 50 | 48 | 46 | 48 | 45 | 40 | 36 |
Source: China Meteorological Administration

== Administration ==
The county executive, legislature and judiciary are in Tingzhou Town, together with the CPC and PSB branches.

=== Towns (镇, zhen) ===
- Tingzhou (汀州) - the county seat
- Guanqian (馆前)
- Hetian (河田)
- Gucheng (古城)
- Tongfang (童坊)
- Xinqiao (新桥)
- Nanshan (南山)
- Zhuotian (濯田)
- Sidu (四都)
- Datong (大同)
- Tufang (涂坊)

=== Township (乡, xiang) ===
- Anjie (庵杰)
- Cewu (策武)
- Sanzhou (三洲)
- Tiechang (铁长)
- Yanggu (羊牯)
- Xuancheng (宣成)
- Hongshan (红山)

== Notable natives ==
(i.e., of Tingzhou/Changting Prefecture and of PRC's Changting County):

- Yang Chengwu (杨成武), 1914-2004 Revolutionarian and General of People's Liberation Army
- Chen Pixian (陈丕显), 1916-1995 Revolutionarian and CPC official
- Fu Lianzhang (傅连璋), 1894-1968 Christian, practitioner of western medicine, Long March veteran, PRC Health Ministry official and Cultural Revolution victim.
- Bei Cun (北村) (1965-), avant-garde Christian novelist.
- Chen Hong (陈宏) (1979-), number 1 badminton player on the world ranking list from 2002 to 2003.

== See also ==
- Hakka people
- Hakka (language)
