= Rentian, Fujian =

Rentian 稔田镇
- Town
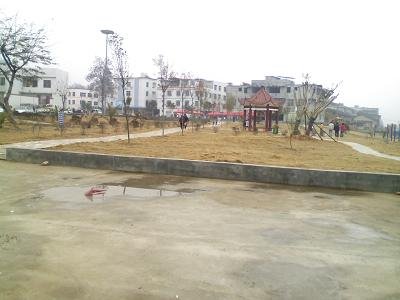

- Location in Fujian Rentian (China)
- Coordinates: 24°51′05″N 116°36′02″E
- Country: People's Republic of China
- Province: Fujian
- Prefecture-level city: Longyan
- County: Shanghang

Area
  - Total: 147.61 km^{2} (56.99 sq mi)

Population (2018)
  - Total: 24,985
  - Density: 169.26/km^{2} (438.39/sq mi)
- Time zone: UTC+8 (China Standard)

Rentian (Chinese: 稔田; pinyin: Rěntián; Wade–Giles: R’en-tian), formerly known as Taiping (Chinese: 太平; pinyin: Tàipíng; Wade–Giles: T’ai-p’ing), is a town in Shanghang County, Longyan, in southwestern Fujian province, China. The town spans an area of 147.61 kilometres (91.72 mi), and has a hukou population of 24,985 as of 2018.

== Geography ==
The town is bordered by Lanxi to the north and Xiadu to the south. The Huangtan River runs through the town. 76.9% of the town is forested.

== Administration ==
The town administers 18 administrative villages:

- Taihu (Chinese: 太湖村)
- Huahou (Chinese: 化厚村)
- Zhutian (Chinese: 祝田村)
- Shipai (Chinese: 石牌村)
- Dayan (Chinese: 大燕村)
- Nankeng (Chinese: 南坑村)
- Yekeng (Chinese: 叶坑村)
- Caikeng (Chinese: 蔡坑村)
- Guantian (Chinese: 官田村)
- Meizhen (Chinese: 梅镇村)
- Changtan (Chinese: 长滩村)
- Butou (Chinese: 埔头村)
- Liansi (Chinese: 连四村)
- Fenglang (Chinese: 丰朗村)
- Lougang (Chinese: 楼岗村)
- Fengshan (Chinese: 枫山村)
- Zhenqi (Chinese: 镇歧村)
- Qikeng (Chinese: 歧坑村)

== Economy ==
As of 2018, the town's primary sector totaled ¥425 million, the secondary sector totaled ¥253 million, and the tertiary sector totaled ¥1.019 billion.

Mineral resources in the town include molybdenum, iron, rare earth elements, manganese, and kaolinite.

Rentian's major crops include pomelo, lemon, and camellia.

== Culture ==
Many of the town's inhabitants are Hakka, with the six prominent Hakka clans in the town being the Liu (Chinese: 李), the You (Chinese: 游), the Huang (Chinese: 黄), the Liu (Chinese: 刘), the Qiu (Chinese: 邱), and the Chen (Chinese: 陈).

== Transportation ==
Fujian Provincial Highway 309 runs north to south thru the town.

== Notable people ==
- Liu Yongsheng, People's Liberation Army General

== Notes and references ==
- Rentian, Fujian at GEOnet Names Server
