= John Lesinski =

John Lesinski may refer to:

- John Lesinski Sr. (1885-1950), U.S. Representative from Michigan
- John Lesinski Jr. (1914-2005), U.S. Representative from Michigan

== See also ==
- T. John Lesinski, politician and jurist from Wayne County, Michigan
