= Tingzhou, Longyan =

Town in Fujian Province, China

Tingzhou 汀州镇
- Town
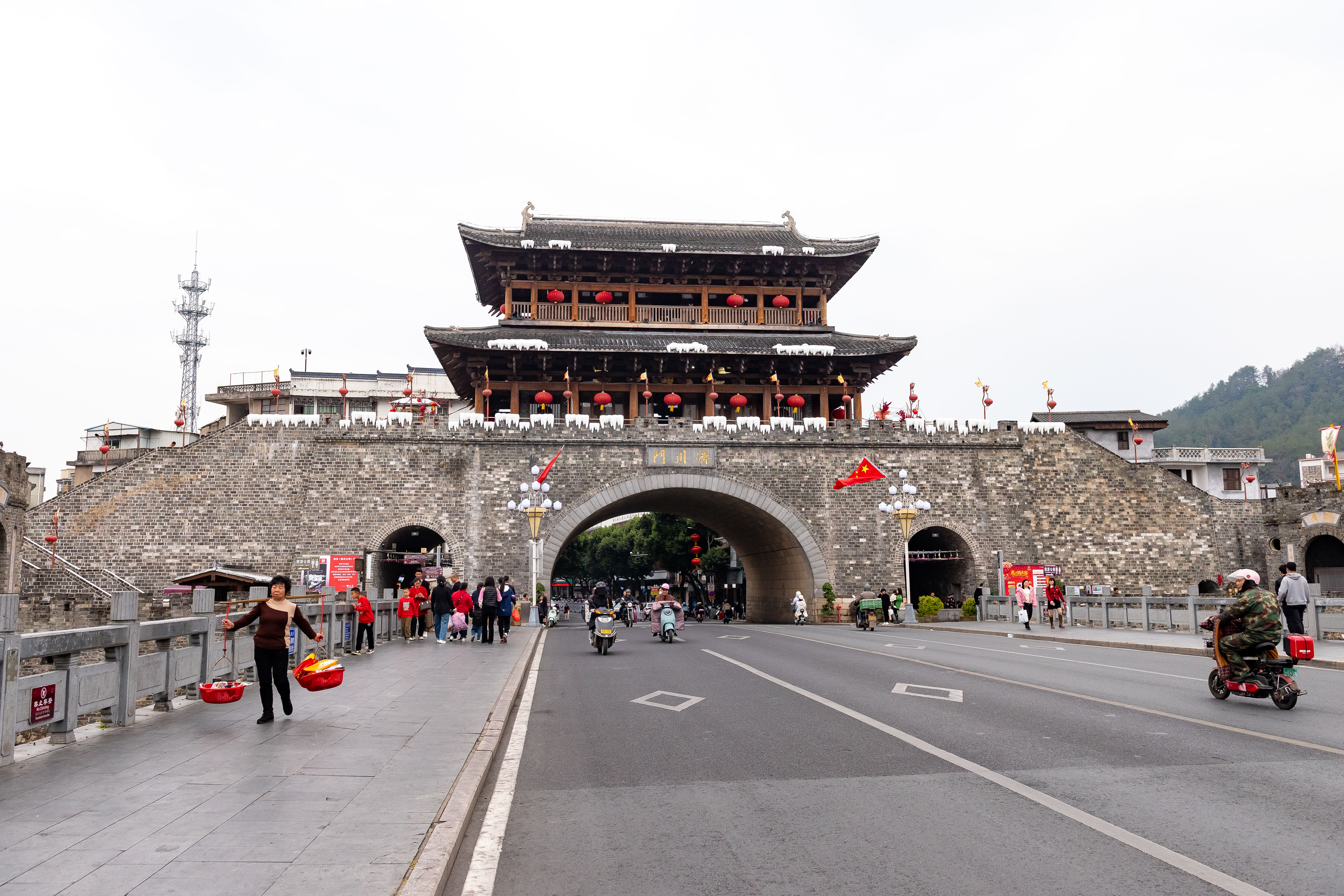
- Jichuanmen within the town, 2025

- Location in Fujian
- Country: People's Republic of China
- Province: Fujian
- Prefecture-level city: Longyan
- County: Changting County
- Time zone: UTC+8 (China Standard)

The town of Tingzhou (汀州镇) is the seat of the Changting County, Longyan government, Party and police.

== History ==
For information on Tingzhou Town's colorful past, see the wiki pages on the county it seats and on the former prefecture it seated. In early April 1932, Mao Zedong, Zhou Enlai and others held a military conference to attack Zhangzhou at the Church of Christ in China.

=== Reference of Place-name ===
The county town bears the name of the large pre-Republican prefecture which it long administered; Tingzhou fu encompassed Ninghua and Qingliu counties in Sanming municipality as well as the entirety of Longyan.

== Religion ==
The town is the seat of a modest cathedral built by Roman Catholic bishop Johann Lesinski. To this day the territory of the Imperial-era prefecture Tingzhou fu remains, in the eyes of the Holy See, a diocese under the Metropolitan at Fuzhou. The cathedral has no such status though under the Patriotic Catholic administration, and in fact is little used even as a church.
