= Shanghang County =

Shanghang County 上杭县
- County
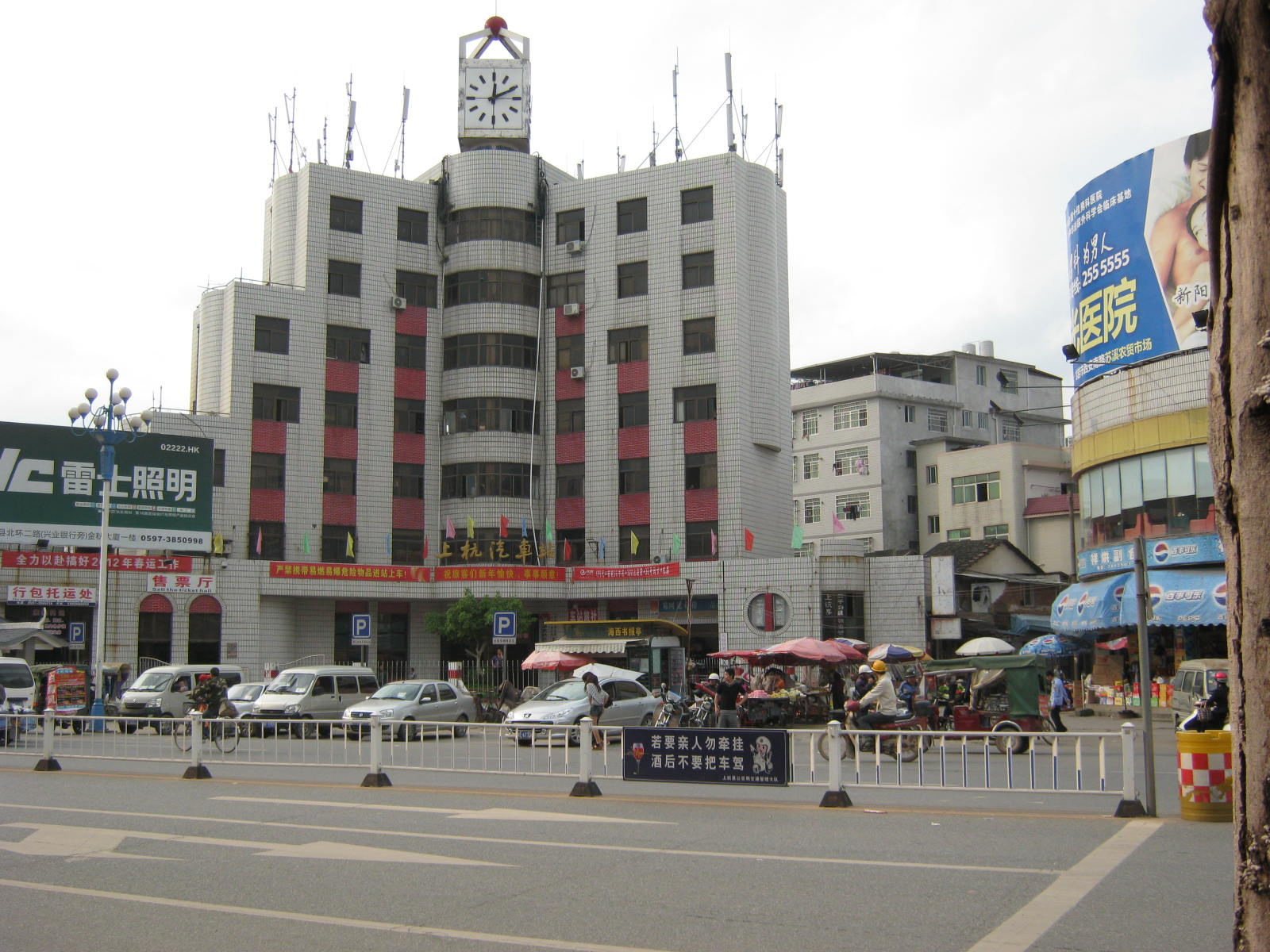
- Shanghang long-distance bus station

- Location of the seat in Fujian
- Coordinates: 25°02′58″N 116°25′12″E
- Country: People's Republic of China
- Province: Fujian
- Prefecture-level city: Longyan

Area
  - County: 2,855 km^{2} (1,102 sq mi)

Population (2020)
  - County: 376,392
  - Density: 131.8/km^{2} (341.5/sq mi)
  - Urban: 193,718 (51.2%)
  - Rural: 182,674 (48.5%)
- Time zone: UTC+8 (China Standard)

Shanghang (simplified Chinese: 上杭县; traditional Chinese: 上杭縣; pinyin: Shàngháng Xiàn; Pe̍h-ōe-jī: Siôngháng Gnuâi; Hakka: Sông-hông-yen) is a county in southwest Fujian Province, China, bordering Guangdong Province to the southwest. It is under the administration of the prefecture-level city of Longyan.

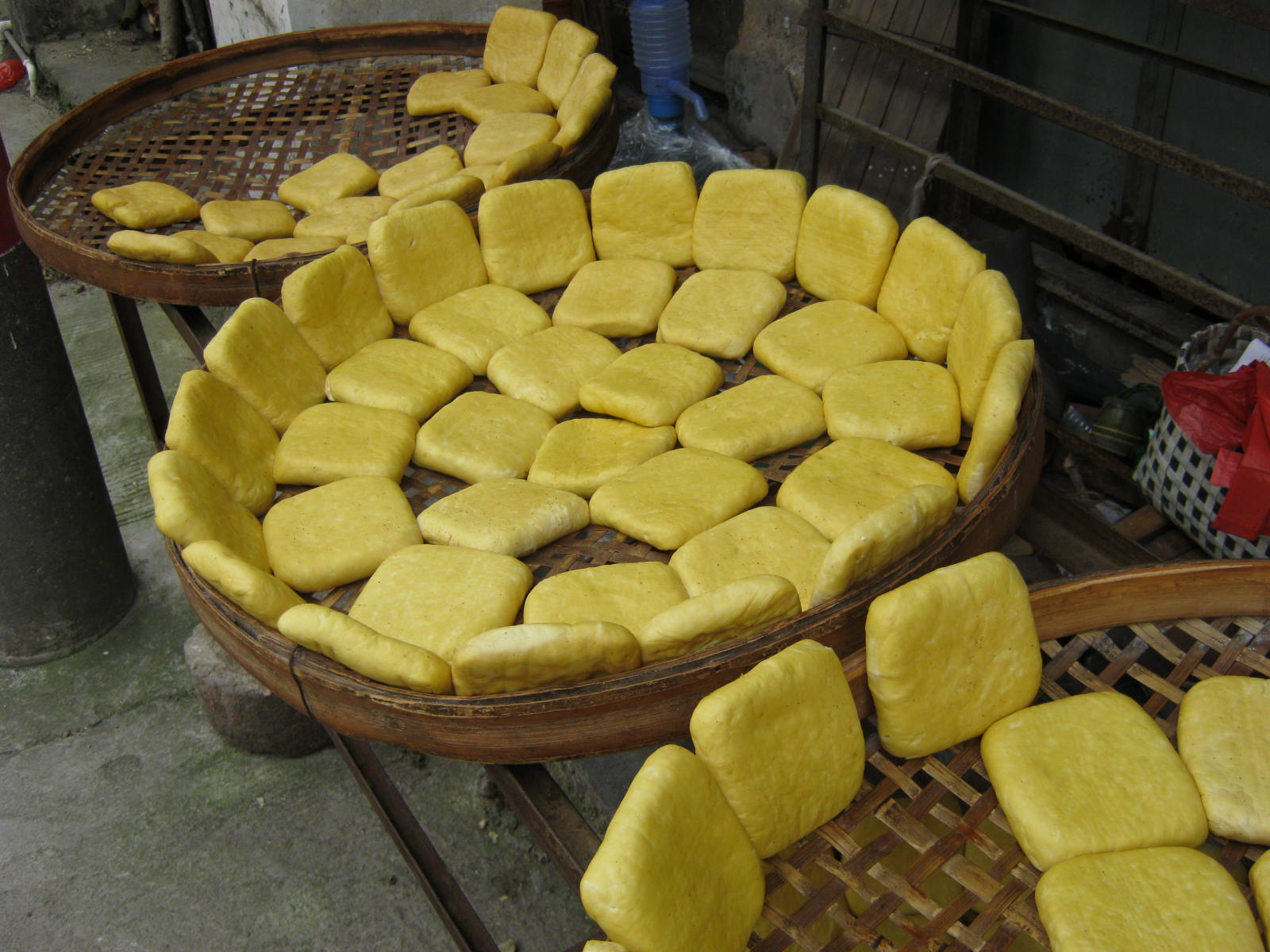
Doufu Gan, local snack

== Transportation ==
Part of Shanghang County is accessed by China National Highway 319, coming west from Xinluo District (新罗区), the municipal seat. The county seat, conventionally called Shanghang itself but officially Linjiang Town (临江镇), is reached by Route 205. The Ganzhou–Longyan Railway passes through western Shanghang.

== Tourism ==
The county's most famous cultural-historical attraction is in the town of Gutian (古田镇), namely the site of the Gutian Congress in December 1929.

== Administration ==
The county administers 17 towns (镇; zhèn), 3 townships (Chinese: 乡; pinyin: xiāng), and 2 ethnic townships (Chinese: 民族乡; pinyin: mínzú xiāng).

=== Towns ===
Shanghang County's 17 towns are as follows:

- Linjiang
- Lincheng
- Zhongdu
- Lanxi
- Rentian
- Baisha
- Gutian
- Caixi
- Nanyang
- Jiaoyang
- Jiuxian
- Huyang
- Xikou
- Taiba
- Tongxian
- Xiadu
- Chadi

=== Townships ===
Shanghang County's 3 townships are as follows:

- Panjing Township
- Buyun Township
- Shanhu Township

=== Ethnic Townships ===
Shanghang County's 2 ethnic (She ethnic) townships are as follows:

- Lufeng She Ethnic Township
- Guanzhuang She Ethnic Township

== Climate ==
Climate data for Shanghang, elevation 198 m (650 ft), (1991–2020 normals, extremes 1981–present)
Month	Jan	Feb	Mar	Apr	May	Jun	Jul	Aug	Sep	Oct	Nov	Dec	Year
Record high °C (°F)	28.8 (83.8)	32.5 (90.5)	32.7 (90.9)	34.5 (94.1)	36.1 (97.0)	37.4 (99.3)	38.9 (102.0)	39.0 (102.2)	37.9 (100.2)	36.4 (97.5)	35.0 (95.0)	29.5 (85.1)	39.0 (102.2)
Mean daily maximum °C (°F)	16.7 (62.1)	18.5 (65.3)	21.2 (70.2)	25.8 (78.4)	29.1 (84.4)	31.4 (88.5)	33.8 (92.8)	33.4 (92.1)	31.7 (89.1)	28.3 (82.9)	23.8 (74.8)	18.5 (65.3)	26.0 (78.8)
Daily mean °C (°F)	10.9 (51.6)	13.1 (55.6)	16.1 (61.0)	20.8 (69.4)	24.3 (75.7)	26.6 (79.9)	28.2 (82.8)	27.7 (81.9)	26.1 (79.0)	22.4 (72.3)	17.7 (63.9)	12.4 (54.3)	20.5 (69.0)
Mean daily minimum °C (°F)	7.2 (45.0)	9.5 (49.1)	12.8 (55.0)	17.4 (63.3)	20.9 (69.6)	23.5 (74.3)	24.5 (76.1)	24.3 (75.7)	22.6 (72.7)	18.3 (64.9)	13.5 (56.3)	8.5 (47.3)	16.9 (62.4)
Record low °C (°F)	−2.3 (27.9)	−0.1 (31.8)	−0.6 (30.9)	7.1 (44.8)	13.2 (55.8)	15.3 (59.5)	19.7 (67.5)	20.8 (69.4)	14.6 (58.3)	8.4 (47.1)	0.4 (32.7)	−5.0 (23.0)	−5.0 (23.0)
Average precipitation mm (inches)	62.4 (2.46)	86.2 (3.39)	165.9 (6.53)	179.8 (7.08)	242.7 (9.56)	291.1 (11.46)	151.9 (5.98)	237.4 (9.35)	114.4 (4.50)	41.3 (1.63)	46.8 (1.84)	45.5 (1.79)	1,665.4 (65.57)
Average precipitation days (≥ 0.1 mm)	8.6	11.3	16.8	15.9	17.2	19.2	14.0	17.0	10.7	5.7	6.0	6.8	149.2
Average snowy days	0.3	0.1	0	0	0	0	0	0	0	0	0	0.1	0.5
Average relative humidity (%)	73	75	79	78	79	81	76	79	76	70	71	70	76
Mean monthly sunshine hours	117.0	94.7	87.3	99.4	122.2	129.6	209.5	195.0	184.0	184.9	159.6	144.5	1,727.7
Percentage possible sunshine	35	30	23	26	29	32	50	49	50	52	49	44	39
Source: China Meteorological Administration

== International cooperation ==
List of Shanghang County's sister and twin cities:

- Bor, Serbia
