= Qingliu County =

Qingliu County 清流县 Tsingliu; Chingliu
- County
- Location of the seat in Fujian
- Coordinates: 26°10′41″N 116°49′01″E
- Country: People's Republic of China
- Province: Fujian
- Prefecture-level city: Sanming
- Time zone: UTC+8 (China Standard)

Qingliu (simplified Chinese: 清流县; traditional Chinese: 清流縣; pinyin: Qīngliú Xiàn, Hakka: Chhîn-liù-yen) is a county of western Fujian province, People's Republic of China. It is under the administration of Sanming City.

== Administration ==
The county executive, legislature, and judiciary are in Longjin (龙津) Town, along with the CPC and PSB branches.

=== Towns (镇, zhen) ===
- Longjin (龙津)
- Songxi (嵩溪)
- Songkou (嵩口)
- Changjiao (长校)
- Lingdi (灵地)
- Laifang (赖坊)
- Linshe (林畲)

=== Townships (乡, xiang) ===
- Tianyuan (田源)
- Wenjiao (温郊)
- Yupeng (余朋)
- Litian (里田)
- Shawu (沙芜)
- Lijia (李家)

== Climate ==
Climate data for Qingliu, elevation 363 m (1,191 ft), (1991–2020 normals, extremes 1981–2010)
Month	Jan	Feb	Mar	Apr	May	Jun	Jul	Aug	Sep	Oct	Nov	Dec	Year
Record high °C (°F)	28.0 (82.4)	31.0 (87.8)	31.9 (89.4)	34.3 (93.7)	35.5 (95.9)	37.0 (98.6)	38.8 (101.8)	39.4 (102.9)	37.3 (99.1)	35.7 (96.3)	32.3 (90.1)	28.0 (82.4)	39.4 (102.9)
Mean daily maximum °C (°F)	14.0 (57.2)	16.3 (61.3)	19.2 (66.6)	24.7 (76.5)	28.2 (82.8)	30.7 (87.3)	33.6 (92.5)	33.1 (91.6)	30.5 (86.9)	26.5 (79.7)	21.6 (70.9)	16.1 (61.0)	24.5 (76.2)
Daily mean °C (°F)	8.0 (46.4)	10.4 (50.7)	13.6 (56.5)	18.8 (65.8)	22.6 (72.7)	25.3 (77.5)	27.3 (81.1)	26.8 (80.2)	24.4 (75.9)	19.7 (67.5)	14.7 (58.5)	9.4 (48.9)	18.4 (65.1)
Mean daily minimum °C (°F)	4.4 (39.9)	6.7 (44.1)	10.1 (50.2)	14.9 (58.8)	18.9 (66.0)	21.9 (71.4)	23.0 (73.4)	23.0 (73.4)	20.6 (69.1)	15.5 (59.9)	10.6 (51.1)	5.4 (41.7)	14.6 (58.3)
Record low °C (°F)	−6.9 (19.6)	−4.2 (24.4)	−4.2 (24.4)	2.9 (37.2)	9.0 (48.2)	12.5 (54.5)	18.6 (65.5)	16.3 (61.3)	10.9 (51.6)	3.0 (37.4)	−2.8 (27.0)	−8.9 (16.0)	−8.9 (16.0)
Average precipitation mm (inches)	79.2 (3.12)	117.6 (4.63)	208.0 (8.19)	201.5 (7.93)	310.2 (12.21)	318.6 (12.54)	165.2 (6.50)	177.8 (7.00)	93.5 (3.68)	60.1 (2.37)	69.8 (2.75)	62.9 (2.48)	1,864.4 (73.4)
Average precipitation days (≥ 0.1 mm)	12.3	13.7	18.4	17.4	18.5	18.7	14.7	15.7	9.8	7.0	8.4	9.4	164
Average snowy days	0.8	0.6	0.1	0	0	0	0	0	0	0	0	0.4	1.9
Average relative humidity (%)	82	82	84	82	82	83	78	80	80	79	81	80	81
Mean monthly sunshine hours	90.7	87.3	80.9	104.2	119.1	128.3	223.4	200.9	164.3	157.3	130.3	119.3	1,606
Percentage possible sunshine	27	27	22	27	29	31	53	50	45	44	40	37	36
Source: China Meteorological Administration
