= Ninghua County =

Ninghua County 宁化县 Ninghwa
- County
- Location of the seat in Fujian Ninghua (China)
- Coordinates: 26°15′43″N 116°39′14″E
- Country: People's Republic of China
- Province: Fujian
- Prefecture-level city: Sanming

Area
  - Total: 2,381 km^{2} (919 sq mi)

Population
  - Total: 340,000
  - Density: 140/km^{2} (370/sq mi)
- Time zone: UTC+8 (China Standard)
- Postal code: 365400

Ninghua (simplified Chinese: 宁化县; traditional Chinese: 寧化縣; pinyin: Nínghuà Xiàn, Hakka: Nèn-fa-yen) is a county of the prefecture-level city of Sanming, in western Fujian province, People's Republic of China, bordering Jiangxi to the west. The town of Shibi of Ninghua is well known as the cradle of the Hakka. Ninghua is also marked as the starting place of the famous massive Long March undertaken by the Red Army of the Chinese Communist Party in 1934.

== Administration ==
The county government is located in Cuijiang town (翠江镇). There are four other towns, namely Quanshang (泉上镇), Hucun (胡村) and Shibi (石壁镇) Caofang (曹坊镇). All four lie along a single east-west highway which transects Ninghua and connects the Mingxi County with National Highway 206 in Jiangxi Province.

There are twelve sub-townships, making a total of 16 township-level divisions in Ninghua: Chengjiao (adjoining Cuijiang, the county seat), Anyuan, Shuixi, Helong, Zhongsha, Jicun, Huaitu, Fangtian, Zhiping, Caofang, Anle and Chengnan.

== Climate ==
Climate data for Ninghua, elevation 359 m (1,178 ft), (1991–2020 normals, extremes 1981–present)
| Month | Jan | Feb | Mar | Apr | May | Jun | Jul | Aug | Sep | Oct | Nov | Dec | Year |
|---|---|---|---|---|---|---|---|---|---|---|---|---|---|
| Record high °C (°F) | 27.9 (82.2) | 31.0 (87.8) | 32.9 (91.2) | 33.8 (92.8) | 35.3 (95.5) | 44.4 (111.9) | 38.4 (101.1) | 38.6 (101.5) | 36.5 (97.7) | 35.1 (95.2) | 32.2 (90.0) | 27.7 (81.9) | 44.4 (111.9) |
| Mean daily maximum °C (°F) | 13.3 (55.9) | 15.8 (60.4) | 18.7 (65.7) | 24.3 (75.7) | 27.9 (82.2) | 30.3 (86.5) | 33.2 (91.8) | 32.6 (90.7) | 30.1 (86.2) | 26.1 (79.0) | 21.2 (70.2) | 15.6 (60.1) | 24.1 (75.4) |
| Daily mean °C (°F) | 7.6 (45.7) | 10.1 (50.2) | 13.4 (56.1) | 18.7 (65.7) | 22.5 (72.5) | 25.3 (77.5) | 27.2 (81.0) | 26.6 (79.9) | 24.3 (75.7) | 19.7 (67.5) | 14.6 (58.3) | 9.1 (48.4) | 18.3 (64.9) |
| Mean daily minimum °C (°F) | 4.0 (39.2) | 6.3 (43.3) | 9.7 (49.5) | 14.7 (58.5) | 18.7 (65.7) | 21.8 (71.2) | 22.9 (73.2) | 22.7 (72.9) | 20.3 (68.5) | 15.2 (59.4) | 10.1 (50.2) | 4.9 (40.8) | 14.3 (57.7) |
| Record low °C (°F) | −7.1 (19.2) | −4.8 (23.4) | −4.6 (23.7) | 1.5 (34.7) | 8.3 (46.9) | 12.4 (54.3) | 18.6 (65.5) | 15.0 (59.0) | 10.6 (51.1) | 1.7 (35.1) | −2.8 (27.0) | −9.0 (15.8) | −9.0 (15.8) |
| Average precipitation mm (inches) | 75.2 (2.96) | 104.1 (4.10) | 210.9 (8.30) | 201.2 (7.92) | 286.2 (11.27) | 327.8 (12.91) | 154.5 (6.08) | 182.2 (7.17) | 84.4 (3.32) | 63.5 (2.50) | 70.5 (2.78) | 60.3 (2.37) | 1,820.8 (71.68) |
| Average precipitation days (≥ 0.1 mm) | 11.8 | 13.5 | 18.5 | 17.1 | 18.6 | 18.4 | 14.0 | 15.0 | 10.3 | 6.9 | 8.5 | 9.0 | 161.6 |
| Average snowy days | 1.0 | 0.7 | 0.1 | 0 | 0 | 0 | 0 | 0 | 0 | 0 | 0 | 0.6 | 2.4 |
| Average relative humidity (%) | 81 | 82 | 84 | 82 | 83 | 84 | 79 | 81 | 80 | 78 | 80 | 79 | 81 |
| Mean monthly sunshine hours | 95.2 | 90.5 | 82.7 | 107.3 | 125.0 | 129.8 | 224.5 | 202.2 | 171.7 | 166.9 | 141.0 | 129.0 | 1,665.8 |
| Percentage possible sunshine | 29 | 28 | 22 | 28 | 30 | 31 | 54 | 50 | 47 | 47 | 44 | 40 | 38 |
Source: China Meteorological Administration

== Transportation ==
The area is served by Ninghua railway station.
