= Han Chinese subgroups =

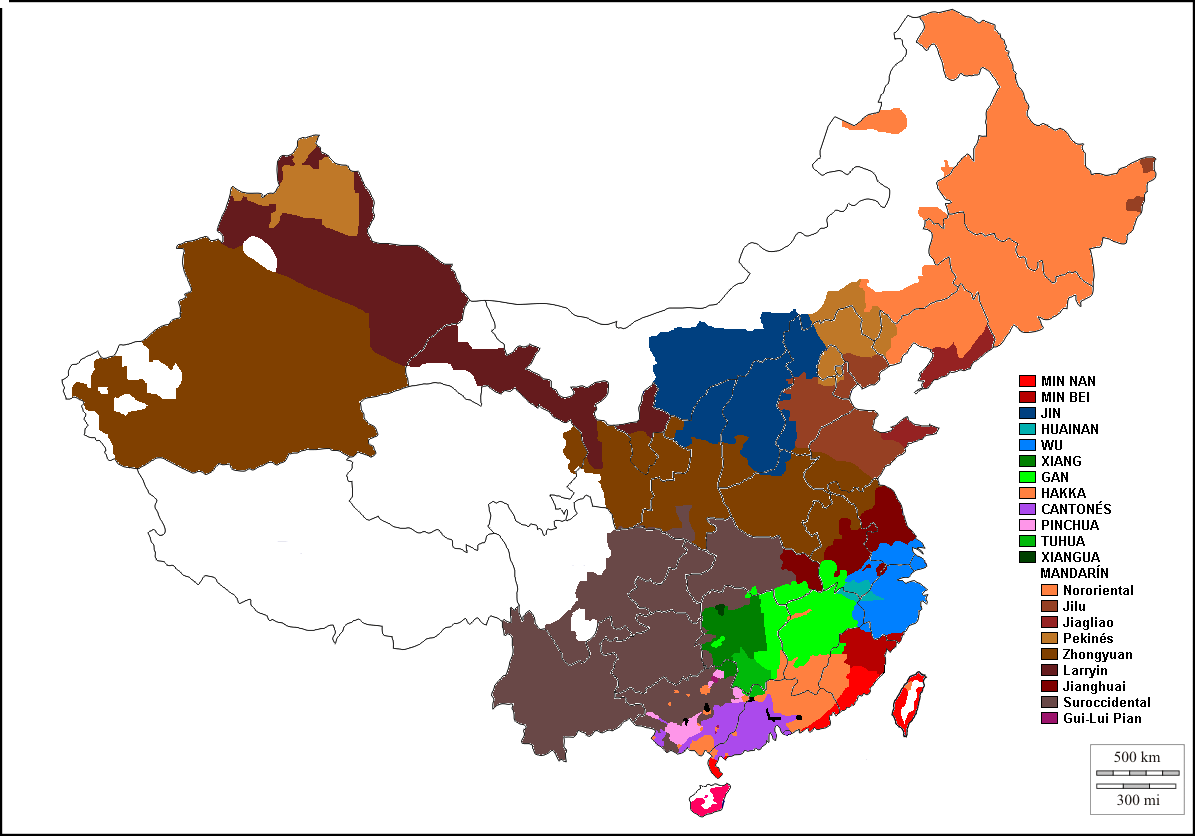
Distribution of Sinitic languages

The Han Chinese people can be defined into subgroups based on linguistic, cultural, ethnic, genetic, and regional features. The groups are termed minxi (Chinese: 民系; pinyin: mínxì; Wade–Giles: min² hsi⁴; lit. 'ethnic lineages', pronounced [mǐnɕî]) in mainland China and zuqun (Chinese: 族群; pinyin: zúqún; Wade–Giles: tzu² ch'ün; lit. 'ethnic groups', pronounced [tsǔtɕʰy̌n]) in Taiwan. While the Chinese government recognizes 56 official ethnic groups, it does not recognize Han subgroups. Taiwan recognizes three subgroups: the Hakka, Hoklo, and Waishengren.

== Han subgroups ==
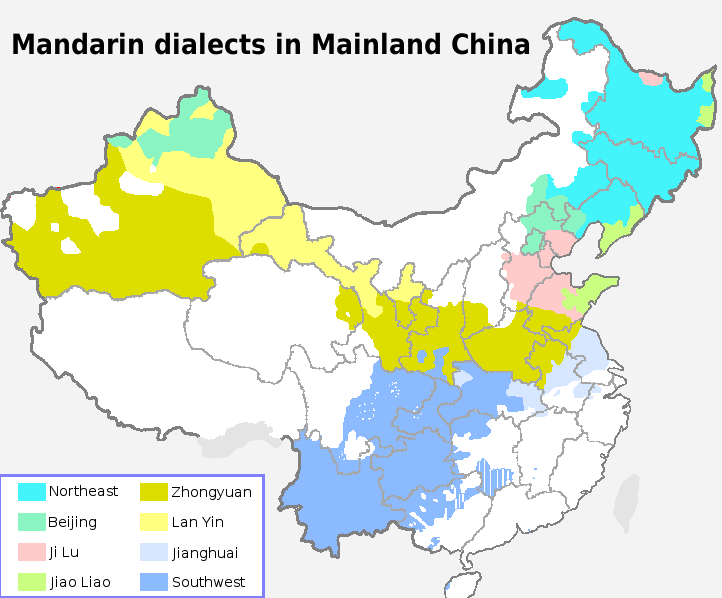
The eight main dialect areas of Mandarin in Mainland China

The main varieties of Chinese in Mainland China and Taiwan

=== Mandarin-speaking groups ===
- Native speakers: 885,000,000

Mandarin, previously called Northern Chinese, is the largest Chinese language branch. Even in regions where non-Mandarin speakers historically dominated, Standard Mandarin is being brought in as a lingua franca. The Mandarin-speaking groups are the largest group in mainland China, but in the diaspora the Min, Hakka and Cantonese dialects are more numerous. The Dungan people of Central Asia are native Central Plains Mandarin-speaking Hui peoples. Other notable Mandarin-speaking peoples include the Sichuanese people and Jianghuai people.

==== Jianghuai people ====
The Jianghuai people distribute in the Jianghuai region between the Yangtze river (Jiang, 江) and the Huai river (淮) in central Anhui and central Jiangsu. The Lower Yangtze Mandarin or the Jianghuai Mandarin is distinctive from other Mandarin dialects. The main dialects of the language is the Nanjing dialect.

==== Shandong people ====
Shandong people are subgroup of Han Chinese mainly from Shandong province, and they mainly speak three dialects, Jilu, Zhongyuan, and Jiaoliao. Solely the Shandong Province makes up 7% population of mainland China. Due to its location, Shandongese have been prominent in national migration movements, especially the Chuang Guandong migration into Manchuria, and many also became part of overseas Chinese communities. They made up 10% of Mainlanders in Taiwan, 90% of Chinese people in South Korea, and there is also a small Shandong community in Singapore and Malaysia.

==== Jiaoliao people ====
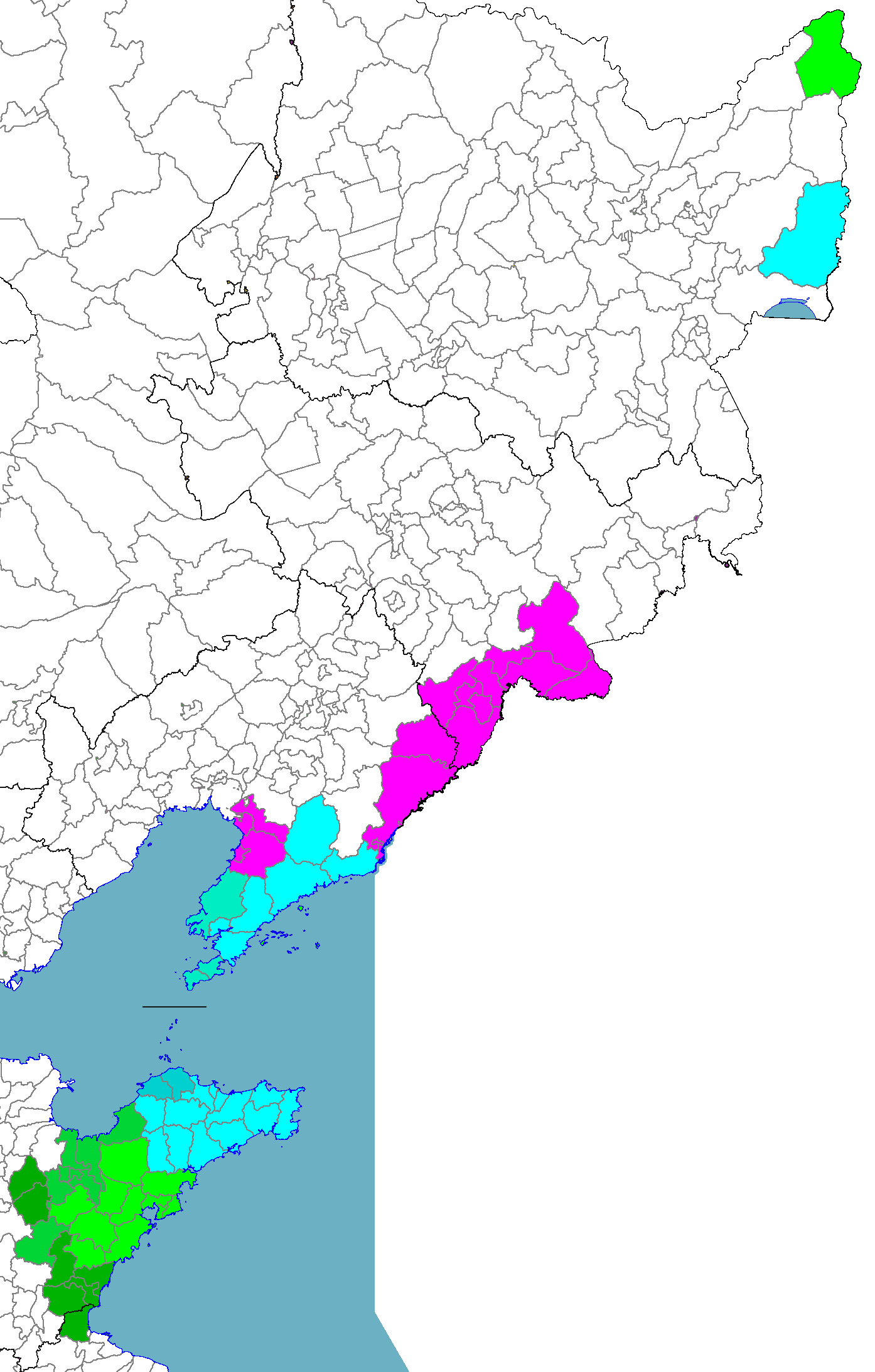
Jiaoliao Mandarin with its variants mapped

The Jiao-Liao people is a branch of Shandong people, who are distributed on both Jiaodong Peninsula and Liaodong Peninsula. Since pre-historical periods, the two peninsulas have been closely related culturally, economically and demographically. Their strong relationship is partly attributed to Miaodao Archipalegos (see Changdao County) in between the Bohai Strait, because they made the inter-strait voyage easier . The 2 peninsulas are both surrounded by the Bohai Sea to the west and the Yellow Sea to all other directions.

The Jiaoliao Mandarin differs from neighboring dialects significantly (e.g., Jilu Mandarin, Northeastern Mandarin), possibly due to the lack of population interchange and the insularity of Jiao-Liao Culture. Rongcheng dialect is the most archaic form of Jiaoliao Mandarin, in terms of vocabulary and pronunciation.

==== Sichuanese people ====
The Sichuanese people are centered around Chongqing and Sichuan. The Southwestern Mandarin are also the lingua Franca in Guangxi and Hubei.

=== Wu-speaking groups ===
- Native speakers: 77,175,000

Wu-speaking peoples, in particular, are concentrated in the Yangtze River basin (southern Jiangsu, the whole Shanghai, most of Zhejiang and parts of southern Anhui), northern Fujian, and northeastern Jiangxi. Scattered remnants of Wu-speaking Chinese are found in other parts of China, such as in Guizhou, Sichuan, Chongqing and Xinjiang, as a result after 1964. Most of them outside of Jiangnan region usually speak variants of Taihu Wu dialects. Wu Chinese is spoken chiefly in the Wu region. Jiangnanese people consist of both Shanghainese people and Ningbo people, as well as other ethnic Han in Jiangnan. They mostly speak variants of Taihu Wu Chinese. Other languages spoken are Jianghuai Mandarin and Xuanzhou Wu Chinese.

The Shanghainese people are centered around Shanghai and speak the Shanghainese dialect of Wu. Ningbo people are another Wu-speaking Chinese group and speak the Ningbo dialect. Wenzhou people are a Wu-speaking Chinese group who speak Wenzhounese. Though a significant minority are also speakers of a dialect of Min Nan known as Zhenan Min. If Huizhou Chinese was fully considered to be a subdivision of Wu Chinese, then people from Huizhou are considered to be Wu-speaking.

Wu Chinese is also spoken by a minuscule minority, particularly by mainlanders, both in Taiwan and in Hong Kong, as also other overseas Chinese communities.

=== Yue-speaking groups ===
- Native speakers: 66,000,000

Yue or Cantonese speakers are predominant in the Pearl River basin (western-central Guangdong and eastern-central Guangxi), as well as in Hong Kong and Macau. The Yue dialects spoken in Guangxi province are mutually intelligible with Cantonese. For instance, Wuzhou is about 120 miles upstream from Guangzhou, but its dialect is more like that of Guangzhou than is that of Taishan which is 60 miles southwest of Guangzhou and separated by several rivers from it. Cantonese is also spoken by some locals in Hainan. For example, the Mai dialect which is closely related to Cantonese, is spoken in Hainan Province.

There are Cantonese-speaking communities in Southeast Asia, particularly in Vietnam, Singapore, Malaysia, and to a lesser extent, in Indonesia. Many Cantonese emigrants, particularly Taishanese peoples, also migrated to United States and Canada, and later in Australia and New Zealand as well. As a result, Cantonese continues to be widely used by Chinese communities of Guangzhou and Hong Kong/Macau origin in the Western World and has not been completely supplanted by Mandarin.

=== Min-speaking groups ===
- Native speakers: 60,000,000

Min speakers are scattered throughout southern China but mostly concentrated on provinces of Fujian and Hainan, with some parts in Guangdong (especially in Chaoshan), the tip of southern Zhejiang and Taiwan.

There are several main dialects in Min Chinese. The Fuzhou dialect of Min Dong, is spoken by the Fuzhou people who are native to the city of Fuzhou. The dialect of Puxian Min is represented by the Putian people (also known as Xinghua or Henghua), the Puxian-speaking people are native to Puxian.

The Hokkien dialects of Min Nan spoken in Southern Fujian and Taiwan is the largest Min division and spoken by larger Hoklo population compared to other Min dialects. Furthermore, Hokkien is further extended into other unique Min Nan groups who speaks variants of the Min Nan dialect. The Teochew people who are native to eastern Guangdong and Hainanese people who are native of Hainan island are all Min Nan dialect groups. The dialect of Cangnan, which is Zhenan Min, is spoken in Wenzhou, Zhejiang. Outside of mainland China and Taiwan, Min Nan also make up the biggest Chinese dialect group among the overseas Chinese populations in Southeast Asia such as Singapore, Malaysia, Indonesia and Philippines.

=== Xiang-speaking groups ===
- Native speakers: 36,015,000

Xiang speakers mostly live in Hunan province, and so are often called Hunanese people. Xiang-speaking people are also found in the adjacent provinces of Hubei, Jiangxi and Sichuan. The Xiangnan Tuhua users are the minority ethnic subgroup in this region.

=== Hakka-speaking groups ===
- Native speakers: 34,000,000

The Hakka people speak Hakka and are predominant in parts of Guangdong, Guangxi, Fujian, Jiangxi and Taiwan. They are one of the largest groups found among the Ethnic Han in Southeast Asia.

=== Gan Chinese-speaking groups ===
- Native speakers: 20,580,000

The origin of Gan-speaking peoples in China are from Jiangxi province in China. Gan-speaking populations are also found in Fujian, southern Anhui and Hubei provinces, and linguistic enclaves are found in Taiwan, Shaanxi, Sichuan, Zhejiang, Hunan, Hainan, Guangdong, Fujian and non-Gan speaking Jiangxi.

=== Smaller groups ===
Other minor subgroups include speakers of the Tanka people, Gaoshan Han, Tunpu, Caijia, Peranakans, Chuanqing, Kwongsai people, Waxiang people and Taz people.

=== Remnants of Old Yue Language in Chinese Dialects ===
Dialect	Example word(s)	Meaning
Cantonese	呢 / 嗰 (ni / go2)	this / that
Cantonese	度 (dou6)	place
Cantonese	嘥 (saai1)	to waste
Cantonese	踎 (mau4)	to squat
Cantonese	呃 (aak1)	to deceive
Cantonese	曱甴 (gaat6 zaat6)	cockroach
Cantonese	蛤乸 (gaap6 naa5)	frog
Cantonese	啱 (ngaam1)	just right
Min	虼蠽	cockroach
Min	蚼蚁	ant
Min	交懔损	to shiver (with cold)
Min	著咳嗾	to choke (on smoke/dust)
Min	查埔 / 查某 (tsa-poo / tsa-bóo)	man / woman
Min	某 (bóo)	wife
Min	叨位 (to-ūi)	where
Min	古锥 (kóo-tuinn)	cute
Wu	厘儿	a small amount
Wu	薸 (bieu)	duckweed
Hakka	ni	this
Gan	扤 (wut)	to do / to make / to mess with

== Han subgroups by subculture ==
The culture of the Han Chinese is complex and diverse. The vast geographic scale of China has led the Han to culturally separate themselves into northern and southern divisions.

=== North ===
- Zhongyuan culture (中原)
- Beijing culture (北京)
- Shandong culture (魯/鲁)
- Jin culture (晉/晋)
- Dongbei culture (東北/东北)

=== South ===
- Hubei culture (楚)
- Lingnan culture (粵/粤)
- Hakka culture (客)
- Teochew culture (潮)
- Hokkien culture (閩南/闽南)
- Xinghua culture (興化)
- Fuzhou Culture (闽都/闽东)
- Jiangxi culture (贛)
- Huizhou culture (徽)
- Hunanese culture (湘)
- Sichuanese culture (蜀)
- Wuyue culture (吳/吴)
- Wenzhou culture (瓯)
- Haipai culture (海)
- Hong Kong culture (港)
- Macanese culture (澳)

== Han subgroups by region of China ==
=== Mainland China ===
The Han people originated in mainland China. Each Han subgroup is generally associated with a particular region in China; the Cantonese originated in Liangguang, the Putian in Puxian, the Foochow in Fuzhou, the Hoklo in Southern Fujian, the Chaoshan/Teochew in eastern Guangdong, the Hakka in eastern/central Guangdong and western Fujian, and the Shanghainese in Shanghai.

=== Hong Kong ===
In Hong Kong, most of the populace are Cantonese. According to the CIA World Factbook, 89% of Hong Kongers speak the Cantonese language. Other Han Chinese peoples present in Hong Kong include the Hakka, Teochew, Hoklo and Shanghainese besides ethnic minorities like the Tankas.

=== Macau ===
As per the 2021 census of Macau, 89.4% of Macau's population declared themselves to be of Chinese ethnicity. Most speak Cantonese as their "usual language" (81%). In English, the term Macanese people tends to refer to people of mixed Cantonese and Portuguese descent. Macau people is used to describe anyone who originates from or lives in Macau.

== See also ==
- Overseas Chinese
- Regional discrimination in China
- Ethnic groups of Southeast Asia
