= Hukeng =

Hukeng may refer to the following locations in China:

- Hukeng, Fujian (湖坑镇), town in Yongding County
- Hukeng, Jiangxi (浒坑镇), town in Anfu County
