= Voices of Taiwanese Women =

Collection of plays (2015)

Voices of Taiwanese Women: Three Contemporary Plays is a collection of plays edited by John Weinstein, and published by Cornell University Press in 2015. These are English translations of the plays.

All of the plays in the book, which are in the community theatre or shequ juchang (社區劇場) tradition, are written by women. The plays use non-Mandarin languages and document ethnic minorities in Taiwan. David Jortner of Baylor University stated that this differs from the Taipei-centered, male-centered theatre scene.

== Contents ==
Weinstein wrote the introduction.

The plays are:

- Echoes of Taiwan VI: We are Here (Chinese: 我們在這裡; pinyin: Wǒmen zài zhèlǐ) by Peng Ya-Ling (彭雅玲; Péng Yǎlíng) – First published in 1999
  - Wang Wan-Jung and Weinstein translated this story. The majority of the story is in Hakka language, with the introduction by the narrator is in Mandarin. The play uses Hakka culture and folk songs to illustrate a series of oral histories, told out of order in terms of time, about the ethnic group. Women make up the authors of most of the oral histories.
- One Year, Three Seasons (Chinese: 一年三季; pinyin: Yīnián Sānjì) by Wang Chi-Mei (汪其楣; Wāng Qíméi) – First published in 2000
  - The translators are Yawtsong Lee, Weinstein, and Wang Chi-Mei. The original language of this play is Taiwanese Hokkien. The play is set in Tainan and discusses entrepreneurial businesses.
- The Phoenix Trees are in Blossom (Chinese: 鳳凰花開了; pinyin: Fènghuánghuā kāile) by Hsu Rey-Fang (Chinese: 許瑞芳; pinyin: Xǔ Ruìfāng) – First published in 1994, with a modified version published in 1997.
  - Weinstein translated this story. The play stars Yoshiko Yamaguchi a.k.a. Li Xianglan. It is the longest of the three. This play uses Taiwanese Hokkien and Mandarin, and it is a series of flashbacks.

The plays were not intended to be played with Mandarin subtitles, though some productions in Taipei use them.

The book also has a language chart between English, Mandarin, Taiwanese Min-Nan, and Hakka.

The editor states in the acknowledgements section is that the intention is that the English version plays could be performed. Tarryn Li-Min Chun (陳琍敏; Chén Límǐn) of the University of Notre Dame stated that non-Taiwanese groups would face difficulty producing these plays, despite the assistance the book provides, due to cultural nuances.

== Reception ==
Chun praised the volume, stating the plays are "compelling" and that the book is "timely".
