= Culture of Jiangxi =

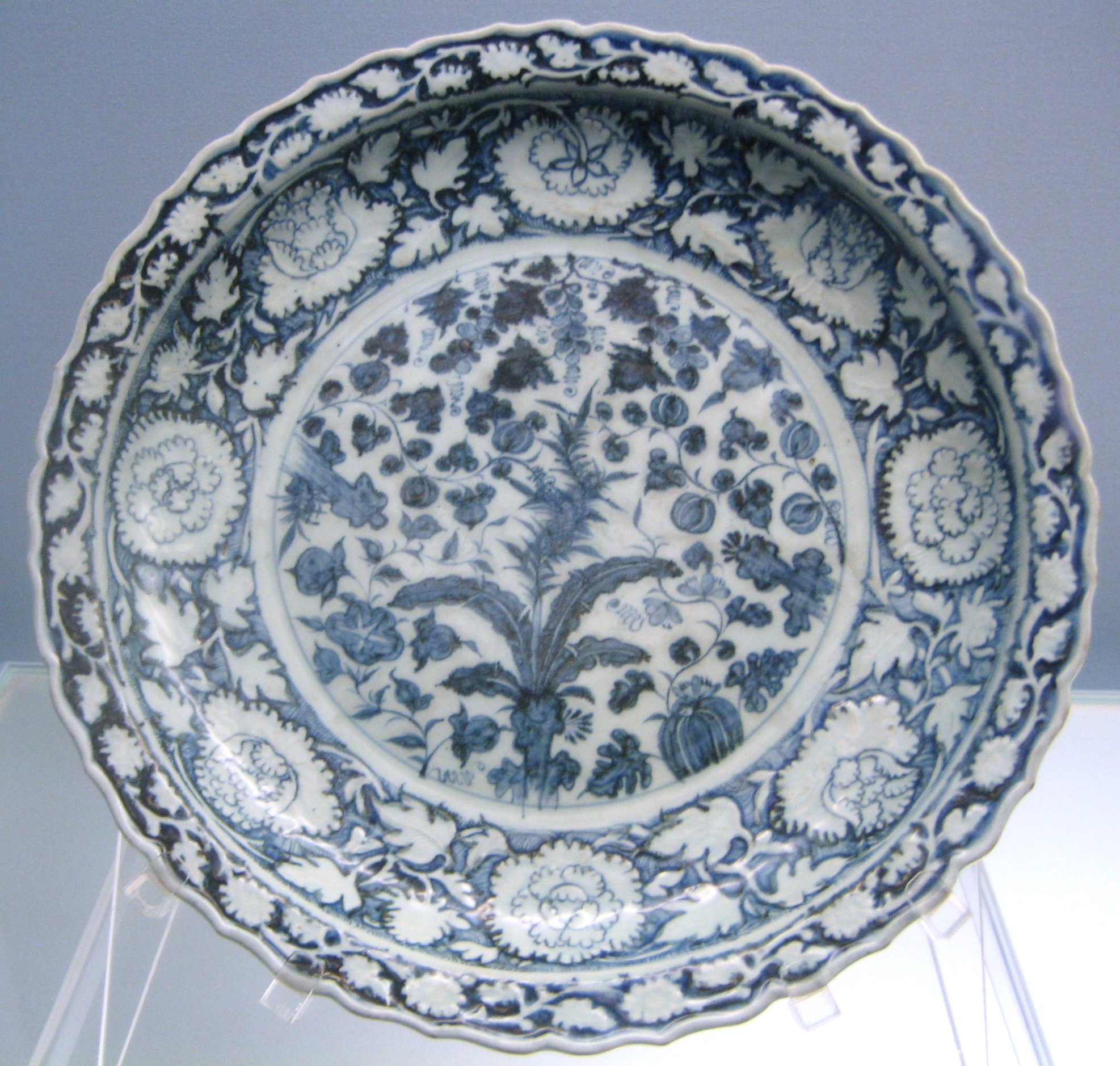
Jingdezhen-ware, Yuan dynasty, 1271—1368

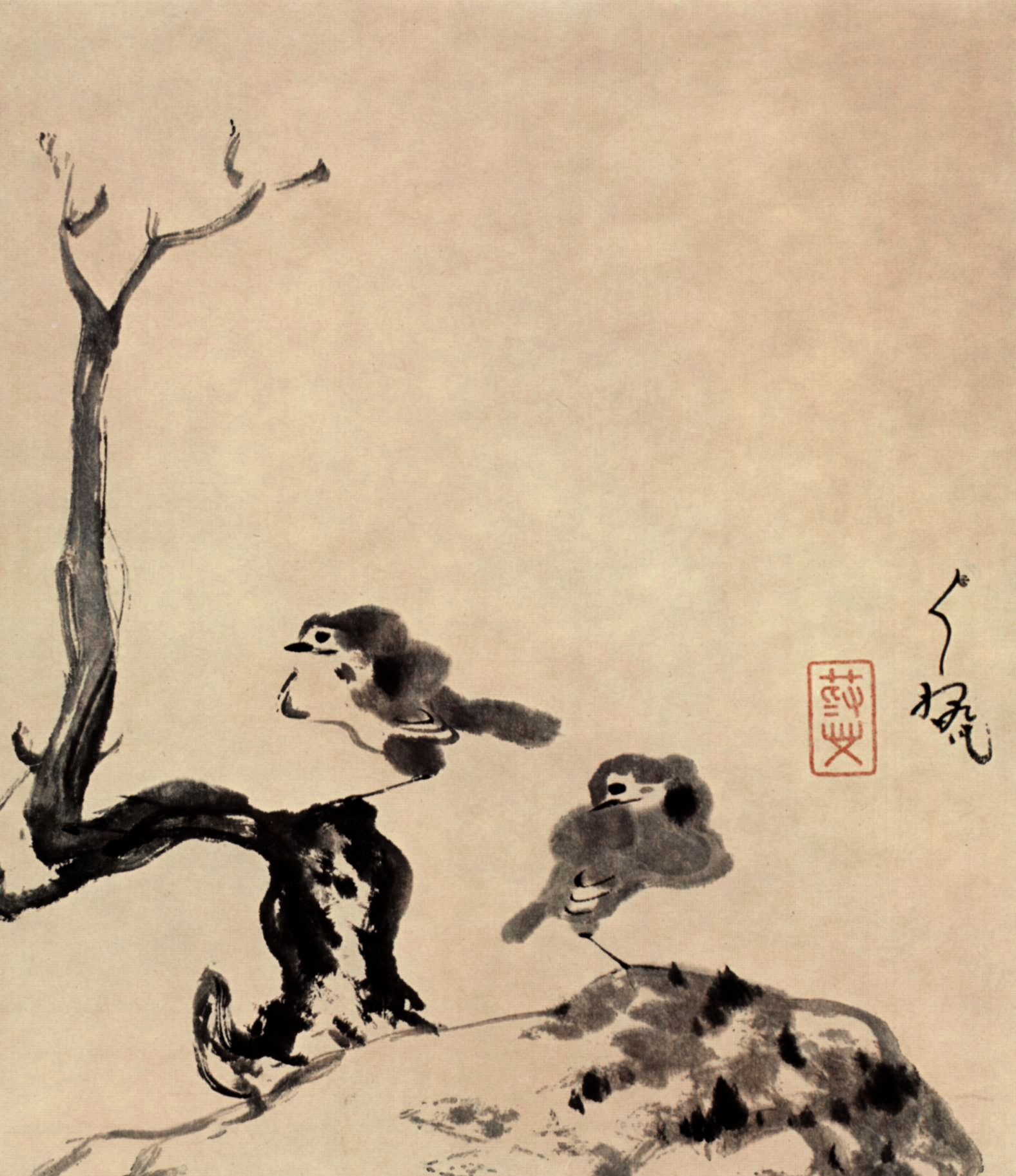
Bada Shanren, 1626—1705

The culture of Jiangxi refers to the culture of the people based in or with origins in Jiangxi province, China. It has changed greatly over several millennia, from the land's prehistoric period to its contemporary culture, which incorporates ancient and traditional Chinese culture and modern culture influenced by Western culture.

Geographic situation makes Jiangxi distinguish from its neighbors, as high mountains separate it from Zhejiang to the east, Fujian and Guangdong to the south, Hunan to the west and Yangzi River forms a natural division between the South and northern China.

== Language ==
Gan Chinese has always played a significant role in Jiangxi culture. The Chinese variety is spoken mainly in Jiangxi but also in surrounding regions such as Hunan, Hubei, Anhui, and Fujian. Modern Gan is considered as one of Sinitic languages, which derives from Old Gan and still keeps some linguistic traces of ancient languages in South China.

Gan Chinese is written in traditional Chinese characters with Gan variants. Many vocabulary items are no longer used in most Chinese varieties, particularly in Mandarin, while they remain in daily usage in Gan. For example, cooking utensils are called uoh (Chinese: 鑊) or tiang (Chinese: 鼎) in Gan which date back to the Shang dynasty. The Bible was also translated into some Gan dialects as the Christianity was introduced into Jiangxi as early as the 16th century, with the arrival of Marco Polo.

== Academy culture ==
Since the academy represents the historical and cultural progress in a place, the importance of it gradually increased during the thousands of years in China. In ancient China, Jiangxi had four academies and they brought special learning atmosphere to Jiangxi for more than 2000 years.

== Tea culture ==
Tea is one of the most popular drinks in the world; as a national drink in China, it represents not only the property of drinker but also the inspiration and tradition within the tea. Lushan Yunwu tea, which is named for Mount Lu in Jiangxi Province, shows the optimistic and peaceful character of people in Jiangxi.

== Literature ==
=== Novel ===
Most of the long novels of Jiangxi don't show how reality is, they pay attention to the "excavation of history and culture".

Different from the novels, the majority of short stories of Jiangxi closely related to the practice world. Urbanization beings several topics for writers to discuss how it changes and reforms the structure of society. In addition, the transformation process where traditional concepts are influenced by industrialization is shown in the short stories.

== Performing arts ==
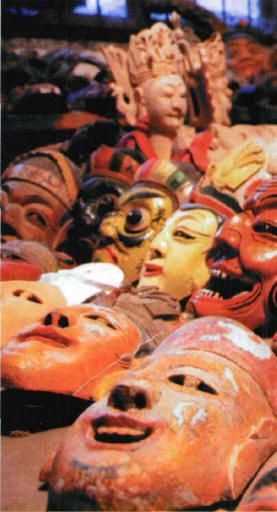
Masks used when performing Nuo opera

=== Nuo opera ===
Nuo opera, which is said to have some relations with Baiyue culture, is a popular folk opera in Jiangxi and it develops into various styles in different cities. They all have martial scenes involving combat and non-martial scenes narrating ordinary stories, which differs Jiangxi Nuo from other Nuo operas in southwest China.

Since the late Qing dynasty, there have been about 150 Nuo opera performing groups. A temple for the nuo god, which was built in the Ming dynasty, is still in good function today for people to worship the nuo god. About 80 nuo opera programs date from the past still exist today. The number of nuo opera masks in Jiangxi is over 2000, and there are approximately 2000 professional nuo opera performing folk artists.

== Architecture ==
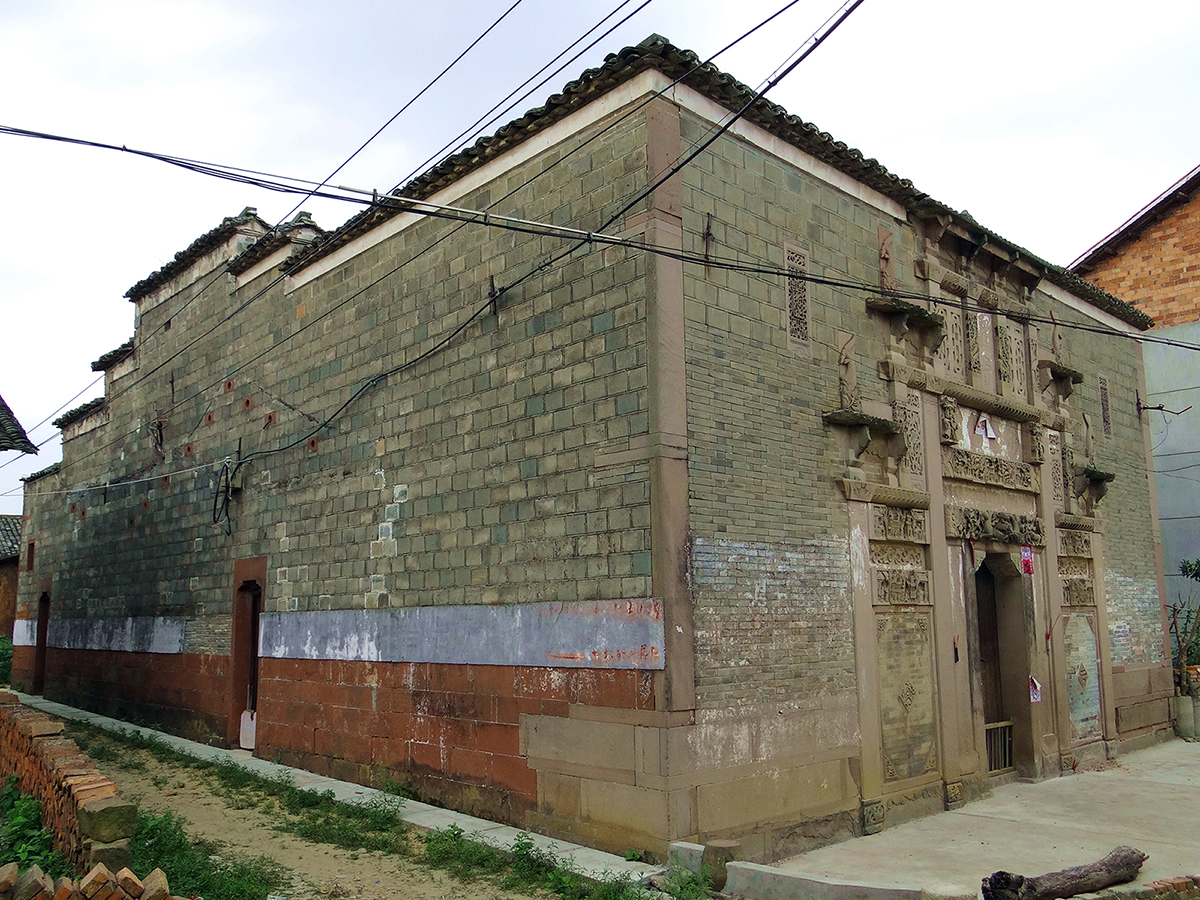
Building in Jiangxi

Jiangxi architecture is heavily influenced by Fengshui theories of Taoism, one of whose birthplaces is located in Mount Longhu. It pays much attention to the harmony between inhabitants and the building and can simply make details to fix the direction of the bed in order to be coordinated to the background of the inhabitant. The Buddhism is also prosperous in Jiangxi, and traditional religional architecture are found in each city.

== Cuisine ==
Jiangxi cuisine favors overtly spicy flavors, an important feature of many southern cuisines. Chili peppers are directly treated as vegetable instead of as a flavoring and sometimes they are also used in some traditionally non-spicy dishes. Stir frying is one of key techniques in Jiangxi cooking and fish are common ingredients due to numerous rivers within Jiangxi.

== Religions ==
=== Pure Land Buddhism ===
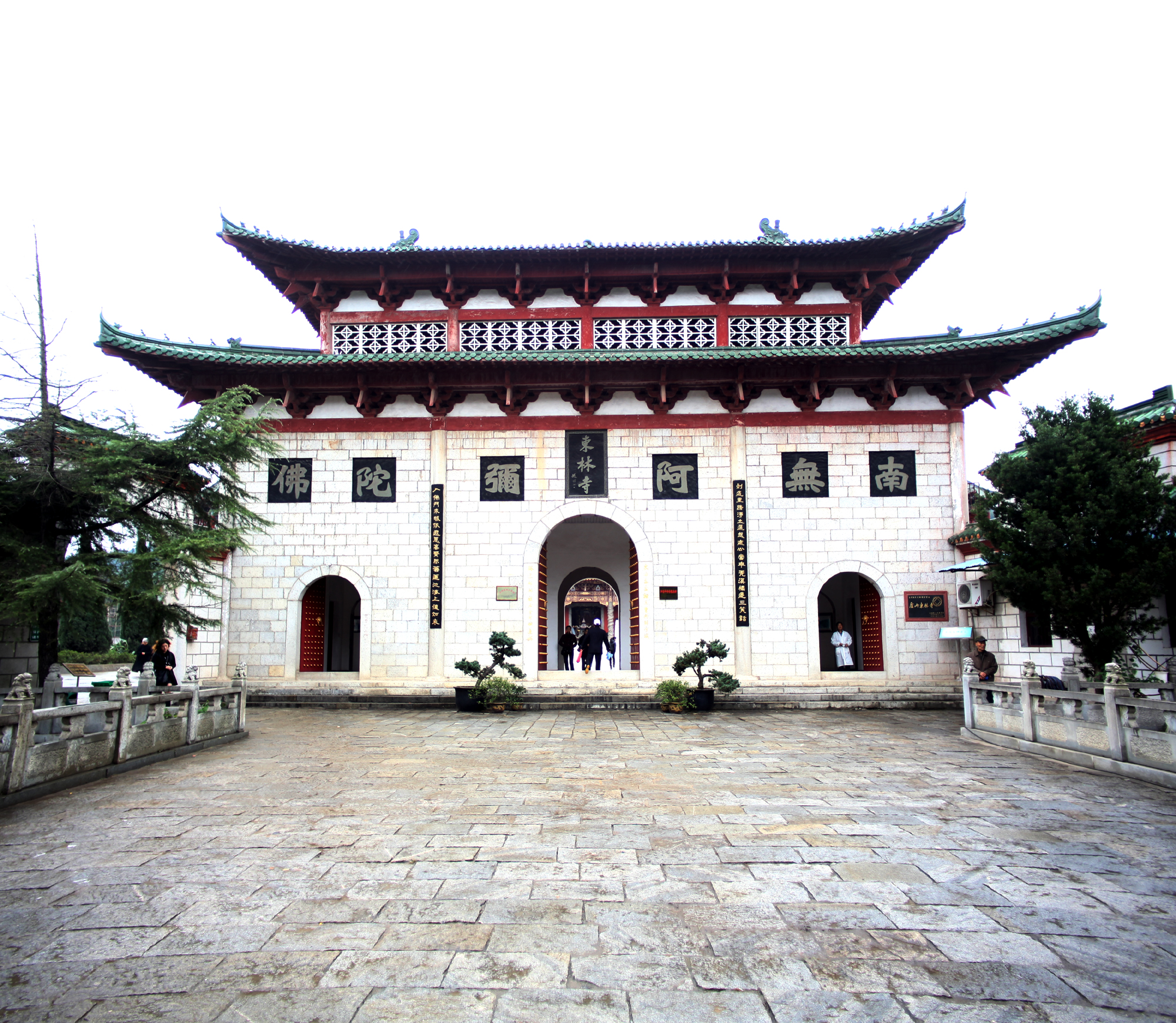
Donglin Temple in Lushan, Jiangxi, is considered an important site for Pure Land Buddhism.

Pure Land Buddhism originated in Jiangxi.

== People in the culture ==
Jiangxi people or Jiangxinese (贛人, Gonnin) believe in the bottom-line Chinese values of "family solidarity", "courtesy" and "saving face" that carry significant weight in the culture. Equally, mountainous geography and abundant population have the people learn to be contented being basically well-off (小富則安), sort of Neo-Confucianism developed by Zhu Xi and Lu Jiuyuan.

== Scenery ==
By 2013, Jiangxi had 4 world heritage sites, 5 national heritage sites and 3 world geoparks. For example, the Lushan mountain, Sanqing mountain. These mountains also the object of many ancient Chinese poems.

=== Lushan mountain ===
Lushan has beautiful scenery and profound cultural connotations. It is a combination of mountains, cultural mountains, religious mountains and political mountains. It is about 25 kilometers long and about 10 kilometers wide. The main peak is Hanyang Peak, which is 1474 meters above sea level. The mountain is oval, with a typical barrier-shaped block mountain.

== See also ==
- Cantonese culture
- Hokkien culture
- Hakka culture
- Culture of Hunan
- Wuyue culture
- Chinese culture
