= Li Family Fist =

Li Family Fist, a martial art from Guangdong, is one of the schools of Chinese martial arts. It belongs to the Nanquan style and is a branch of Shaolin martial arts. It is a martial art of Hakka culture and is an intangible cultural heritage of Meizhou.

== Lineage ==
The founder of Li Family Fist is Li Tieniu from Shui Zhai, Wuhua. During the Qianlong period of the Qing Dynasty, Li Tieniu followed his father to Fujian Putian’s Southern Shaolin to diligently practice martial arts. After returning to his hometown, he dedicated himself to refining his techniques and established his own school, known as Li Family Fist. Currently, Li Family Fist is divided into two branches: the Meizhou branch, which follows the traditional forms passed down by Li Tieniu, and the Chaoshan branch, which has introduced its own innovations.

== Introduction ==
The characteristics of Li Family Fist are "cunning and fierce" and "steady, precise, and deadly." The forms are structured with strict discipline, movements are compact and powerful, with strong and full energy, and the style is highly offensive. It does not focus on flashy postures but instead emphasizes practicality.

Li Family Fist focuses on close-quarters combat, often using direct attacks and defenses, without being confined to specific techniques. It prioritizes a compact body, strong waist, and fast, powerful hand techniques, with an emphasis on the principle of "striking after the opponent," blending defense into attack. The forms reflect the principles of "clumsy, slow, and simple," meaning there is hidden skill within apparent clumsiness, starting slow and ending fast, simplifying complexity into straightforward movements.

== Forms ==
The forms of Li Family Fist are divided into five sets: Tuntou Fist, Ejian Fist, Chibu Fist, Jieshou Fist, and Chajian Fist. In terms of weapons, the main focus is on the Eighteen Tiger Stake Hammer, with other weapons including the precise sword, precise knife, and palm weapons, all having distinct male and female forms, as well as chain whip forms. The system combines both hardness and softness, transitioning from hard to soft and back to softness. Due to its comprehensive system and clear structure, it is well-organized and systematic.
