= Hakka culture =

Ethnic culture

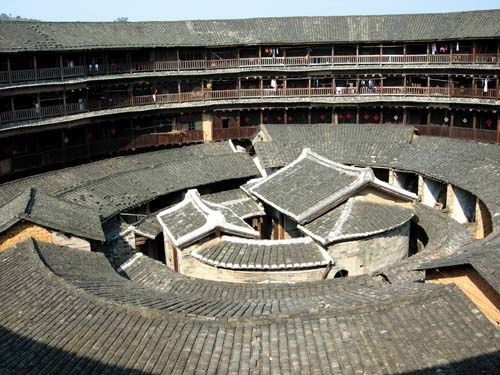
Hakka people are widely remembered for building walled villages to defend themselves during the Punti–Hakka Clan Wars.

Hakka culture (Chinese: 客家文化) refers to the culture created by Hakka people, a Han Chinese subgroup, across Asia and the Americas. It encompasses the shared language, various art forms, food culture, folklore, and traditional customs. Hakka culture stemmed from the culture of Ancient Han Chinese, who migrated from China's central plain to what is modern day's Southern China during the 6th to 13th century, and intermixed with local non-Han Hmong–Mien speaking ethnic groups such as the Yao people, the She people, and the Miao people. It has also been influenced by the cultures of surrounding Han Chinese groups, such as the Cantonese and the Hoklo. Having historically lived in the mountains of Southern China and being minority groups in many of the surrounding Chinese provinces, the Hakka have developed a culture characterized by reservedness, stability, and frugality.

== Arts ==
=== Hakkapop ===
Hakkapop is a genre of Hakka pop music made primarily in Taiwan, China, Indonesia and Malaysia.

== Cuisine ==
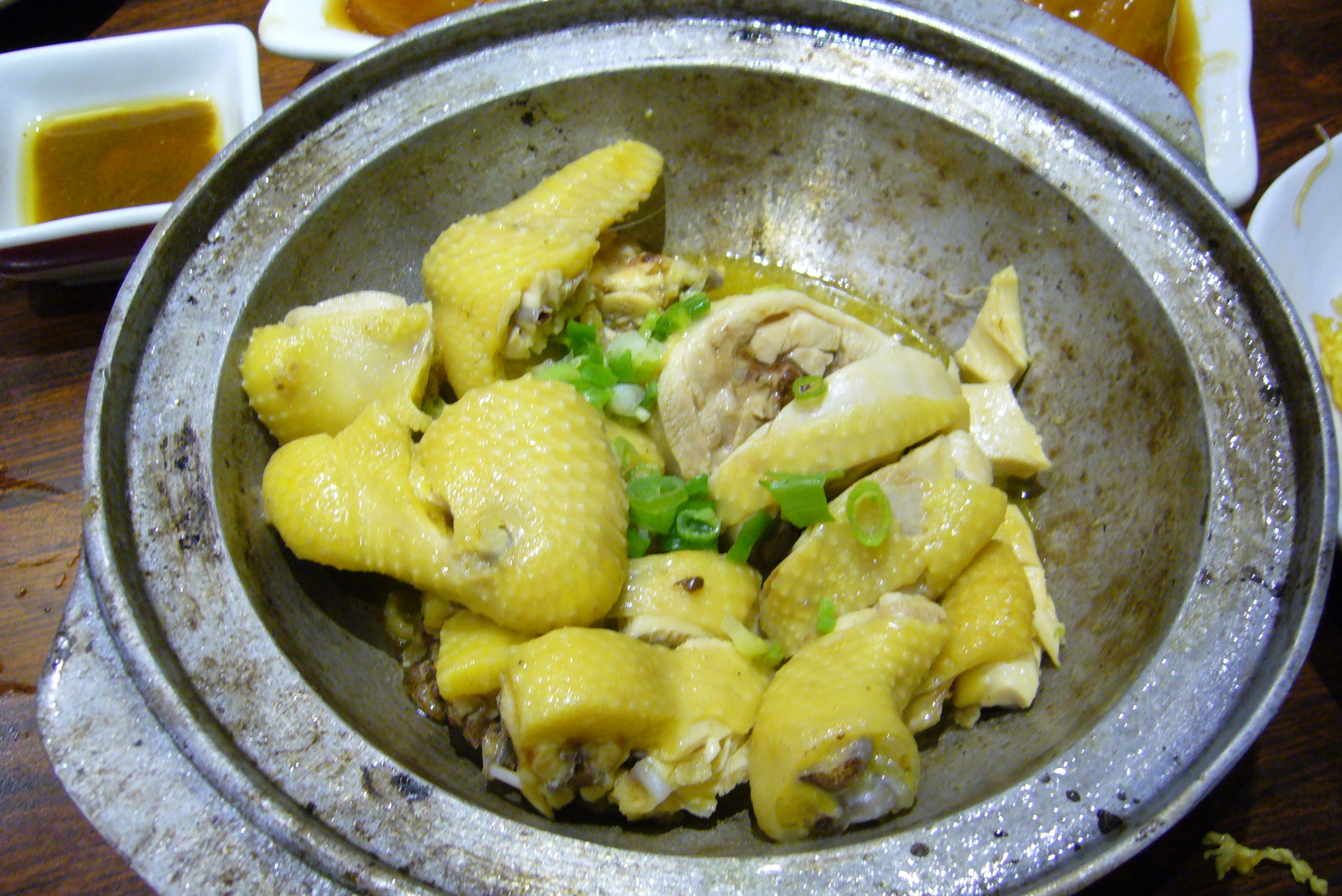
Hakka salted chicken.

Traditionally engaging in large amount of physical labor, Hakka people favor salty food and marinated vegetables that enable them to maintain their stamina.

== Martial arts ==
The Hakka community is a source for a variety of martial arts including Southern Praying Mantis, Bak Mei and Southern Dragon kung fu.

== Clothing ==
- Shanku - coat and trousers worn by both Hakka men and women; the preferred colour is usually black and blue. Hakka people in Taiwai usually wear coats, trousers, and skirts.
- Liangmao - a traditional Hakka hat worn by Hakka people.
- Footbinding - Historically, Hakka women did not bind their feet when the practice was commonplace in China.

== Religion ==
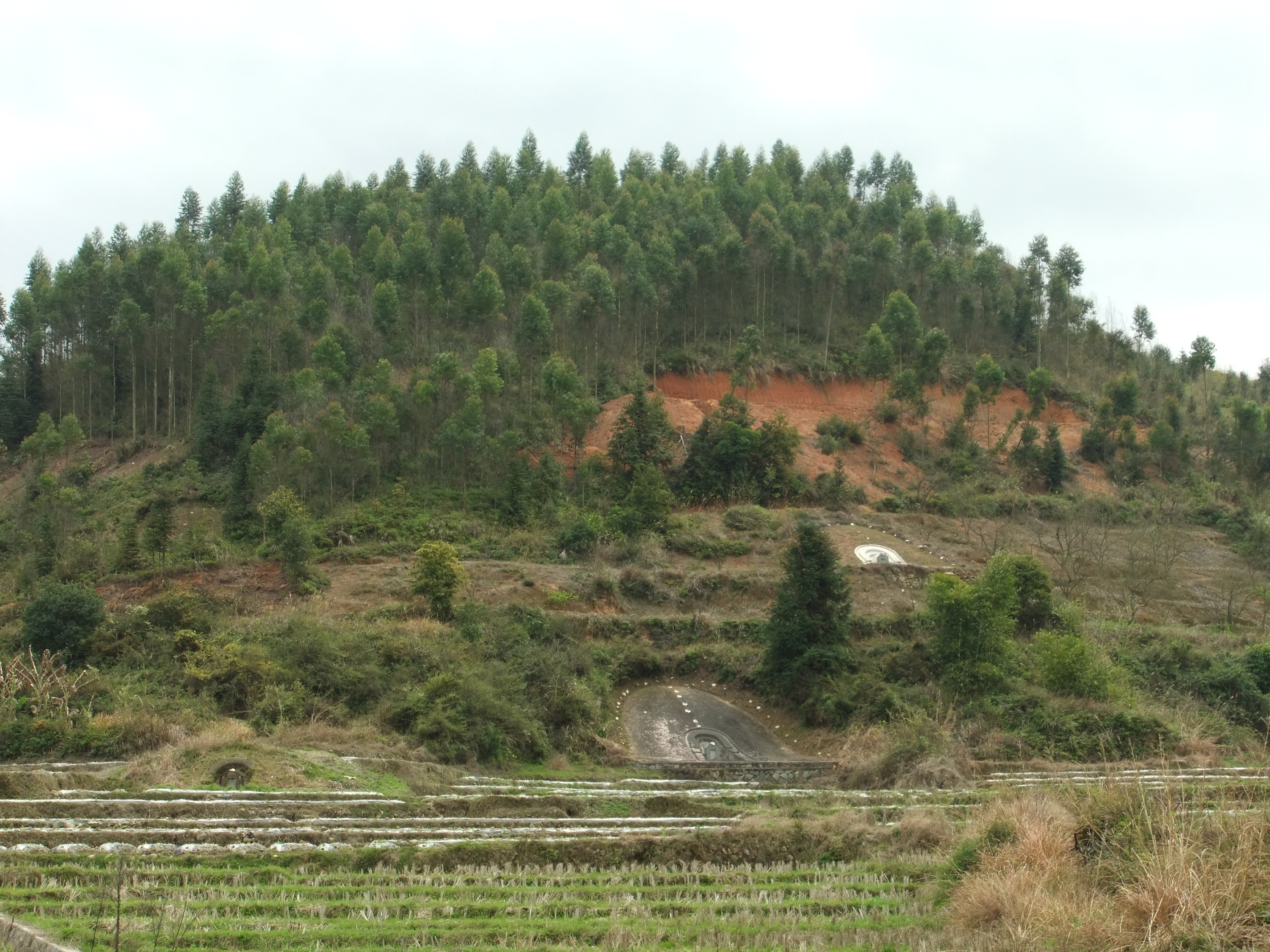
Typical traditional hillside tombs. Hukeng Town, Yongding County, Fujian.

The religious practices of Hakka people are largely similar to those of other Han Chinese. Ancestor veneration is the primary form of religious expression. One distinctively Hakka religious practice involves the worship of dragon deities.

== Hakka spirit ==
Hakka spirit refers to the Hakka people's spirit of endurance, diligence, and bravery in exploring new lands.

== Hakka sport culture in Taiwan ==
In Taiwan, the first Hakka community came from China Meizhou of Guangdong province, Chaozhou, Huizhou. They remain their living habits and plain life style. The most characterized area is Liudui which is located in Kaohsiung and Pingtung. Hundreds of years ago, Liudui stood for six militia units of Hakka defense, which are Qiandui, Houdui, Zuodui, Youdui, Zhongdui and Hsianfengdui, respectively. Therefore, it represents to the Hakka communities in Pingtung and Kaohsiung. During the Qing Dynasty, the people in Liudui pushed down by the government. In order to strengthen their solidarity and protect their home, the people trained for defense. Gradually, the Liudui Hakka martial art become a local sport as the Japanese Government ruled Taiwan. With a great effort and support of local people, in 1948, the first Liudui Sports Game was held in Zhutian, Pingtung. However, it was forced to barricade for eighteen years by the government when Taiwan was under the martial law generation. Fortunately, in 1966, the Liudui Sports Game back in action. This event is annually held by the local government, and it has a strong connection with the Hakka culture. Since then, it has been a firm tradition event in Taiwan. The Liudui Sports Game is also known as Olympics of Dawu Mountain. This sport game originated from the early martial. It is held by the Liudui immigrants. Liudui Sports Game is the biggest and the most unique Hakka contest in the Southern Taiwan, and it is the only Hakka sports event in the country. The purpose of the Liudui Sports Game is not only to commemorate the brave early immigrants but also to let the Hakka tradition pass down for years. Moreover, this game encourages people to do more exercise because exercising is good for people in both physical and mental part. It is also a perfect time to gather people together. The Liudui Sports Game is popular among the athletes in Taiwan. Many famous athletes and sports figures have participated in this game such as Tseng Tsai-hua, who competed at the 1976 Summer Olympics in Montreal. Furthermore, it is often viewed as one of the cradles for Taiwan’s athletes. Recently, the Liudui Sports Game has become a Hakka festival. Since it is not only an athletic activity but also a festival that people can learn about the Hakka culture such as history, art, and customs. People said that the Liudui Sports Game has carried on tradition Hakka culture, and truly demonstrated the Hakka spirit. Before the sports competitions begin, there are series of activities which are included in this festival. For instance, it will hold passing the Liudui torch, an opera performance, and a bicycling tour. In addition, after the competition, there are a group of singers and bands hold a concert in the evening.

== See also ==
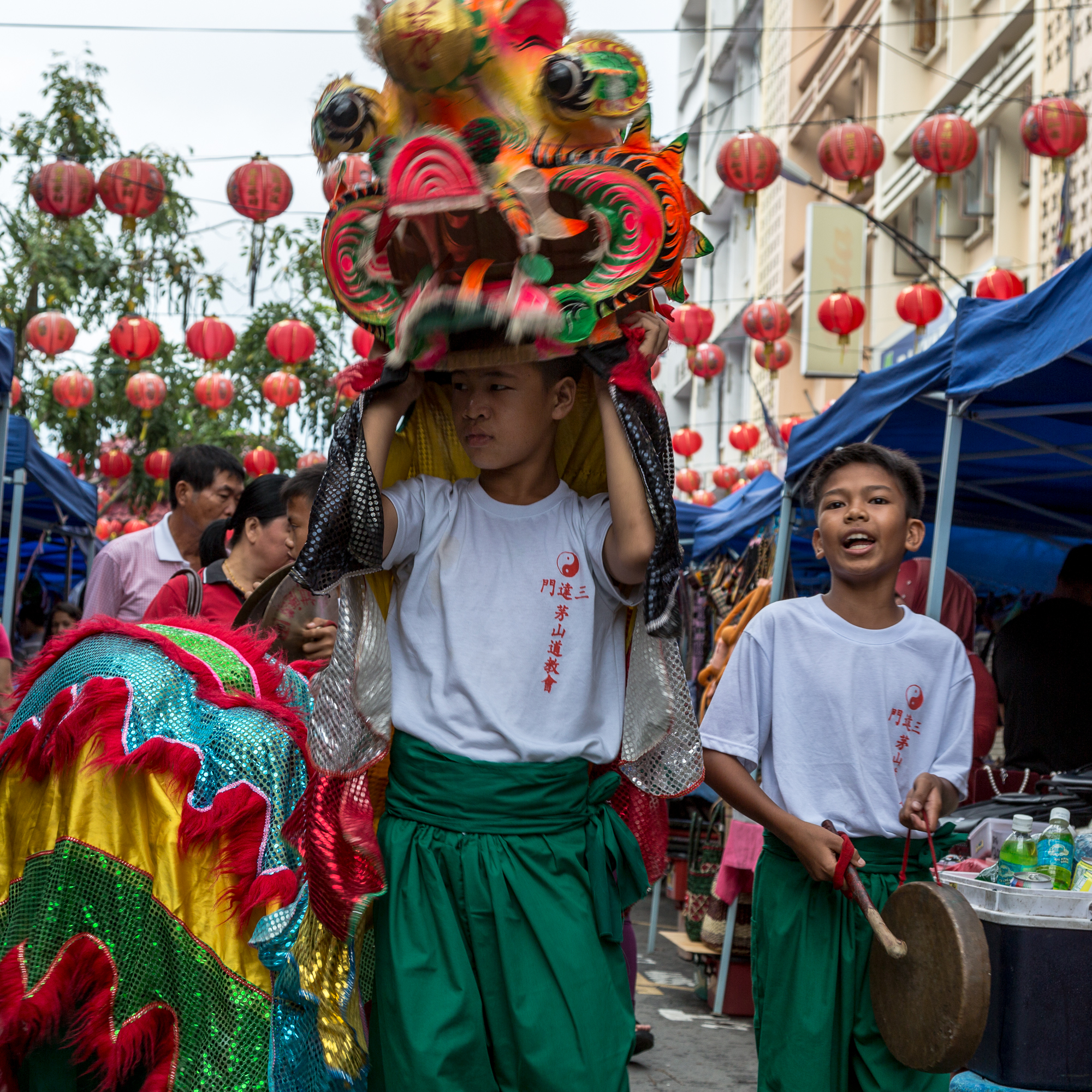
Hakka traditional Qilin dance

- Cantonese culture
- Hokkien culture
- Gan culture
- Xiang culture
- Chinese culture
