= Gaotou Township =

Gaotou Township 高头乡
- township
- Location in Fujian Gaotou Township (China)
- Coordinates: 24°40′00″N 117°01′00″E
- Country: People's Republic of China
- Province: Fujian
- Prefecture-level city: Longyan
- District: Yongding District

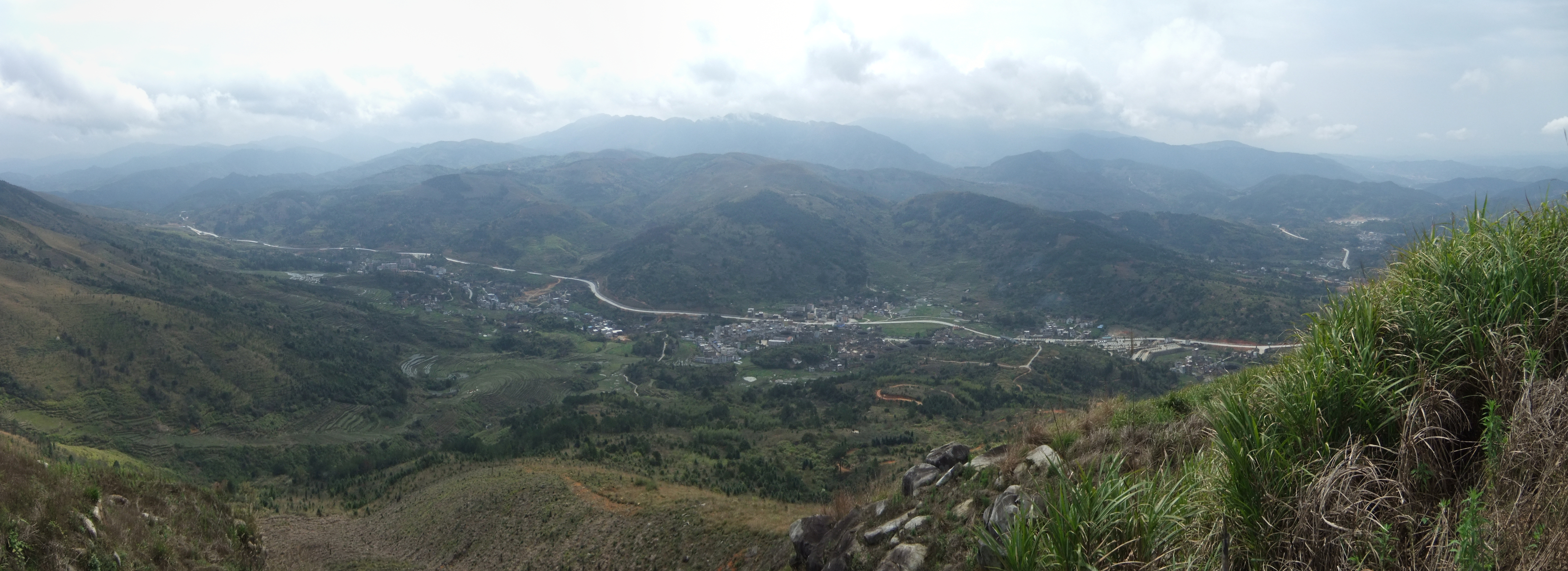
Panoramic view of Gaotou Township, from Jin Mt northwest of town

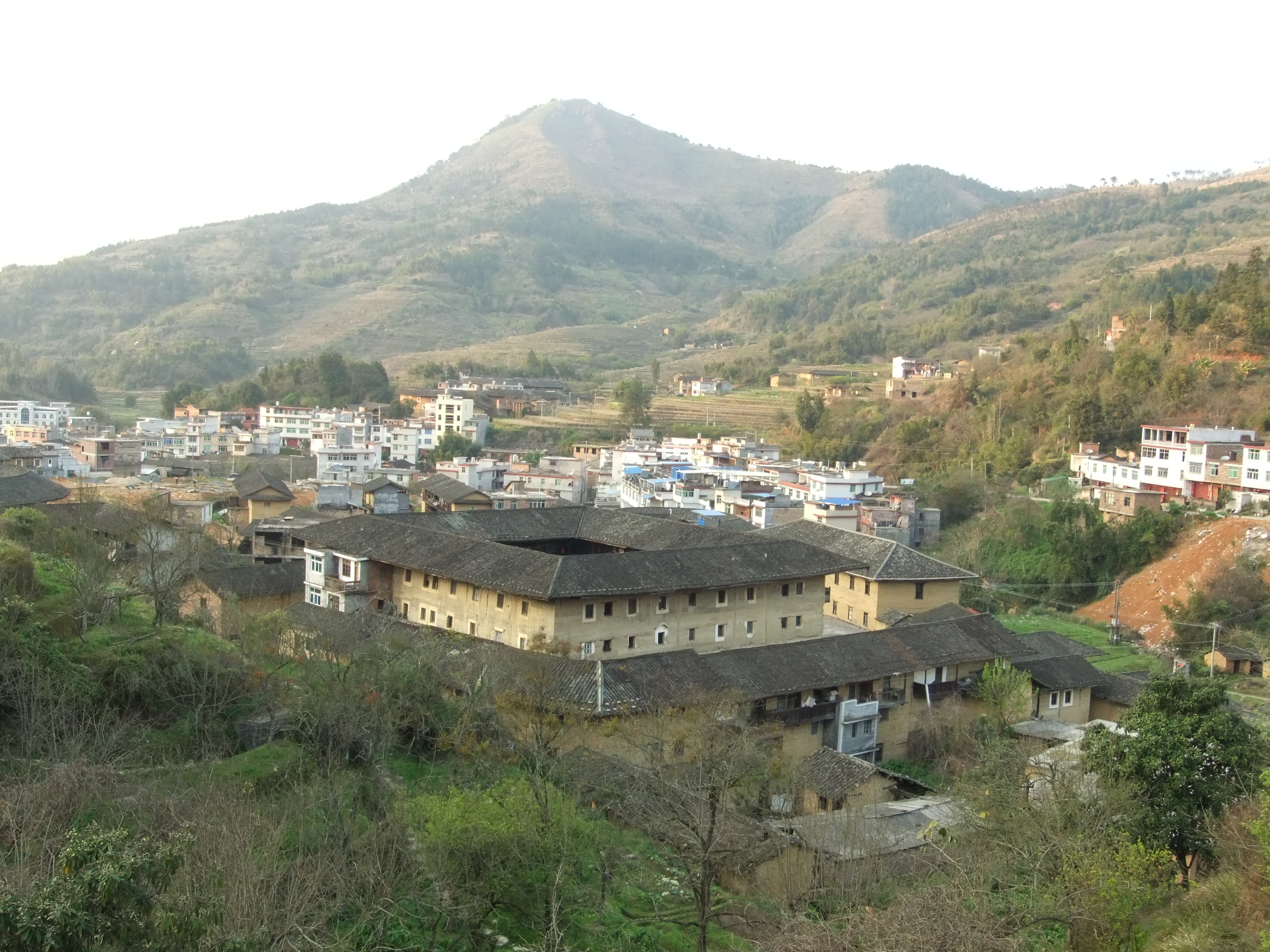
Gaodong Village, the center of Gaotou Township, seen from highway southeast of town

Gaotou Township (Chinese: 高头乡; pinyin: Gāotóu xiāng) is one of the townships of Yongding County in China's Fujian Province.

Gaotou Township is located in the eastern part of Yongding County, bordering on Nanjing County in the east. It is in the basin of the Gaotou Creek (高头溪, Gāotóu xī), whose waters flow (eventually) into the Ting River.

Gaotou Township is located in the heart of Fujian's tulou country. One of the units of the UNESCO World Heritage object "Fujian Tulou" is the Gaobei Tulou Cluster (高北土楼群), located in the township's Gaobei Village (on the western outskirts of the township's main residential area). It is centered on the large and well-preserved Chengqi Lou, promoted as "the King of Tulou". The Gaobei Tulou Cluster area is well developed for tourism, with a large visitor reception center and a parking area nearby.

The township's main residential area, where most government offices and businesses are located is formed by three adjacent villages - Gaobei, Gaodong, and Gaonan, situated in the valley of the Gaotou Creek. As many towns in the "tulou country", these villages today are a mix of the traditional tulou (and smaller traditional buildings, constructed using the same material and techniques) and the typical nondescript "modern" architecture found in small towns around China.

== See also ==
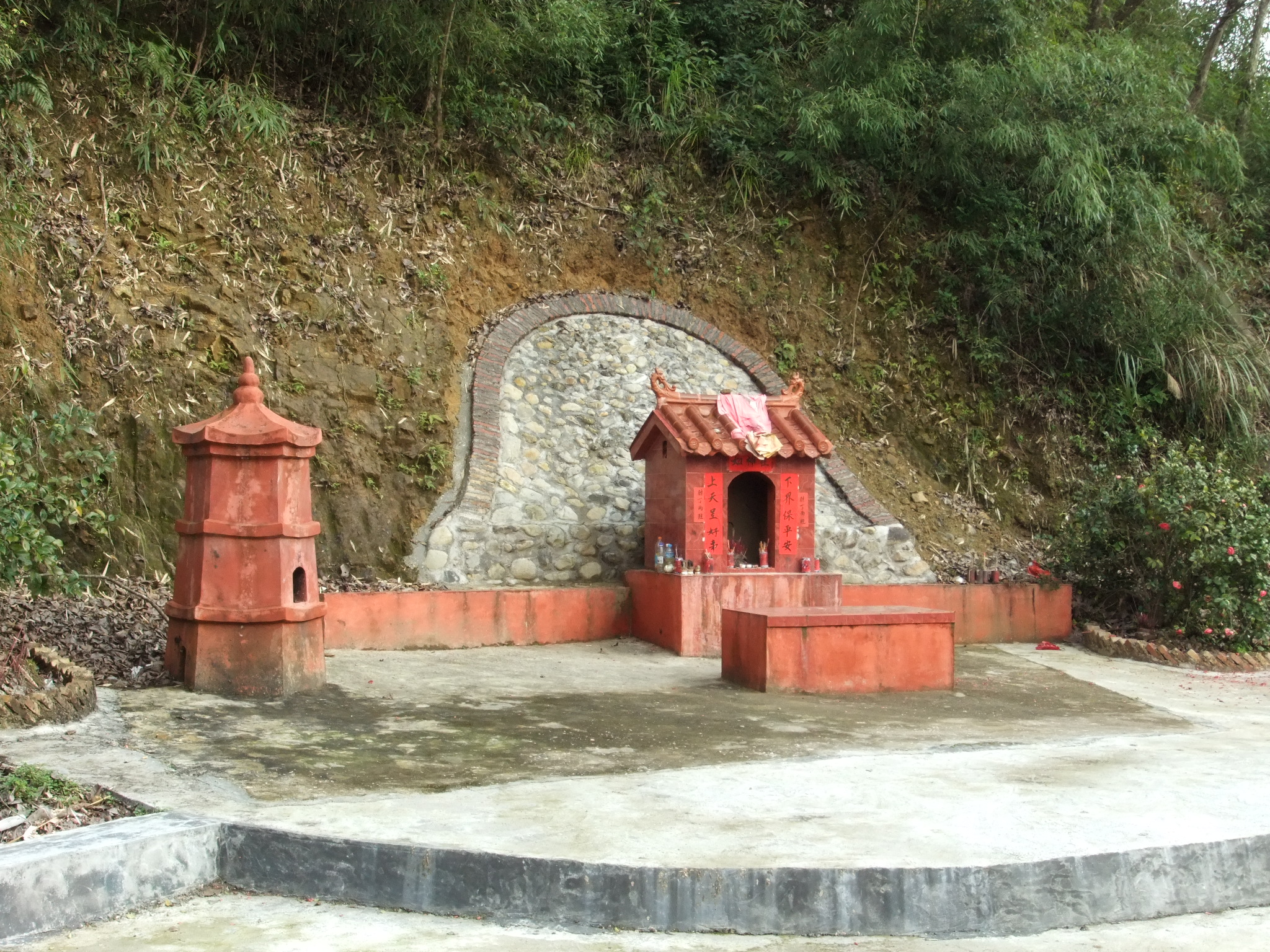
A roadside shrine

- List of township-level divisions of Fujian
