= Gaoshan Han =

Gaoshan Chinese
高山漢族

Regions with significant populations
- Yunnan and Guizhou

Related ethnic groups
- other Han Chinese

The Gaoshan (高山漢) are a subgroup of the Han Chinese located in Yunnan and Guizhou provinces such as in Rongjiang County of Guizhou. They number roughly 400,000. The culture of the Gaoshan Han is strikingly different from mainstream Han culture, as they mix culture with the Miao and Dong population.
