= Yongding, Longyan =

Yongding 永定区 Engteng; Yungting
- District
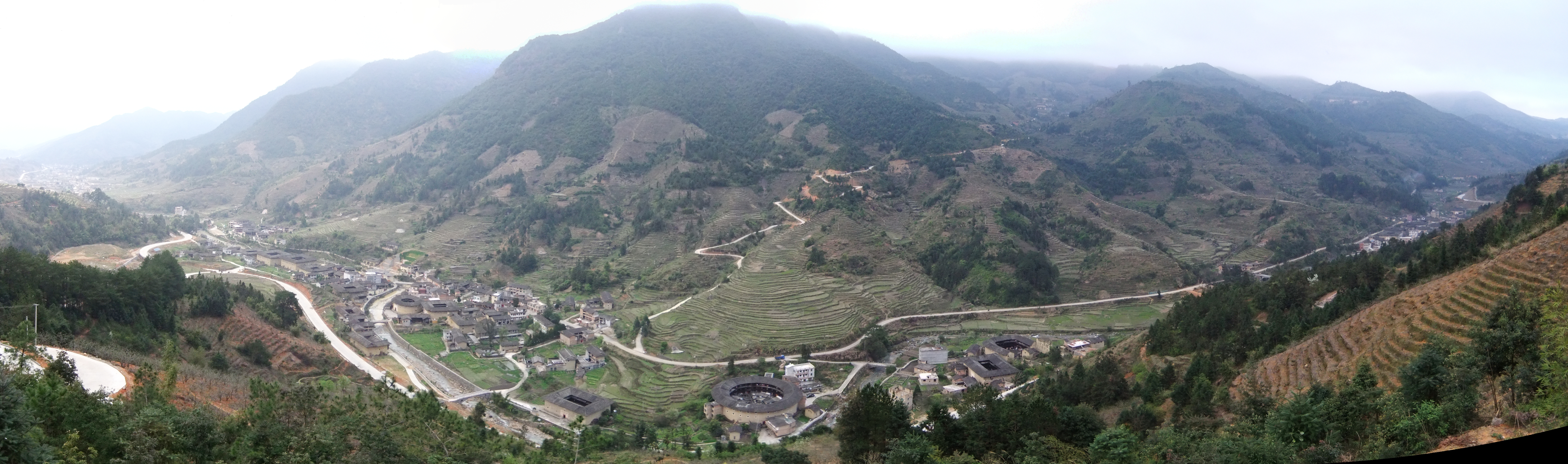
- Tulou landscape in the Nanxi Creek Valley, Hukeng Town (Nanjiang Village)

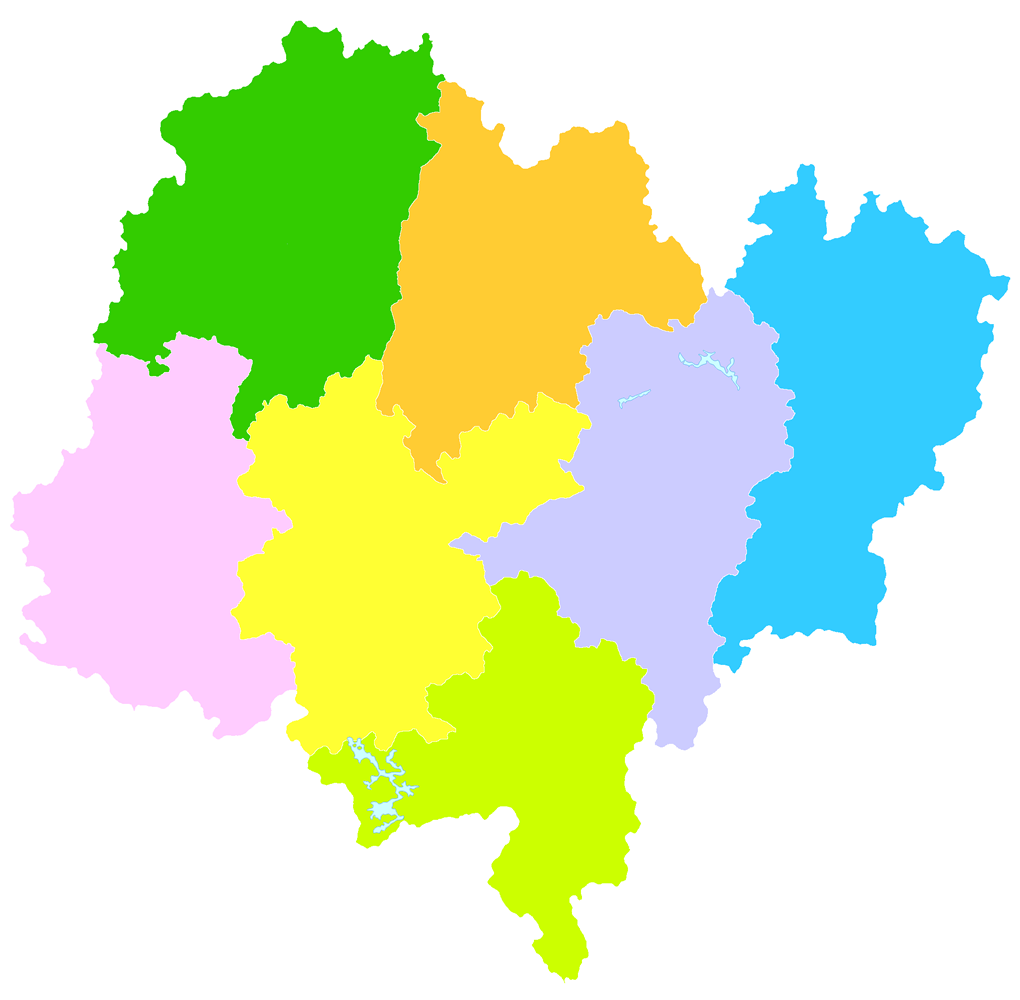
- Yongding in Longyan

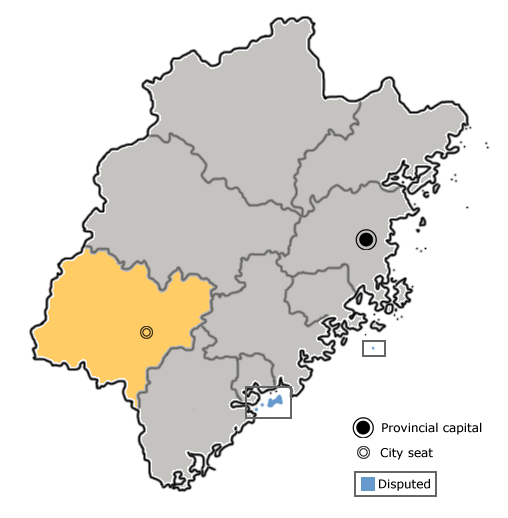
- Longyan in Fujian
- Coordinates (Yongding government): 24°43′26″N 116°43′55″E
- Country: People's Republic of China
- Province: Fujian
- Prefecture-level city: Longyan

Area
  - Total: 2,223 km^{2} (858 sq mi)

Population (2015)
  - Total: 361,000
  - Density: 162/km^{2} (421/sq mi)
- Time zone: UTC+8 (China Standard)
- Website: www.fjyd.gov.cn/index.html

Yongding, Longyan
- Simplified Chinese: 永定
- Traditional Chinese: 永定
- Hakka: Yún-thin
- Postal: Engteng
Transcriptions
Standard Mandarin
- Hanyu Pinyin: Yǒngdìng
Hakka
- Romanization: Yún-thin

Yongding (Chinese: 永定) is a district under the jurisdiction of Longyan prefecture-level city in the southwest of Fujian Province, People's Republic of China. The district is a center for Hakka culture, including the traditional Hakka tulou, and a local dialect of the Hakka Chinese called the Yongding Dialect. As of 2015, Yongding has a permanent population of about 361,000, of which more than 99% are Hakka, the rest being She people. In December 2014, the Fujian government signed legislation converting Yongding from a county to a district.

Yongding is the hometown of many overseas Chinese immigrants that came to south-east Asia and Burma during the British Raj.

== History ==
Yongding County was established in the 14th year of Chenghua (AD 1478) in the Ming dynasty. It was originally part of Shanghang County. The governor of Fujian province proposed to separate this south-eastern part of the Shanghang County to form a new county and name it Yongding, literally meaning peaceful forever, after suppressing a riot in that particular region.

On December 13, 2014, the Fujian government passed a law converting Yongding from a county to a district. The law came into effect on February 9, 2015.

In March 2015, Hugang was upgraded from a township to a town, and Fengcheng Subdistrict was upgraded from a town to a subdistrict.

== Geography ==
Located in the southwest of Fujian province, Yongding District is situated on the Fujian-Guangdong border. Yongding District is bordered by Nanjing County in Zhangzhou to the east, Pinghe County in Zhangzhou to the southeast, Dabu County and Meixian District of Meizhou, Guangdong to the southwest, Shanghang County to the northwest, and Xinluo District to the northeast. Both Dabu and Shanghang are Hakka-speaking counties; Longyan city centre (aka Xinluo District), Nanjing and Pinghe are predominantly Minnan-speaking.

Yongding District is 2,223 km^{2} (858 sq mi) in area. Like other counties of Fujian province, Yongding is 80% hills and mountains, 10% water or rivers, and 10% fields. Two major rivers run through the district: Yongding River (永定河) and Xiayang Creek (下洋溪). Both are tributaries of the Ting River (Chinese: 汀江, the name by which it is known in Fujian territory) or Han River (Chinese: 韩江, the name by which it is known in Guangdong province).

=== Climate ===
Located in a sub-tropical area and subject to typhoons, Yongding has high annual precipitation of about 1,200 to 1,500 millimetres (47 to 59 in) per year.

Climate data for Yongding, elevation 227 m (745 ft), (1991–2020 normals, extremes 1981–2010)
Month	Jan	Feb	Mar	Apr	May	Jun	Jul	Aug	Sep	Oct	Nov	Dec	Year
Record high °C (°F)	28.8 (83.8)	32.3 (90.1)	32.4 (90.3)	34.3 (93.7)	35.7 (96.3)	36.6 (97.9)	38.4 (101.1)	38.3 (100.9)	37.4 (99.3)	35.5 (95.9)	33.7 (92.7)	30.0 (86.0)	38.4 (101.1)
Mean daily maximum °C (°F)	18.0 (64.4)	19.5 (67.1)	21.9 (71.4)	26.1 (79.0)	29.2 (84.6)	31.4 (88.5)	33.5 (92.3)	33.1 (91.6)	31.7 (89.1)	28.6 (83.5)	24.6 (76.3)	19.7 (67.5)	26.4 (79.6)
Daily mean °C (°F)	11.5 (52.7)	13.5 (56.3)	16.4 (61.5)	20.7 (69.3)	24.0 (75.2)	26.3 (79.3)	27.6 (81.7)	27.1 (80.8)	25.6 (78.1)	22.0 (71.6)	17.7 (63.9)	12.7 (54.9)	20.4 (68.8)
Mean daily minimum °C (°F)	7.4 (45.3)	9.6 (49.3)	12.7 (54.9)	16.9 (62.4)	20.3 (68.5)	22.9 (73.2)	23.5 (74.3)	23.4 (74.1)	21.7 (71.1)	17.6 (63.7)	13.1 (55.6)	8.3 (46.9)	16.5 (61.6)
Record low °C (°F)	−4.1 (24.6)	−1.6 (29.1)	−1.1 (30.0)	6.4 (43.5)	11.7 (53.1)	15.0 (59.0)	19.6 (67.3)	18.6 (65.5)	14.2 (57.6)	5.5 (41.9)	0.0 (32.0)	−5.1 (22.8)	−5.1 (22.8)
Average precipitation mm (inches)	62.9 (2.48)	91.3 (3.59)	151.7 (5.97)	182.0 (7.17)	238.6 (9.39)	289.0 (11.38)	177.7 (7.00)	215.8 (8.50)	124.6 (4.91)	38.1 (1.50)	44.1 (1.74)	44.8 (1.76)	1,660.6 (65.39)
Average precipitation days (≥ 0.1 mm)	8.3	11.5	15.9	15.7	17.2	18.4	15.6	17.1	11.6	5.7	5.8	6.6	149.4
Average snowy days	0.2	0.1	0	0	0	0	0	0	0	0	0	0	0.3
Average relative humidity (%)	78	79	81	80	81	82	79	81	79	76	77	77	79
Mean monthly sunshine hours	125.0	99.8	92.4	107.2	124.8	136.4	206.0	193.1	182.8	184.2	160.3	146.2	1,758.2
Percentage possible sunshine	37	31	25	28	30	34	50	48	50	52	49	45	40
Source: China Meteorological Administration

== Administrative divisions ==
Yongding District current administers 1 subdistrict, 14 towns, and 9 townships.

divided into twenty-four township-level divisions: one subdistrict, twelve towns and eleven townships.

=== Subdistrict ===
The district executive, legislature and judiciary are in Fengcheng Subdistrict (凤城街道), formerly the town of Fengcheng (凤城镇), together with the CPC and PSB branches. Fengcheng Subdistrict is the district's sole subdistrict, and had a population of 48,048 as of 2015.

=== Towns ===
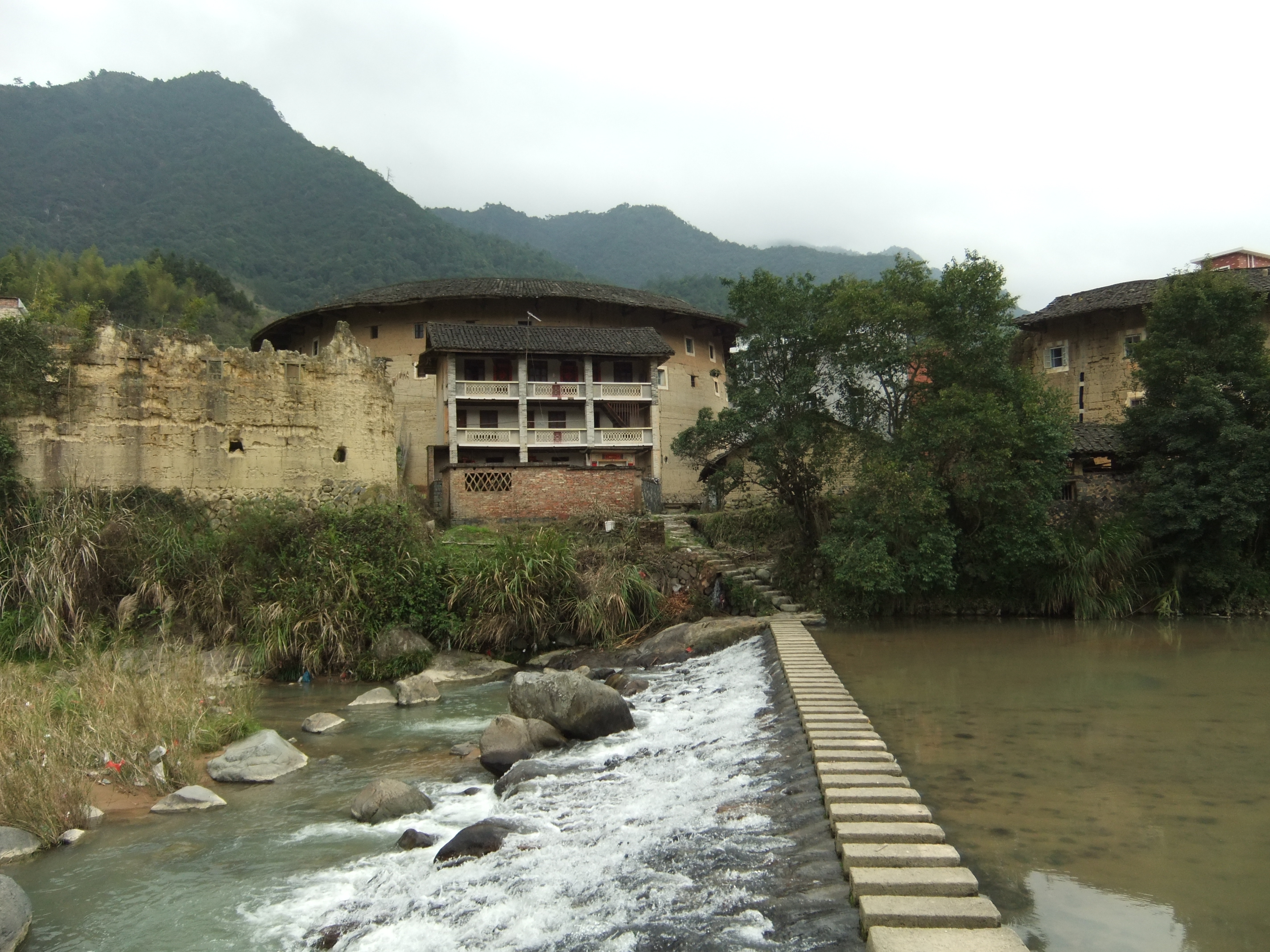
Xinnan Village (Chinese: 新南村), Hukeng

The district is home to the following 14 towns:

English name	Hanzi	Population (2015)
Kanshi	坎市镇	26,164
Xiayang	下洋镇	38,466
Fushi	抚市镇	31,213
Gaobei	高陂镇	47,786
Hulei	湖雷镇	43,064
Hukeng	湖坑镇	24,860
Peifeng	培丰镇	38,965
Fengshi	峰市镇	8,419
Longtan	龙潭镇	13,302
Chengjiao	城郊镇	13,428
Xianshi	仙师镇	20,967
Hugang	虎岗镇	17,250
Tangbao	堂堡镇	15,982
Qiling	岐岭镇	14,657

=== Townships ===
The district is home to the following 9 townships:

English name	Hanzi	Population (2015)
Xixi Township	西溪乡	4,703
Jinsha Township	金砂乡	7,007
Hongshan Township	洪山乡	8,328
Hushan Township	湖山乡	12,076
Guzhu Township	古竹乡	15,583
Hexi Township	合溪乡	17,256
Daxi Township	大溪乡	13,465
Chendong Township	陈东乡	13,422
Gaotou Township	高头乡	10,109

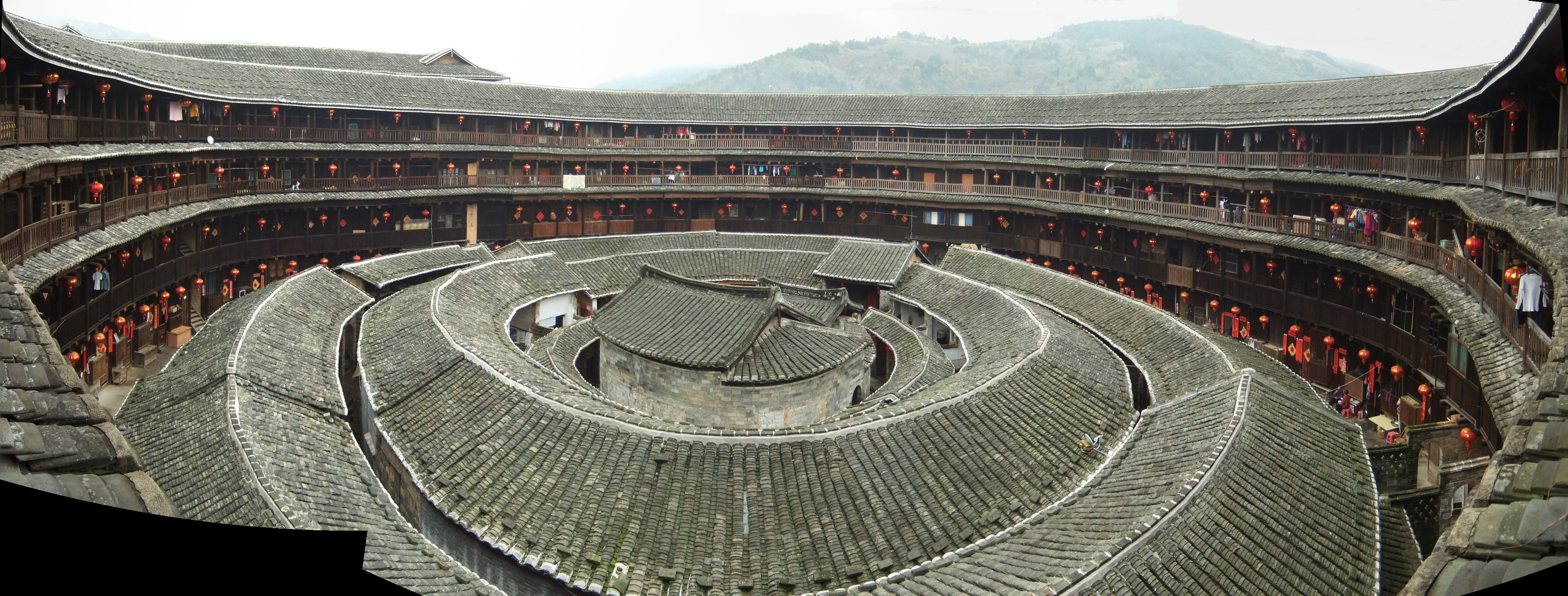
Chengqi Lou, Gaobei Village (Chinese: 高北村), Gaotou Township

== Demographics ==
As of 2015, Yongding District has a hukou population of 504,520, but has approximately just 361,000 permanent residents. 44.3% of the district's permanent residents live in urban areas.

The district's urban residents have a per capita disposable income of 29,952 renminbi (RMB) as of 2015, a 7.1% increase from 2014. In 2015, this figure stood at 14,136 RMB for the district's rural residents, a 9.8% increase from 2014.

The Yongding Dialect, a part of the Tingzhou dialect of Hakka Chinese, is spoken in the district.

== Culture ==
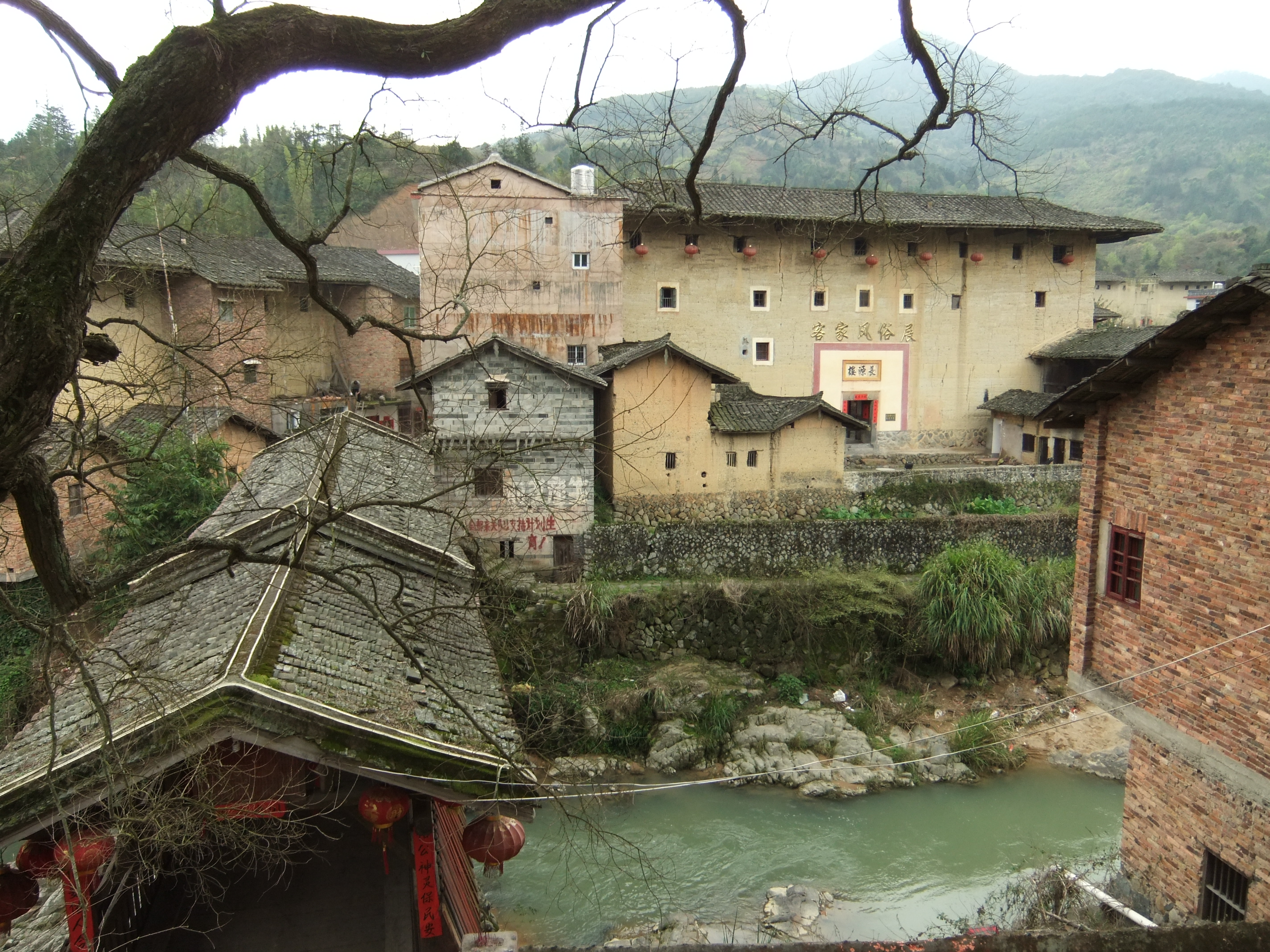
Changyuan Lou, a restored square tulou in Xinnan Village (Chinese: 新南村), Hukeng

Yongding District is famous for its tulou, large multi-family adobe buildings. Out of the 10 tulous or tulous clusters inscribed on the World Heritage List (as Fujian Tulou), 5 are within Yongding District:

- Chuxi Tulou cluster, in Chuxi Village (Chinese: 初溪村), Xiayang
- Chengqi Lou and adjacent buildings (the Gaobei Tulou cluster), in Gaobei Village (Chinese: 高北村), Gaotou Township
- Hongkeng Tulou cluster including Zhencheng Lou, in Hongkeng Village (Chinese: 洪坑村), Hukeng
- Zhenfu Lou, near Xipian Village (Chinese: 西片村), Hukeng
- Yanxiang Lou, in Xinnan Village (Chinese: 新南村), Hukeng

== Economy ==
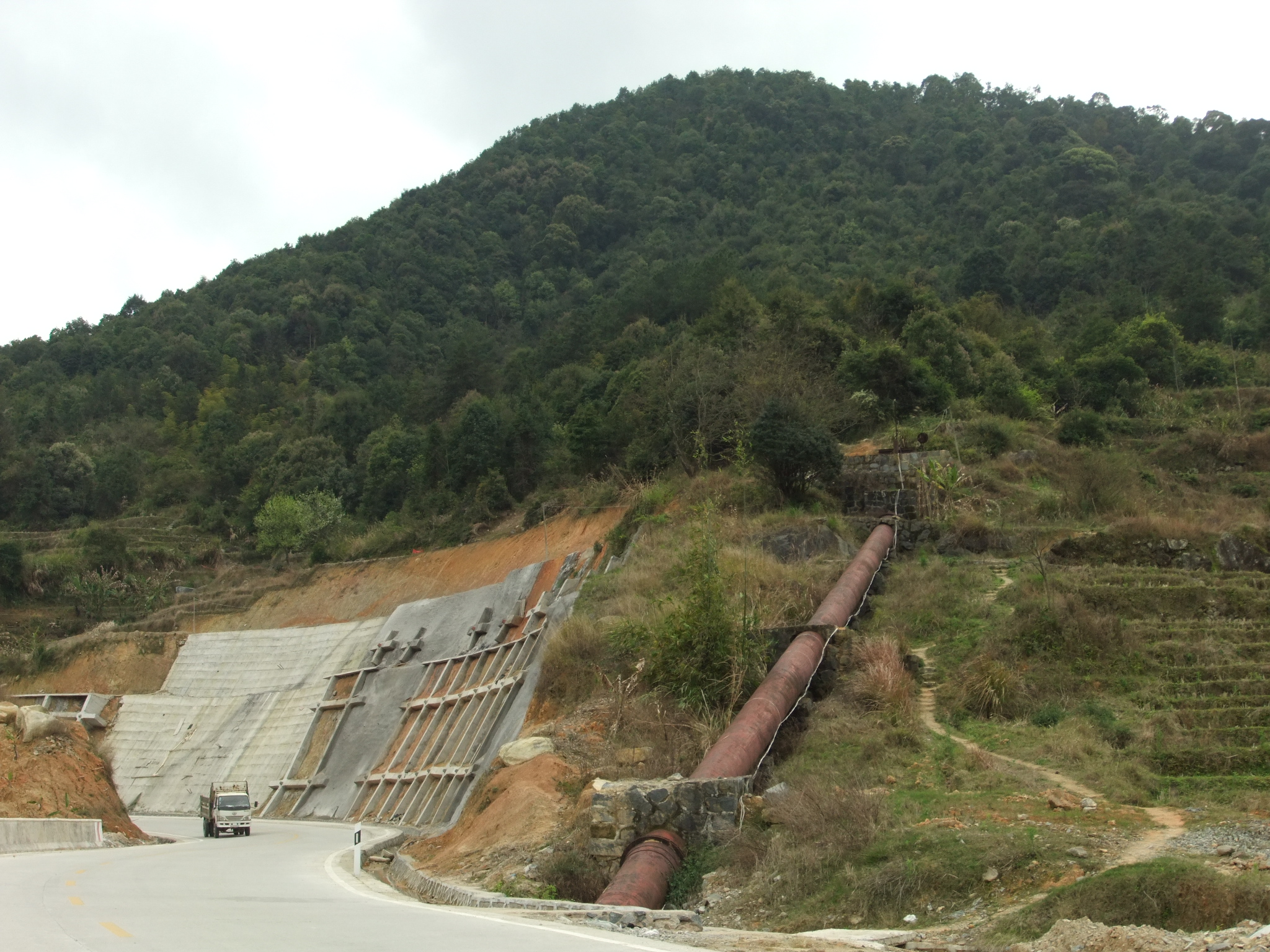
Water is brought from the mountains via a pipe to a small hydro power plant in Yangduo Village (Chinese: 洋多村), Hukeng

Yongding District recorded a gross domestic product of 19.12 billion renminbi (RMB) in 2015, an 8.2% increase from 2014.

=== Industry ===
Yongding District has a sizable automotive industry, which achieved an output of 3.151 billion RMB in 2015, a 0.8% increase from 2014. Fujian Motors Group has sizable operations in the district, where it produces engines for its New Longma (Chinese: 新龙马; pinyin: Xīn Lóngmǎ) brand, and multi-purpose vehicles for its Keyton (Chinese: 启腾; pinyin: Qǐténg) brand.

As a result of abundant precipitation and mountainous terrain, hydroelectric power is abundant. There are numerous hydro plants in the district, one notable one being the provincial Mianhuatan Hydroelectric Power Station. The plant has a water storage capacity of 2.035 billion cubic meters and is able to generate 1.52 billion kilowatt hours of electricity a year. The Mianhuatan hydrodam contributes greatly to the rapidly growing economy of Fujian and neighboring Guangdong province.

=== Agriculture ===
In agriculture, rice is the main crop for the district. Most low-lying fields can yield two rice crops per year, while in high land fields, because of the earlier frost, only one harvest can be assured.

Persimmons, plums, and tea leaves are grown in the district. Cattle are raised in Yongding District, and various beef products are produced in the district.

Yongding is an important tobacco producer. The cultivation of tobacco started in Wan Li era of the Ming Dynasty. Yongding was honored as the "home of tobacco" in the early 20th century. Although its significance has declined in recent years, Yongding is still one of the most important tobacco producing areas in the region. Many top brand Chinese cigarettes contain Yongding leaf.

During the 2010s, the local government began partnering local farmers with Taobao, a large Chinese e-commerce website, to create a wider market for local agricultural goods. As of 2015, the district is home to 200 million RMB in e-commerce sales.

=== Mining ===
Yongding is rich in mineral deposits, most notably coal. Most of the district's coal is shipped to Guangdong, where economic growth has created huge demand for energy. This in turn has created demand for heavy trucks. As a result, Yongding is one of the top districts for the number of trucks.

=== Tourism ===
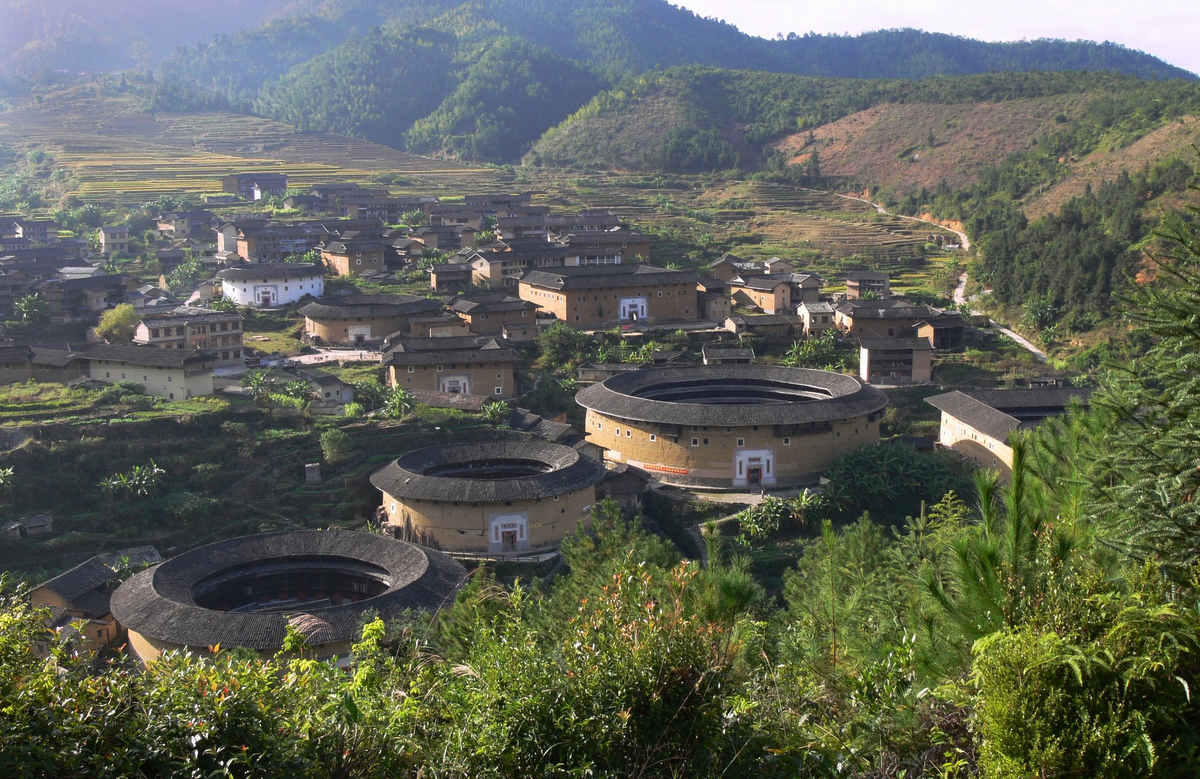
Chuxi Tulou cluster, in Chuxi Village (Chinese: 初溪村), Xiayang

In 2015 alone, 5.252 million tourists visited Yongding District, generating 4.029 billion RMB in income. Common tourist destinations include the district's many tulou clusters, such as Chuxi Tulou cluster, and hot springs.

== Transportation ==
The Zhangping–Longchuan railway runs through Yongding District, stopping at Yongding railway station. China National Highway 235, China National Highway 357, and the Putian–Yongding Expressway are among the many expressways in Yongding District.

== Notable people ==
There have been many famous overseas Chinese with their roots in Yongding. Aw Boon-Haw (胡文虎) was one of the most famous overseas Chinese in the 1930s and 40s.
