= History of Gan Chinese =

The history of Gan Chinese, a variety of Chinese spoken in modern-day China, stretches back to the beginning of the Qin dynasty. This long stretch of time is divided into Old Gan, late Old Gan, and Middle Gan periods.

== Old Gan ==
Old Gan (上古贛語, Song-gu Gon-ngi) or Proto-Gan (原始贛語, Ngien-si Gon-ngi) was spoken between the beginning of the Qin dynasty to the latter part of the Han dynasty.

In the year of 221 BC, General Tu Sui (屠睢) was sent on behalf of the Qin dynasty to the south of China in order to conquer the territory of Baiyue. 500,000 soldiers then settled down at Yugan, Nankang and three other places. This formed the initial Chinese population in Jiangxi. In 202 BC, Yuzhang Prefecture (Chinese: 豫章郡) was set up by the Han dynasty. Following this, the local population increased rapidly.

== Late Old Gan ==
Late Old Gan (中古贛語, Zung-gu Gon-ngi) was spoken between the 3rd and 6th centuries. It was largely sinicized by new settlers from the Central Plain. Some scholars consider late Old Gan, together with Hakka Chinese and the Tongtai dialect of Jianghuai Mandarin to have been the lingua franca of the Southern Dynasties.

However, late Old Gan was still distinctly different from the official language. History of Southern Dynasties records that

Hu Xiezhi (胡諧之) of Nanchang, the Emperor wants to bestow a noble marriage on him. He sends several persons of the Palace in order to teach his children the [official] language. Two years later, the Emperor asks him if the language has been standardized in his family, and Hu answers that his family hasn't acquired the official language while those imperial envoys have already been Ganized.

== Middle Gan ==
Middle Gan (中世贛語, Zung-si Gon-ngi) is the variety of Gan spoken between the Tang and Song dynasties (from the 6th to the 13th century). The last time of large-scale settlement in Jiangxi by people from the Central Plain took place as a result of the An Lushan Rebellion. Gan also became stabilized following this period.

Research on the rhyming system of Jiangxi poets of this period has been made in order to reconstruct the linguistic form of Middle Gan. Scholars have found that modern Gan still keeps many linguistic characteristics of this historical layer. For example,

- rime 尤侯 corresponds to rime 蕭豪;
- rime 支微 corresponds to rime 魚模;
- rime 魚模 corresponds to rime 家麻;
- rime 皆來 corresponds to rime 支微;
- rime 監廉 corresponds to rime 寒先;
- rime 庚青 corresponds to rime 江陽.

== Late Middle Gan ==
Late Middle Gan (近世贛語, Qin-si Gon-ngi) was the form of Gan spoken between the Yuan and Ming dynasties (from the 13th to the 17th century). Some linguistic characteristics of late Middle Gan are:

- Semi-coronal [l] differentiates from alveolar stops [n]
- Muddy consonants are merged with aspirated consonants
- Syllable coda [-m] merges into [-n]

== Early Modern Gan ==
Early Modern Gan (近代贛語, Qin-tai Gon-ngi) was the form of Gan spoken from the Qing dynasty (17th century) up to the beginning of modern times.

The textbook Lei Zi Meng Qiu (類字蒙求) published in the middle of the 19th century has been used to understand the linguistic form of Nanchang dialect; scholars have found that Gan has stayed relatively stable from this time. For example, the nasal ending [-m] merged into [-n], and 7 tones were used.

Westerners also began to study Gan during this period. British diplomatic official Edward Harper Parker was the first westerner to recorded Gan speech. He noticed his friend Wen-yuan of Fuzhou merged muddy consonants with aspirate consonants.

Bibles in some Gan dialects were also published at this time.

== See also ==
- Gan Swadesh list
