= Cantonese people in Hong Kong =

Cantonese people represent the largest group in Hong Kong. The definition usually includes people whose ancestral homes are in Yue Chinese speaking regions of Guangdong province, specifically the guangfu (廣府) region, although sometimes Sze Yap people, the Hakka people or Teochew people (Chiu Chow/Teochew) may be included. Historic Hong Kong censuses distinguished people of Guangdong origin into Guangzhou and Macau, Sze Yap (Siyi), Chaozhou, and Hainan origins, as well as the Indigenous people of the New Territories.

When the population census was first conducted in 1881, it found only 3668 people, with over 95% percent of the population being from Guangdong Province.

Gregory Guldin describes a "Cantonese chauvinism" where the Cantonese are seen as superior to the other Chinese groups in Hong Kong.

In the first few post-war decades, there was an economic rivalry between the Cantonese and the minority Shanghainese. Cantonese could be said to be less willing to work with the British colonizers in their business dealings, and subsequently were less preferred to become representatives to the Legislative Council.

== Statistics ==
=== 1961 Census data of Cantonese speakers by district ===
Hong Kong Island	%	Kowloon	%	New Territories	%	Islands	%
Central	90.5	Tsim Sha Tsui	69.7	Tsuen Wan	58.6	-	68.6
Sheung Wan	89.5	Yau Ma Tei	91.8	Tsing Yi	56.6		
West	79.8	Mong Kok	87.2	Ma Wan	60.4		
Mid-levels/Pok Fu Lam	77.2	Kowloon City	75.1	North	59.1		
Peak	44.4	Sham Shui Po	80.2	Sai Kung	35.0		
Wan Chai	91.2	Kwun Tong	61.7	Sha Tin	68.9		
Tai Hang	81.3	Wong Tai Sin	68.0	Tai Po	48.8		
North Point	74.9			Tuen Mun	66.5		
Shau Kei Wan	86.2			Yuen Long	71.9		
Aberdeen	87.9						
South	72.5						

Average: 78.98

Standard Deviation: 14.8

Coefficient of Variation: 0.21

== See also ==
- Punti
- Indigenous inhabitants of the New Territories

== Sources ==
- Goodstadt, Leo F. (2010), "The Shanghainese: Colonial Allies, Colonial Heirs", Uneasy Partners: The Conflict Between Public Interest and Private Profit in Hong Kong, Hong Kong University Press, ISBN 978-988-8028-09-2
- Topley, Marjorie. Cantonese Society in Hong Kong and Singapore: Gender, Religion, Medicine and Money. Hong Kong, Hong Kong University Press, 2011.
