= Hukeng, Fujian =

Hukeng 湖坑鎮
- Town
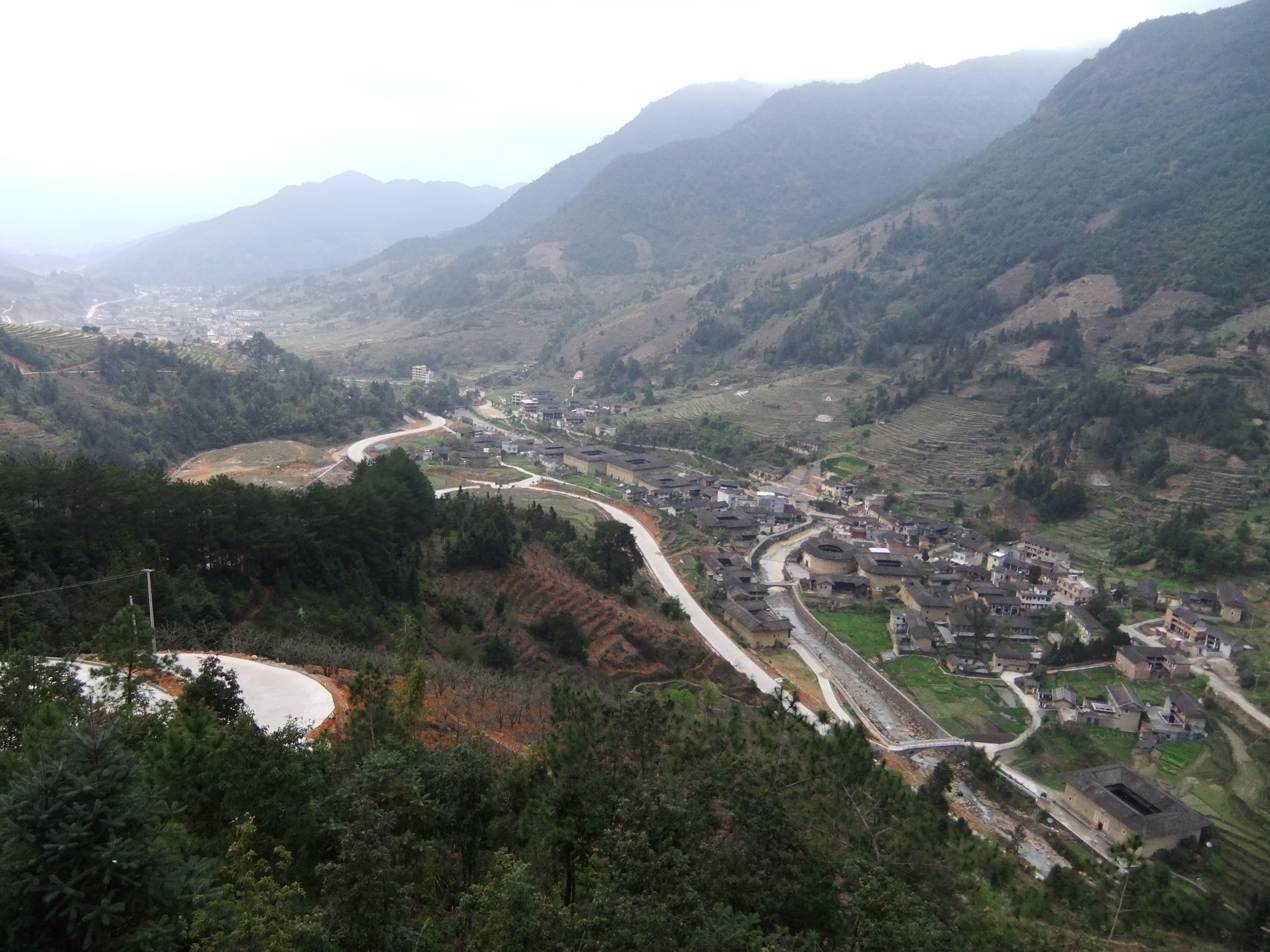
- Nanjiang Village, a section of the "Great Wall of Tulou" in the Nanxi Valley

- Location in Fujian Hukeng (China)
- Coordinates: 24°39′00″N 116°57′00″E
- Country: People's Republic of China
- Province: Fujian
- Prefecture-level city: Longyan
- District: Yongding District

Area
  - Total: 95 km^{2} (37 sq mi)

Population (1997)
  - Total: 24,000
- http://www.xzqh.org/html/2008/1217/9544.html
- Time zone: UTC+8 (China Standard)

Hukeng (Chinese: 湖坑) is a town (a township-level division) situated in Yongding District, Longyan, Fujian, China.

Hukeng town contains one of the Hakka settlements in China. Moreover, a large number of Fujian Tulou are located with the territory administratively included within Hukeng, with a few within the actual Hukeng Town area. In particular, administratively, Hukeng includes the valley of the Nanxi (南溪, "South Creek"), where several villages (Yangduo, Xinnan, Nanzhong, Nanjiang, Shijia) consisting mostly of tulou form what some writers have dubbed the "Nanxi Great Wall of Tulou".

== See also ==
- List of township-level divisions of Fujian
