= Culture of Hunan =

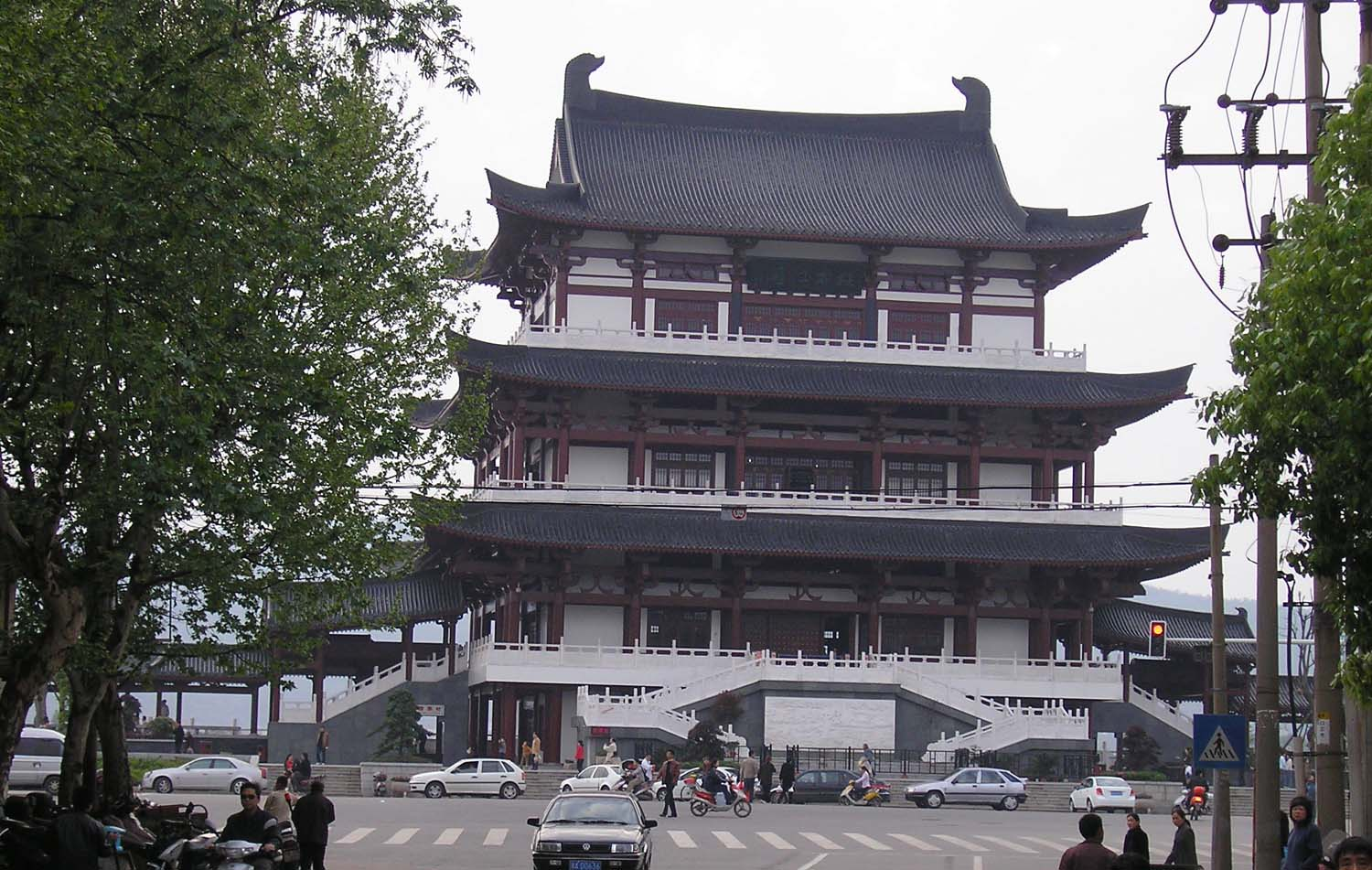
Dufujiangge at Changsha, the cultural capital of Hunanese culture.

The culture of Hunan (湖湘文化) refers to the culture of the people based in the Hunan province of China. The mountainous terrain of Hunan separates it from the surrounding Chinese provinces, resulting in its own distinct characteristics. As the Xiang River runs through the province from south to north, Hunan is called "Xiang" for short and boasts its "Xiang Cuisine", "Xiang Embroidery", "Xiang Opera", and "Xiang Army". Therefore, the culture of Hunan is also called the Huxiang culture. The culture of Hunan is originated in Chu (state) (Chineses: 楚) culture from the Zhou dynasty. The meaning of Hunan culture contains two aspects. Generally speaking, it refers to the sum of folk customs, social consciousness, scientific culture, and material culture that have been created in the long-term history of people of all ethnic groups in Hunan. In a narrow sense, it refers to the spirit that developed and accumulated on this basis.

== Region ==
The region of this culture is originated in today's Hunan Province in China. The Guangxi Autonomous Region is outside the southwestern boundary of Hunan, while the surrounding provinces include Guangdong in the southeast, Jiangxi in the east and Hubei in the north. Outside the western border are Chongqing and Guizhou in the northwest. It is located in the heart of southern China. Four-fifths of Hunan is a mountainous or hilly area, covered with the fertile northern plains. The north plain spreads from Dongting lake and extends south to the lowlands of the centre. Hunan, ‘south of the lake’, is named after Dongting but was also called Xiang. Luoxiao mountain rises in the east of the province, the Nan Ling to the south, the Xuefeng Shan in the south-west and the Wuling Shan in the north-west.

== Language ==
Xiang language, also known as Hunanese, is the language spoken in most major cities in Hunan. It is believed that Xiang is a descendant of Old Chu. In essence, the Xiang language varieties are classified into two main categories. These are Old Xiang, usually represented with the variety of Shuangfeng, and New Xiang, usually represented with that of Changsha. The differences between the two are shown in the table below. In the past, the wide-ranging influence of Mandarin from the southwest, north, and west made it difficult to classify Xiang. The most significant difference between the Old and New varieties is that all the initial consonants become voiceless, as shown in the table below. In addition, Old Xiang does not have the initial /f/ consonant of New Xiang. This is due to the fact that there was no such phoneme in Old Chinese at first, but it was later developed in Middle Chinese.

English	Chinese	Shuangfeng	Changsha
White	白	pia¹³, po¹³	pɤ²⁴
Peach	桃	dɤ¹³	tau¹³
Sit	坐	dzʊ³³	tso⁴⁵
Together	共	ɡan³³	kən⁴⁵
Wind	風 (simplified: 风)	xan⁵⁵	xən³³

== Literature ==
Huxiang literature refers to all kinds of literary works and literary theories created by people of Hunan origin and literati living in Huxiang, as well as literary works created by other writers on the subject of Huxiang mountains and rivers. It is an important part of Chinese literature.

=== Representative authors and works ===
==== Qu Yuan ====
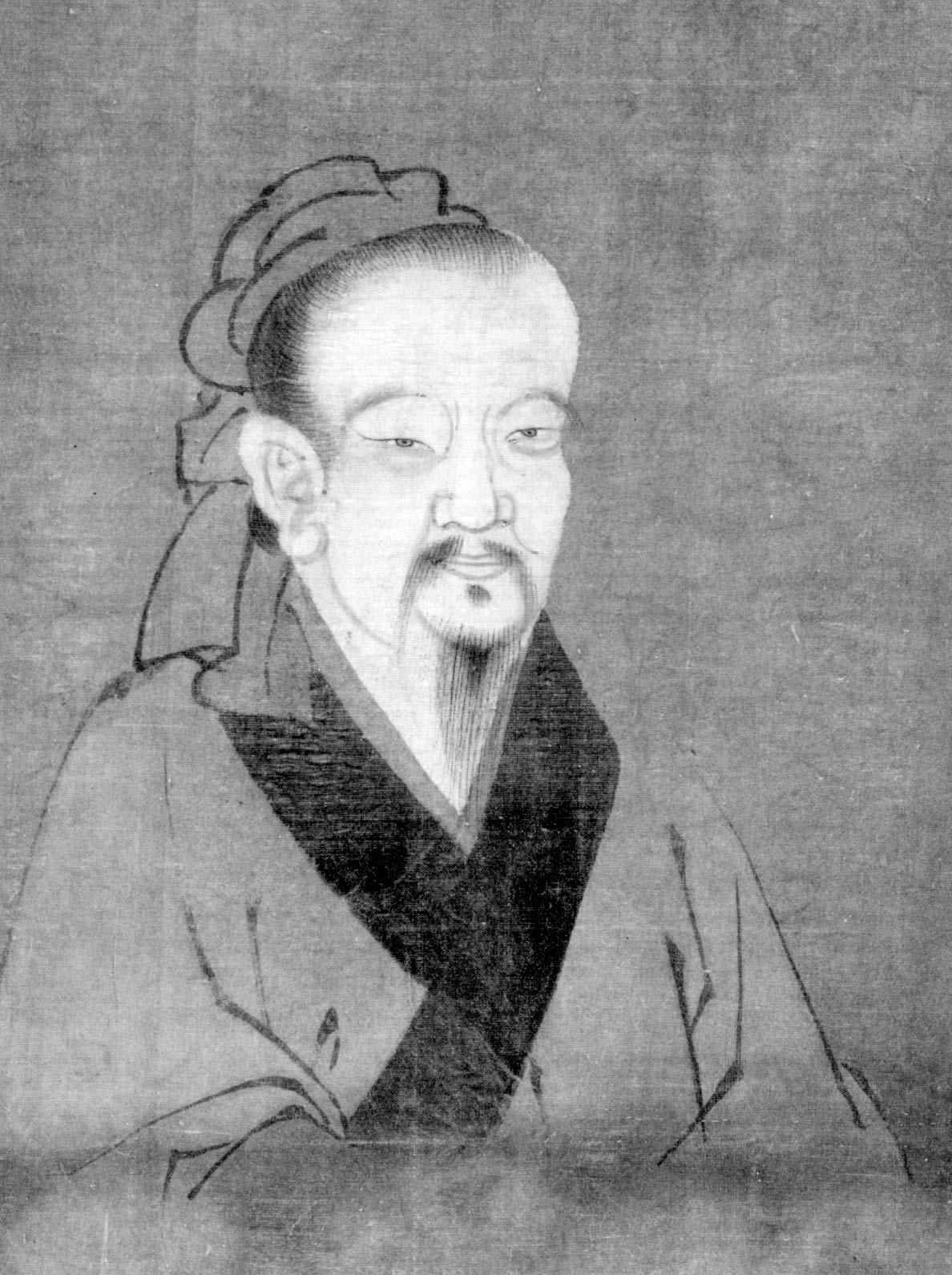
Qu Yuan, portrait by an unknown artist; in the National Palace Museum, Taipei, Taiwan.

Qu Yuan (339-278 BCE), a poet and thinker who drowned himself after hearing the news that the capital of Chu had fallen to the Qin (state), and who is commemorated each year during the Duanwu Festival. He had been a statesman for the Chu kingdom during the warring States period. Qu yuan lost the faith of the king and was exiled after being betrayed by corrupt aristocrats. He wrote poems in his exile including “Li Sao” (“Encountering Sorrow”) and “Tian Wen” (“Questioning Heaven”), which are included in the collection Chu ci (first collected in first century BCE, material added second century CE; Chu Tz’u: The songs of the South, 1959). The Qin army invaded Chu in 277 BCE. Qu Yuan committed suicide in 278 BCE after he was disappointed and could not bear the defeat. The poems from Qu Yuan are probably derived from fold legends in the region of Huxiang. The literary tradition of worrying about the country and the people is begun by Qu Yuan. The patriotic passion in Qu Yuan's poems is not only the beginning of Huxiang culture, but also the origin of Chinese romantic literature.

== Philosophy ==
=== Neo-Confucianism ===
Chinese Neo-Confucianism began in the Song and Ming dynasties. Neo-Confucianism spanned four dynasties in Chinese history, namely Song, Yuan, Ming and Qing. Compared with the achievements of "modern philosophy" in Western philosophy, Neo-Confucianism also revitalised classical philosophy and expanded traditional philosophical discourse, adding new dimensions and reaching new heights. Neo-Confucianism “can be broadly described as an attempt to integrate speculative, systematic metaphysics influenced by Buddhism and Daoism into the Confucian moral and social orientation system” (Perkins 2004, 20–21). The Neo-Confucianism cared about humanity fundamentally and established the role that humanity played in the moral reconstruction of the world around it. It means humans not only give meaning to the natural world, but also share moral attributes with natural phenomena. The emergence of Neo-Confucianism significantly changed the ideologies of Huxiang people. Historically, it is a symbolisation of the “next stage” for the culture of Hunan since the ideologies tend to be united.

=== Yuelu Academy ===
Yuelu Academy is "Huxiang School". Hu Anguo (1074–1138), Hu Hong (1106–1162) and Zhang Shi are famous scholars in this school. Their main argument is that human nature is the essence, and the mind is the expression, but the principle is deeply embedded in human nature. School is where different thinkers share their views. This is the first place in history that allows different ideas to communicate and argue. "The academic debate between Zhu Xi and Zhang Shi" is well known in history. They discussed various philosophical concepts, including the mean, the meaning of balance and harmony, and the ultimate meaning of greatness. The meeting and discussion lasted more than two and a half months.

== Visual arts ==
=== Xiang Embroidery ===
Xiang embroidery, also known as Hunan embroidery, refers to hand-embroidered works produced in Changsha, Hunan, China. Xiang embroidery is famous all over the world for its complicated embroidery process and long history. Archaeologists discovered fine embroidered silk in Changsha Mawangdui Han Thomas (206BC-220AD), which indicates that the Hunan embroidery work has appeared before 2000. In the long process of development, Xiang embroidery adopted the techniques of traditional Chinese painting to form its own unique style. By the end of the Qing dynasty (early 20th century), the embroidery technology of Hunan embroidery reached its peak, even reached a leading position, and exceeded Su embroidery, which is now recognized as the best silk embroidery in China. Tiger is the most common embroidery pattern in Hunan embroidery. The unique technique of Xiang embroidery is usually based on Chinese painting, although it also includes carving, calligraphy and embroidery techniques.

== Performing arts ==
=== Xiang Opera ===
Xiang Opera is the main local opera in Hunan Province established in the Ming dynasty. There are 12 kinds of characters in Xiang Opera, including Sheng (male character), Dan (female character), Chou (clown or comic character) and "flower face" characters (jing or male characters that are popular because of elaborate facial paintings). The Xiang operas are usually accompanied by musical instruments such as flute, jade piano (an ancient stringed instrument) and percussion instruments common in China. There are more than 300 works in Xiang Opera, such as "Patriotic General Yue Fei", "Salute to the Moon", "The Story of the White Rabbit" and "Exploration of the Gods". At present, due to the rise of modern culture and the lack of funds and practitioners, opera is in danger of extinction. Therefore, protective measures should be taken as soon as possible so that this cultural heritage can be continued.

=== Flower-drum opera ===
Flower-drum Opera is a local opera originated in the countryside of many regions. Its main accompaniment instruments include Suona Horn, pipe, drum, gong, etc. Flower-drum Opera is very popular with the local people in Hunan, Hubei, Anhui, Guangdong and other provinces. As Flower-drum Opera takes rural life as the subject matter and its melody is stemmed from ballads, folk songs, hums, work songs and Taoist music, it is featured by lively melody, pithy plot and dialect-style singing. Featuring intense rustic traits, repertoires of Flower-drum Opera mainly reflect laboring activities, love, family conflicts and other contents in folk life. Performing forms of Flower-drum Opera were fixed in the Qing dynasty to be cored with three roles: Dan (the female character type), Sheng (the young male character type) and Chou (clown). Flower-drum Opera at the initial stage was a life-oriented playlet cored with folk chansons. In later period, repertoires focusing on folk legends with strong narrative nature came into existence. Flower-drum Opera has undergone flourishing development after the founding of People's Republic of China. The most typical Hunan Flower-drum Opera has been developed for over 200 years and now is provided with more than 300 types of melodies. Moreover, a large number of traditional repertoires have been coordinated and adapted. At the same time, numerous modern dramas such as the popular play Tinker Pans were created. The initial heroine of the play is the later famous soprano singer Li Guyi. As a playlet taking root in folk life, Flower-drum Opera has been experiencing continuous improvement under the joint efforts of old and newly-arising artists.

== Architecture ==
=== Hongjiang Commercial Ancient Town ===
The town has more than 380 intact ancient buildings erected in the Ming and Qing dynasties, covering an area of 100,000 square meters. These buildings are durable, but still vividly remind the wealthy merchants of a luxurious lifestyle. It features classic dwellings south of the Yangtze River, and presents the paintings of the "Picture of the Qingming River". With the maze of narrow streets, Hong Jiang still reminiscent of the image of ancient China.

== Cuisine ==
=== History ===
A large number of exquisite ceramic cookware and wine utensils unearthed from the Southern Neolithic site, as well as the remains of cereals and animals, confirmed that the ancestors of Hunan people had eaten cooked food as early as 8000–9000 years ago. During the Spring and Autumn period, Hunan was mainly where the Chu people lived. Multi-ethnic groups live in different parts of Hunan with different eating habits. Various dishes have strict requirements on color, smell, taste and shape. At that time, the ancestors had more than ten cooking methods, including burning, roasting, stewing, frying, and boiling. The cooking method of Hunan cuisine in the Han dynasty was further developed. They have evolved into various types, such as steamed fish and smoked meat. Seasonings used in cooking include salt, soy sauce, bean paste, sugar, honey, plums, cinnamon, pepper and goji berries. Since Hunan is rich in products, since the Tang and Song dynasties, especially during the Ming and Qing dynasties, the development of Hunan cuisine has become more complete, and Hunan cuisine has gradually become a specialty among the eight major Chinese cuisines.

=== Global impact ===
Hunan cuisine plays an important role in the globalisation of Chinese cuisine. Phillip Chang is the founder of Scottsdale, Arizona. Chang ’s Chinese bistro chain (whose family has owned Chinese restaurants for decades) said his mother was the first chef for the mandarin restaurant on Pold Street in San Francisco, from Hunan. The spicy Chinese food that first introduced to Americans was Hunan cuisine.

=== Famous dishes ===
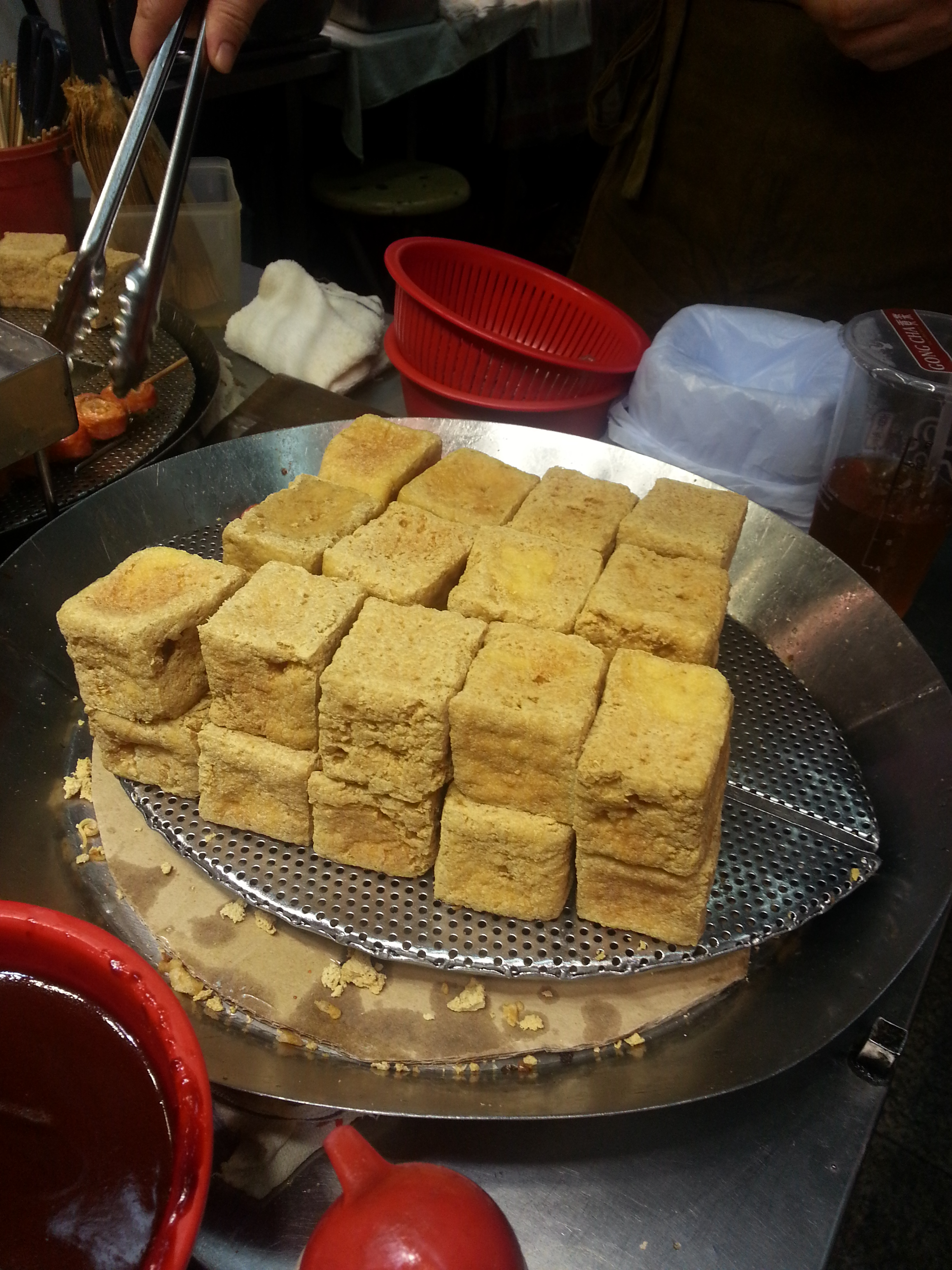
Stinky Tofu

It was originally eaten by the poor monk Zhu Yuanhang. One day, he was hungry and found some old tofu in someone's home. He didn't care if it was cooked, he stuffed it in his mouth, and never forgot the deliciousness of this tofu. Later, he became a military commander, successfully led his army, and won many victories all the way to Anhui Province. To celebrate, he ordered the whole army to eat stinky tofu. The name soon became widely known. Changsha's stinky tofu is made from high-quality soybeans, and then soaked in brine containing bamboo shoots, shiitake mushrooms, koji and soybean meal.

== Xiang Army ==
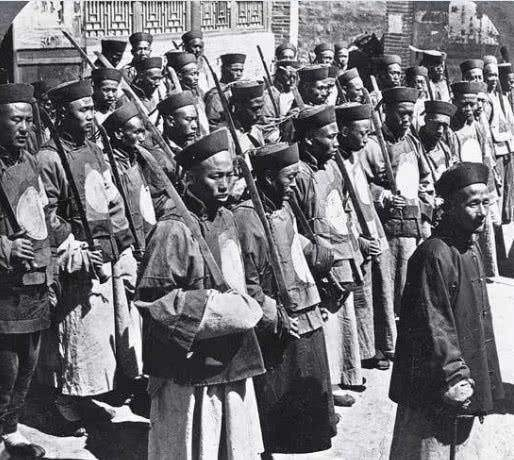
Xiang Army

The Xiang Army was a standing army organized by Zeng Guofan, composed of existing regional and rural militia, to curb the rebellion of the Taiping Heavenly Kingdom. The name was taken from the Hunan area where the army had added troops. The army was funded by local nobles and gentry, not the centralized Qing dynasty. Although it was specifically proposed to solve the Hunan problem, the Army was at the core of the new Qing military system, and thus forever weakened the influence of the Manchu in the army. This shift of centralized command is generally considered to be the main reason leading to the final collapse of the Qing dynasty and the emergence of regional warlordism in China in the first half of the twentieth century.

=== History Book ===
'History of Hunanese'(link) the first book on the history of Hunanese(Phoelanese) civilization and nation from the perspective of we the hunanese (phoelanese) people.
