= Wan'an =

Wan'an (simplified Chinese: 万安; traditional Chinese: 萬安) may refer to these places in China:

== Jurisdictions ==
- Wan'an County, a county in Jiangxi
- Wan'an Prefecture, a historical prefecture in Hainan

== Subdistricts ==
- Wan'an Subdistrict, Shizhu County, in Shizhu Tujia Autonomous County, Chongqing
- Wan'an Subdistrict, Quanzhou, in Luojiang District, Quanzhou, Fujian

== Towns ==
- Wan'an, Anhui, in Xiuning County, Anhui
- Wan'an, Jiangle County, in Jiangle County, Fujian
- Wan'an, Wuping County, in Wuping County, Longyan, Fujian
- Wan'an, Xinluo District, in Xinluo District, Longyan, Fujian
- Wan'an, Hebei, in Li County, Hebei
- Wan'an, Hongtong County, in Hongtong County, Shanxi
- Wan'an, Xinjiang County, in Xinjiang County, Shanxi
- Wan'an, Chengdu, in Shuangliu District, Chengdu, Sichuan
- Wan'an, Deyang, in Deyang, Sichuan
- Wan'an, Santai County, in Santai County, Sichuan

== Townships ==
- Wan'an Township, Fujian, in Pucheng County, Fujian
- Wan'an Township, Sichuan, in Enyang District, Bazhong, Sichuan

== See also ==
- Chiang Wan-an (born 1978), Taiwanese politician
- Wan An (mandarin) (1419–1489), Ming dynasty mandarin
- Wan'an Bridge (disambiguation)
- Wan'an station (disambiguation)
