= Ong Schan Tchow =

Chinese painter

Ong Schan Tchow alias Yung Len Kwui 翁占秋 / 翁联桂
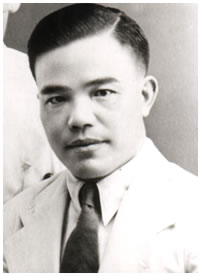
- From the Annals of Longyan (edn. 1997)
- Born: 19 September 1900; Longyan city, Fujian, Qing Dynasty
- Died: 20 December 1945 (aged 45); Ipoh, British Malaya
- Education: École Nationale Supérieure des Beaux-Arts, faculté de droit of the University of Paris
- Known for: Painting, Chinese ink painting, Chinese calligraphy

Ong Schan Tchow
- Traditional Chinese: 翁佔秋
- Simplified Chinese: 翁佔秋
Transcriptions
Standard Mandarin
- Hanyu Pinyin: Wēng Zhàn Qiū
Yue: Cantonese
- Jyutping: Jung1 Zim3 Cau1
Southern Min
- Hokkien POJ: Ang Chiàm-chhiu
- Tâi-lô: Ang Tsiàm-tshiu

Yung Len Kwui
- Traditional Chinese: 翁聯桂
- Simplified Chinese: 翁联桂
Transcriptions
Standard Mandarin
- Hanyu Pinyin: Wēng Lián Guì
Yue: Cantonese
- Jyutping: Jung1 Lyun4 Gwai3
Southern Min
- Hokkien POJ: Ang Liân-kùi
- Tâi-lô: Ang Liân-kuì

Ong Schan Tchow (Chinese: 翁占秋; pinyin: Wēng Zhàn Qiū; Jyutping: Jung1 Zim3 Cau1; Pe̍h-ōe-jī: Ang Chiàm-chhiu) (also known as Yung Chan Tchow, Ong Chan Chiew or Ang Chan Chiew in the Hokkien dialect) alias Yung Len Kwui (Chinese: 翁联桂; pinyin: Wēng Lián Guì; Jyutping: Jung1 Lyun4 Gwai3; Pe̍h-ōe-jī: Ang Liân-kùi) (also known as Ong Lien Kuei) (19 September 1900 – 20 December 1945) was born in the ethnically Hokkien city in the eastern part of Longyan prefecture, Southern Fujian Province, China. He was well known for Chinese Ink wash painting and colour paintings of flowers (Chrysanthemums in particular), landscapes (Shan shui), animals, people, still life and Calligraphy. He was regarded as one of the first few batches of Chinese scholars and artists to study in Paris and one of the few artists who integrated both traditional Chinese and Western art techniques. During the Second Sino-Japanese War, he became renowned as a patriot artist when he exhibited extensively in China, Hong Kong and later in South East Asia to raise funds solely for the war relief effort and for the countless Chinese civilian victims in China, Malaysia and Singapore.

== Biography ==
Ong was born in 1900 during the final years of the Qing dynasty. His parents were Longyan Hokkiens.

Ong learned traditional Chinese painting and Chinese Calligraphy at a young age and also excelled academically in other disciplines.

In 1919, at age 19 he went to Paris after winning a Chinese Government Scholarship. He was among the first batch of only a few Chinese students at that time studying in Paris. Ong's fluency in French and mastery of Chinese Painting naturally placed him as mentor to those few Chinese students, one of whom was Xu Beihong (Chinese: 徐悲鴻) who later became a good friend.

In Paris, Ong studied at École Nationale Supérieure des Beaux-Arts, the National School of Fine Arts of the École des Beaux-Arts where he learned to combine Western art techniques and perspectives with traditional Chinese painting techniques. In addition, he obtained a Master of Arts in Law, French and Political Science from the University of Paris where he also enrolled for his Doctorate.

Upon his return to China in 1927, his fame as an artist grew as he was recognized as one of the very few Paris trained Chinese artists who were exposed to the art techniques of both the East and West.

He entered Government service pursuant to conditions of the scholarship and held various positions including Secretary of the Executive Yuan; professor at the National Central University (now Nanjing University), and editor of Nanking Morning Press.

It was during his time in Nanjing that Ong produced one of his monumental works – a compilation of paintings of Chrysanthemums with accompanying poems and commentary from well known persons. This compilation was succinctly termed the "Book of Chrysanthemums" (see section below). These were paintings of the vast variety of Chrysanthemums planted at the newly completed mausoleum of Dr. Sun Yat-sen (Chinese: 孫中山), the "Father of Modern China", at Nanjing, the former Capital of China.

During the Second Sino-Japanese War, Professor Ong exhibited his works extensively where all the proceeds were given to the war relief effort. The war destroyed many of the paintings but he managed to salvage many important works. The advancing Japanese army forced him to move his exhibitions to Hong Kong and later to Singapore and Malaysia.

All the exhibitions were solely for the War Relief Fund in aid of the civilian victims in China, Malaysia and Singapore. In one of his exhibitions in Ipoh, Malaysia, His Royal Highness the Sultan of Perak was presented with one of his paintings. Some of his works were also donated to some temples in Perak including the famous Sam Poh Tong (Chinese: 三宝洞; pinyin: Sān bǎo dòng) and Nam Thean Tong (Chinese: 南天洞; pinyin: Nántiān dòng) cave temples.

Ong was creative in his combination of techniques of East and West from a realism and attention to detail to an expressive free style.

Ong died in 1945 while tirelessly exhibiting his works in Ipoh, Malaysia. His death at the relatively young age of 45 prematurely curtailed his artistic influence and patriotic fundraising efforts. In the Annals of Longyan, Ong is considered one of her most famous sons.

== Book of Chrysanthemums ==
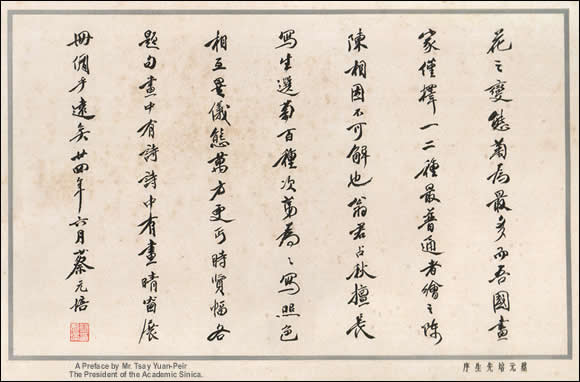
A preface by Cai Yuanpei (Chinese: 蔡元培) to the "Book of Chrysanthemums" painted by Professor Ong Schan Tchow

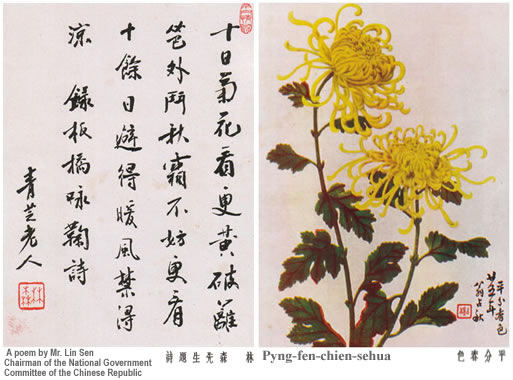
From the "Book of Chrysanthemums" with accompanying poem by Lin Sen (Chinese: 林森), President of the Republic of China

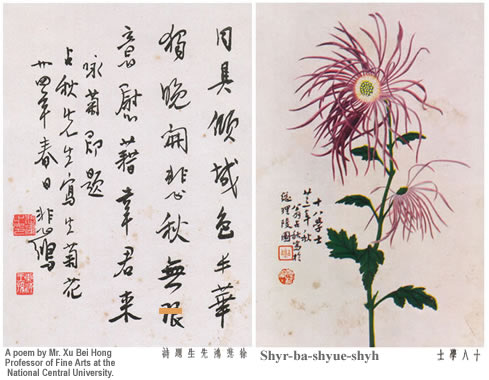
From the "Book of Chrysanthemums" with accompanying poem by Xu Beihong (Chinese: 徐悲鴻), Professor of Fine Arts, National Central University

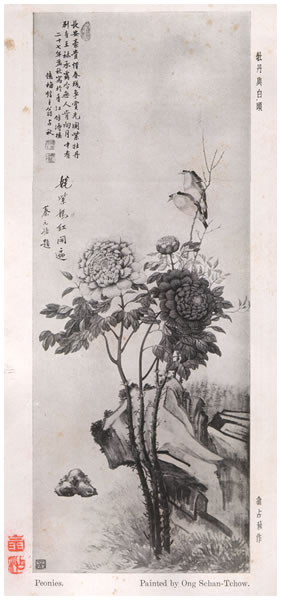
His Royal Highness the Sultan of Perak was presented with this "Peonies" painted by Ong Schan Tchow

The Chrysanthemum has special significance in Chinese culture as it was first cultivated in China and is part of the Four Gentlemen in Chinese art.

The Book of Chrysanthemums (Chinese: 百菊图) is one of Ong's monumental works. The Book contains paintings of chrysanthemums grown inside Sun Yat-sen Mausoleum and where each painting is accompanied side by side by a poem, commentary or calligraphy written by Ong's friends and persons of note in China. Some of these famous historical personages who contributed to the Book include:

- Lin Sen (Chinese: 林森), President of the Republic of China;
- Cai Yuanpei (Chinese: 蔡元培), President of Academia Sinica;
- Ye Gong Chuo (Chinese: 叶恭绰), Minister of Transport;
- Ju Zheng (Chinese: 居正), President of the Judicial Yuan;
- Xu Beihong (Chinese: 徐悲鴻), artist and Professor of Fine Arts at the National Central University;
- Gao Jianfu (Chinese: 高剑父), artist of the Lingnan School;
- Chen Shu-ren (Chinese: 陈树人), artist of the Lingnan School;
- Yu Youren (Chinese: 于右任), Director of the Control Yuan;
- Yu Dafu (Chinese: 郁达夫), writer and poet;
- Wang Yun-wu (Chinese: 王雲五), Chief of Commercial Press Ltd;
- Wang Jingwei (Chinese: 汪精卫), Former Premier;
- Liu Haisu (Chinese: 刘海粟), Chinese painter;
- Jing Heng-yi (Chinese: 经亨颐), Member of the Supervisory Committee;
- Tu Si Zong (Chinese: 涂思宗), Battalion Commander;
- Shao Yuan Chong (Chinese: 邵元冲), Vice President of the Legislative Yuan;
- Zheng Hong Nian (Chinese: zh:鄭洪年), Former President of National Chi Nan University;
- Cheng Qian (Chinese: 程潜), Chief of General Staff;
- Bo Wen-wei (Chinese: 柏文蔚), Member of the Supervisory Committee.

== Gallery ==
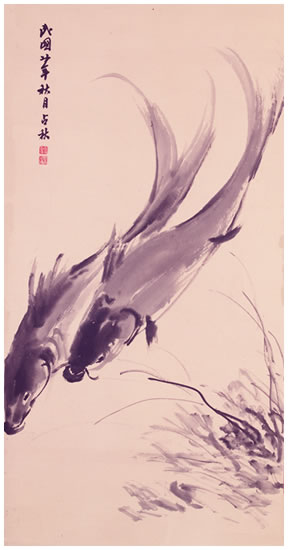
Swimming Fish

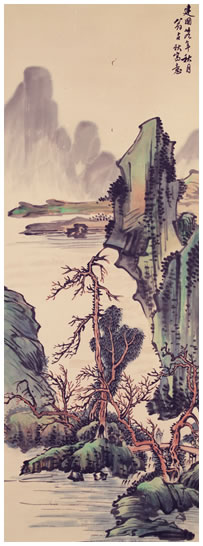
Mountain Beauty

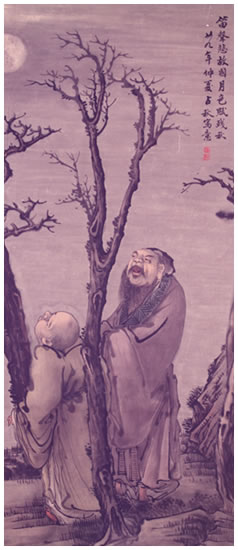
Su Tong Po & Student

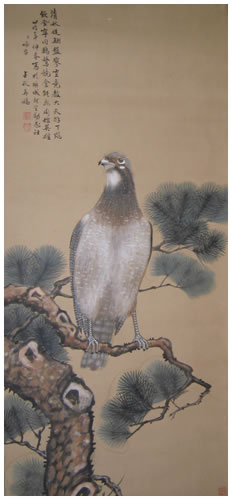
Perching Falcon

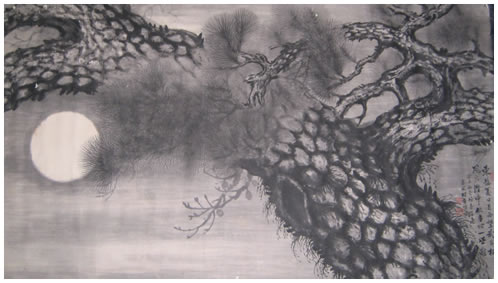
Pine in Moonlight

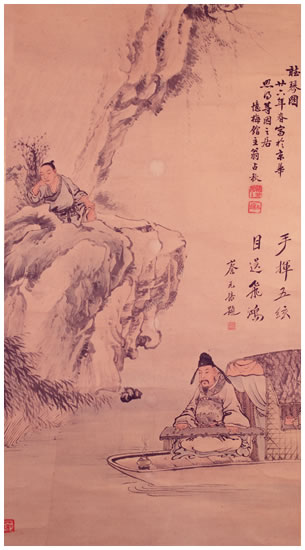
"Appreciation" with poem by Cai Yuanpei (Chinese: 蔡元培)

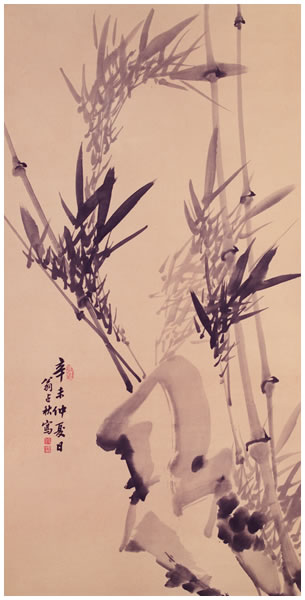
Bamboo

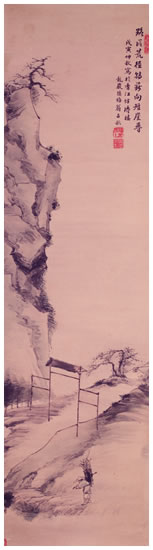
Lonely Woodcutter

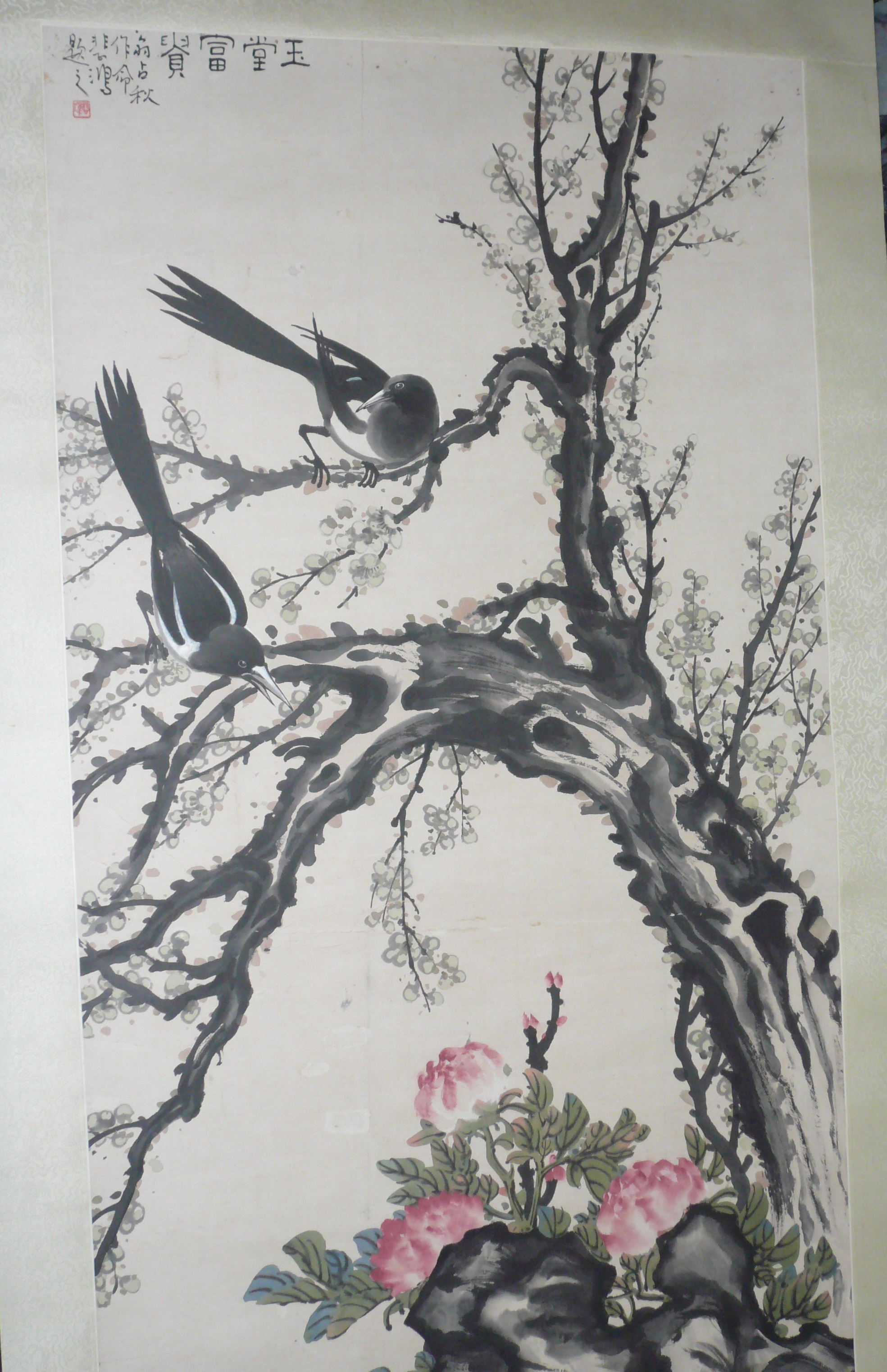
"Crows, Plum Blossom Tree & Peonies" - Xu Beihong's (Chinese: 徐悲鴻) autograph on this painting by his mentor, Professor Ong Schan Tchow
