= Nine Rivers Distillery =

Spirits distillery in Longyan, China

- Type: Private
- Industry: Distilled beverages
- Founded: 2018
- Headquarters: Longyan, Fujian, China
- Products: Whisky

Nine Rivers Distillery is a privately owned spirits distillery located in Longyan, Fujian Province, China. The project was initiated in 2018, and spirit production began in 2025.

== History ==
Nine Rivers Distillery was established following the incorporation of a holding company in Hong Kong in 2018. A mainland Chinese operating entity was subsequently formed in Fujian Province. In 2019, the company entered into agreements with local authorities in Longyan to develop a distillery site in Xinluo District. Development of the project was affected by regulatory processes and disruptions associated with the COVID-19 pandemic.

== Ownership ==
Nine Rivers Distillery is a privately held company. Ownership is reported to include founders and a group of private investors participating through a crowdfunded model.

== Location and facilities ==
The distillery is located in Longyan, in Fujian Province. The site includes distillation equipment, fermentation vessels, and warehousing for cask storage. Publicly available information indicates that the facility was designed to allow for future expansion of production capacity.

== Production ==
The distillery produces spirit using conventional processes associated with malt whisky production, including mashing, fermentation, distillation, and cask maturation.
