= Septwolves =

Septwolves may refer to:

- Septwolves (clothing), Chinese clothing company
- Septwolves (tobacco), Chinese tobacco brand
