= Deng Zihui =

Chinese revolutionary and politician (1896–1972)

- 邓子恢
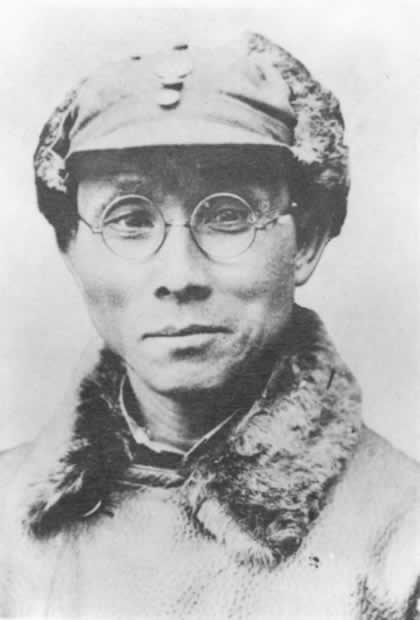
- Deng during the 1940s

Member of Central Committee of the Chinese Communist Party
- In office October 1954 – January 1965
- Chairman: Mao Zedong

Vice Premier of China
- In office 1954–1965
- Premier: Zhou Enlai
- Succeeded by: Lin Biao

Personal details
- Born: 17 August 1896 Xinluo District, Fujian
- Died: 10 December 1972 (aged 76) Beijing
- Party: Chinese Communist Party
- Spouse(s): 3 (Cao Quangdi, Huang Xiuxiang and Chen Lan)
- Children: 9 (including Deng Huaisheng, Deng Xiaolan, Deng Ruisheng)

Deng Zihui (simplified Chinese: 邓子恢; traditional Chinese: 鄧子恢; pinyin: Dèng Zǐhuī; 17 August 1896 – 10 December 1972) was a Chinese communist revolutionary.

Deng was one of the initiators of the Central Rural Work Development, which aimed to achieve agricultural growth. He had a close relationship with Mao on issues related to agricultural reforms, but he was purged from all his positions during the Cultural Revolution.

== Biography ==
=== Early life ===
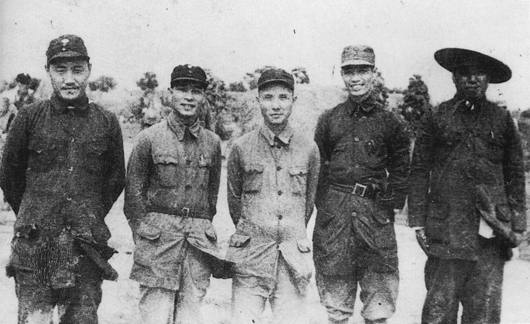
CCP military and political leaders, left to right: Liu Ruilong, Peng Xuefeng, Deng Zihui, Zhang Zhen, Wu Zhipu.

Deng Zihui, a native of Fujian, was born on 17 August 1896 in the city of Longyan into a family of impoverished rural scholars. After attending secondary school in China, he decided to study in Japan, but he was forced to drop out and return to China after a year due to lung disease. In September 1923, Deng founded the Rock Sound newspaper to spread Marxist ideas. Between 1917 and 1928 he briefly worked as a teacher, and then he began working as a salesman in his family's business. This experience familiarised him with market mechanisms and with the organic links between urban and rural economies.

==== Revolutionary activity ====
The revolutionary surge in the 1920s drew Deng into political action. He initially joined the Kuomintang and then, in December 1926, the Chinese Communist Party (CCP). In 1928, Deng Zihui began land reform experiments in Minxi. His efforts included a bottom-up method of policy development: leaders would consult with locals and adopt their practical suggestions while reserving broader policy questions and expansion for Communist Party evaluation. Some scholars view Deng (as opposed to Mao) as the first to experiment with land reform through the establishment of "model villages" and the dissemination of "model experiences". By 1930, the experiments with land reform in Minxi had been widely disseminated in Communist Party publications and became an important point of reference for the Jiangxi Soviet's land policies from 1931 to 1934.

Deng organised many guerrilla strikes in his home province of Fujian. He was put in charge of finance in the Ruijin soviet government of 1931–1933. After the outbreak of the Second Sino-Japanese War, in 1938, he became a major military leader of the newly created New Fourth Army. During the course of the wars Deng participated in, he became a close associate of Mao Zedong, and he belonged in the small circle of Mao's faithful comrades.

=== State career ===
==== Early career ====
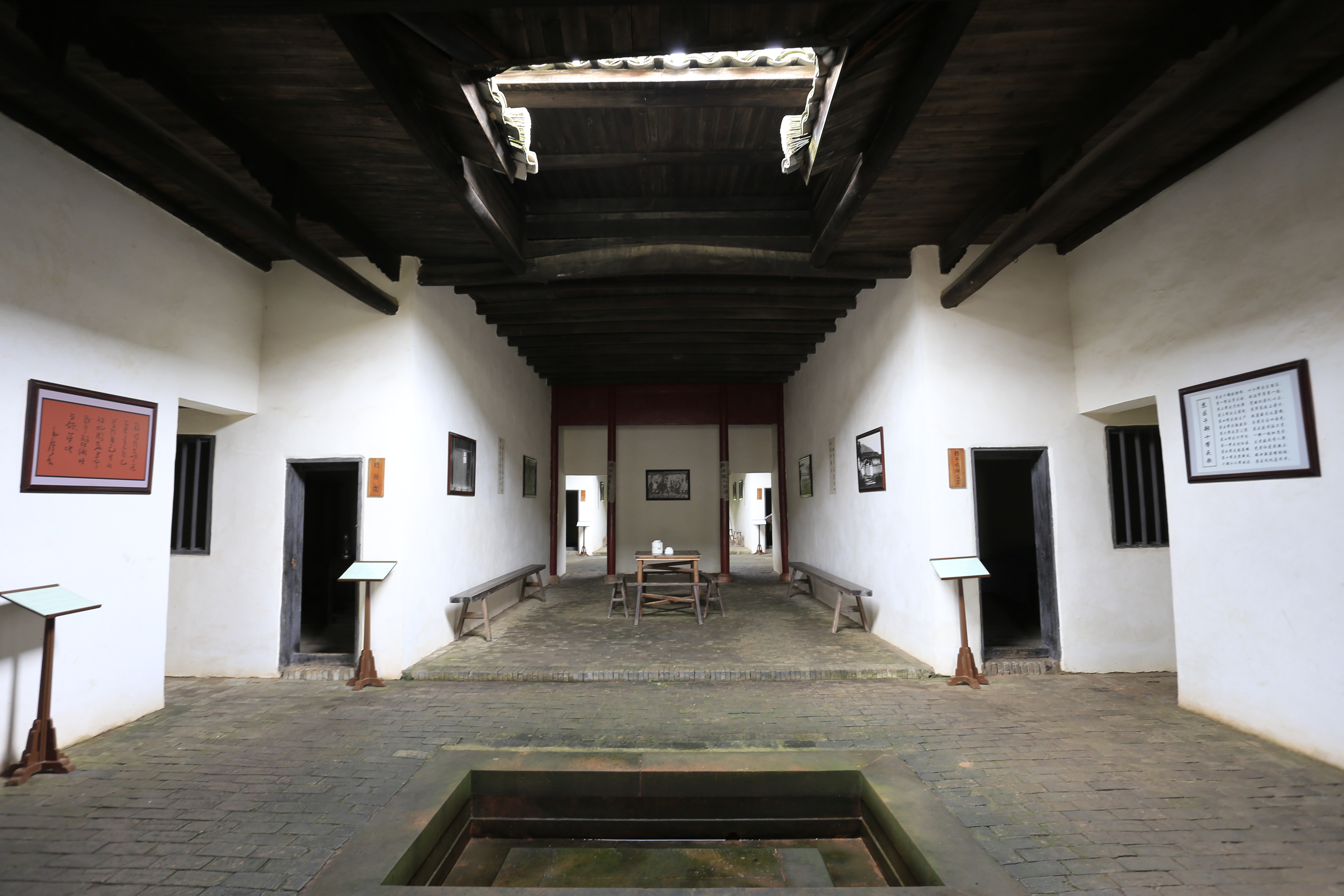
The former site of the People's Finance Committee of the Jiangxi–Fujian Soviet in Ruijin, which Deng was in charge of.

After the founding of the People's Republic of China, Deng suffered from hepatitis and diabetes, but he continued to work. He dominated both the party's and the state's policies throughout the period 1953–1962 and he often came into conflict with Mao Zedong over agricultural issues. Following his appointment to head the party's new Rural Work Department in early 1953, Deng became the Vice Premier of China in 1954, overseeing agriculture, forestry, fisheries, hydraulics, trade and finance in the rural sector. During the initial phases of agricultural collectivization, he supported proposals for the redistribution of land to poor peasants from wealthier peasants and landlords. However, during the mid-1950s he reverted to his early support for moderate policies. Deng became a strong defender of peasant property rights and began opposing the policy of forced agricultural collectivization pursued by Mao, especially after the Great Leap Forward. He relied on extensive investigations into the rural economy to support the legal protection of peasant property rights while advocating against policies involving extreme egalitarianism, opposing excessive government grain requisitions, the state monopoly on agricultural pricing and the frequent and rapid transfer of property ownership. Deng's proposals inaugurated major agricultural reforms such as the 'household contract system' (包产到户, baochan daohu), which concerned the country's food crisis. The system was supported by the chief members of the politburo, such as Tian Jiaying, Chen Yun and Deng Xiaoping, but when it was proposed to Mao, he refused to consider it because he believed it pointed in the direction of capitalism.

==== Late career and conflict with Mao Zedong ====
During the Central Committee Work Conference at Beidaihe (6 August 1962 – 24 August 1962) the agricultural questioned was placed first. After Mao Zedong's speech on a general leaders' meeting in 6 August, the themes of class struggle, criticism of the 'winds of individual farming' (单干风, danganfeng) and 'winds of darkness' (黑暗风, hei'anfang) dominated discussions in meetings held by regional groups. Mao used a central structure (中心小组, zhongxin xiaozu), comprising members of the politburo and a number of regional leaders, to centralize topics of discussion and channel the opinions expressed. Deng now felt that he was being directly targeted and, on 10 August, he tried to defend himself against attacks by Li Jingquan, Chen Boda and Ke Qingshi. He reminded to them that the 'responsibility system for contracting work and output' (包产责任制, baochan zerenzhi) had been ratified by the CCP as early as 1957. This policy had been undermined after 1958, but its resumption would improve collective farming. Deng stated that the 'farming responsibility system' (责任田, zerentian) could not be considered a form of individual farming. However, on the following day, Mao defamed Deng, by describing him as an individual 'devoid of any intellectual predisposition in favour of the socialist revolution'. Later on, Mao's attacks took the form of comments that he implanted into speeches by other leaders. He also distributed an old document from the Rural Work Department in order to stigmatise Deng's change of position. Additionally, in one harsh handwritten note, Mao recalled some supposed 'serious and historic errors' committed by Deng at the beginning of the 1950s. Shortly after, the Rural Work Department which Deng was in charge of, was accused by Mao of 'having done nothing useful for the past ten years' and dissolved.

=== Death and legacy ===
Deng was persecuted by Lin Biao and Jiang Qing and purged from all positions during the Cultural Revolution (1966–1976). Beset with illness and bereft of official protection, Deng died from an accident on 10 December 1972 in Beijing. He was posthumously rehabilitated and his reputation was restored. Because of his efforts to resist hasty collectivization and his pioneering advocacy of the responsibility system, Deng became a 'hero before his time' in recent historical reconstructions. In 1987, the 'Deng Zihui Memorial Hall' was built in Dongxiao. A statue of Deng was placed in the middle of the hall. A biography of him was written in 1996.

== Family ==
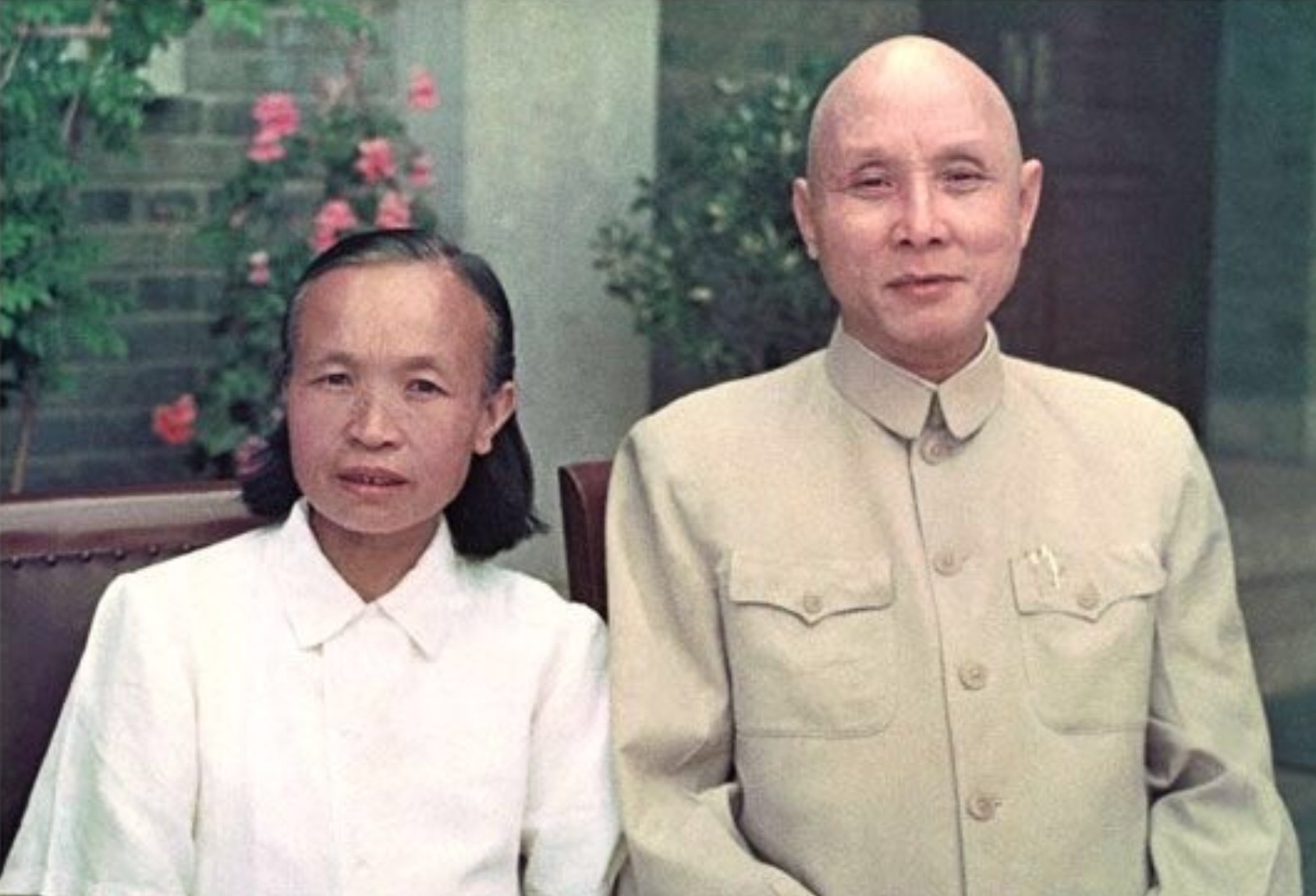
Deng Zihui with his final wife, Chen Lan (1959)

Deng Zihui was born into a prosperous family and he was the second eldest out of eight children. His father was a businessman working in Ganzhou, while his mother was doing the housework. Deng's mother died from an illness when he was only thirteen years old. In the first month of 1915, Deng fell in love with his future wife, Cao Quangdi (June 1899 – November 1954). Later, during the same year, he proposed to her and on the tenth day of the first lunar month of 1916, he married her. Deng taught her how to read and write, while explaining revolutionary concepts to her, which she slowly accepted. Soon, Cao gave birth to their eldest son, Deng Yisheng. In April 1928, Deng Zihui was labeled a criminal by the nationalist Kuomintang government and as a family member, his wife was also wanted along with him. Cao, who was pregnant at the time, was forced to hide in Tibet where she gave birth to the couple's daughter, Deng Fangmei. During the Dragon Boat Festival, she secretly returned to China with his son and daughter, however she was caught by the local security chief and was arrested along with her parents. The Kuomintang pressured Cao to reveal her husband's whereabouts, however she refused. She was imprisoned for two months and then she was let go under surveillance. In the autumn of 1934, the Jiangxi–Fujian Soviet was in a state of emergency and the Chinese Red Army was coming close to the historic Long March. Deng Zihui was forced to divorce her, in order to not cause trouble for her and to protect her and the rest of his family against reprisals from the Kuomintang. In 1954, Cao suffered from uterine cancer and died. Deng met and married his second wife, Huang Xiuxiang, in late 1934. Huang, was a native of Fujian and she lived very close to Deng Zihui's home. They had two children together (Deng Xiaolan and Deng Ruisheng). Three days after the birth of their eldest child, Deng Huaisheng, they were forced to send him to a farmer's home in Huichang along with the son of Lin Boqu, due to the consequences of the civil war. Later on, Huang was wounded, captured and executed during the breakout of the Long March. In 1936, during the Chinese New Year, Deng remarried; this time with a woman named Chen Lan. Chen was born in 1913 but due to family poverty, she was sold to a mason's family as a child bride when she was only six years old. She joined the communist guerillas under the command of Deng Zihui after the Kuomintang killed her family in late 1934 where she served as a mimeographer, intelligence agent, needlewoman, sentry and cook. The couple had seven children together (incl. Deng Husheng and Deng Hansheng). Chen died in Beijing, in 2005, at the age of 92.
