= Longyan dialect =

Dialect of Hokkien

Longyan
- 龙岩话 / 龍巖話; Lóngyánhuà / Liong^{11}lã^{11}guɛ^{334}
- Native to: China
- Region: Fujian Province
- Native speakers: much less than the 840,000 residents of Xinluo District (2021)
- Language family: Sino-Tibetan: Sinitic; Chinese; Min; Coastal Min; Southern Min; Hokkien; Longyan
- Early forms: Proto-Sino-Tibetan: Old Chinese (Note: Min is believed to have split from Old Chinese, rather than Middle Chinese like other varieties of Chinese.); Proto-Min

Language codes
- ISO 639-3: None (mis)
- Glottolog: zhan1240 Zhangping-Longyan
- Linguasphere: /-jej 79-AAA-jei /-jej
- Distribution of Min Nan dialects. Longyan Min is in yellow.

The Longyan dialect or Longyanese (Note: simplified Chinese: 龙岩话; traditional Chinese: 龍巖話; pinyin: Lóngyánhuà; Liongyanese: Liong^{11}lã^{11}guɛ^{334}) is a variety of Hokkien spoken in the urban city area of Eastern Longyan in Fujian Province, while Hakka is spoken in rural villages of Western Longyan. The Longyan Min people had settled in the region from Southern Fujian as early as the Tang dynasty (618–907). Due to its close proximity to rural Hakka villages, Longyan Min has some influence from Hakka albeit to a limited extent. The Longyan dialect has a limited degree of intelligibility with other Southern Min varieties. Today, Longyanese is predominantly spoken in Longyan's urban district Xinluo District while Zhangzhou Minnan is spoken in Zhangping City excluding Chishui and Shuangyang towns where Longyan Minnan is spoken. Hakka on the other hand is spoken in the non-urban rest of the rural areas of Longyan prefecture: Changting County, Liancheng County, Shanghang County, Wuping County, and Yongding District.

Branner suggests that the Xinluo and Zhangping dialects should be grouped with the Datian dialect as a coastal Min group separate from both Southern Min and Eastern Min. However, he argues that the dialect of Wan'an township, in the northern part of Xinluo district, is a coastal Min variety separate from all of these.

== Phonology ==
The Longyan dialect has 14 initials, 65 rimes, and 8 tones.

=== Initials ===
p, pʰ, m, b, t, tʰ, n, l, ts, tsʰ, s, k, kʰ, ŋ, h.

=== Rimes ===
l, i, u, iu, ui

a, ia, ua, iua, o, io, ei, ie

ue, ɛ, iɛ, uɛ, ai, uai, au, iau

m, im, am, iam, iep, ap, iap

in, un, an, ian, uan

it, at, iat, uat, uot, ŋ

aŋ, iaŋ, uaŋ, oŋ, ioŋ, ak, iak, uak, ok, iok

ĩ, ũ, ũi, ã, iã, uã, iuã, iãt, õ, iõ, ɛ̃, iɛ̃, uɛ̃, ãi, ãu, iãu.

=== Tones ===
No.	1	2	3	4	5	6	7	8
Tones	dark level 陰平	light level 陽平	dark rising 陰上	light rising 陽上	dark departing 陰去	light departing 陽去	dark entering 陰入	light entering 陽入
Tone contour	˧˧˦ (334)	˩ (11)	˨˩ (21)	˥˨ (52)	˨˩˧ (213)	˥ (55)	˥ (5)	˧˨ (32)
Example Hanzi	邊	寒	碗	近	漢	尺	曲	白

=== Tone sandhi ===
The Longyan dialect has extremely extensive tone sandhi rules: in an utterance, only the last syllable pronounced is not affected by the rules.

The two-syllable tonal sandhi rules are shown in the table below (the rows give the first syllable's original citation tone, while the columns give the citation tone of the second syllable):

	dark level, 334	light level, 11	dark rising, 21	light rising, 52	dark departing, 213	light departing, 55	dark entering, 5	light entering, 32
dark level, 334	remain unchanged							
light level, 11	remain unchanged							
dark rising, 21	remain unchanged	dark departing, 213		remain unchanged				
light rising, 52	light level, 11							
dark departing, 213	dark rising, 21	remain unchanged		dark rising, 21				
light departing, 55	dark level, 334	remain unchanged		dark level, 334				
dark entering, 5	dark level, 334	remain unchanged		dark level, 334				
light entering, 32	dark rising, 21							
