= Pucheng =

Pucheng is an atonal pinyin romanization of various Chinese names and words.

Pucheng may refer to:

- Pucheng County (浦城县) in Fujian
- Pucheng County (蒲城县) in Shaanxi
- Pucheng Subdistrict (蒲城街道), formerly Pucheng Township (蒲城乡) and Putai County (蒲台縣), now an area of Binzhou, Shandong
