= Dachi, Fujian =

Dachi 大池镇
- Town
- Location in Fujian Dachi (China)
- Coordinates: 25°07′36″N 116°47′53″E
- Country: China
- Province: Fujian
- Prefecture-level city: Longyan
- District: Xinluo District
- Village-level divisions: 13 villages
- Elevation: 499 m (1,637 ft)
- Time zone: UTC+8 (China Standard)
- Area code: 0597

Dachi (Chinese: 大池; pinyin: Dàchí) is a town in Xinluo District, Longyan, Fujian, China, located about 23 kilometres (14 mi) from downtown Longyan along China National Highway 319. As of 2018, it has 13 villages under its administration. Yajin Village, Hongxie Village, Beixi Village, Jiuliyang Village, Dadong Village, Xiudong Village, Xiyang Village, Dashan Village, Nanyan Village, Huangmei Village, Dahe Village, Hejia Village, Zhuhe Village.

== Local Leadership ==
- Committee Member of the Xinluo District Committee and Minister of the United Front Work Department and Secretary of the Dachi Town Party Committee: Su Bilian
- Deputy Secretary of the Dachi Town Party Committee and Mayor: Zheng Jinhong
- Chairman of the People's Congress of Dachi Town: Yin Keqian
- Deputy Mayor of Dachi Town: Wu Juan
- Director of the Dachi Town Multi-Village Revitalization and Enterprise Development Service Center: Guo Yongsui
- Head of the Dachi Town Project Office: Yang Daquan
- Cadre of the Dachi Town Project Office: Wang Jingwen

== See also ==
- List of township-level divisions of Fujian
