= Longyan University =

University in Longyan, China

Coordinates: 25.032222°N 117.019522°E

- 龙岩学院
- Motto: 厚于德 敏于学
- Type: Public university
- Established: 1958
- President: Li Zeyu
- Students: 8,000
- Undergraduates: n/a
- Postgraduates: n/a
- Location: Longyan, Fujian, China
- Campus: 1024 km^{2}
- Website: www.lyun.edu.cn

Longyan University (Chinese: 龙岩学院; Pe̍h-ōe-jī: Liông-gâm-ha̍k-īⁿ) is one of the full-time public undergraduate universities of Fujian Province authorized by the Ministry of Education of the People's Republic of China, which is located in Longyan City.

The University occupies an area of 1058 mu, including Dongxiao campus and Fenghuang campus, with a total floor space of 230,000 square metres (2,500,000 ft^{2}). Its library stores over 1,000,000 books and periodicals in Chinese and other languages, serving as the largest centre of information in west Fujian.

== History ==
Founded in 1958, Longyan University was previously called Longyan Higher Normal College. It was merged with Fujian Resources Industrial School in 2001. The current name of Longyan University dates back to May 2004, authorised by the Chinese Ministry of Education. At present, it is the only full-time undergraduate university in the west of Fujian.

== Faculties and schools ==
There are 9 colleges and departments in the university covering 6 fields, namely, literature, science, engineering, agronomy, management and education. The university offers 27 four-year undergraduate programmes and 10 three-year college programmes to students of different educational backgrounds, including over 7500 full-time students and more than 5500 students of adult education.

- College of Humanities and Education
- College of Foreign Languages
- College of Economics and Management
- College of Mathematics and Computer Science
- College of Physics and Mechanical and Electrical Engineering
- College of Chemistry and Materials Science
- College of Resource Engineering
- College of Life Science
- Department of Physical Education
- Department of Art
- Teaching and Research Department of Ideological and Political Theory Courses
- School of Continuing Education

== Cooperation with other universities ==
- Ling Tung University (Taiwan)
- Saint Peter's College (U.S)
- Macau University of Science and Technology (Macau)

== See also ==
- List of universities in China
