= Wan'an, Wuping County =

Wan'an 万安镇
- Town
- Location in Fujian Wan'an (China)
- Coordinates: 25°7′56″N 116°5′33″E
- Country: People's Republic of China
- Province: Fujian
- Prefecture-level city: Longyan
- County: Wuping County
- Time zone: UTC+8 (China Standard)

Wan'an (simplified Chinese: 万安; traditional Chinese: 萬安; pinyin: Wàn'ān) is a town under the administration of Wuping County, Fujian, China. As of 2018, it has 6 villages under its administration.
