= Wan'an Prefecture =

Historical administrative division in Hainan, China

Wan'an Prefecture (萬安州): Wan'an Commandery (萬安郡); Wanquan Commandery (萬全郡); Wan'an Military Prefecture (萬安軍)
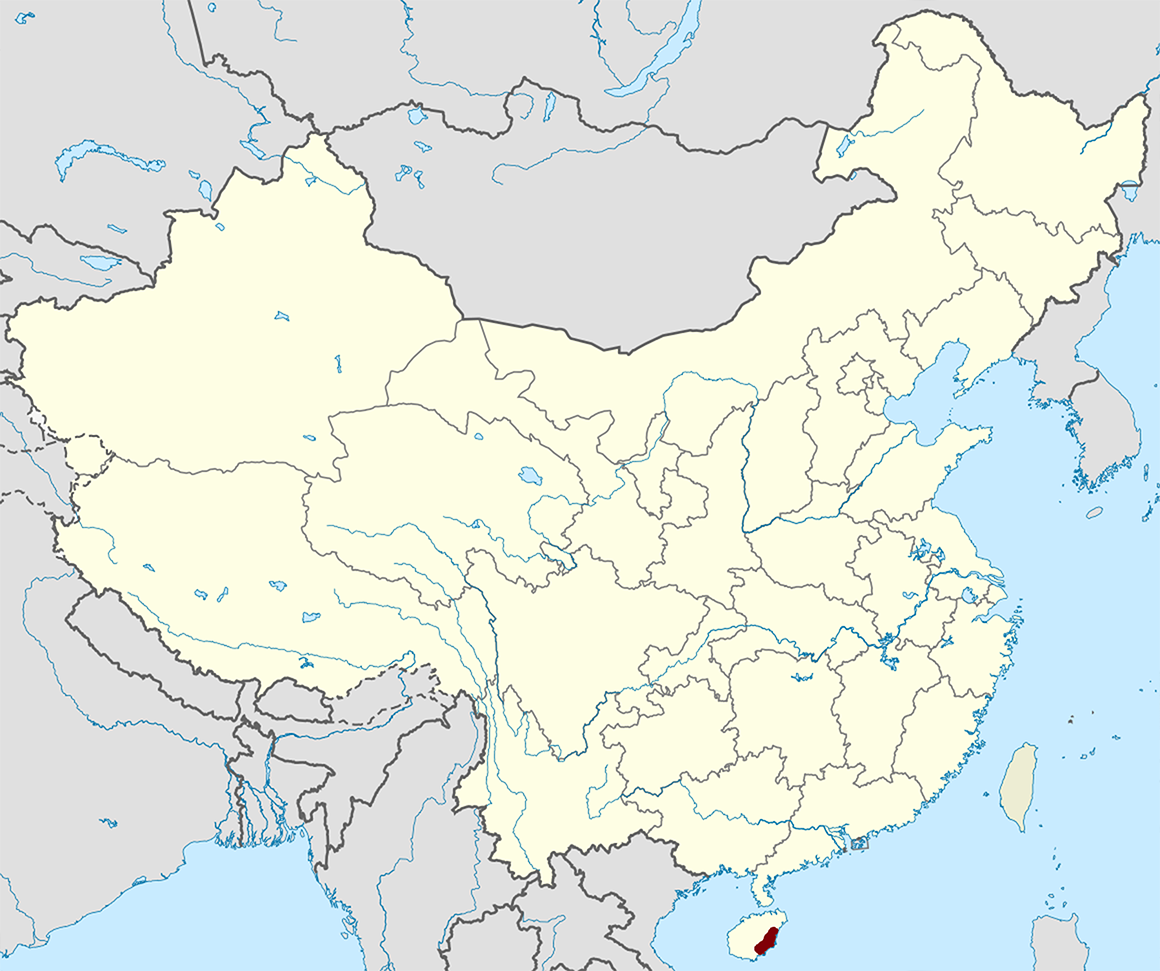
- Population
  - 740s or 750s: Unknown, 2,997 households
  - 1070s or 1080s: Unknown, 270 households
- History
  - Created: 662 (Tang dynasty)
  - Abolished: 1368 (Ming dynasty)
  - Succeeded by: Wan Prefecture (萬州)
- Contained within
  - Circuit: Tang dynasty: Lingnan Circuit; Song dynasty: Guangnan Circuit; Guangnan West Circuit

Wan'an Prefecture
- Traditional Chinese: 萬安州
- Simplified Chinese: 万安州
Transcriptions
Standard Mandarin
- Hanyu Pinyin: Wàn'ān Zhōu

Wan'an Military Prefecture
- Traditional Chinese: 萬安軍
- Simplified Chinese: 万安军
Transcriptions
Standard Mandarin
- Hanyu Pinyin: Wàn'ān Jūn

Wan'an Commandery
- Traditional Chinese: 萬安郡
- Simplified Chinese: 万安郡
Transcriptions
Standard Mandarin
- Hanyu Pinyin: Wàn'ān Jùn

Wanquan Commandery
- Traditional Chinese: 萬全軍
- Simplified Chinese: 万全军
Transcriptions
Standard Mandarin
- Hanyu Pinyin: Wànquán Jùn

Wan'an Zhou or Wan'an Prefecture was a zhou (prefecture) in imperial China in modern southeastern Hainan, China. It existed from 662 to 1368, but between 742 and 757 it was known as Wan'an Commandery, and between 757 and 758 as Wanquan Commandery. The Song dynasty made it a military prefecture in 1074.

== Counties ==
Wan'an Prefecture administered the following counties (縣) through history:

- Wan'an (萬安), roughly modern northern Wanning. During Southern Han and Northern Song dynasty it was known as Wanning (萬寧), but after 1136 its name was changed back to Wan'an.
- Lingshui (陵水), roughly modern Lingshui Li Autonomous County. Between 1074 and 1080 it was part of Wan'an County.
- Fuyun (富雲), roughly modern western Wanning.
- Boliao (博遼), roughly modern southern Wanning.

Both Fuyun and Boliao were abolished at the end of the Tang dynasty.
