= Pucheng County, Fujian =

Pucheng County 浦城县
- County

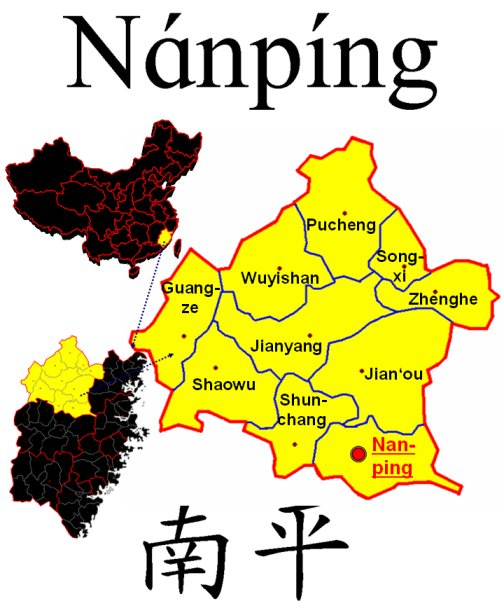
- Location of Pucheng County within Nanping City

- Location of the seat in Fujian
- Coordinates: 27°54′N 118°31′E
- Country: People's Republic of China
- Province: Fujian
- Prefecture-level city: Nanping

Government
  - CPC County Committee Secretary: Zhou Yonghe

Area
  - Total: 3,383 km^{2} (1,306 sq mi)
  - Water: 100 km^{2} (39 sq mi)

Population (2020 census)
  - Total: 297,719
  - Density: 88.00/km^{2} (227.9/sq mi)
- Time zone: UTC+8 (China Standard)
- Postal code: 353400
- Website: www.pc.gov.cn

Pucheng County (simplified Chinese: 浦城县; traditional Chinese: 浦城縣; pinyin: Pǔchéng Xiàn) is a county under the jurisdiction of the municipality of Nanping, in northern Fujian province, People's Republic of China, bordering Jiangxi to the northwest and Zhejiang to the east; it is the northernmost county-level division of Fujian.

The county is named for the Nanpu Brook, a major tributary to the Min River.

== Geography ==
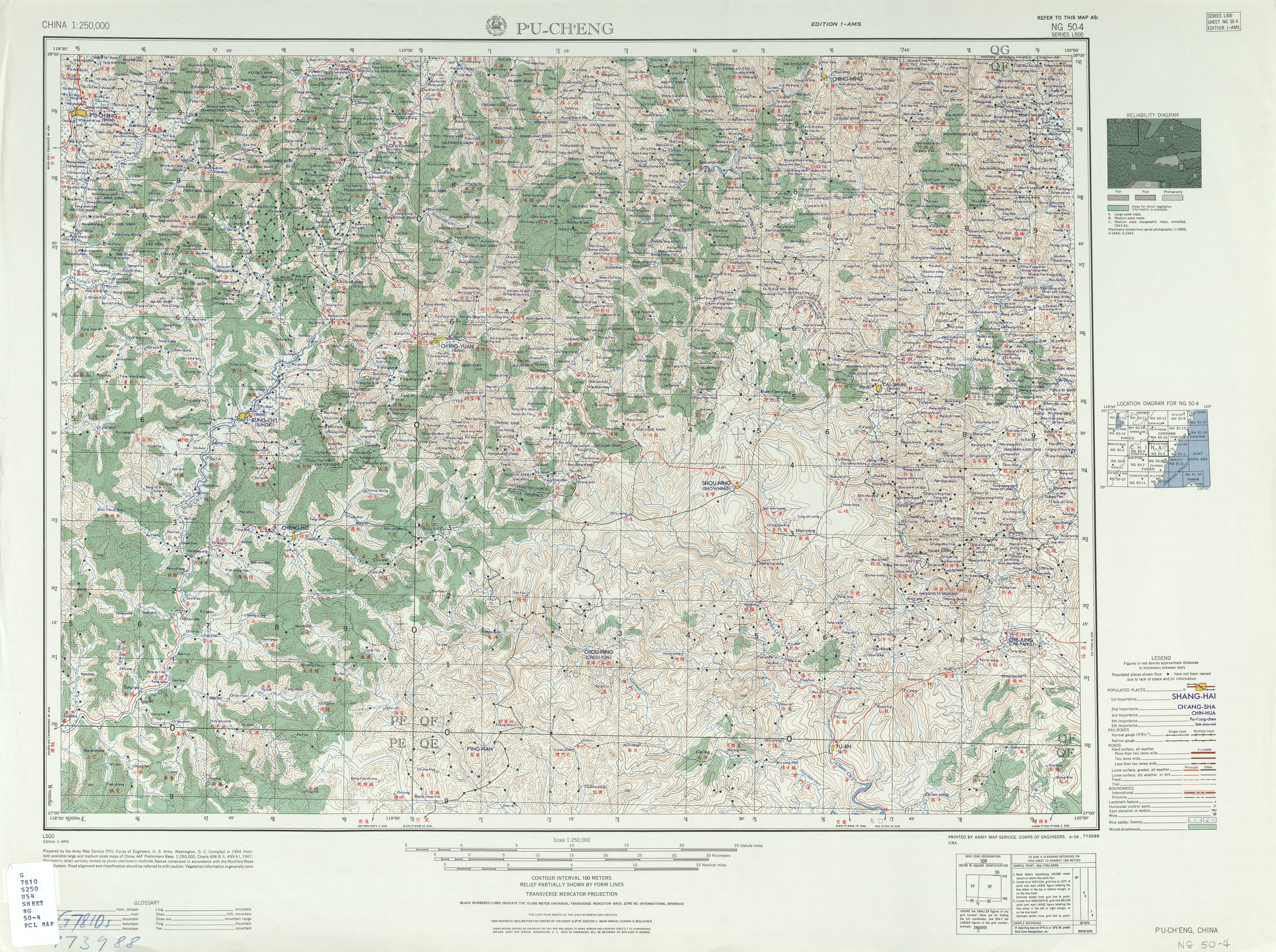
Pucheng (labeled as P'U-CH'ENG 浦城) (1954)

Pucheng comprises 3,383.02 square kilometres (1,306.19 sq mi) in the Wuyi Mountains which separates Fujian and Jiangxi provinces. It borders Songxi County to the southeast, Jianyang District to the south and Wuyishan City (location of the famous UNESCO park) to the west, all within Nanping. The municipality of Shangrao, Jiangxi, borders to the northwest; those of Quzhou, to the north, and Lishui, to the east, are in Zhejiang.

== Climate ==
Climate data for Pucheng, elevation 277 m (909 ft), (1991–2020 normals, extremes 1981–2010)
Month	Jan	Feb	Mar	Apr	May	Jun	Jul	Aug	Sep	Oct	Nov	Dec	Year
Record high °C (°F)	27.8 (82.0)	30.0 (86.0)	33.0 (91.4)	34.1 (93.4)	35.5 (95.9)	36.2 (97.2)	42.0 (107.6)	41.1 (106.0)	39.3 (102.7)	37.3 (99.1)	33.0 (91.4)	26.0 (78.8)	42.0 (107.6)
Mean daily maximum °C (°F)	12.3 (54.1)	14.8 (58.6)	18.1 (64.6)	23.8 (74.8)	27.6 (81.7)	29.8 (85.6)	33.7 (92.7)	33.6 (92.5)	30.5 (86.9)	26.1 (79.0)	20.5 (68.9)	14.8 (58.6)	23.8 (74.8)
Daily mean °C (°F)	6.9 (44.4)	9.2 (48.6)	12.6 (54.7)	18.0 (64.4)	22.1 (71.8)	24.9 (76.8)	27.7 (81.9)	27.3 (81.1)	24.3 (75.7)	19.5 (67.1)	14.0 (57.2)	8.6 (47.5)	17.9 (64.3)
Mean daily minimum °C (°F)	3.4 (38.1)	5.5 (41.9)	8.8 (47.8)	13.9 (57.0)	18.2 (64.8)	21.6 (70.9)	23.5 (74.3)	23.3 (73.9)	20.2 (68.4)	15.0 (59.0)	9.8 (49.6)	4.5 (40.1)	14.0 (57.2)
Record low °C (°F)	−6.6 (20.1)	−5.0 (23.0)	−4.5 (23.9)	2.4 (36.3)	8.7 (47.7)	12.6 (54.7)	18.9 (66.0)	16.5 (61.7)	11.3 (52.3)	2.3 (36.1)	−2.9 (26.8)	−7.6 (18.3)	−7.6 (18.3)
Average precipitation mm (inches)	77.1 (3.04)	97.0 (3.82)	201.3 (7.93)	213.8 (8.42)	252.3 (9.93)	403.5 (15.89)	154.8 (6.09)	134.4 (5.29)	84.5 (3.33)	46.7 (1.84)	76.1 (3.00)	60.9 (2.40)	1,802.4 (70.98)
Average precipitation days (≥ 0.1 mm)	12.7	13.2	18.7	17.0	17.0	19.5	13.6	14.7	10.4	7.0	9.6	9.6	163
Average snowy days	2.0	1.1	0.2	0	0	0	0	0	0	0	0	0.6	3.9
Average relative humidity (%)	79	79	81	79	80	83	78	79	78	76	79	78	79
Mean monthly sunshine hours	98.5	93.8	98.2	124.0	135.9	127.1	224.4	209.8	178.8	173.0	133.1	127.9	1,724.5
Percentage possible sunshine	30	30	26	32	32	31	53	52	49	49	42	40	39
Source: China Meteorological Administration

== Culture ==
=== Language ===
The Pucheng dialect shares some features with Wu, but is classed among the Southern Chinese varieties. It is however not demonstrably a member of the Min subgroup (which covers almost all of Fujian), and pending further research must stand as an isolate - the sole exemplar of the Pucheng group of Southern Chinese. Some Wu dialects and the Northern Min dialect of Shibei are also spoken in Pucheng.

=== Intangible Cultural Heritage ===
- Pucheng-style Papercutting (浦城剪纸)
- Min-school Guqin (闽派古琴)

== Administrative divisions ==
The county administers 2 street offices, 9 towns and 8 townships. The county executive, legislature and judiciary are in Nanpu Street Office, together with the CPC and PSB branches.

=== Subdistricts (街道, jiedao) ===
- Nanpu (南浦) - the county seat
- Hebin (河滨)

=== Towns (镇, zhen) ===
- Fuling (富岭)
- Shibei (石陂)
- Linjiang (临江)
- Xianyang (仙阳)
- Shuibeijie (水北街)
- Yongxing (永兴)
- Zhongxin (忠信)
- Liantang (莲塘)
- Jiumu (九牧)

=== Townships (乡, xiang) ===
- Wan'an (万安)
- Gulou (古楼)
- Shanxia (山下)
- Fengxi (枫溪)
- Haocun (濠村)
- Guancuo (管厝)
- Panting (盘亭)
- Guanlu (官路)

== Transportation ==
=== Expressway ===
- S03_{11} Pucheng-Jianning Expressway

== Specialty ==
- Pucheng Rouyan/Taipingyan (浦城肉燕/太平燕)
- Tofu ball (豆腐丸)
- Osmanthus tea (桂花茶)
- Wild jujube cake (酸枣糕)
- Baojiu (包酒/七倒金)

== Archaeology ==
In 2006 mound tombs of the Wuyue Kingdom were discovered in Guanjiu village. (The kingdom was contemporary with the Spring and Autumn period and Warring States period of the Yellow River-centred Hans). Considered a strongly significant element of Wuyue culture, these are the first such tombs discovered in Fujian Province. 72 bronze funerary articles were excavated from the tombs, making the excavation the largest harvest of bronze items in Fujian archaeological history.

== Notable persons ==
- Ye Jianming, founder and former chairman of CEFC China Energy Company Limited

== See also ==
- List of administrative divisions of Fujian
