= Wuping County =

Wuping County 武平县
- County
- Location in Fujian
- Coordinates: 25°05′43″N 116°06′01″E
- Country: People's Republic of China
- Province: Fujian
- Prefecture-level city: Longyan

Area
  - Total: 2,637 km^{2} (1,018 sq mi)

Population (2020)
  - Total: 278,238
  - Density: 105.5/km^{2} (273.3/sq mi)
- Time zone: UTC+8 (China Standard)

Wuping (Chinese: 武平; pinyin: Wǔpíng; Hakka: Vú-phìn) is a county in of southwestern Fujian province, People's Republic of China, bordering Meizhou, Guangdong to the south and Ganzhou, Jiangxi to the west. It is under the administration of Longyan City.

== Administration ==
The county executive, legislature and judiciary are in the town of Pingchuan (平川), together with the CPC and PSB branches.

=== Towns (镇, zhen) ===
- Taoxi (桃溪)
- Zhongbao (中堡)
- Shifang (十方)
- Zhongshan (中山)
- Yanqian (岩前)

=== Townships (乡, xiang) ===
- Xiangdian (湘店)
- Dahe (大禾)
- Yongping (永平)
- Dongliu (东留)
- Wan'an (万安)
- Wudong (武东)
- Chengxiang (城厢)
- Minzhu (民主)
- Xiaba (下坝)
- Zhongchi (中赤)
- Xiangdong (象洞)

== Climate ==
Climate data for Wuping, elevation 307 m (1,007 ft), (1991–2020 normals, extremes 1981–2010)
Month	Jan	Feb	Mar	Apr	May	Jun	Jul	Aug	Sep	Oct	Nov	Dec	Year
Record high °C (°F)	27.8 (82.0)	30.0 (86.0)	31.1 (88.0)	33.9 (93.0)	35.2 (95.4)	36.3 (97.3)	38.2 (100.8)	37.9 (100.2)	37.2 (99.0)	35.6 (96.1)	33.3 (91.9)	29.0 (84.2)	38.2 (100.8)
Mean daily maximum °C (°F)	15.8 (60.4)	18.3 (64.9)	20.7 (69.3)	24.8 (76.6)	28.5 (83.3)	30.9 (87.6)	33.2 (91.8)	33.1 (91.6)	31.4 (88.5)	27.6 (81.7)	22.8 (73.0)	17.7 (63.9)	25.4 (77.7)
Daily mean °C (°F)	10.3 (50.5)	12.8 (55.0)	15.7 (60.3)	19.8 (67.6)	23.7 (74.7)	26.1 (79.0)	27.7 (81.9)	27.4 (81.3)	26.0 (78.8)	22.2 (72.0)	17.2 (63.0)	11.8 (53.2)	20.1 (68.1)
Mean daily minimum °C (°F)	6.8 (44.2)	9.3 (48.7)	12.3 (54.1)	16.3 (61.3)	20.5 (68.9)	23.2 (73.8)	24.0 (75.2)	23.8 (74.8)	22.4 (72.3)	18.2 (64.8)	13.4 (56.1)	7.9 (46.2)	16.5 (61.7)
Record low °C (°F)	−4.7 (23.5)	−2.3 (27.9)	−2.9 (26.8)	5.8 (42.4)	10.6 (51.1)	13.5 (56.3)	19.2 (66.6)	17.9 (64.2)	11.3 (52.3)	5.5 (41.9)	−1.6 (29.1)	−5.2 (22.6)	−5.2 (22.6)
Average precipitation mm (inches)	60.5 (2.38)	87.4 (3.44)	167.7 (6.60)	193.0 (7.60)	261.6 (10.30)	306.8 (12.08)	168.6 (6.64)	207.4 (8.17)	109.5 (4.31)	46.2 (1.82)	48.4 (1.91)	44.5 (1.75)	1,701.6 (67)
Average precipitation days (≥ 0.1 mm)	9.0	11.8	16.9	16.8	18.5	19.1	14.9	16.7	10.8	5.4	6.6	6.8	153.3
Average snowy days	0.3	0	0	0	0	0	0	0	0	0	0	0.1	0.4
Average relative humidity (%)	74	77	81	81	82	84	80	81	77	71	72	71	78
Mean monthly sunshine hours	119.9	94.8	86.3	97.8	117.9	130.1	206.9	192.7	180.5	184.4	163.2	151.3	1,725.8
Percentage possible sunshine	36	29	23	26	28	32	50	48	49	52	50	46	39
Source: China Meteorological Administration
