= Wan'an, Santai County =

Wan'an 万安镇
- Town
- Location in Sichuan
- Coordinates: 31°1′11″N 104°56′16″E
- Country: People's Republic of China
- Province: Sichuan
- Prefecture-level city: Yuncheng
- County: Santai County
- Time zone: UTC+8 (China Standard)

Wan'an (simplified Chinese: 万安; traditional Chinese: 萬安; pinyin: Wàn'ān) is a town under the administration of Santai County, Sichuan, China. As of 2018, it has one residential community and six villages under its administration.
