= Wan'an, Xinluo District =

Wan'an 万安镇
- Town
- Location in Fujian Wan'an (China)
- Coordinates: 25°24′37″N 117°3′34″E
- Country: China
- Province: Fujian
- Prefecture-level city: Longyan
- District: Xinluo District
- Time zone: UTC+8 (China Standard)

Wan'an (simplified Chinese: 万安; traditional Chinese: 萬安; pinyin: Wàn'ān) is a town under the administration of Xinluo District, Longyan, Fujian, China. As of 2018, it has 20 villages under its administration.

== See also ==
- List of township-level divisions of Fujian
