= Wan'an Bridge =

Wan'an Bridge (simplified Chinese: 万安桥; traditional Chinese: 萬安橋; pinyin: Wàn'ān Qiáo) may refer to the following bridges in China:

- Wan'an Bridge (Pingnan), a wooden arch bridge in Pingnan County, Ningde, Fujian Province
- Luoyang Bridge, also known as Wan'an Bridge, in Quanzhou, Fujian Province
- Wan'an Bridge (Shanghai), a stone arch bridge in Jinze, Qingpu District, Shanghai
