= Wan'an station =

Wan'an station may refer to:

- Wan'an station (Beijing Subway), in Beijing, China
- Wan'an station (Chengdu Metro), in Chengdu, Sichuan Province, China
