= Septwolves (tobacco) =

Chinese tobacco brand

Septwolves is a tobacco brand based in Fujian, People's Republic of China.

The tobacco brand, created in 1995, is promoted by the Longyan Cigarette Factory under the auspices of the Jinjiang Tobacco Monopoly Bureau, and is used nationwide for cigarettes. Both the corporation and the government department were in fact under the same entity China Tobacco (which shared the same headquarter with State Tobacco Monopoly Administration) as their subsidiary. The Irish journalist Mark Godfrey called it "one of the biggest cigarette makers in the country".
