= Wan'an Township, Fujian =

Wan'an Township 万安乡
- Township
- Location in Fujian
- Coordinates: 27°55′2″N 118°33′3″E
- Country: People's Republic of China
- Province: Fujian
- Prefecture-level city: Nanping
- County: Pucheng County
- Time zone: UTC+8 (China Standard)

Wan'an Township (simplified Chinese: 万安乡; traditional Chinese: 萬安鄉; pinyin: Wàn'ān Xiāng) is a township under the administration of Pucheng County, Fujian, China. As of 2018, it has 10 villages under its administration.

== See also ==
- List of township-level divisions of Fujian
