= Wan'an Township, Sichuan =

Wan'an Township 万安乡
- Township
- Location in Sichuan
- Coordinates: 31°40′51″N 106°35′46″E
- Country: People's Republic of China
- Province: Sichuan
- Prefecture-level city: Bazhong
- District: Enyang District
- Time zone: UTC+8 (China Standard)

Wan'an Township (simplified Chinese: 万安乡; traditional Chinese: 萬安鄉; pinyin: Wàn'ān Xiāng) is a township under the administration of Enyang District, Bazhong, Sichuan, China. As of 2018, it has one residential community and 10 villages under its administration.

== See also ==
- List of township-level divisions of Sichuan
