= Xinluo, Longyan =

District of Longyan, Fujian Province, China

Xinluo 新罗区
- District
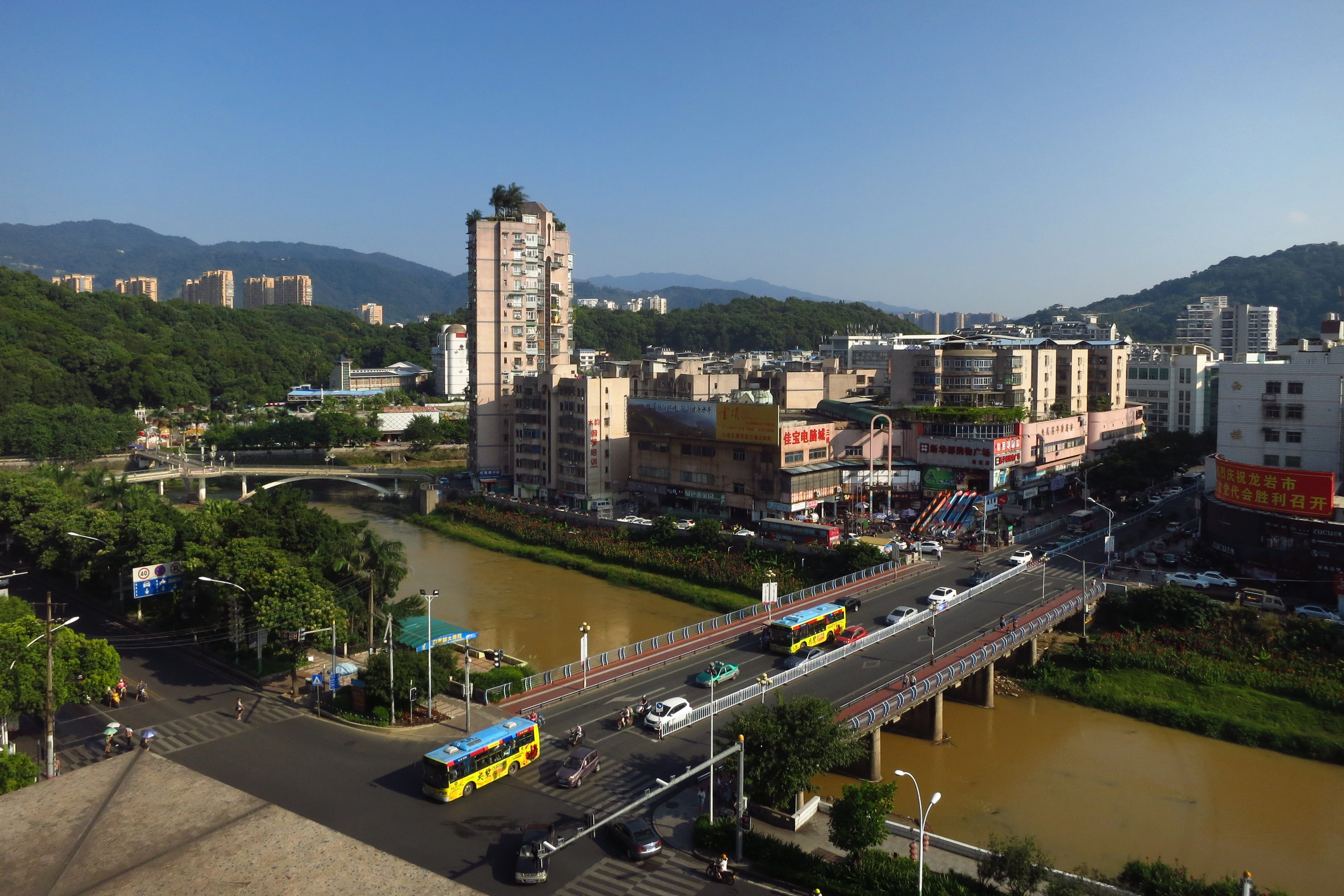

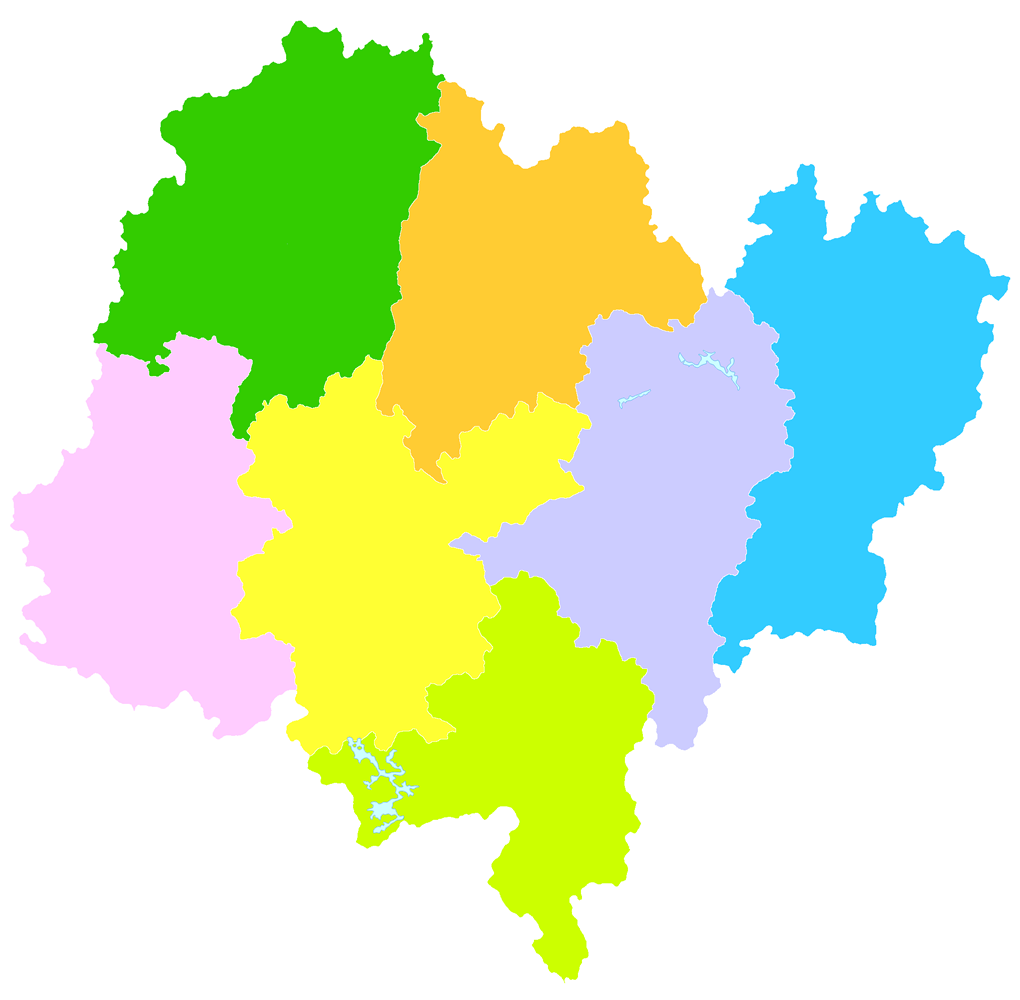
- Xinluo in Longyan

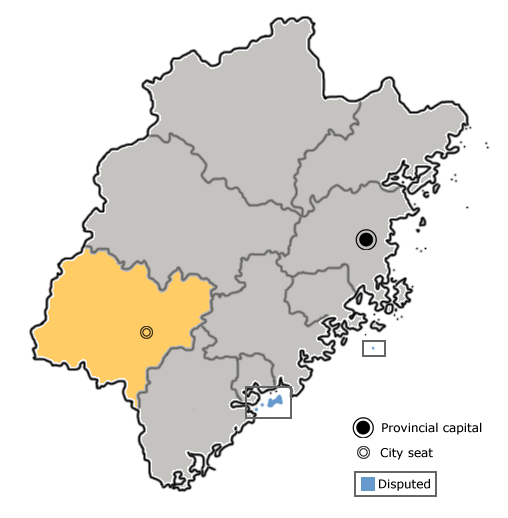
- Longyan in Fujian
- Coordinates: 25°13′13″N 117°06′35″E
- Country: China
- Province: Fujian
- Prefecture-level city: Longyan

Area
  - District: 2,678 km^{2} (1,034 sq mi)
  - Urban: 60 km^{2} (23 sq mi)

Population
  - District: 842,000
  - Density: 314/km^{2} (814/sq mi)
  - Urban: 490,000
  - Urban density: 8,200/km^{2} (21,000/sq mi)
- Time zone: UTC+08:00 (China Standard)
- Postal code: 364000
- Area code: 597
- Website: FJXinluo.gov.cn

Xinluo District (simplified Chinese: 新罗区; traditional Chinese: 新羅區; pinyin: Xīnluó Qū; Hakka: Sîn-lò-khî) is a district of Longyan, Fujian Province, China, with a population of approximately 842,000.

It was formerly named Longyan County (龙岩县).

As Xinluo is a part of the Minnan Hokkien territory, the Longyan dialect is spoken widely by the native Hokkien locals in the district, but Mandarin is the primary language for education and business.

== Administrative divisions ==
=== Subdistricts ===
Xinluo District has ten subdistricts:

- Beicheng Subdistrict (北城街道)
- Caoxi Subdistrict (曹溪街道)
- Dongcheng Subdistrict (东城街道) – Seat of the Xinluo District People's Government
- Dongxiao Subdistrict (东肖街道)
- Longmen Subdistrict (龙门街道)
- Nancheng Subdistrict (南城街道)
- Tieshan Subdistrict (铁山街道)
- Xicheng Subdistrict (西城街道)
- Xipi Subdistrict (西陂街道) – Seat of the Longyan City People's Government
- Zhongcheng Subdistrict (中城街道)

=== Towns ===
Xinluo District has ten towns:

- Baisha (白沙镇)
- Dachi (大池镇)
- Hongfang (红坊镇)
- Jiangshan (江山镇)
- Shizhong (适中镇)
- Suban (苏坂镇)
- Wan'an (万安镇)
- Xiaochi (小池镇)
- Yanshan (岩山镇)
- Yanshi (雁石镇)

==== List of villages ====
- Baisha has jurisdiction over 31 administrative villages:

Baisha, Banding, Chankeng, Chendi, Dake, Dayu, Dutou, Gaoyang, Guanyang, Guoshe, Huangban, Kongdang, Lufeng, Luoping, Luoshe, Luyang, Nanzhuo, Neicun, Suyitian, Tiankeng, Xiaoji, Xiaoxi, Yangxi, Yanxia, Yingbian, Yingdou, Yingqi, Yingtou, Zhangkeng, Zhenkeng, and Zoushan.

- Dachi has jurisdiction over 13 administrative villages:

Beixi, Dadong, Dahe, Dashan, Hejia, Hongxie, Huangmei, Jiuliyang, Nanyan, Xiudong, Xiyang, Yajin, and Zhuhe.

- Hongfang has jurisdiction over 19 administrative villages:

Banzaixie, Beiyang, Chikeng, Daoliushui, Dongpu, Dongyang, Jinbei, Kanyang, Lianhe, Lingbei, Longxibang, Longxing, Nanyang, Pingyang, Shangyang, Tianxin, Xiayang, Zhonglian, and Zian.

- Jiangshan has jurisdiction over 16 administrative villages:

Beiyang, Cumei, Fukeng, Keshan, Laozhai, Linsi, Meixi, Qiancun, Shantang, Shantou, Shanwan, Shuangche, Tongbo, Xiaowan, Xintian, and Xinzhai.

- Shizhong has jurisdiction over 22 administrative villages:

Baiye, Banxi, Baofeng, Fengtian, Juzhou, Lantian, Renhe, Sankeng, Shangyu, Wenzhuang, Xiaci, Xiangshan, Xiayu, Xibing, Xinci, Yangdong, Yanxi, Yanzhong, Yingkeng, Zhongxi, Zhongxin, and Zhuhua.

- Suban has jurisdiction over 16 administrative villages:

Dakeng, Donglian, Hemu, Hexi, Hongbang, Huangdi, Liling, Lulin, Meishan, Shicheng, Suban, Wuyang, Xi, Xilou, and Yijiabang.

- Wan'an has jurisdiction over 20 administrative villages:

Chenyang, Fuzhu, Gaochi, Gaolin, Gaoxia, Haokeng, Hongguang, Huakeng, Huankeng, Meicun, Shicheng, Siczhu, Songyang, Tongxin, Tutan, Wucun, Xiguan, Xiyuan, Zhangchen, and Zhuguan.

- Xiaochi has jurisdiction over 13 administrative villages:

Hejiabei, Huangxi, Huangxie, Jingyuan, Laibang, Nanshan, Niumenshi, Peixie, Rulu, Shanmei, Wangyang, Xinggui, and Zhuoyang.

- Yanshan has jurisdiction over 13 administrative villages:

Danshe, Houpu, Huanggu, Jiashan, Laishan, Liliao, Liukeng, Longshan, Qinyuan, Shanqian, Xiaodingkeng, Yuanqing, and Yubao.

- Yanshi has jurisdiction over 33 administrative villages:

Baishi, Banwei, Beihe, Beishan, Chencun, Chicun, Daji, Dongnan, Honglin, Houlu, Huangzhuang, Jiudou, Kexi, Libang, Longkang, Loudun, Meitou, Minci, Pingkeng, Pingyang, Shanglao, Shangying, Shewei, Siji, Subang, Xiaying, Xiazhong, Xinlu, Yangcheng, Yanjiang, Yanxing, and Yunshan.

== Transportation ==
The district is served by Longyan railway station.
