= Longyan =

Prefecture-level city in south-western Fujian Province, China

Longyan 龙岩市 Lungyen
- Prefecture-level city
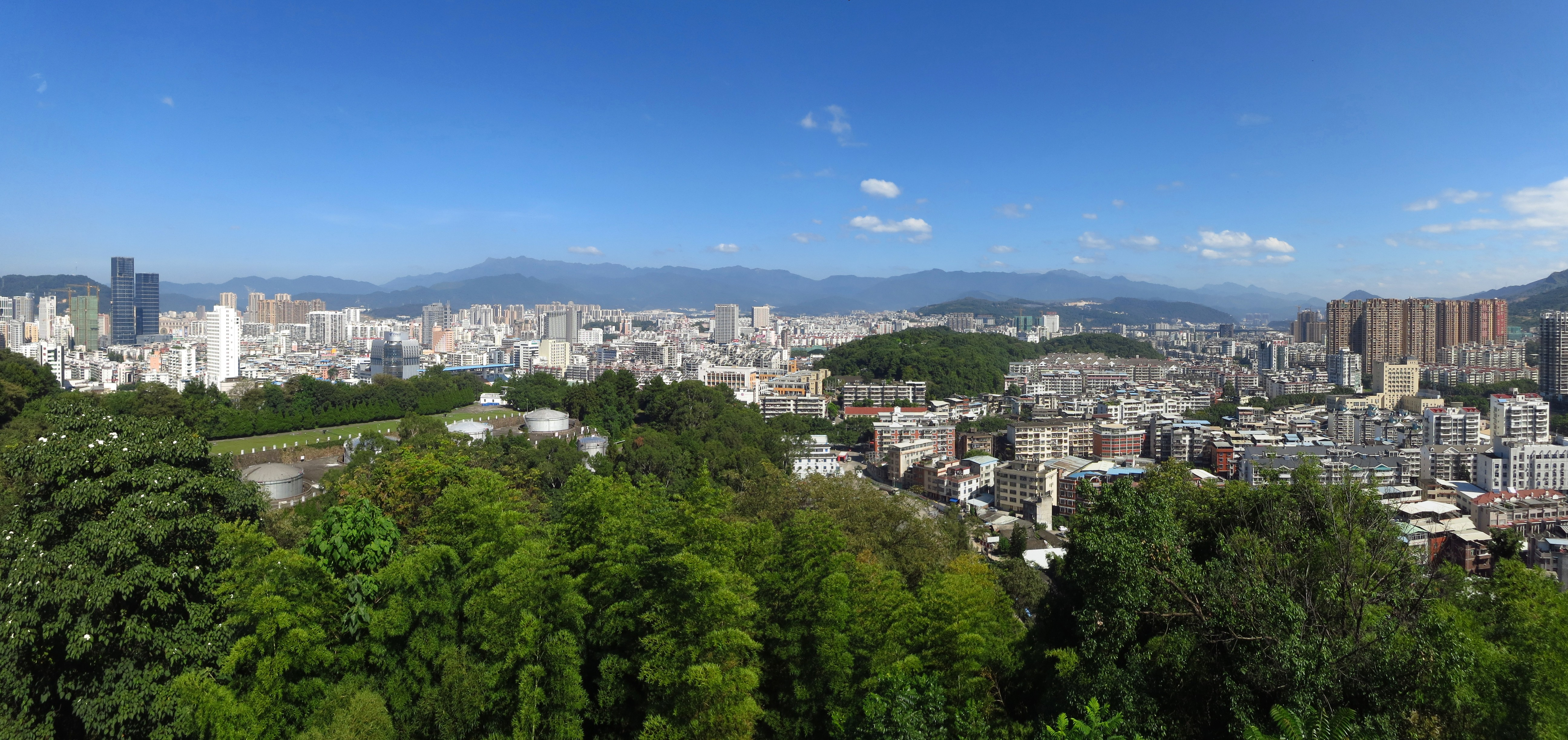
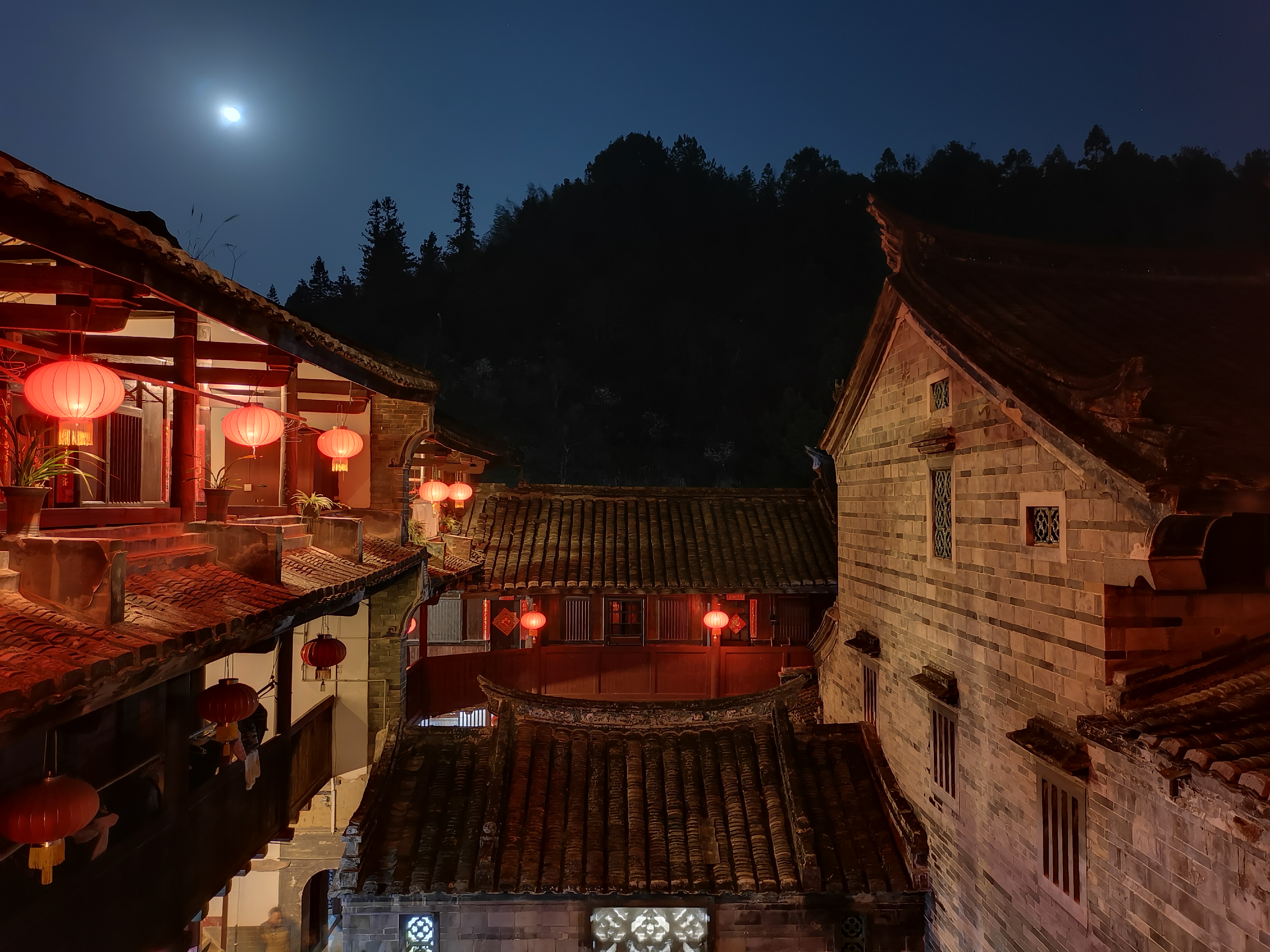
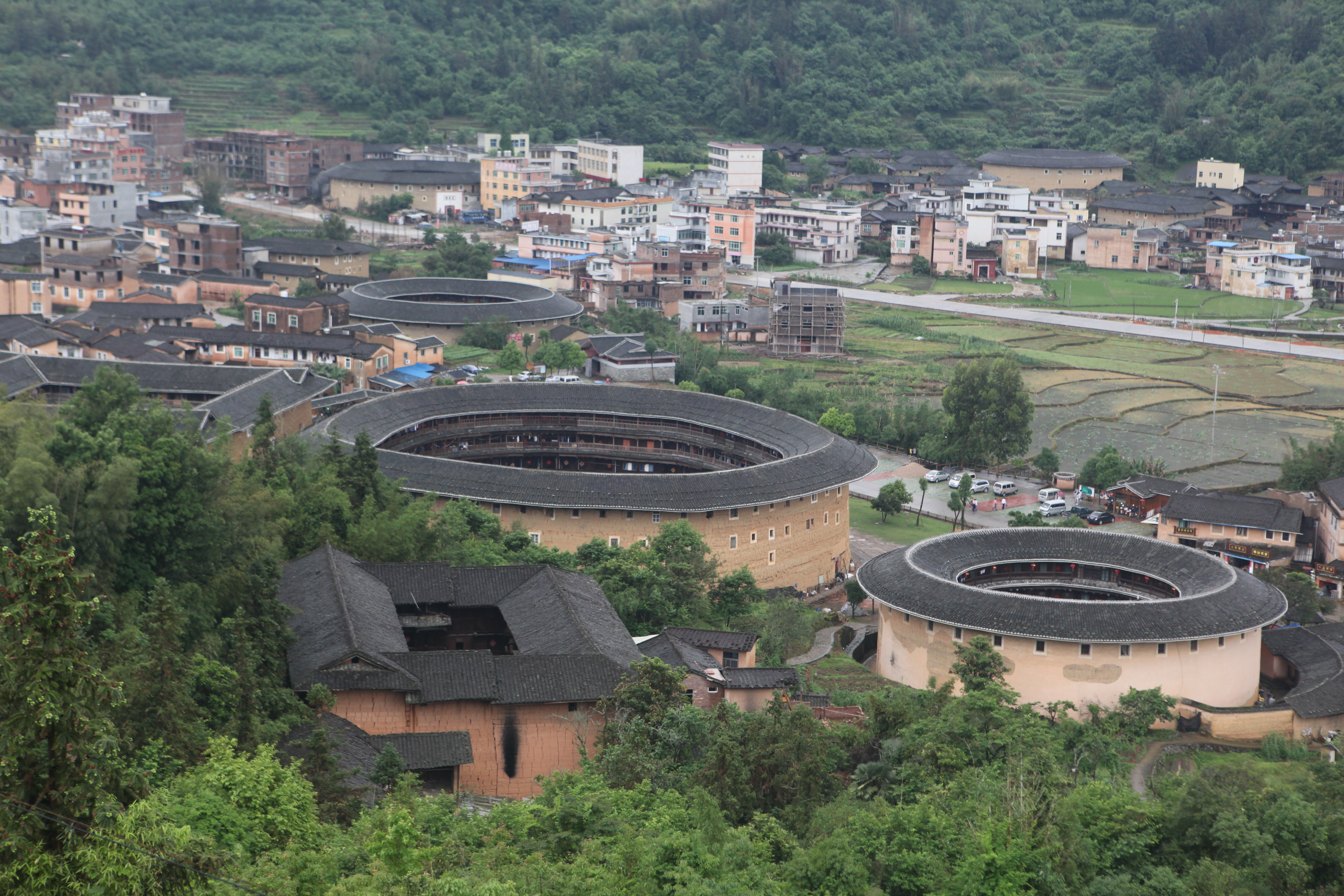
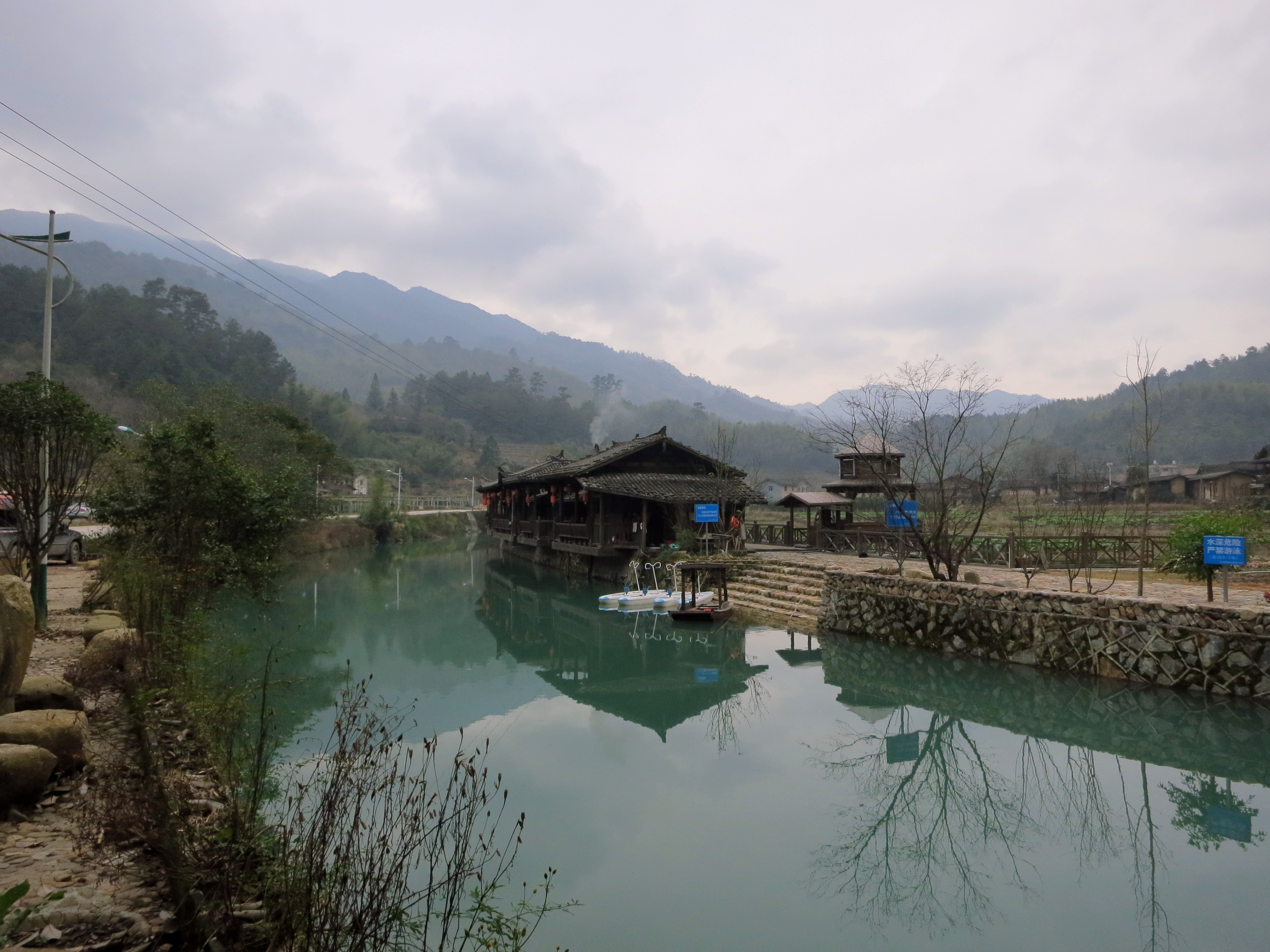
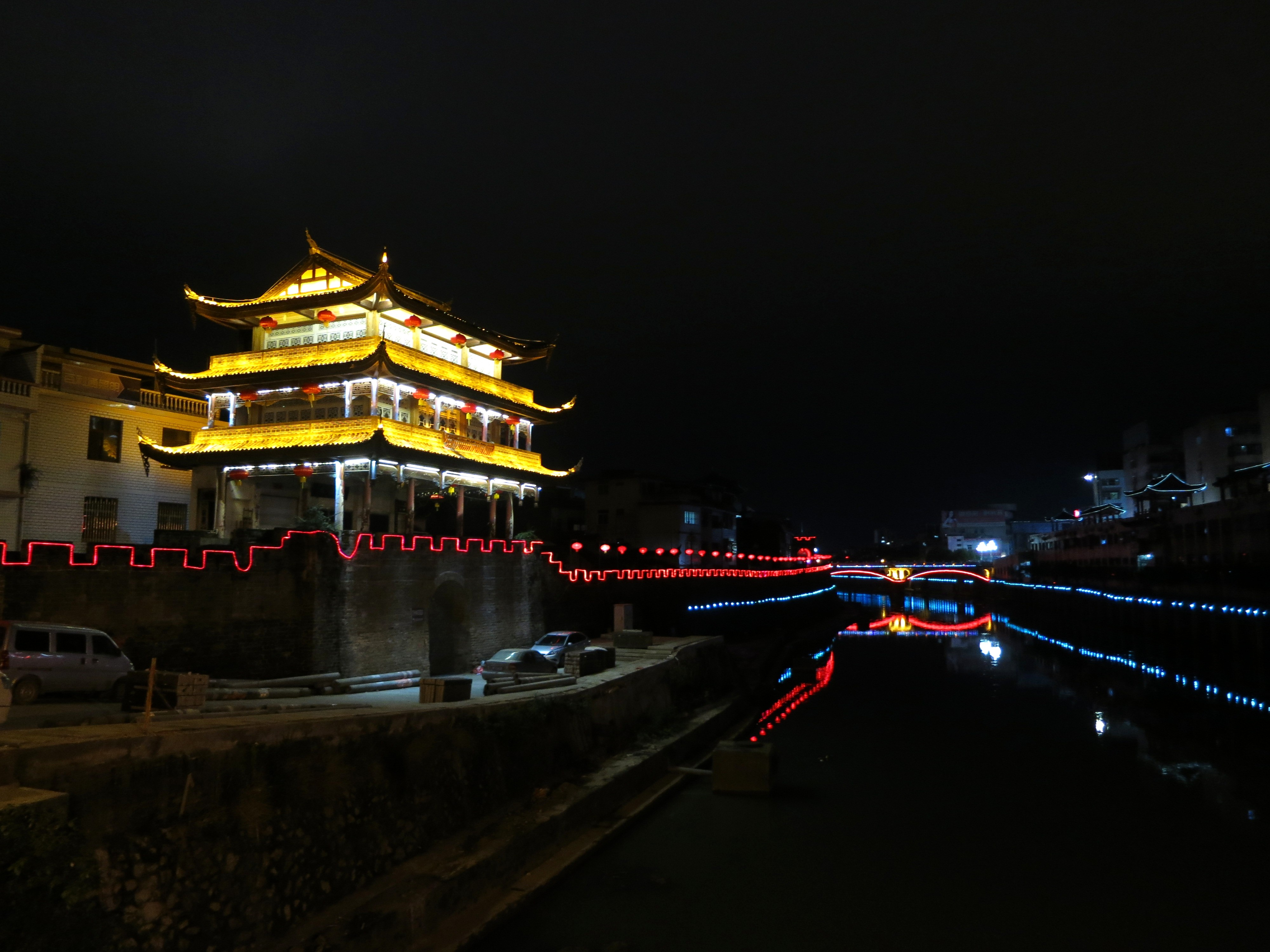
- Clockwise from top: Longyan City, Chuxi tulou cluster in Yongding District, the ancient city walls in Changting County, Zhangdi village, and a night view from inside a tulou.

- Interactive map of Longyan
- Location within Fujian Location within China
- Coordinates (Longyan municipal government): 25°04′34″N 117°01′01″E
- Country: China
- Province: Fujian
- Municipal seat: Xinluo

Area
  - Prefecture-level city: 19,069 km^{2} (7,363 sq mi)

Population (2020)
  - Prefecture-level city: 2,723,627
  - Density: 142.83/km^{2} (369.93/sq mi)
  - Urban: 1,712,623

GDP
  - Prefecture-level city: CN¥ 287 billion US$ 41.6 billion
  - Per capita: CN¥ 105,548; US$ 16,575
- Time zone: UTC+08:00 (CST)
- Postal code: 364000, 366000
- Area code: 597
- ISO 3166 code: CN-FJ-08
- License plate: 闽F
- Administrative division code: 350800
- Local dialect: Longyan Min and Hakka Chinese
- Website: Longyan.gov.cn

Longyan (simplified Chinese: 龙岩; traditional Chinese: 龍巖; pinyin: Lóngyán; Pe̍h-ōe-jī: Lêng-nâ or Liong-nâ; lit. 'dragon rock'; Hakka: Liùng-ngàm; Longyan dialect: Liông-nâ [lioŋ¹¹ nã¹¹]) is a prefecture-level city in south-western Fujian Province, China, bordering Guangdong to the south and Jiangxi to the west.

== History ==
In 736 AD (during the Tang dynasty), the prefecture of Tingzhou was established in western Fujian, or Minxi (闽西), administering Changting, Huanglian and Xinluo counties. Six years later Xinluo was named Longyan for the nearby cavern, a famous scenic site.

Due to the ancient conflicts in central China and aggression from northern tribes, many Han people moved from central China to Longyan.

In 1734, the Hokkien-speaking counties of Longyan city and Zhangping were ceded from Zhangzhou to form the Longyan Prefecture within the Hakka peasant Tingzhou prefecture, a typical Hakka peasant society culturally distinct from the Minnanese by the imperial court. In 1913, it reverted to its former name Longyan County and in 1981, Longyan City was established.

Minxi was a strategic base during the Chinese Civil War.

It is said that tens of thousands of people were recruited from the Hakka peasantry from the western Longyan to join the PLA during the Chinese Civil War, and nearly every Hakka family had someone sacrificed lives on behalf of CCP side especially during Mao's early purges in Tingzhou and Ganzhou which killed roughly 700,0000 Hakka people and some ethnic minorities. There are more than 26,000 locals that took part in the Long March which in total was carried out by 86,000. Moreover, during 1955 and 1968, 68 people from Longyan were awarded Brigadier General or above, which accounts for 82% of all generals from Fujian province at the time, therefore, Longyan is also named as "The Home of Generals".

== Environment ==
Unlike many Chinese cities, the forest coverage of Longyan reaches an unusually high 77.9%, which is unparalleled in Fujian province. Meihuashan National Nature Reserve, a part of the China Biosphere Reserve Network, is located in Longyan.

Goby Rhinogobius longyanensis was first described from Longyan and named after it. Presumably also the prehistoric bivalve Claraia longyanensis got its name from Longyan.

== Geography and climate ==
Longyan is situated in the upper reaches of the Jiulong and Ting Rivers. It borders the prefecture-level cities of Sanming to the north, Quanzhou to the east, Zhangzhou to the southeast, Meizhou (Guangdong) to the southwest, and Ganzhou (Jiangxi) to the west and northwest.

Longyan has a monsoon-influenced humid subtropical climate (Köppen climate classification Cfa), with short, mild winters, and long, hot and humid summers. Despite its inland location, the city's summers rank among the mildest in the province, averaging lower than even Xiamen and the islands of Pingtan County, both of which receive significant maritime moderation. Rainfall is greatest in spring and early summer and at its least in autumn and early winter.

Climate data for Longyan, elevation 376 m (1,234 ft), (1991–2020 normals, extremes 1971–2010)
Month	Jan	Feb	Mar	Apr	May	Jun	Jul	Aug	Sep	Oct	Nov	Dec	Year
Record high °C (°F)	28.1 (82.6)	29.8 (85.6)	31.5 (88.7)	33.9 (93.0)	35.0 (95.0)	37.5 (99.5)	39.0 (102.2)	37.1 (98.8)	36.6 (97.9)	35.2 (95.4)	34.6 (94.3)	28.1 (82.6)	39.0 (102.2)
Mean daily maximum °C (°F)	17.9 (64.2)	19.2 (66.6)	21.5 (70.7)	25.6 (78.1)	28.7 (83.7)	30.8 (87.4)	33.2 (91.8)	32.8 (91.0)	31.2 (88.2)	27.9 (82.2)	23.9 (75.0)	19.3 (66.7)	26.0 (78.8)
Daily mean °C (°F)	12.2 (54.0)	13.8 (56.8)	16.4 (61.5)	20.5 (68.9)	23.7 (74.7)	26.0 (78.8)	27.4 (81.3)	26.9 (80.4)	25.5 (77.9)	22.1 (71.8)	18.0 (64.4)	13.2 (55.8)	20.5 (68.9)
Mean daily minimum °C (°F)	8.4 (47.1)	10.3 (50.5)	13.0 (55.4)	16.9 (62.4)	20.2 (68.4)	22.8 (73.0)	23.6 (74.5)	23.3 (73.9)	21.8 (71.2)	17.9 (64.2)	13.8 (56.8)	9.3 (48.7)	16.8 (62.2)
Record low °C (°F)	−1.9 (28.6)	−0.8 (30.6)	−0.9 (30.4)	5.6 (42.1)	12.1 (53.8)	15.4 (59.7)	19.4 (66.9)	17.7 (63.9)	13.8 (56.8)	6.0 (42.8)	1.4 (34.5)	−3.0 (26.6)	−3.0 (26.6)
Average precipitation mm (inches)	68.5 (2.70)	95.6 (3.76)	177.4 (6.98)	190.6 (7.50)	260.4 (10.25)	331.0 (13.03)	179.2 (7.06)	235.7 (9.28)	134.2 (5.28)	46.8 (1.84)	45.3 (1.78)	48.0 (1.89)	1,812.7 (71.35)
Average precipitation days (≥ 0.1 mm)	8.9	11.9	17.2	16.6	18.0	19.4	15.5	17.6	12.0	5.7	6.2	7.1	156.1
Average snowy days	0.2	0	0	0	0	0	0	0	0	0	0	0	0.2
Average relative humidity (%)	72	75	77	77	77	79	75	78	75	70	70	71	75
Mean monthly sunshine hours	122.5	98.0	92.3	107.5	118.7	129.7	202.5	184.2	170.0	176.6	156.6	145.3	1,703.9
Percentage possible sunshine	37	31	25	28	29	32	49	46	47	50	48	44	39
Source 1: China Meteorological Administration
Source 2: Weather China

== Demographics ==
The prefecture-level city of Longyan had a population of 2,559,545 inhabitants as of 2010, according to the 2010 National Census. The population of Longyan in 2010 was 4.65% inferior than in 2000 (when the inhabitants of the city stand at 2,684,310), giving an average annual rate of growth of -0.47%.

== Administration ==
The municipal executive, legislature, and judiciary are in Xinluo District (新罗区), together with the CPC and Public Security Bureau. The information about population uses the 2010 Census data.

Map
English name	Simplified	Pinyin	Hakka	Area	Population	Density
Xinluo District	新罗区	Xīnluó Qū	Sîn-lò-khî	2,685	662,429	247
Yongding District	永定区	Yǒngdìng Qū	Yún-thin-khî	2,216	362,658	164
Zhangping City	漳平市	Zhāngpíng Shì	Chông-phìn-sṳ	2,975	240,194	81
Changting County	长汀县	Chángtīng Xiàn	Tshòng-tin-yen	3,099	393,390	127
Liancheng County	连城县	Liánchéng Xiàn	Lièn-sàng-yen	2,596	248,645	96
Shanghang County	上杭县	Shàngháng Xiàn	Sông-hông-yen	2,879	374,047	130
Wuping County	武平县	Wǔpíng Xiàn	Vú-phìn-yen	2,630	278,182	106

== Culture ==
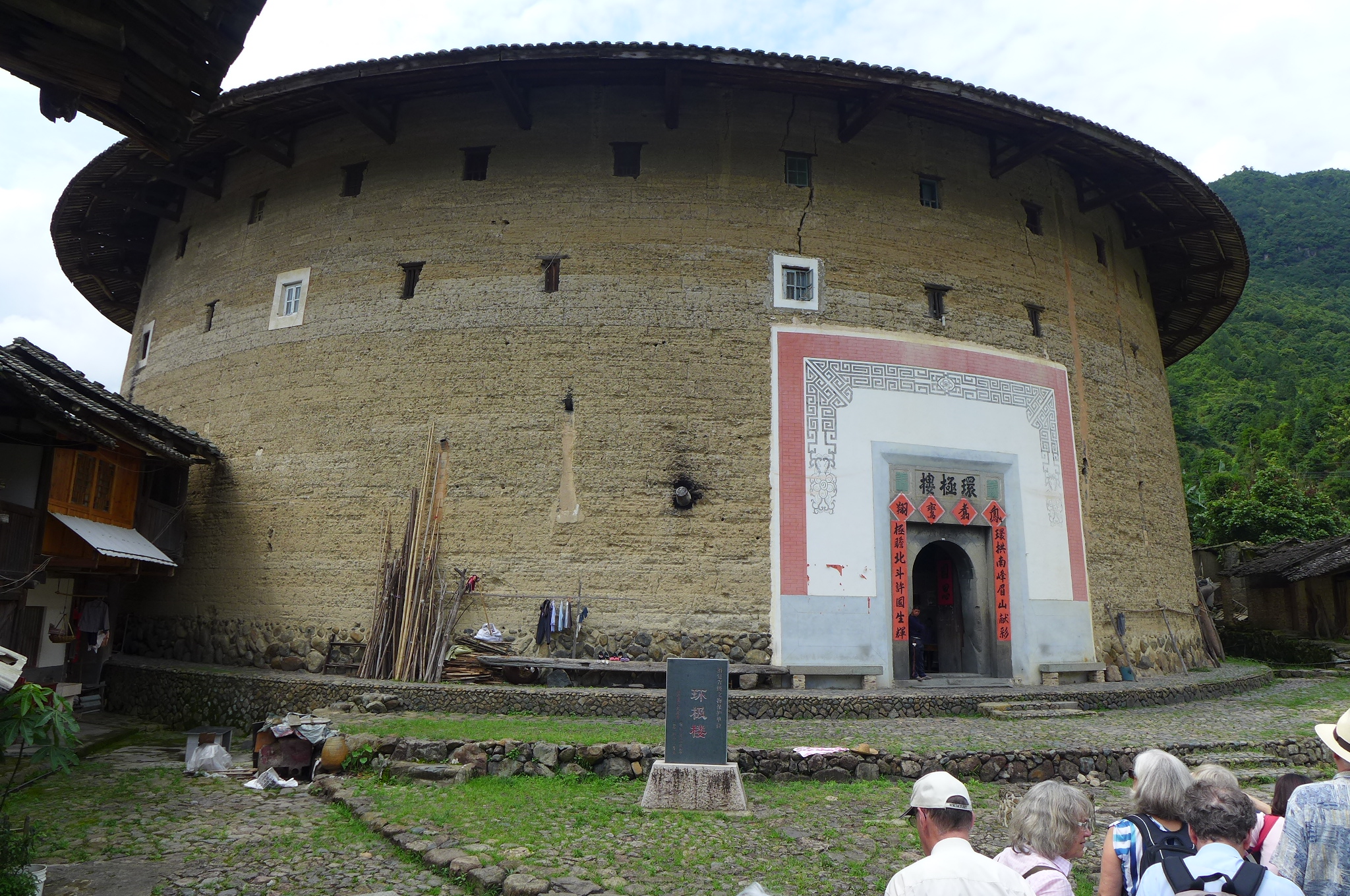
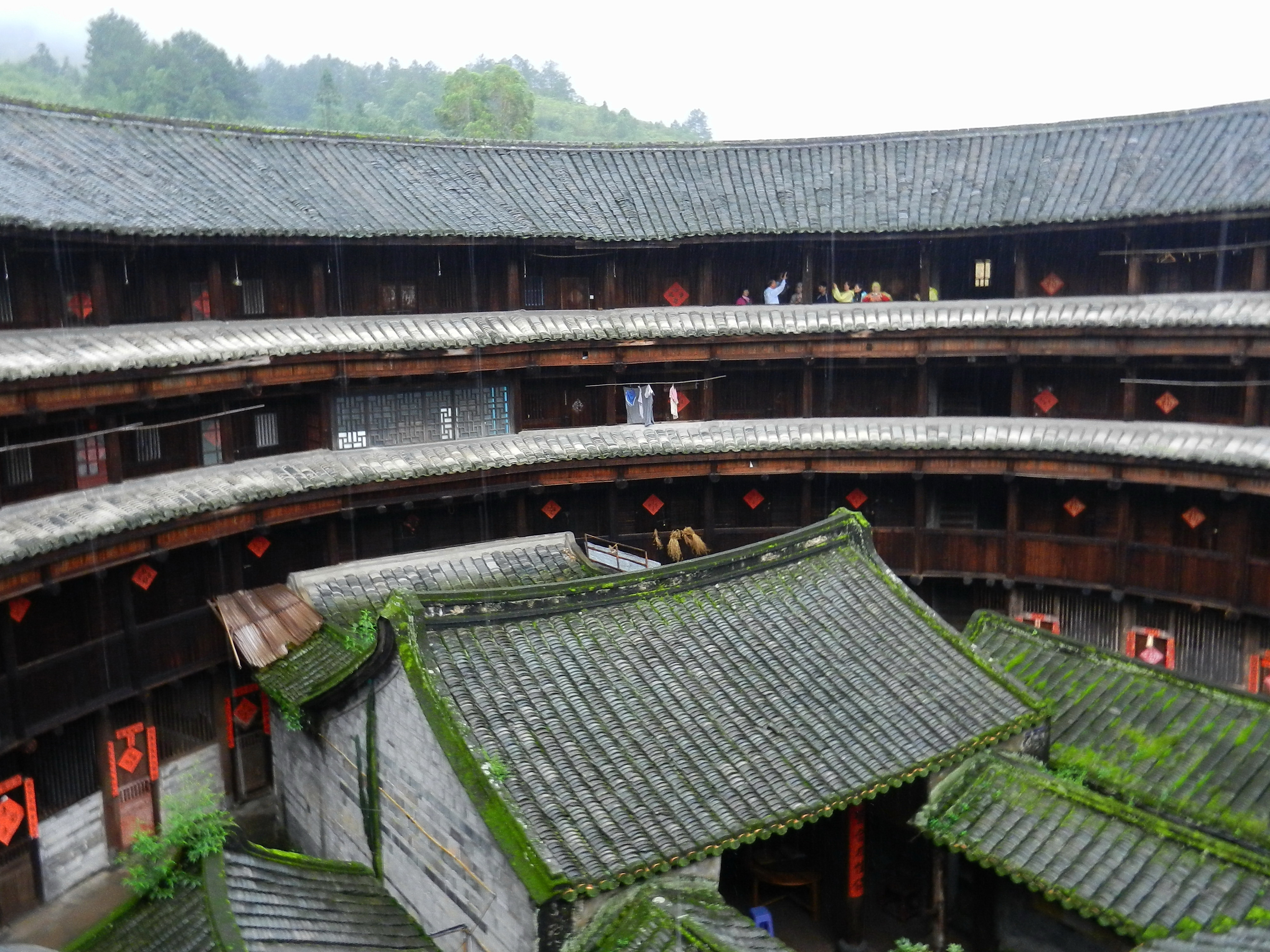
Exterior and interior views of a Fujian tulou from Longyan. They are traditional type of communal home used by the Hakka people.

Longyan is inhabited by Hoklo people and Hakka peasants. The Hoklo people live in the urban areas and cities of Xinluo and Zhangping districts in the eastern Longyan prefecture and speak Longyan Min while Hakka peasants live in rural village areas of the countryside of the western part of the prefecture, making western Longyan famous for being named as the "Home of Hakka People". The rural county of Changting is often referred to as the home of the Hakka, while the Ting River is known as the "mother river" of the Hakka people.

Longyan is a recent artificial construct of the Chinese government, having never been united together before the creation of Modern China. The two culturally distinct and separate Hoklo eastern city areas and Hakka western rural peasant areas have almost nothing in common in terms of language, culture and living habits, and were only forcibly merged into a single administrative region recently in history by the communist government.

== Economy ==
Longyan serves as a strategic center for the distribution of goods to Xiamen, Quanzhou and Zhangzhou. It also acts as a gateway for trade with Guangdong and Jiangxi province. It is the main connection between the inland and coastal area.

Longyan is rich in natural resources such as important mineral deposits and forest zones. The Septwolves tobacco business is an important contributor to the local economy, as is the Zijin Mining group. The largest construction equipment maker Lonking Holdings is based in the city.

== Transport ==
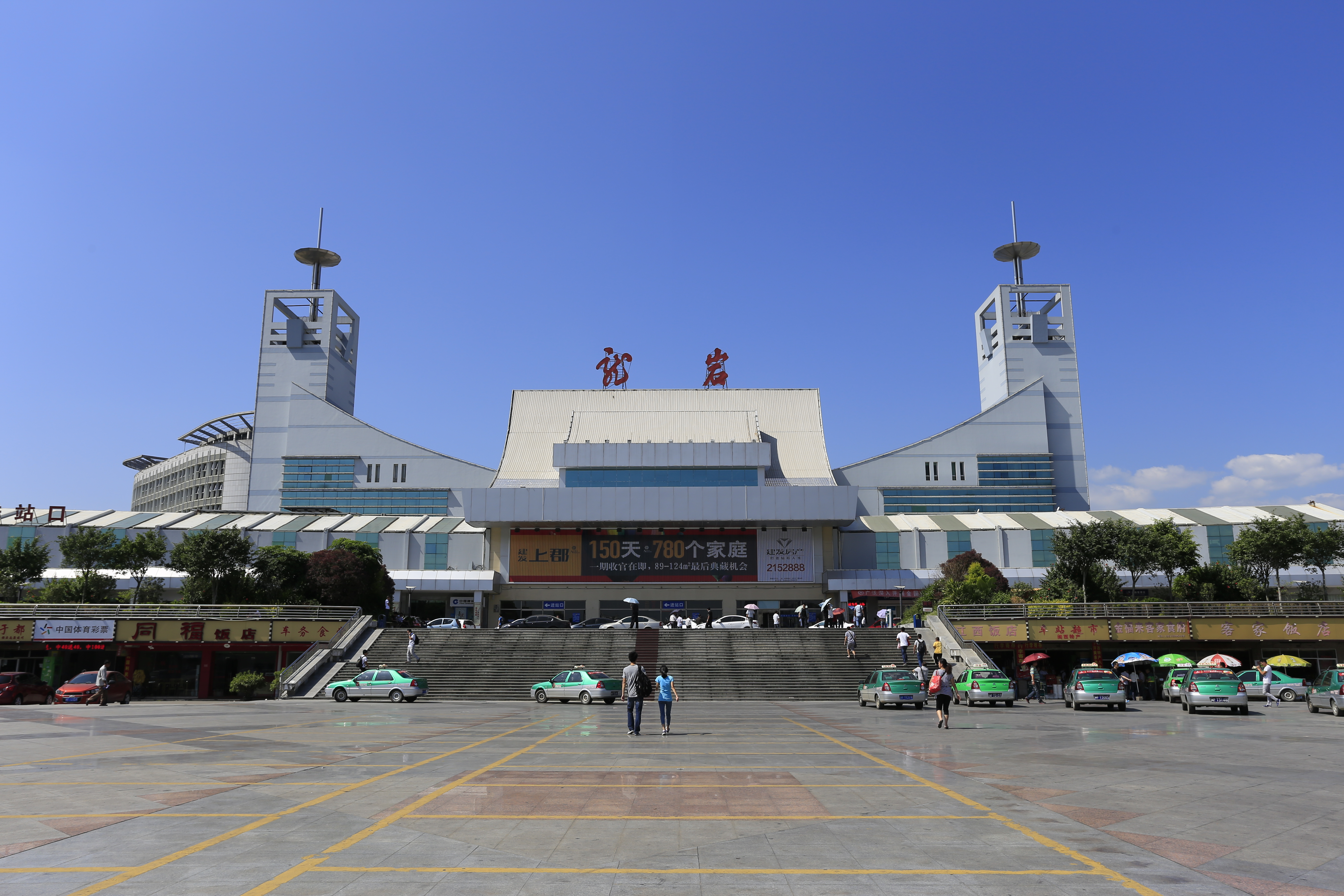
Longyan railway station

- Liancheng Guanzhaishan Airport
- The main railway station is Longyan railway station, which is a junction between the Longyan-Xiamen Railway (high-speed line opened in 2012), Ganzhou–Longyan Railway, and Zhangping–Longchuan railway.
- China National Highway 319
- G76 Xiamen–Chengdu Expressway

== Sister and friendship cities ==
Longyan has established a friendship city agreement with Wollongong, Australia since 2001. The connection includes many economic development initiatives, cultural and educational exchanges between primary schools and universities in both cities.

== Notable people from Longyan ==
- Zheng Xiaoying (b. 1929), the very first woman conductor in China.
- Chen Hong (b. 1979), number 1 badminton player on the world-ranking list from 2002 to 2003.
- Deng Zihui (1896–1972), former Chinese vice premier (1951–1965), one of the top leaders of the Chinese Communist Party.
- Huang Kunming (b. 1956), member of the 19th Politburo of China Communist Party.
- Lin Dan (b. 1983), gold medalist at the 2012 and 2008 Summer Olympics, top-ranked badminton player on the world ranking list from 2004 to 2008.
- Ong Schan Tchow (1900–1945), artist whose exhibitions in China and South-eastern Asia raised funds for the war relief effort and civilian victims of the Second Sino-Japanese War
- Shi Zhiyong (b. 1980), weightlifter, gold medalist at the 2004 Summer Olympics.
- Yang Chengwu (1914–2004), general of the People's Liberation Army.
- Zeng Jinyan (b. 1983), blogger and human rights activist.
- Zhang Dingcheng (1898 – December 16, 1981), Procurator-General of the Supreme People's Procuratorate from 1954 to 1975.
- Zhang Xiangxiang (b. 1983), weightlifter, gold medalist at the 2008 Summer Olympics and bronze medalist at the 2000 Summer Olympics.
- Zhang Yiming (b. 1983), Internet entrepreneur, founder of ByteDance, second-richest person in China.
- Lin Shen (b. 1980), actor, born in Beijing with ancestral roots in Longyan.
- Wang Xing (b. 1979), Internet entrepreneur, founder of Meituan-Dianping.

== See also ==
- Fujian tulou
- Longyan University
