= Baisha =

Baisha (Chinese: 白沙 unless otherwise noted) may refer to:

- Baisha, Penghu, a rural township in Penghu County (the Pescadores), Taiwan

== People's Republic of China ==
=== Subdistricts ===
- Baisha Subdistrict, Sanming, in Sanyuan District, Sanming, Fujian
- Baisha Subdistrict, Jiangmen, in Pengjiang District, Jiangmen, Guangdong
- Baisha Subdistrict, Yangjiang, in Jiangcheng District, Yangjiang, Guangdong
- Baisha Subdistrict, Haikou, in Meilan District, Haikou, Hainan
- Baisha Subdistrict, Ningbo, in Jiangbei District, Ningbo, Zhejiang

=== Towns ===
- Baisha, Jiangjin District, in Jiangjin District, Chongqing
- Baisha, Nanchuan District, in Nanchuan District, Chongqing
- Baisha, Minhou County, in Minhou County, Fujian
- Baisha, Putian, in Putian, Fujian
- Baisha, Shanghang County (白砂), in Shanghang County, Longyan, Fujian
- Baisha, Xinluo District, in Xinluo District, Longyan, Fujian
- Baisha, Gansu, in Qingshui County, Gansu
- Baisha, Leizhou, in Leizhou, Guangdong
- Baisha, Taishan, in Taishan, Guangdong
- Baisha, Yingde, in Yingde, Guangdong
- Baisha, Fuchuan County, in Fuchuan Yao Autonomous County, Guangxi
- Baisha, Guiping, in Guiping, Guangxi
- Baisha, Hepu County, in Hepu County, Guangxi
- Baisha, Liuzhou, in Liuzhou, Guangxi
- Baisha, Yangshuo County, in Yangshuo County, Guangxi
- Baisha, Shiqian County, in Shiqian County, Guizhou
- Baisha, Luoyang, in Yichuan County, Henan
- Baisha, Zhongmu County, in Zhongmu County, Henan
- Baisha, Xiaochang County, in Xiaochang County, Hubei
- Baisha, Huangshi, in Yangxin County, Hubei
- Baisha, Hunan, in Changning, Hunan
- Baisha, Jiangxi, in Jishui County, Jiangxi
- Baisha, Chengdu, in Chengdu, Sichuan
- Baisha, Hejiang County, in Hejiang County, Sichuan
- Baisha, Wanyuan, in Wanyuan, Sichuan
- Baisha, Yunnan, in Yulong Naxi Autonomous County, Yunnan

=== Other uses in People's Republic of China ===
- Baisha Li Autonomous County, an autonomous county in Hainan
- Baisha Township, Guizhou, a township in Pu'an County, Guizhou
- Baisha Lake, a lake and scenic spot in Altay Prefecture, Xinjiang
