= Jishui County =

Jishui 吉水县 Kishui
- County
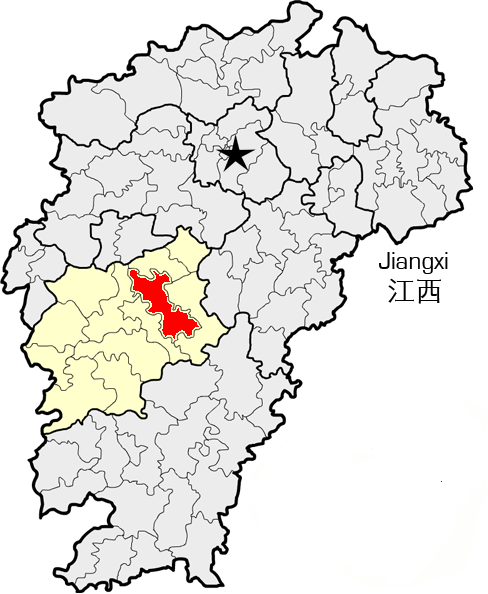
- Location of Jishui County (red) in Ji'an City (yellow) and Jiangxi
- Country: People's Republic of China
- Province: Jiangxi
- Prefecture-level city: Ji'an

Government
  - Secretary: Xiao Zicai

Area
  - Total: 2,571 km^{2} (993 sq mi)

Population
  - Total: 480,000
  - Density: 190/km^{2} (480/sq mi)
- Time zone: UTC+8 (China Standard)
- Area code: 0796
- postal code: 331600
- Website: www.jishui.gov.cn

Jishui (Chinese: 吉水; pinyin: Jíshuǐ) is a county located on the Gan River in Ji'an city, Jiangxi province, China.

It has an area of 2,531.73 km^{2} (977.51 sq mi) and a population of 480,000.

It is located central of Jiangxi (central east of Ji'an city), 196 km (122 mi) south of the provincial capital of Nanchang, and 23 km (14 mi) north of downtown Ji'an. The local speech is a variety of Gan Chinese.

The government of Jishui is located in Wenfeng town (文峰镇).

== History ==
Jishui has 1,300 years of history. It became a county during the Sui dynasty. There are many famous people from here, such as Ouyang Xiu, Yang Wanli (Song dynasty), Xie Jin (Ming dynasty), Luo Hongxian (Ming dynasty). The first Chinese map is made by Luo Hongxian who is from Jishui Futian (阜田).

== Climate ==
Climate data for Jishui, elevation 66 m (217 ft), (1991–2020 normals, extremes 1981–present)
Month	Jan	Feb	Mar	Apr	May	Jun	Jul	Aug	Sep	Oct	Nov	Dec	Year
Record high °C (°F)	26.3 (79.3)	31.4 (88.5)	33.6 (92.5)	35.7 (96.3)	36.1 (97.0)	37.5 (99.5)	41.1 (106.0)	40.7 (105.3)	38.5 (101.3)	36.8 (98.2)	32.5 (90.5)	25.6 (78.1)	41.1 (106.0)
Mean daily maximum °C (°F)	10.4 (50.7)	13.5 (56.3)	17.3 (63.1)	23.9 (75.0)	28.3 (82.9)	31.0 (87.8)	34.7 (94.5)	33.9 (93.0)	30.4 (86.7)	25.4 (77.7)	19.3 (66.7)	13.2 (55.8)	23.4 (74.2)
Daily mean °C (°F)	6.8 (44.2)	9.4 (48.9)	13.0 (55.4)	19.1 (66.4)	23.6 (74.5)	26.7 (80.1)	29.7 (85.5)	28.9 (84.0)	25.6 (78.1)	20.5 (68.9)	14.5 (58.1)	8.7 (47.7)	18.9 (66.0)
Mean daily minimum °C (°F)	4.2 (39.6)	6.5 (43.7)	10.0 (50.0)	15.7 (60.3)	20.2 (68.4)	23.6 (74.5)	25.8 (78.4)	25.3 (77.5)	22.1 (71.8)	16.7 (62.1)	10.9 (51.6)	5.5 (41.9)	15.5 (60.0)
Record low °C (°F)	−4.7 (23.5)	−4.2 (24.4)	−2.1 (28.2)	3.2 (37.8)	10.1 (50.2)	13.9 (57.0)	19.0 (66.2)	19.3 (66.7)	2.2 (36.0)	4.5 (40.1)	−0.3 (31.5)	−7.2 (19.0)	−7.2 (19.0)
Average precipitation mm (inches)	80.2 (3.16)	97.2 (3.83)	195.5 (7.70)	201.9 (7.95)	231.6 (9.12)	280.1 (11.03)	156.0 (6.14)	139.9 (5.51)	72.4 (2.85)	57.6 (2.27)	86.0 (3.39)	61.3 (2.41)	1,659.7 (65.36)
Average precipitation days (≥ 0.1 mm)	13.6	13.6	18.6	17.8	16.7	16.0	11.0	12.4	8.0	7.2	9.9	10.3	155.1
Average snowy days	2.4	1.1	0.3	0	0	0	0	0	0	0	0	0.8	4.6
Average relative humidity (%)	80	80	82	79	79	80	73	76	76	73	77	76	78
Mean monthly sunshine hours	69.6	71.8	76.4	107.9	132.8	140.3	234.7	212.7	161.1	148.2	119.9	108.0	1,583.4
Percentage possible sunshine	21	23	20	28	32	34	56	53	44	42	37	33	35
Source: China Meteorological Administration

== Economy ==
Jishui is a regional hub for agricultural production in Jiangxi Province. Products such as rice and oranges are economic staples. Jishui is a center for the production of traditional gloves, for which it ranks first in Jiangxi province in export value. The GDP of Jishui county in 2005 was 370 million Yuan.

== Transportation ==
=== Rail ===
Jishui has extensive railway infrastructure which connects to many important cities in other provinces, including Beijing, Wuhan, Shenzhen, Shangqiu and Fuyang. The Beijing-Jiulong Railway was built in 1997. Jishui Railway station is operated by Nanchang Bureau of Railways.

- Beijing-Jiulong Railway

=== Air ===
Jinggangshan Airport, built in 2004, is the main airport. It is situated in Taihe County, 50 kilometres north of the CBD. The airport is connected to major mainland cities such as Beijing, Shanghai, Guangzhou, and Shenzhen.

=== Road ===
The road transport infrastructure in Jishui is extensive. There are national highways that goes through Jishui. It is the No. 105 National roads No. 105 from Beijing to Zhuhai. Ganyue Expressway entrance is 18 km (11 mi) from the CDB.

- Ganyue Expressway
- China National Highway 105

An important development is the building of the Jishui Gan River Bridge (吉水赣江大桥), connecting the east and west banks of the Gan River. The bridge is 1,057 m (3,468 ft) long and 15 m (49 ft) wide. The project started in 2001 and was completed in 2004. The total investment was 117 million RMB. The Jishui Gan River Bridge was built to connect the 105 National Highway and Guanyue Expressway, and it also ends the history of ferrying between the East and West.

=== Water ===
Jishui is situated on the Gan River, Jishui Port is on the Gan River.

== Tourism ==
Attractions in Jishui include Yanfang Ancient Village (燕坊古村), Dadongshan, and Taohua Island.

== Administration ==
Under its direct administration it has 14 towns and 3 townships. The county government is located in Wenfeng.

14 Towns

- Wenfeng (文峰镇)
- Futian (阜田镇)
- Pangu (盘谷镇)
- Fengjiang (枫江镇)
- Huangqiao (黄桥镇)
- Jintan (金滩镇)
- Badu (八都镇)
- Shuangcun (双村镇)
- Laoqiao (醪桥镇)
- Luotian (螺田镇)
- Baishui (白水镇)
- Dingjiang (丁江镇)
- Wujiang (乌江镇)
- Shuinan (水南镇)
- Baisha (白沙镇) - was merged to the other

3 Townships

- Shangxian Township (尚贤乡)
- Shuitian Township (水田乡)
- Guanshan Township (冠山乡)
