= Yichuan =

Yichuan may refer to the following locations in China:

- Yichuan County, Henan (伊川县), of Luoyang Prefecture, Henan
- Yichuan County, Shaanxi (宜川县), of Yan'an Prefecture, Shaanxi
