= Xie Jin (disambiguation) =

Xie Jin (谢晋, 1923–2008) was a Chinese film director.

Xie Jin may also refer to:

- Xie Jin (painter) (謝縉, 1355–1430), Ming dynasty painter and calligrapher
- Xie Jin (mandarin) (解縉, 1369–1415), Ming dynasty mandarin, poet, erudite
