= Tangshan (disambiguation) =

Tangshan is a city in Hebei, China.

Tangshan may also refer to:

- Tangshan (唐山, Cantonese: Tong-saan, Hokkien: Tn̂g-soaⁿ, Hakka: Tong-san), one of the names of China or Mainland China mainly used by overseas Chinese and Taiwanese people of Guangdong and Fujian descent, no longer popular

== Locations in China ==
- Dangshan County, a county in Anhui, formerly romanized as "Tangshan"
- Tangshan, Anhui (唐山), a town in Huainan, Anhui
- Tangshan, Nanchang (塘山), a town in Nanchang, Jiangxi
- Tangshan, Shandong (唐山), a town in Huantai County, Shandong
- Tangshan Subdistrict, Nanjing (汤山街道), a subdistrict in Jiangning District, Nanjing, Jiangsu
- Tangshan Subdistrict, Shiqian County (汤山街道), a subdistrict in Shiqian County, Guizhou
- Tangshan Township (塘山乡), a township in De'an County, Jiangxi
