= Hetang Town =

Town in China

Coordinates: 27.5871°N 111.8897°E

Hetang Town is a town of Pengjiang District, Jiangmen, Guangdong, China. It covers an area of 32 square kilometers, with a population of 43,000.

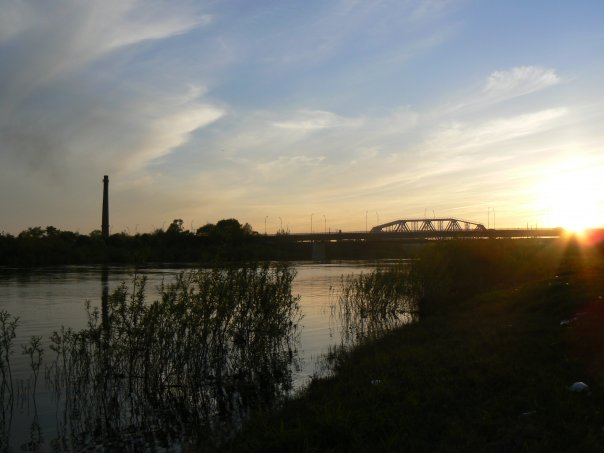
Hetang

== History ==
In the Southern Song dynasty, refugees fled the war zone and settled in Hetang town. They were the first inhabitants in this place. Since then, more refugees settled there and Hetang town become a habitat where different tribes peacefully dwelt. Since the Qing dynasty, people in Hetang Town went overseas to earn their living and seek their fortunes. Nowadays, Hetang Town is one of the famous towns in Guangdong province because of its cultural deposits and vitality.

== Geography ==
Hetang Town is an island lying on Xijiang River. It is located in the northeast of Pengjiang District and with Chaolian to its south. It is also the joint center of Jiangmen city, Foshan city and Zhongshan city.

== Local Specialty ==
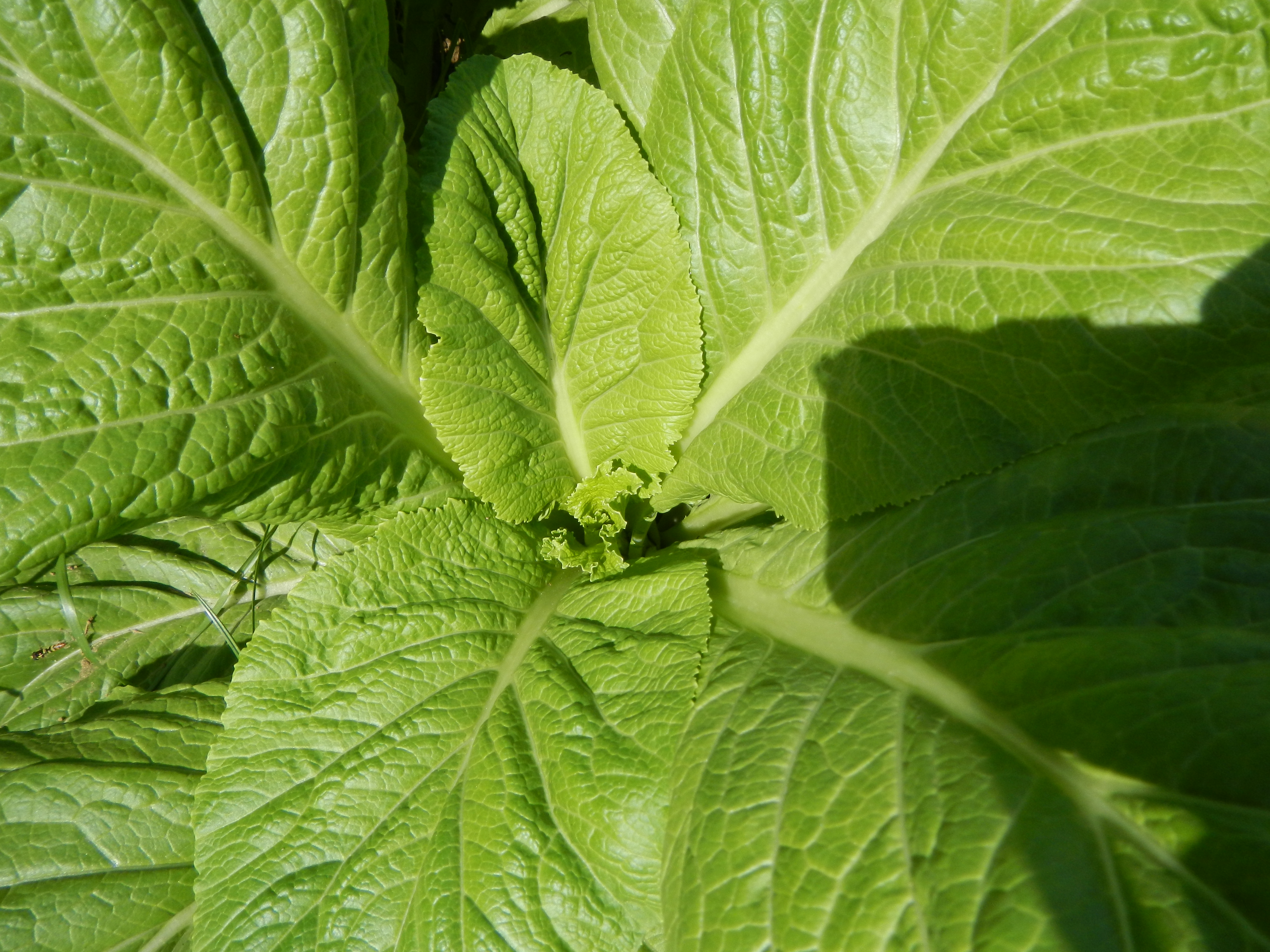
Leaf Mustard

Hetang Leaf Mustard is one of famous specialty of Hetang Town. Its cultivation has more than 200 years history, is one of the traditional export commodities, sales from as far away as Hong Kong, Macao, San Francisco and other places.

Hetang Leaf Mustard has a large root, long narrow leaves and with little fiber. After curing, its color turns into golden brown and tastes crisp sweet and salty in the sweet. It is often used to cook with meat for richer flavor.

Advances in technology have led to changes in the curing process of Hetang Leaf mustard. The product is popular among overseas Chinese communities and is often given as a gift to family and friends.

== Economy ==
Since the Reform and Opening, Hetang Town, as a famous hometown of overseas Chinese, has developed its economy with the help of foreign investment and local capital. With the completion of four bridges, Hetang Town became a joint center to link the cities around it together, such as Jiangmen, Foshan, Shunde and Zhongshan.

Its major industrial production include clothing, building materials, stainless steel products which attract customers and suppliers from Japan, Korea, Singapore to come to invest in enterprises. Meanwhile, Hetang Town actively create a superior investment environment for investors. It has built several industrial development zone to meet the needs of the companies.

== Transportation ==
Hetang Town has a unique geographical location which it has built four bridges to connect the cities around it. It also has a developed highway network to connect to the pearl river delta large highway. People can drive to Hong Kong within just 2 hours and the water transportation can lead to Hong Kong, Macao, and Guangzhou and so on.

== Notable people ==
- Andy Lau

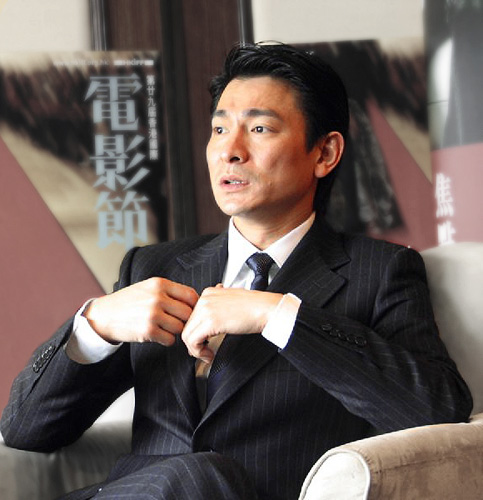
Andy Lau

Andy Lau's ancestral village is Leibu village which is one of the villages of Hetang Town. In 16 November 1997, Andy Lau accompanied his parents went back to Hetang Town and worshiped his ancestor in Lau's ancestral Hall. He also concerned about the education for children so he donated his money to build Yuanchang primary school.

- Joey Yung

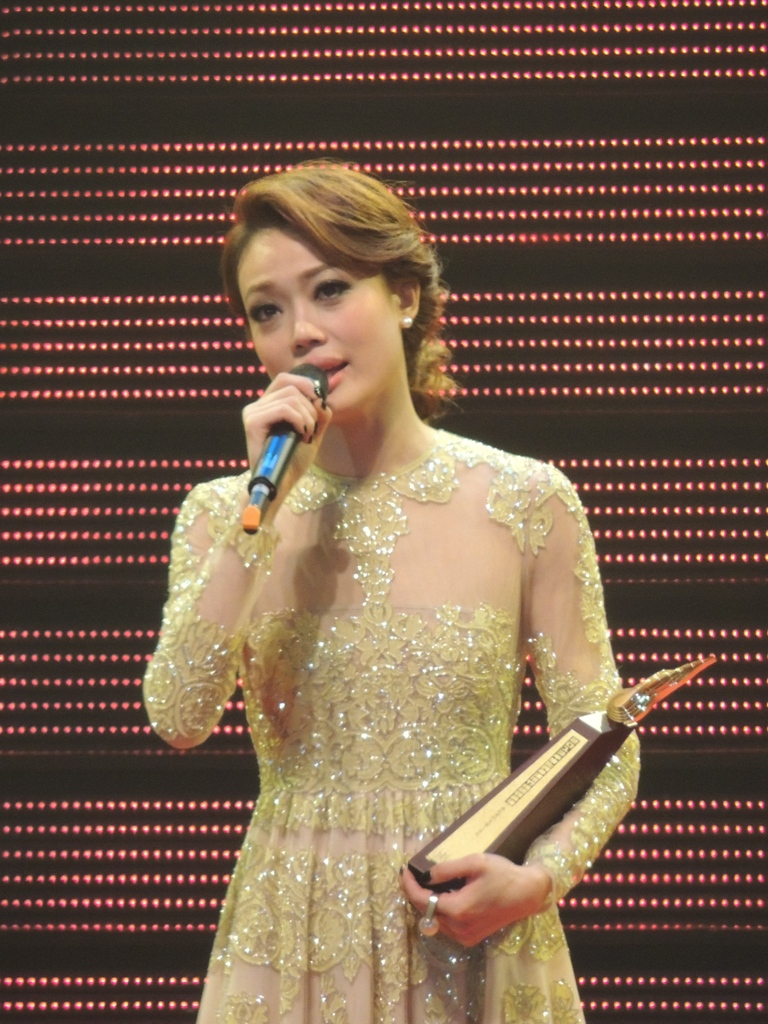
Joey Yung

Joey Yung's ancestral village is Liangchun village which is one of the villages of Hetang Town. In 2010, Joey Yung was invited to present in the Jiangmen Overseas Chinese Carnival as one of the stars who come from Jiangmen. Joey Yuang has been dreaming to come back to her hometown to find her root.
