= Pu'an County =

Pu'an County 普安县
- County
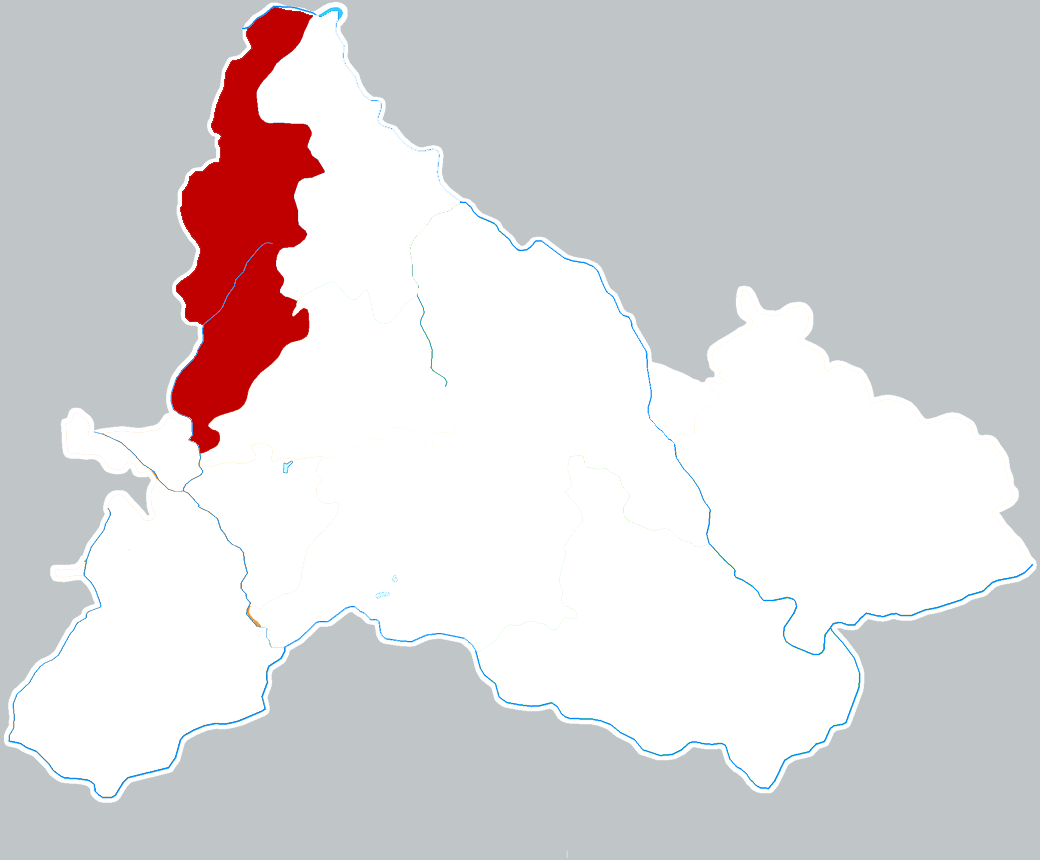

- Location of the seat in Guizhou Pu'an (Southwest China)
- Coordinates (Pu'an County government): 25°47′03″N 104°57′12″E
- Country: China
- Province: Guizhou
- Autonomous prefecture: Qianxinan
- County seat: Panshui

Area
  - Total: 1,429 km^{2} (552 sq mi)

Population (2010)
  - Total: 254,328
  - Density: 178.0/km^{2} (461.0/sq mi)
- Time zone: UTC+8 (China Standard)

Pu'an County
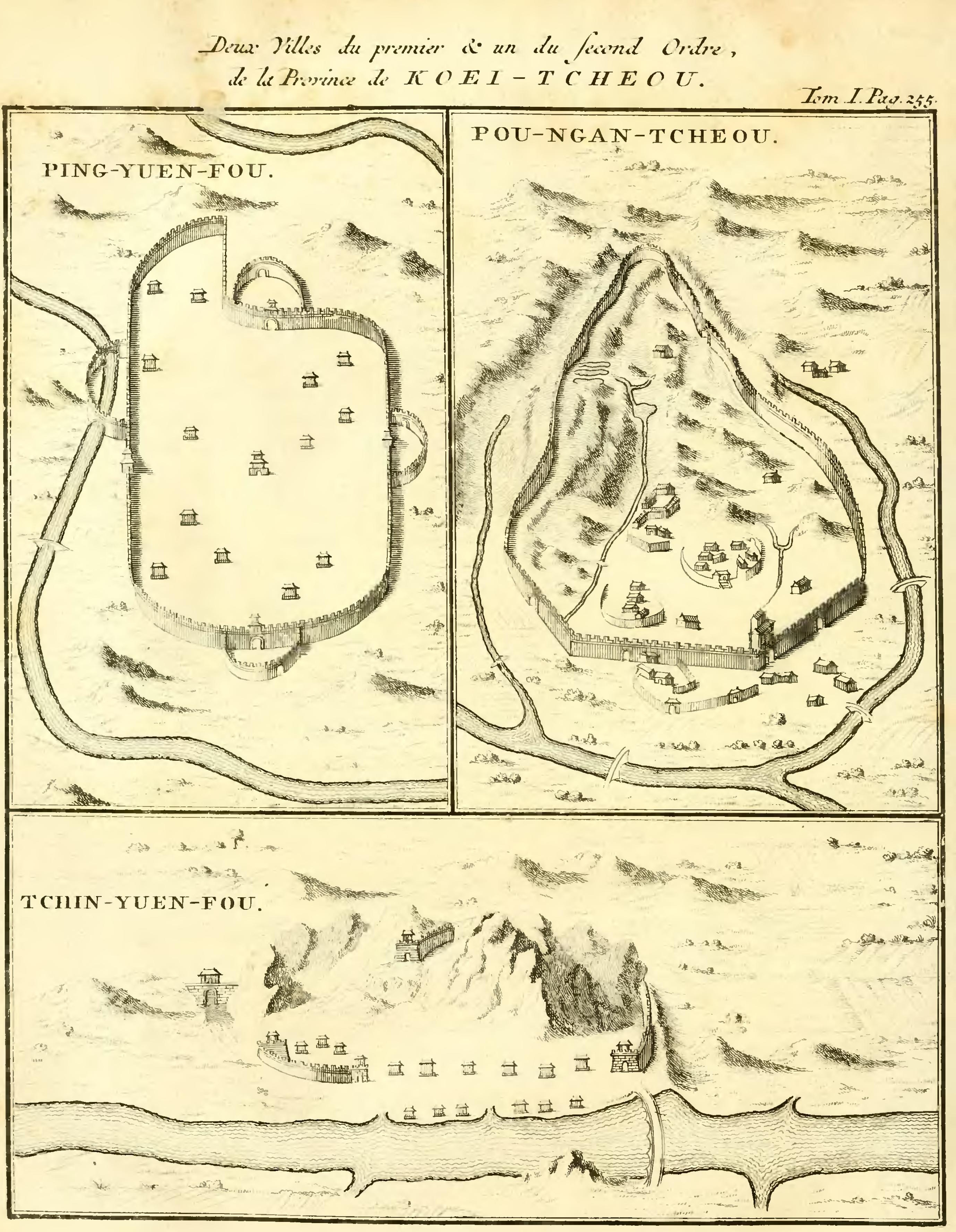
- "Pou-ngan-tcheou" and two other towns of Guizhou from Du Halde's 1736 Description of China, based on accounts by Jesuit missionaries
- Traditional Chinese: 普安縣
- Simplified Chinese: 普安县
Transcriptions
Standard Mandarin
- Hanyu Pinyin: Pǔ'ānxiàn
- Wade–Giles: P‘u-an Hsien

Pu'an County is a county of the Qianxinan Buyei and Miao Autonomous Prefecture in the southwest of Guizhou province, China.

== Administrative divisions ==
Pu'an County is divided into 4 subdistricts, 8 towns and 2 townships:

subdistricts

- Panshui 盘水街道
- Nanhu 南湖街道
- Chayuan 茶源街道
- Jiufeng 九峰街道

towns

- Longyin 龙吟镇
- Xingzhong 兴中镇
- Jiangxipo 江西坡镇
- Digua 地瓜镇
- Qingshan 青山镇
- Louxia 楼下镇
- Luohan 罗汉镇
- Xindian 新店镇

townships

- Baisha 白沙乡
- Gaomian 高棉乡

== Climate ==
Climate data for Pu'an, elevation 1,649 m (5,410 ft), (1991–2020 normals, extremes 1981–2010)
Month	Jan	Feb	Mar	Apr	May	Jun	Jul	Aug	Sep	Oct	Nov	Dec	Year
Record high °C (°F)	25.5 (77.9)	28.7 (83.7)	31.7 (89.1)	32.0 (89.6)	35.1 (95.2)	33.2 (91.8)	32.3 (90.1)	30.7 (87.3)	30.4 (86.7)	28.0 (82.4)	28.1 (82.6)	23.6 (74.5)	35.1 (95.2)
Mean daily maximum °C (°F)	9.0 (48.2)	12.2 (54.0)	16.8 (62.2)	21.2 (70.2)	23.4 (74.1)	24.2 (75.6)	25.1 (77.2)	24.9 (76.8)	22.6 (72.7)	18.3 (64.9)	15.6 (60.1)	10.2 (50.4)	18.6 (65.5)
Daily mean °C (°F)	4.9 (40.8)	7.5 (45.5)	11.4 (52.5)	15.8 (60.4)	18.4 (65.1)	20.0 (68.0)	20.8 (69.4)	20.4 (68.7)	18.3 (64.9)	14.5 (58.1)	11.1 (52.0)	6.3 (43.3)	14.1 (57.4)
Mean daily minimum °C (°F)	2.4 (36.3)	4.5 (40.1)	7.8 (46.0)	11.9 (53.4)	14.8 (58.6)	17.2 (63.0)	18.0 (64.4)	17.4 (63.3)	15.5 (59.9)	12.1 (53.8)	8.2 (46.8)	3.8 (38.8)	11.1 (52.0)
Record low °C (°F)	−5.8 (21.6)	−4.7 (23.5)	−4.1 (24.6)	0.9 (33.6)	5.5 (41.9)	10.5 (50.9)	11.1 (52.0)	9.7 (49.5)	6.9 (44.4)	3.3 (37.9)	−1.9 (28.6)	−5.8 (21.6)	−5.8 (21.6)
Average precipitation mm (inches)	27.9 (1.10)	21.3 (0.84)	34.2 (1.35)	55.5 (2.19)	136.1 (5.36)	261.1 (10.28)	271.7 (10.70)	200.1 (7.88)	149.1 (5.87)	87.9 (3.46)	31.3 (1.23)	21 (0.8)	1,297.2 (51.06)
Average precipitation days (≥ 0.1 mm)	16.7	13.8	13.8	13.4	15.8	20.1	19.8	18.4	15.0	17.1	11.4	13.9	189.2
Average snowy days	3.8	2.3	0.4	0	0	0	0	0	0	0	0.1	1.1	7.7
Average relative humidity (%)	85	79	75	72	75	82	83	82	82	86	82	85	81
Mean monthly sunshine hours	83.9	105.6	131.0	154.9	154.5	111.1	138.0	149.5	120.1	89.4	116.9	83.7	1,438.6
Percentage possible sunshine	25	33	35	40	37	27	33	37	33	25	36	26	32
Source: China Meteorological Administration

== Transportation ==
- Pu'anxian railway station on the Shanghai–Kunming high-speed railway
