= Chaolian Subdistrict =

Chaolian Subdistrict 潮连街道
- Subdistrict
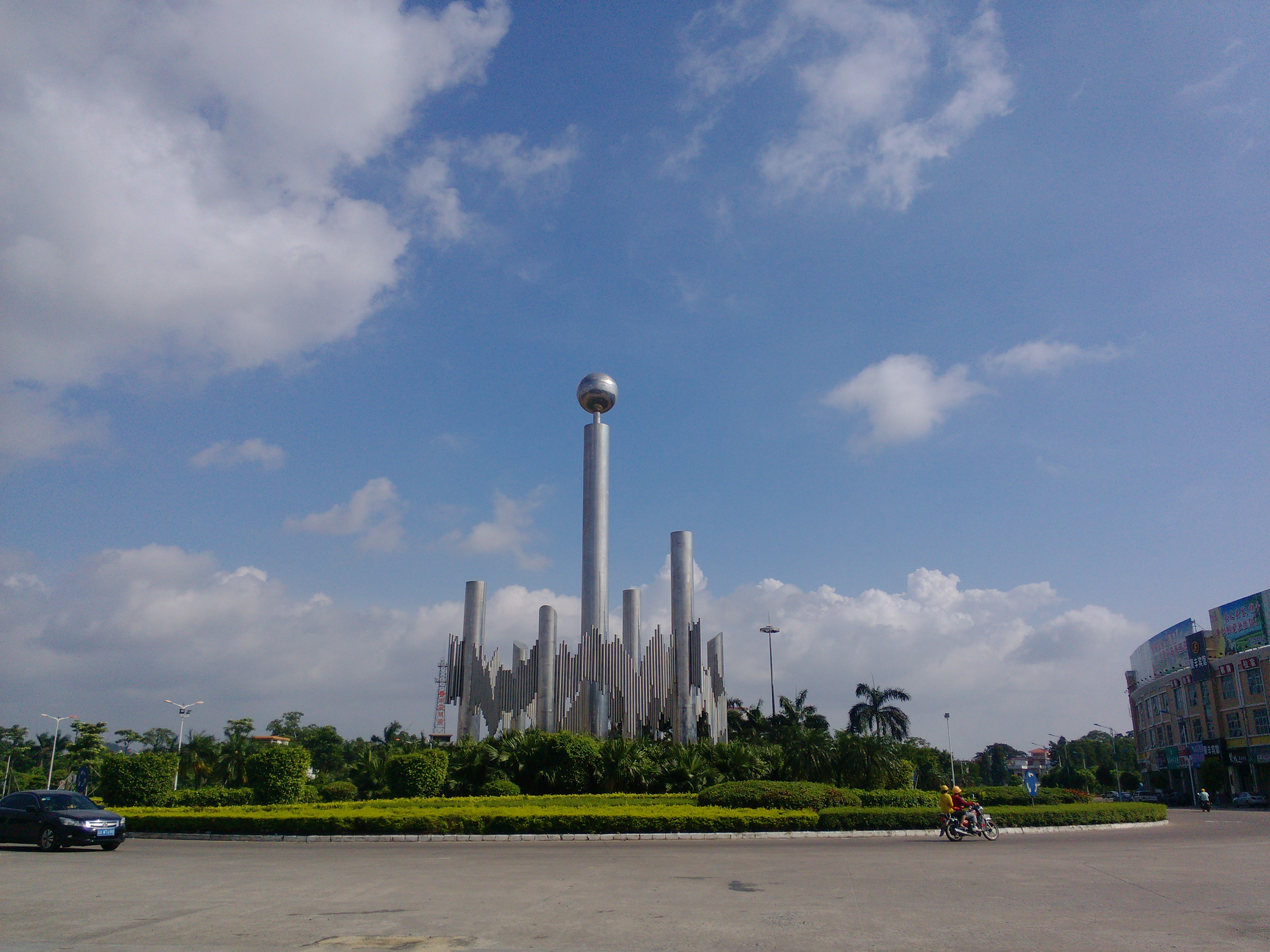

- Chaolian Subdistrict in Guangdong
- Coordinates: 22.6252°N 113.1174°E
- Country: People's Republic of China
- Province: Guangdong
- Prefecture-level city: Jiangmen
- District: Pengjiang District

Area
  - Total: 12.68 km^{2} (4.90 sq mi)

Population (2008)
  - Total: 12,808
  - Density: 1,010/km^{2} (2,616/sq mi)

Chaolian Subdistrict (simplified Chinese: 潮连街道; traditional Chinese: 潮連街道; pinyin: Cháolián Jiēdào) is a subdistrict of Pengjiang District, Jiangmen, Guangdong, China. It covers an area of 12.68 square kilometers and had a registered population of 12,808 as of 2008.

== History ==
Chaolian was a subdistrict called Hua'e Du of Xinhui District in the Qing Dynasty.

During the Republic of China, the area belonged to Xinhui County's Fourth District (新会县第四区). In 1955, the area fell under the jurisdiction of the Waihai People's Commune (外海公社). In 1961, the area was moved to the Hetang People's Commune (荷塘公社).

In 1977, the area was placed under the jurisdiction of Jiangmen as the Chaolian People's Commune (潮连公社). In 1983, Chaolian was changed to a district; in 1987, it was changed to a town; and in 2000, it was changed to a subdistrict.

== Geography ==
Chaolian Subdistrict is located on a river island in the Xi River. The subdistrict is bordered by the town of Guzhen to its east, Waihai Subdistrict to its south, central Pengjiang District to its west, and the town of Hetang to its north.

=== Climate ===
Chaolian has a subtropical monsoon climate.

== Administrative divisions ==
Chaolian Subdistrict administers six residential communities: Tangbian Residential Community (塘边社区), Zhishan Residential Community (芝山社区), Fugang Residential Community (富冈社区), Lubian Residential Community (卢边社区), Tanbian Residential Community (坦边社区), and Zhigang Residential Community (豸冈社区).

== Economy ==
The subdistrict's budget for 2020 totaled ¥92.58 million, with the biggest expenditures being on education and social security.

Since the Reform and Opening of China, many overseas Chinese originally hailing from Chaolian have invested in the area.

With the completion of Chaolian Bridge and Xijiang Bridge, Chaolian Subdistrict has transport links with surrounding cities, like Foshan and Guangzhou.

Chaolian is called "The Island of Diamond" after Henghe Diamond Co. Ltd.(Jiangmen), which is located there. Other important businesses within the subdistrict include Xijiang View Food Street, and Jiangmen Polytechnic.

== Tourism ==
- Hongsheng Park is in Fugang. In the north of Chaolian island, facing Xijiang, it is the expansion of Hongsheng Buddha Hall in 1984. It covers an area of more than 15,000 square meters, with beautifully designed structures. The artificial lake is quiet and beautiful with bridges and pavilions. The park is full of plants, from roses to peach flowers, mellows to bamboos. The main historical sites are Hongsheng Buddha Hall, the Loving Mother Pavilion, and the Four-Eyes-Well.
- Chaolian Beach Park is a place for barbecue, exercising, swimming, and relaxing.
- Lubian Ancestral Hall is in Lubian. It is famous for its ancient Chinese style architecture. Now it serves as a small museum for exhibition of paintings and photographs of local artists.

== Education ==
- Chaolian Central Kindergarten is in Lubian, and it is the biggest kindergarten in Chaolian.
- Yongsi Primary School is in Zhishan. It serves local children mainly.
- Chaolian Central School has its primary school section and its junior high school section. It locates at Lubian.
- Jiangmen Polytechnic is a higher education facility with a 30-year history, and it relocated in Chaolian in 2004.
