= Pengjiang, Jiangmen =

Pengjiang 蓬江区
- District
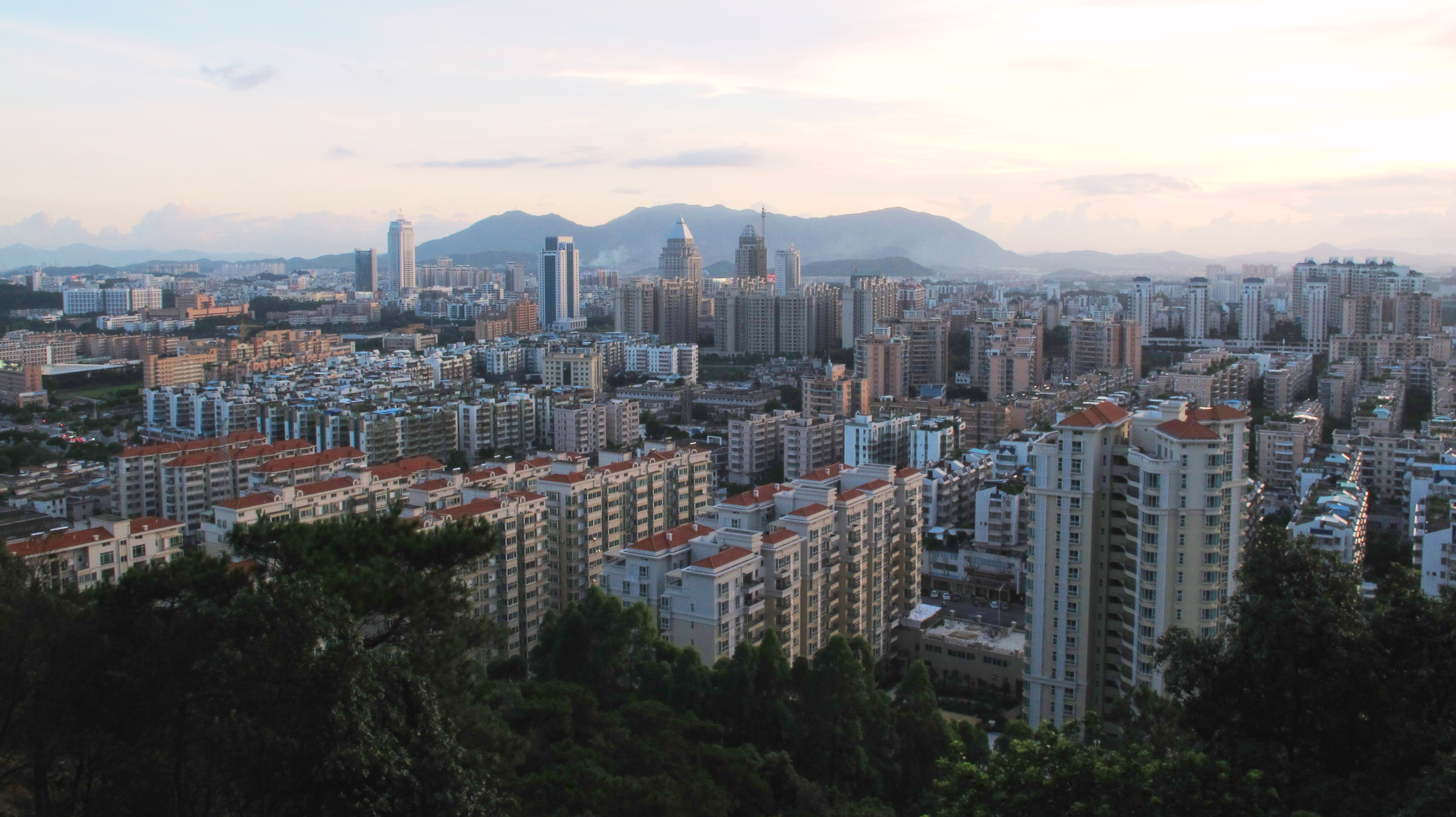

- Location in Guangdong
- Coordinates: 22°35′42″N 113°04′43″E
- Country: People's Republic of China
- Province: Guangdong
- Prefecture-level city: Jiangmen

Area
  - Total: 323.7 km^{2} (125.0 sq mi)

Population (2020)
  - Total: 853,007
  - Density: 2,635/km^{2} (6,825/sq mi)
- Time zone: UTC+8 (China Standard)

Pengjiang (Chinese: 蓬江; pinyin: Péngjiāng; Jyutping: fung^{4}gong^{1}) is a district of Jiangmen, Guangdong province, China.

== Administrative divisions ==
Name	Chinese (S)	Hanyu Pinyin	Population (2010)
Huanshi Subdistrict	环市街道	Huánshì Jiēdào	119,423
Canghou Subdistrict	仓后街道	Cānghòu Jiēdào	59,565
Didong Subdistrict	堤东街道	Dīdōng Jiēdào	76,765
Beijie Subdistrict	北街街道	Běijiē Jiēdào	58,374
Baisha Subdistrict	白沙街道	Báishā Jiēdào	109,791
Chaolian Subdistrict	潮连街道	Cháolián Jiēdào	29,395
Tangxia town	棠下镇	Tángxià Zhèn	76,021
Hetang town	荷塘镇	Hétáng Zhèn	88,085
Duruan town	杜阮镇	Dùruǎn Zhèn	101,727

== Transport ==
- Tangxia railway station
