= Baisha, Liuzhou =

Baisha 白沙镇
- Town
- Location in Guangxi
- Coordinates: 24°15′7″N 109°36′45″E
- Country: People's Republic of China
- Autonomous Region: Guangxi
- Prefecture-level city: Liuzhou
- District: Yufeng District
- Time zone: UTC+8 (China Standard)

Baisha (Chinese: 白沙) is a town of Yufeng District, Liuzhou, Guangxi, China. As of 2018, it has 6 villages under its administration.
