= Macau Red Cross =

Branch of Red Cross in Macau, China

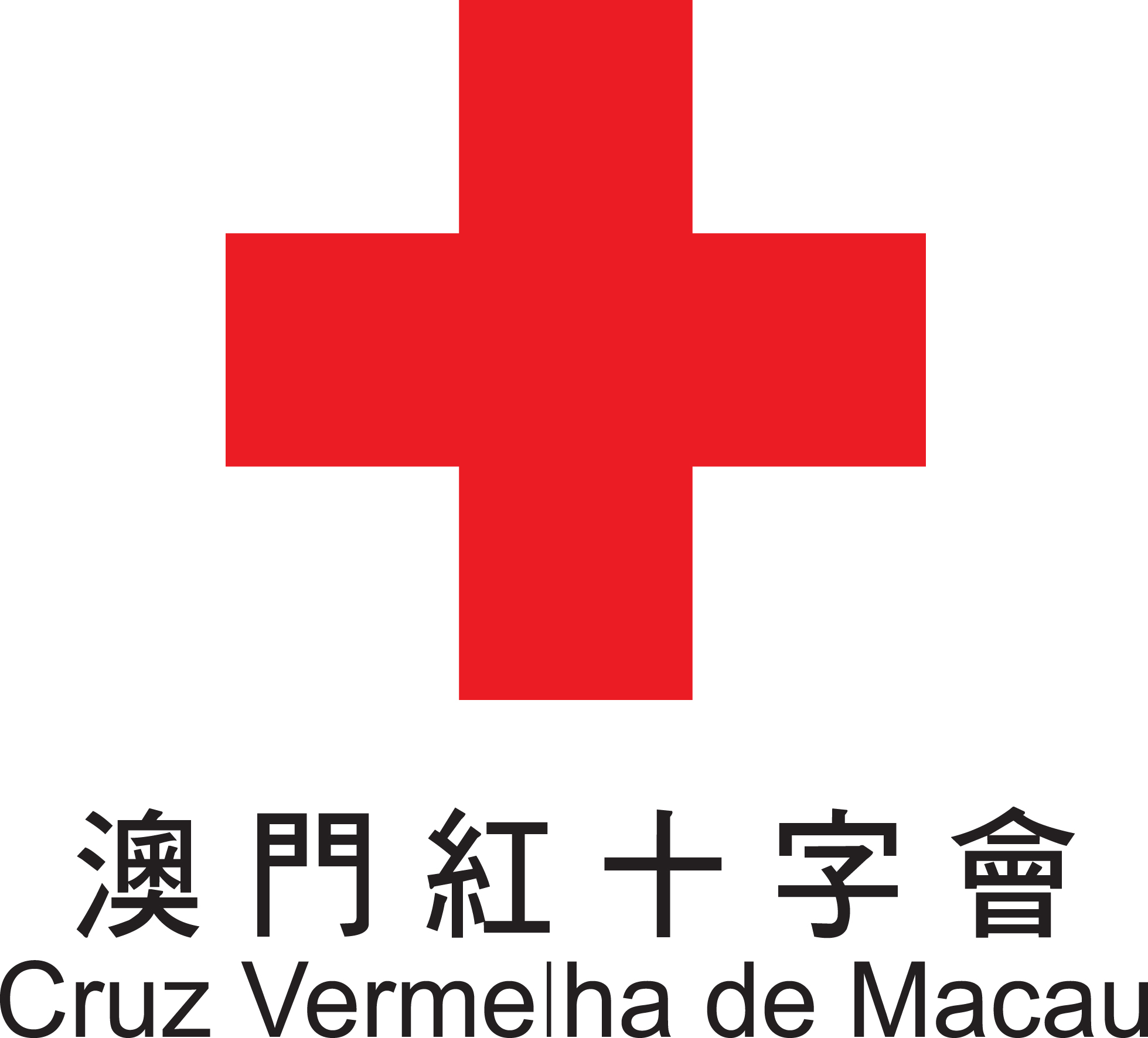

Chinese name
- Traditional Chinese: 澳門特別行政區紅十字會
- Simplified Chinese: 澳门特别行政区红十字会
Transcriptions
Standard Mandarin
- Hanyu Pinyin: Àomén Tèbiéxíngzhèngqū Hóngshízì Huì
Yue: Cantonese
- Jyutping: ou3 mun4*2 dak6 bit6 hang4 zing3 keoi1 hung4 sap6 zi6 wui6*2

Portuguese name
- Portuguese: Cruz Vermelha da Região Administrativa Especial de Macau

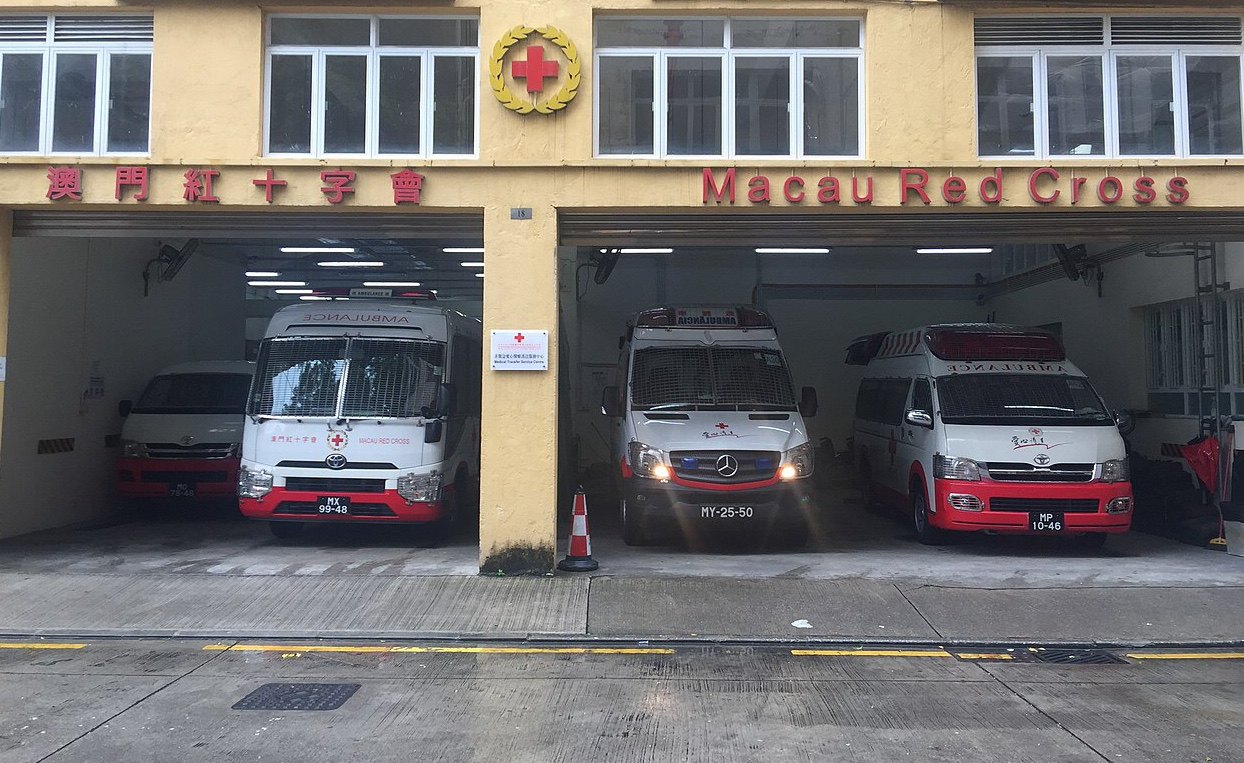
Medical Transfer Service Centre in Areia Preta, Nossa Senhora de Fátima

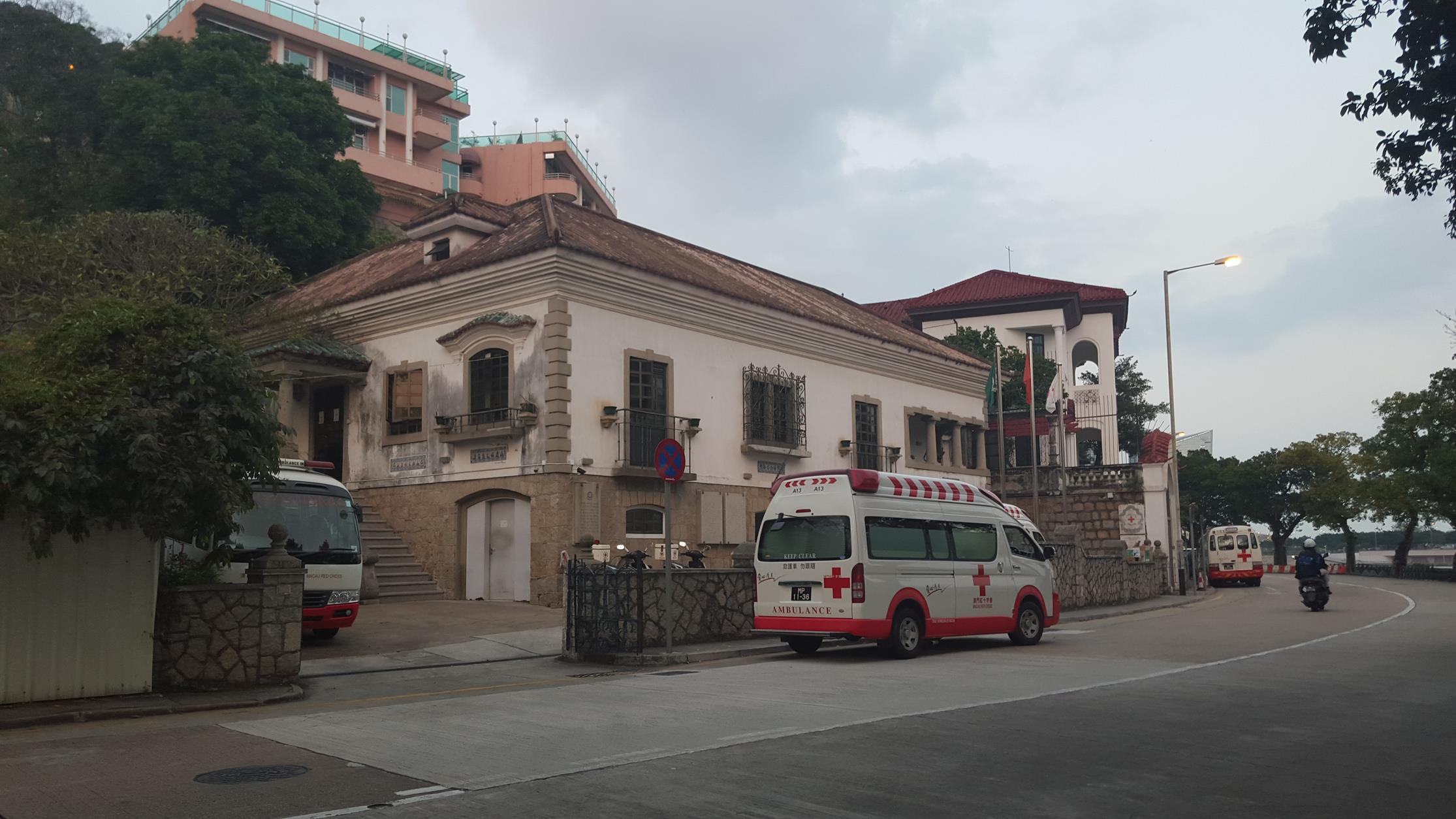
Former headquarters in São Lourenço

The Macau Red Cross (Portuguese: Cruz Vermelha Macau, Chinese: 澳門紅十字會) is a branch of the Red Cross in Macau. The headquarters is in the China Civil Plaza (中土大廈) in Sé. It also has a Medical Transfer Centre (醫療輔助服務中心) in the Edificio Industrial Hap Si (合時工業大廈) in Areia Preta, Nossa Senhora de Fátima.

It is the humanitarian organisation in the territory that has existed for the longest time.

The previous head office is in São Lourenço.

== History ==
The Portuguese Red Cross's presence in Macau began in 1920, and became established as a delegation in 1943. A chapter of the book The Red Cross Movement described the Macau Red Cross as "simultaneously, a local creation, a delegation integrated into a national/colonial context, an inter-imperial structure and part of a transnational institution with global reach." The Macau Red Cross left the Portuguese organisation and joined the Red Cross Society of China effective 20 December 1999.

It supports a school in Heba Town, Shiqian County, Tongren, Guizhou: Melco Crown-Macau Red Cross Bo-Ai Primary School (新濠博亚澳门红十字博爱小学). It first opened in 1964 and had its current facility open in 2017.

== Ambulance Fleet ==
Macau Red Cross operates a fleet of ambulances (MB Sprinter vans, Toyota Coaster minibuses, Toyota Hiace van) to supplement the fire service's amubulance fleet. Part of the fleet operates from Areia Preta Station.

=== Gallery ===
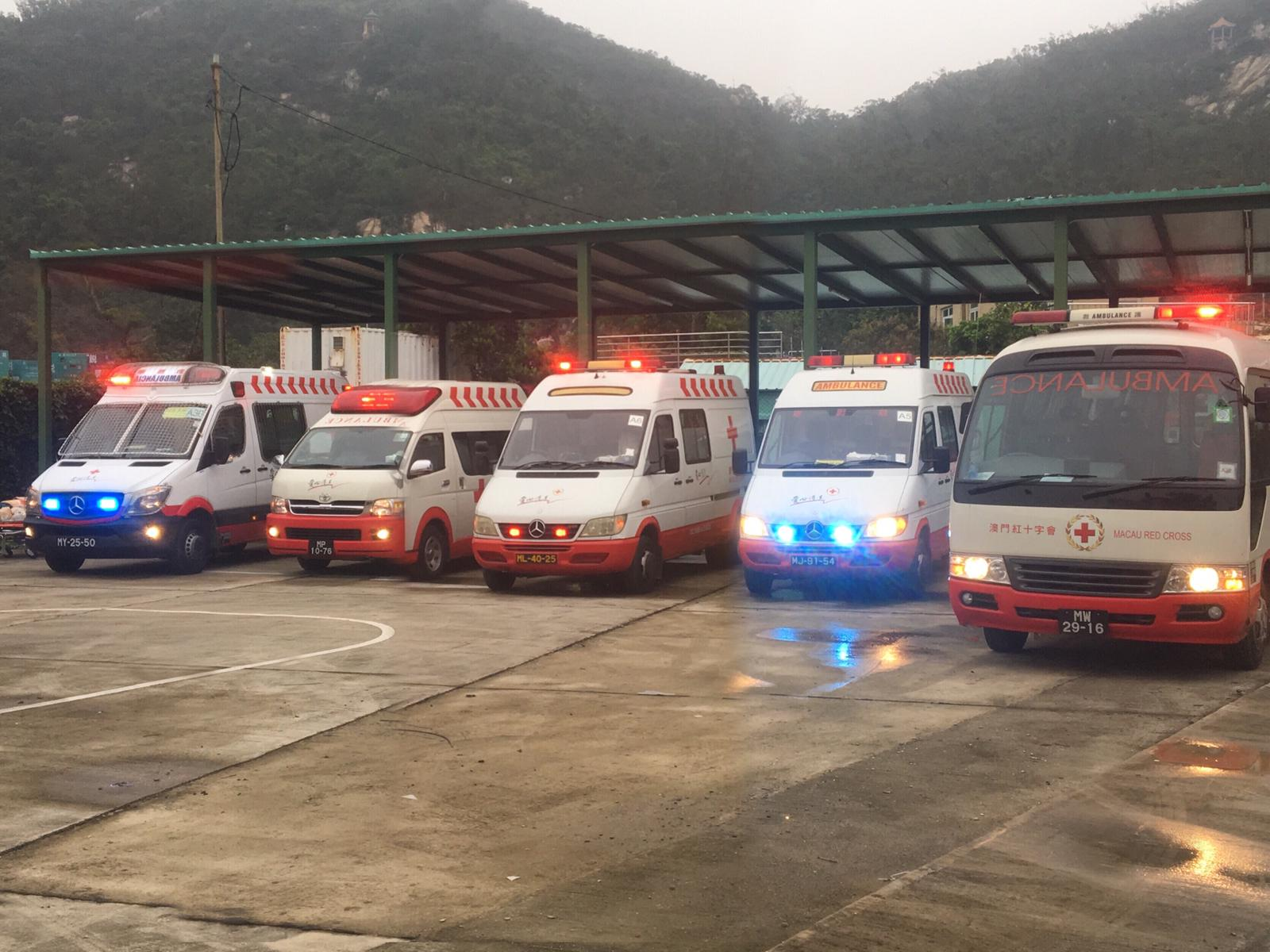
Red Cross ambulance fleet

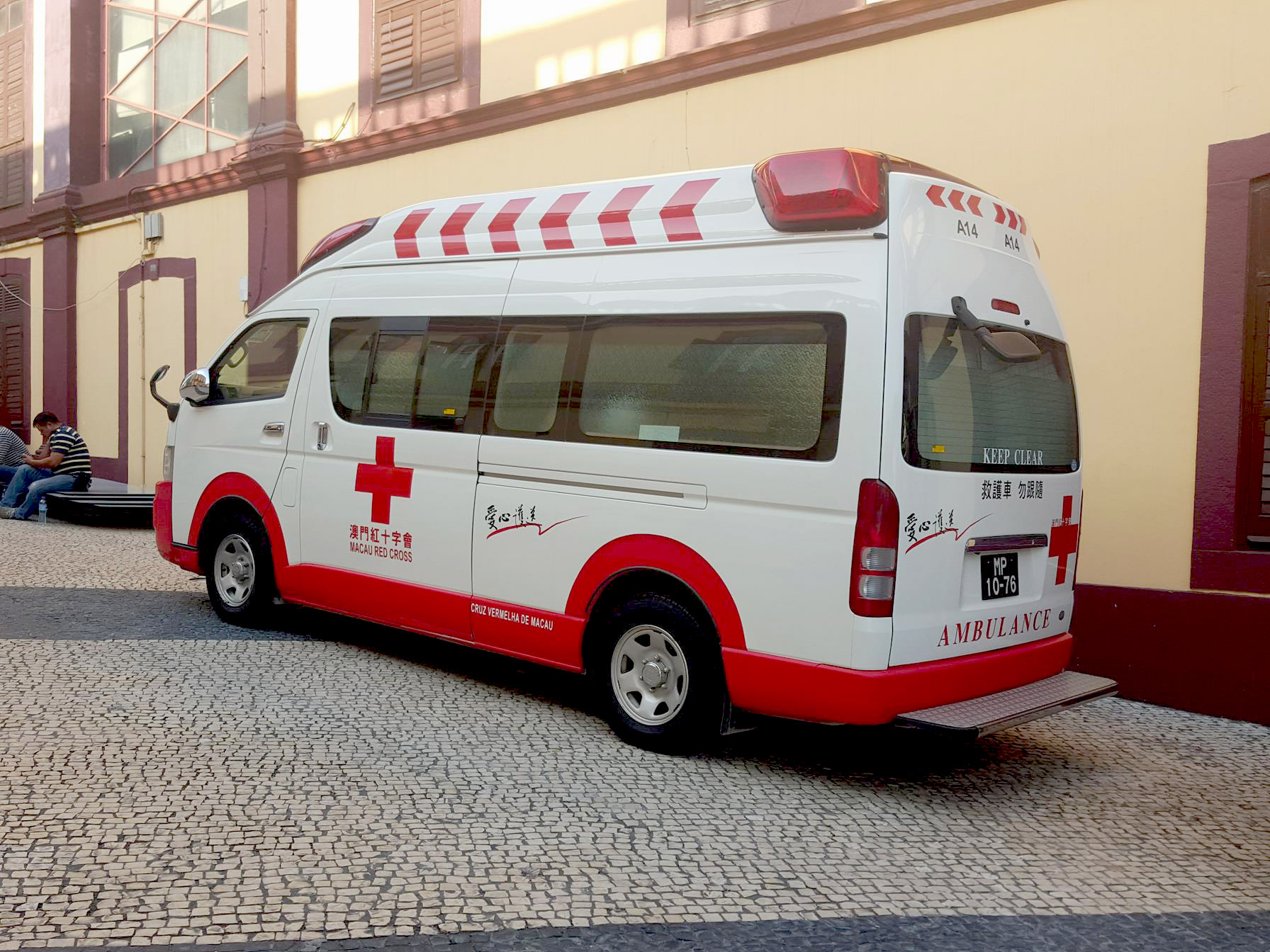
Red Cross Hiace van

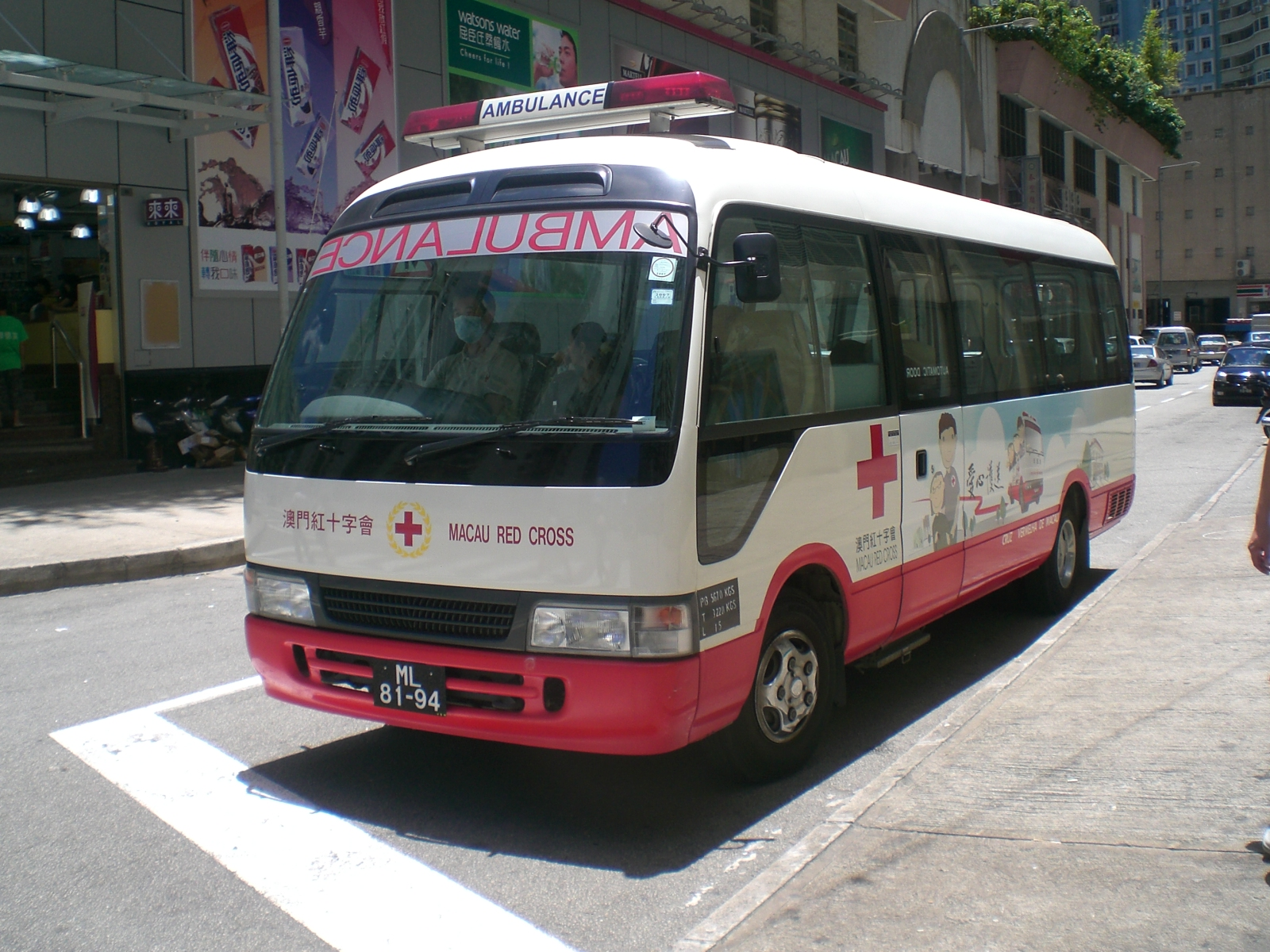
Red Cross Coaster minibus

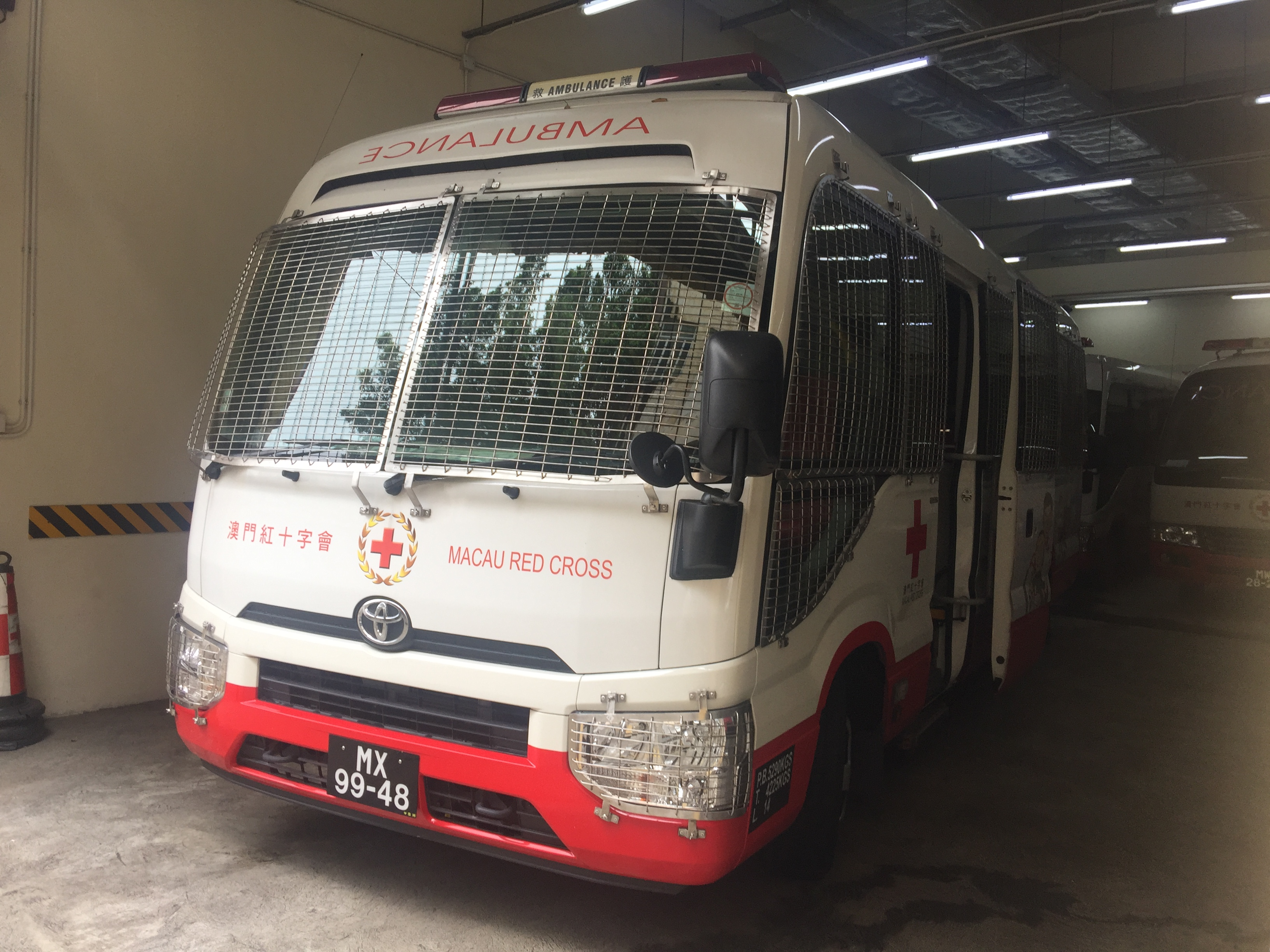
Red Cross Coaster minibus

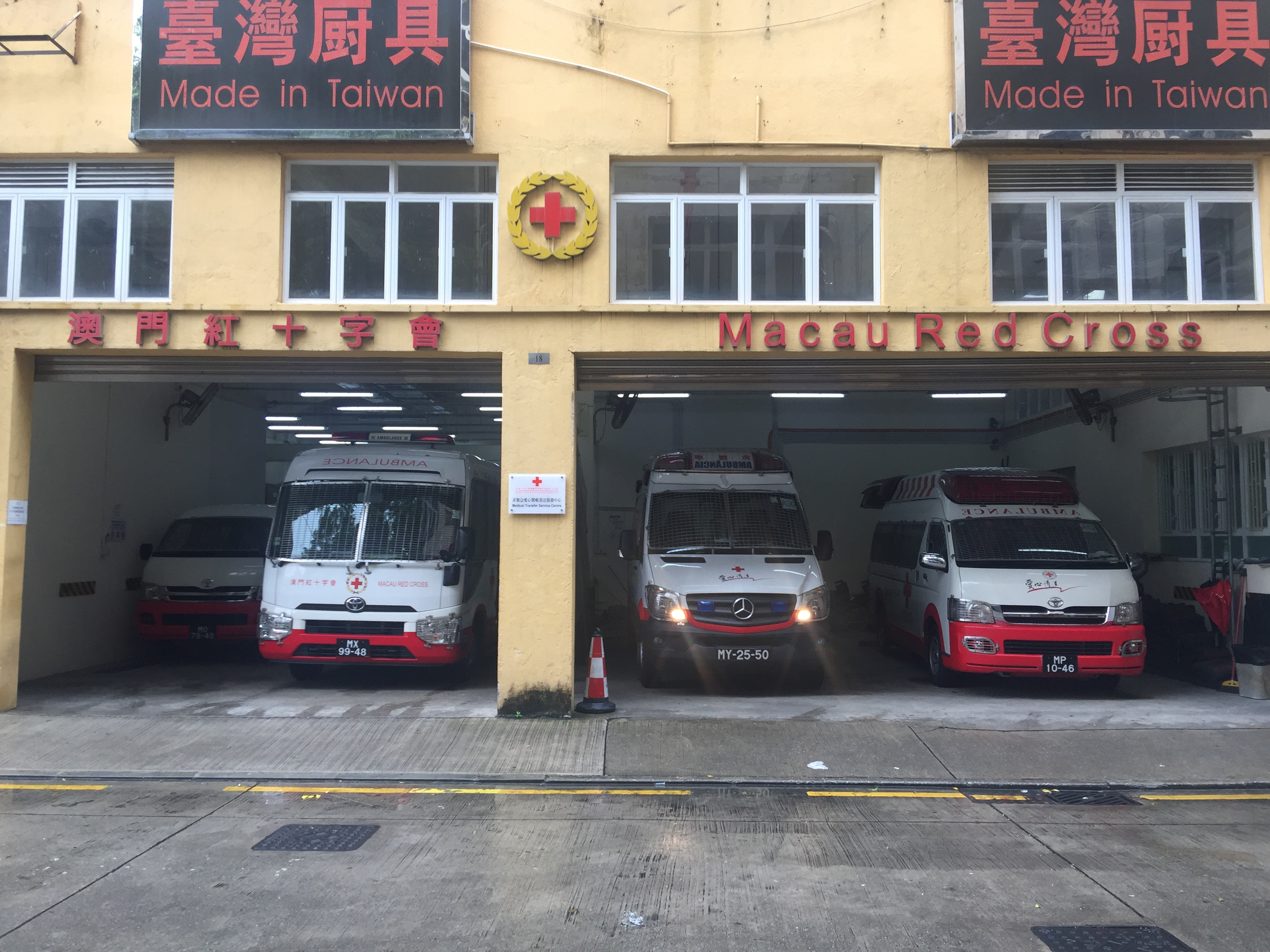
Red Cross Areia Preta ambulance depot
