= Pangu, Jiangxi =

Pangu 盘谷镇
- Town
- Location in Jiangxi Pangu (China)
- Coordinates: 27°25′58″N 115°0′24″E
- Country: People's Republic of China
- Province: Jiangxi
- Prefecture-level city: Ji'an
- County: Jishui County
- Time zone: UTC+8 (China Standard)

Pangu (simplified Chinese: 盘谷; traditional Chinese: 盤谷; pinyin: Pángǔ) is a town under the administration of Jishui County, Jiangxi, China. As of 2023, it administers Hongxian Residential Community (洪先社区) and the following fifteen villages:

- Laowu Village (老屋村)
- Tongjiang Village (同江村)
- Yangjiabian Village (杨家边村)
- Tanshanyuan Village (坛山园村)
- Youlian Village (友联村)
- Taiyuan Village (太元村)
- Xiaocixia Village (小祠下村)
- Zhanxi Village (湛溪村)
- Songcheng Village (松城村)
- Xiashilai Village (下石濑村)
- Shangzengjia Village (上曾家村)
- Nitian Village (泥田村)
- Beiling Village (北岭村)
- Xiaju Village (下居村)
- Lingkou Village (岭口村)
