= Baishui, Jishui County =

Baishui Town 白水镇
- Town
- Interactive map of Baishui Town
- Coordinates: 27.0798°N 115.3640°E
- Country: China
- Province: Jiangxi
- Prefecture-level city: Ji'an
- County: Jishui County
- Time zone: UTC+8 (China Standard)

Baishui (Chinese: 白水镇; lit. 'white water') is a town in Jishui County, Ji'an City, Jiangxi.

It has 11,000 residents in an area of 102.8 square kilometres (39.7 sq mi).

== History ==
Before Liberation, the town was known as Baishui Township (白水乡).

In 1951 part of its territory was used to form the new township of Dongying (东营, meaning east camp). Seven years later, as the 2nd 5-year plan (AKA Great Leap Forward) got underway, the two territories were recombined as Dongying.

Baishui was created as a People's commune in 1972, by the addition to Dongying Commune of two production brigades—Hengchuan and Chanxi—originally in Qiubei Commune.

Though differing from its pre-Liberation form in these additions, Baishui was made back into a township in 1984. It has been a town since 1993.

== Administration ==
The town executive, CPC sub-branch and PSB sub-station (派出所, paichusuo) are in Baishui Neighbourhood (居委会, juweihui).

The town also runs 8 village committees:

- Xiache (下车)
- Shangdongying (上东营)
- Hongqiao (洪桥)
- Zhouxi (周溪)
- Xiadongying (下东营)
- Tuling (土岭)
- Chanxi (蝉溪)
- Hengchuan (横川)

== Produce ==
- Grains, Chinese chestnuts, shaddocks, tangerines, tea.

== See also ==
- List of township-level divisions of Jiangxi
