= Baisha, Gansu =

Baisha 白沙镇
- Town
- Location in Gansu
- Coordinates: 34°42′51″N 106°15′29″E
- Country: People's Republic of China
- Province: Gansu
- Prefecture-level city: Tianshui
- County: Qingshui County
- Time zone: UTC+8 (China Standard)

Baisha (Chinese: 白沙) is a town of Qingshui County, Gansu, China. As of 2018, it has 14 villages under its administration.
