= Baisha Subdistrict, Yangjiang =

Baisha Subdistrict 白沙街道
- Subdistrict
- Location in Guangdong
- Coordinates: 21°52′10″N 111°53′25″E
- Country: People's Republic of China
- Province: Guangdong
- Prefecture-level city: Yangjiang
- District: Jiangcheng District
- Time zone: UTC+8 (China Standard)

Baisha Subdistrict (Chinese: 白沙街道; pinyin: Báishā Jiēdào) is a subdistrict in Jiangcheng District, Yangjiang, Guangdong, China. As of 2018, it has one residential community and 12 villages under its administration.

== See also ==
- List of township-level divisions of Guangdong
