= Baisha, Leizhou =

Baisha 白沙镇
- Town
- Location in Guangdong
- Coordinates: 20°54′1″N 110°3′19″E
- Country: People's Republic of China
- Province: Guangdong
- Prefecture-level city: Zhanjiang
- County-level city: Leizhou
- Time zone: UTC+8 (China Standard)

Baisha (Chinese: 白沙) is a town of Leizhou, Guangdong, China. As of 2018, it has 27 villages under its administration.
