= Baisha, Yingde =

Baisha 白沙镇
- Town
- Location in Guangdong
- Coordinates: 24°5′42″N 113°45′33″E
- Country: People's Republic of China
- Province: Guangdong
- Prefecture-level city: Qingyuan
- County-level city: Yingde
- Time zone: UTC+8 (China Standard)

Baisha (Chinese: 白沙) is a town of Yingde, Guangdong, China. As of 2018, it has one residential community and 10 villages under its administration.
