= Baisha, Xinluo District =

Baisha 白沙镇
- Town
- Location in Fujian Baisha (China)
- Coordinates: 25.3843°N 117.2314°E
- Country: People's Republic of China
- Province: Fujian
- Prefecture-level city: Longyan
- District: Xinluo District
- Time zone: UTC+8 (China Standard)

Baisha (Chinese: 白沙) is a town in Xinluo District, Longyan, Fujian, China. As of 2018, it has 31 villages under its administration.
