= Ganyue Expressway =

Road in China

The Ganyue Expressway (Chinese: 赣粤高速公路) was built in 2004. It connects Jiangxi province and Guangdong province.

It is operated by the Jiangxi Ganyue Expressway Co., Ltd.
