= Baisha Township, Guizhou =

Baisha Township 白沙乡
- township
- Location in China
- Coordinates: 25°55′18″N 105°2′50″E
- Country: People's Republic of China
- Province: Guizhou
- Autonomous prefecture: Qianxinan Buyei and Miao Autonomous Prefecture
- County: Pu'an County
- Time zone: UTC+8 (China Standard)

Baisha Township (Chinese: 白沙乡; pinyin: Báishā Xiāng) is a township in Pu'an County, Guizhou province, China. As of 2018, it has one residential community and 4 villages under its administration.

== See also ==
- List of township-level divisions of Guizhou
