= Baisha, Wanyuan =

Baisha 白沙镇
- Town
- Location in Sichuan
- Coordinates: 31°58′12″N 108°9′47″E
- Country: People's Republic of China
- Province: Sichuan
- Prefecture-level city: Dazhou
- County-level city: Wanyuan
- Time zone: UTC+8 (China Standard)

Baisha (Chinese: 白沙) is a town of Wanyuan, Sichuan, China. As of 2018, it has two residential communities and 10 villages under its administration.

== See also ==
- List of township-level divisions of Sichuan
