= Baisha, Jiangxi =

Baisha 白沙镇
- Town
- Location in China
- Coordinates: 26°57′12″N 115°26′8″E
- Country: People's Republic of China
- Province: Jiangxi
- Prefecture-level city: Ji'an
- County: Jishui County
- Time zone: UTC+8 (China Standard)

Baisha (Chinese: 白沙) is a town of Jishui County, Jiangxi, China. As of 2018, it has one residential community and 14 villages under its administration.

== See also ==
- List of township-level divisions of Jiangxi
