= Yichuan County, Henan =

Yichuan County 伊川县 Ichwan
- County
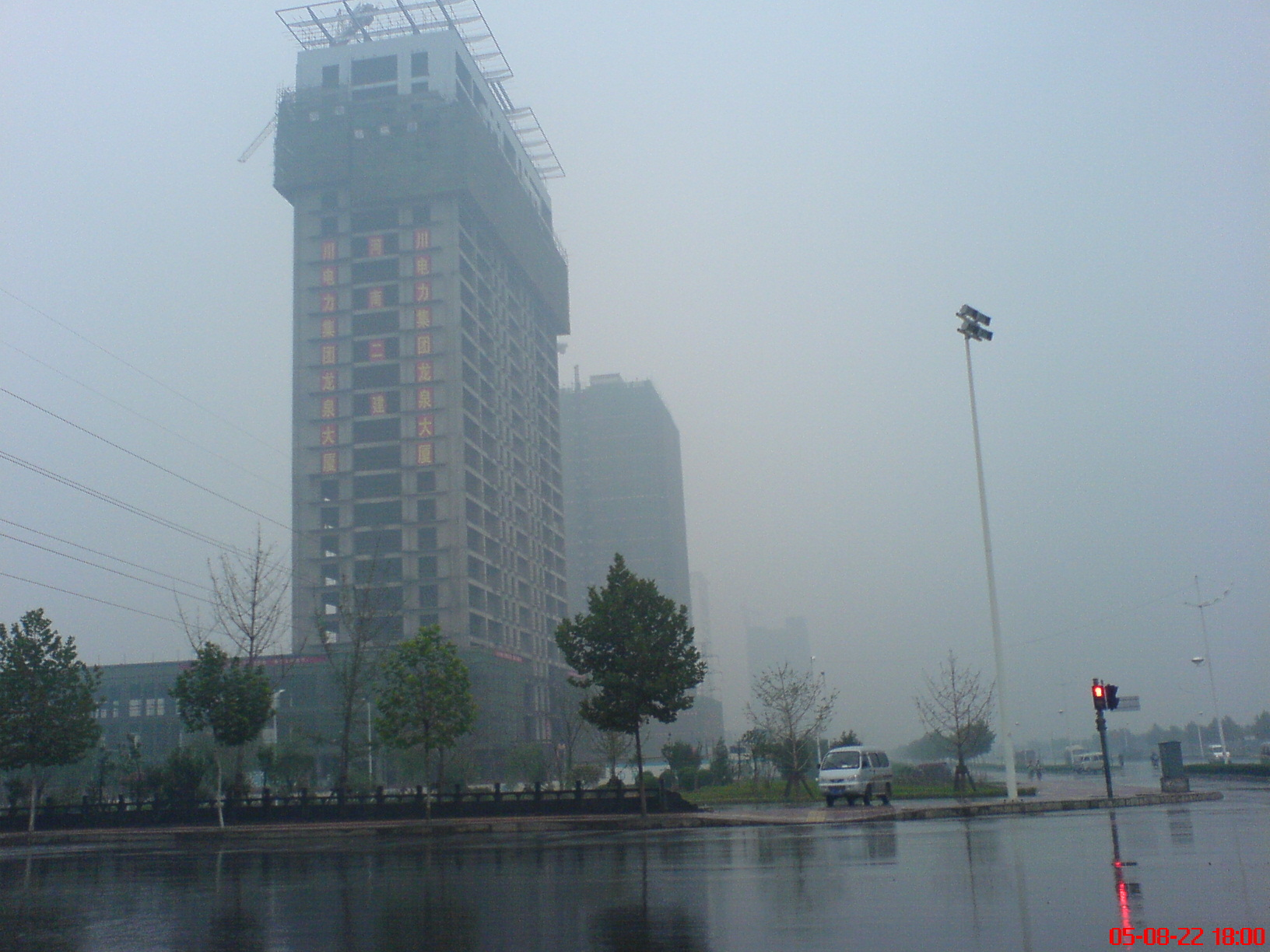

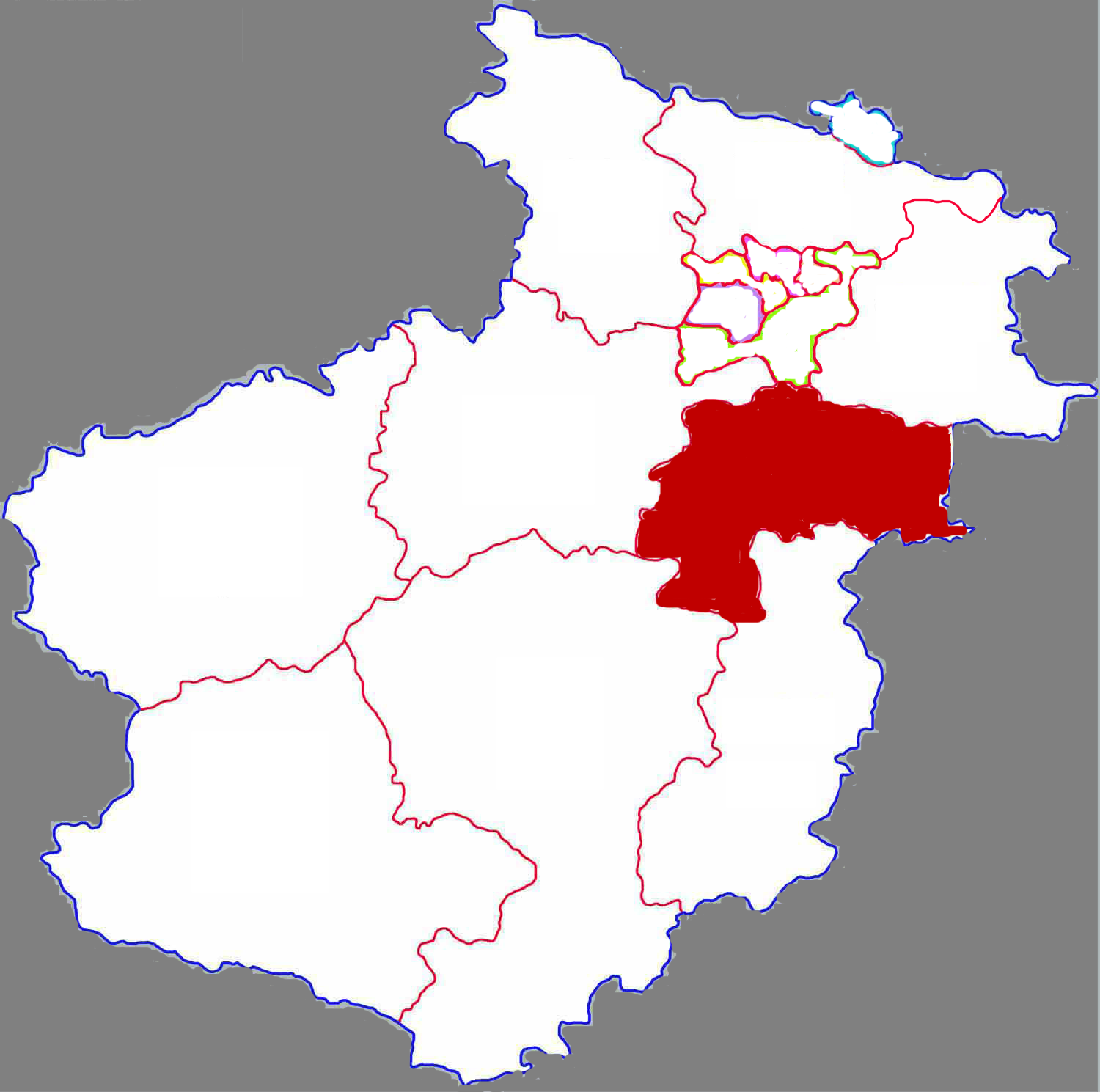
- Yichuan in Luoyang

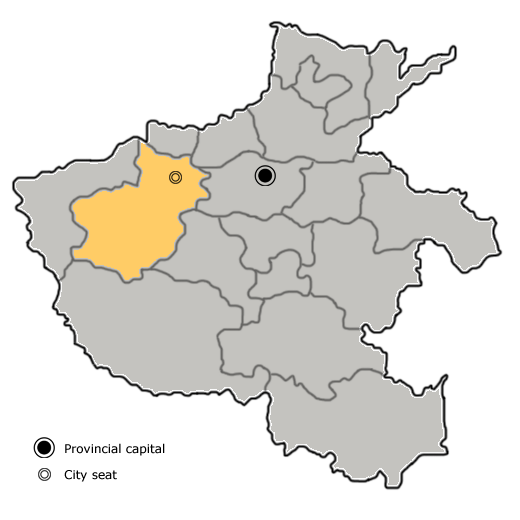
- Luoyang in Henan
- Coordinates: 34.5278°N 112.057°E
- Country: People's Republic of China
- Province: Henan
- Prefecture-level city: Luoyang

Area
  - Total: 1,243 km^{2} (480 sq mi)

Population (2019)
  - Total: 792,800
  - Density: 637.8/km^{2} (1,652/sq mi)
- Time zone: UTC+8 (China Standard)

Yichuan County (Chinese: 伊川县; pinyin: Yīchuān Xiàn) is a county in the west of Henan province, China. It is under the administration of the prefecture-level city of Luoyang.

Yichuan is known as the "City of Wine". Chinese rice wine is claimed to have been invented here by Dukang during the reign of Shaokang of the Xia. Dukang wine is now exported to Japan, the United States, Canada, Thailand, and more than 45 other countries.

== Administrative divisions ==
As of 2012, this county is divided to 5 towns and 9 townships.

Towns

- Chengguan (城关镇)
- Minggao (鸣皋镇)
- Shuizhai (水寨镇)
- Pengpo (彭婆镇)
- Gaoshan (高山镇)

Townships

- Yaling Township (鸦岭乡)
- Pingdeng Township (平等乡)
- Jiuhou Township (酒后乡)
- Gezhai Township (葛寨乡)
- Baiyuan Township (白元乡)
- Baisha Township (白沙乡)
- Banpo Township (半坡乡)
- Jiangzuo Township (江左乡)
- Lüdian Township (吕店乡)

== Climate ==
Climate data for Yichuan, elevation 252 m (827 ft), (1991–2020 normals, extremes 1981–2010)
Month	Jan	Feb	Mar	Apr	May	Jun	Jul	Aug	Sep	Oct	Nov	Dec	Year
Record high °C (°F)	21.4 (70.5)	24.7 (76.5)	32.4 (90.3)	39.1 (102.4)	40.3 (104.5)	43.2 (109.8)	42.0 (107.6)	40.7 (105.3)	39.5 (103.1)	34.3 (93.7)	29.3 (84.7)	23.0 (73.4)	43.2 (109.8)
Mean daily maximum °C (°F)	6.3 (43.3)	9.6 (49.3)	17.3 (63.1)	23.6 (74.5)	28.4 (83.1)	31.9 (89.4)	33.0 (91.4)	31.8 (89.2)	26.7 (80.1)	21.1 (70.0)	13.9 (57.0)	8.4 (47.1)	21.0 (69.8)
Daily mean °C (°F)	0.3 (32.5)	3.2 (37.8)	10.2 (50.4)	16.2 (61.2)	21.4 (70.5)	25.4 (77.7)	27.3 (81.1)	26.0 (78.8)	20.9 (69.6)	15.0 (59.0)	8.3 (46.9)	2.3 (36.1)	14.7 (58.5)
Mean daily minimum °C (°F)	−4.4 (24.1)	−2.0 (28.4)	3.8 (38.8)	9.2 (48.6)	14.4 (57.9)	19.2 (66.6)	22.4 (72.3)	21.4 (70.5)	16.1 (61.0)	9.8 (49.6)	3.6 (38.5)	−2.6 (27.3)	9.2 (48.6)
Record low °C (°F)	−15.8 (3.6)	−15.6 (3.9)	−7.2 (19.0)	−1.7 (28.9)	4.6 (40.3)	12.0 (53.6)	16.5 (61.7)	13.5 (56.3)	7.7 (45.9)	−1.6 (29.1)	−7.4 (18.7)	−9.3 (15.3)	−15.8 (3.6)
Average precipitation mm (inches)	12.5 (0.49)	14.9 (0.59)	23.6 (0.93)	37.2 (1.46)	63.7 (2.51)	73.7 (2.90)	101.6 (4.00)	108.2 (4.26)	85.6 (3.37)	45.7 (1.80)	31.3 (1.23)	7.9 (0.31)	605.9 (23.85)
Average precipitation days (≥ 0.1 mm)	4.4	4.8	6.2	6.2	7.8	7.9	11.1	10.8	9.8	7.4	6.1	3.6	86.1
Average snowy days	4.3	3.5	1.4	0.2	0	0	0	0	0	0	1.2	2.9	13.5
Average relative humidity (%)	58	59	58	59	60	63	75	78	75	70	66	57	65
Mean monthly sunshine hours	128.6	131.5	172.3	194.8	206.7	186.7	170.0	161.5	145.3	144.9	133.2	134.7	1,910.2
Percentage possible sunshine	41	42	46	50	48	43	39	39	40	42	43	44	43
Source: China Meteorological Administration
