= Baisha, Hejiang County =

Baisha 白沙镇
- Town
- Location in Sichuan
- Coordinates: 28°55′17″N 105°45′8″E
- Country: People's Republic of China
- Province: Sichuan
- Prefecture-level city: Luzhou
- County: Hejiang County
- Time zone: UTC+8 (China Standard)

Baisha (Chinese: 白沙) is a town of Hejiang County, Sichuan, China. As of 2018, it has two residential communities and seven villages under its administration.
