= Baisha, Chengdu =

Baisha 白沙镇
- Town
- Location in Sichuan
- Coordinates: 30°27′57″N 104°9′2″E
- Country: China
- Province: Sichuan
- Prefecture-level city: Chengdu
- District: Shuangliu District
- Time zone: UTC+8 (China Standard)

Baisha (Chinese: 白沙) is a town of Shuangliu District, Chengdu, Sichuan, China. As of 2018, it has one residential community and 8 villages under its administration.

== See also ==
- List of township-level divisions of Sichuan
