= Baisha, Luoyang =

Baisha 白沙镇
- Town
- Location in Henan
- Coordinates: 34°22′55″N 112°31′28″E
- Country: People's Republic of China
- Province: Henan
- Prefecture-level city: Luoyang
- County: Yichuan County
- Time zone: UTC+8 (China Standard)

Baisha (Chinese: 白沙) is a town of Yichuan County, Henan, China. As of 2018, it has 26 villages under its administration.
