= Baisha, Shiqian County =

Baisha 白沙镇
- Town
- Location within Guizhou Location within China
- Coordinates: 27°29′7″N 108°1′41″E
- Country: People's Republic of China
- Province: Guizhou
- Prefecture-level city: Tongren
- County: Shiqian County
- Time zone: UTC+8 (China Standard)

Baisha (Chinese: 白沙) is a town of Shiqian County, Guizhou, China. As of 2018, it has 23 villages under its administration.

== See also ==
- List of township-level divisions of Guizhou
