= Yufeng District =

Yufeng 鱼峰区 · Yizfungh Gih
- District
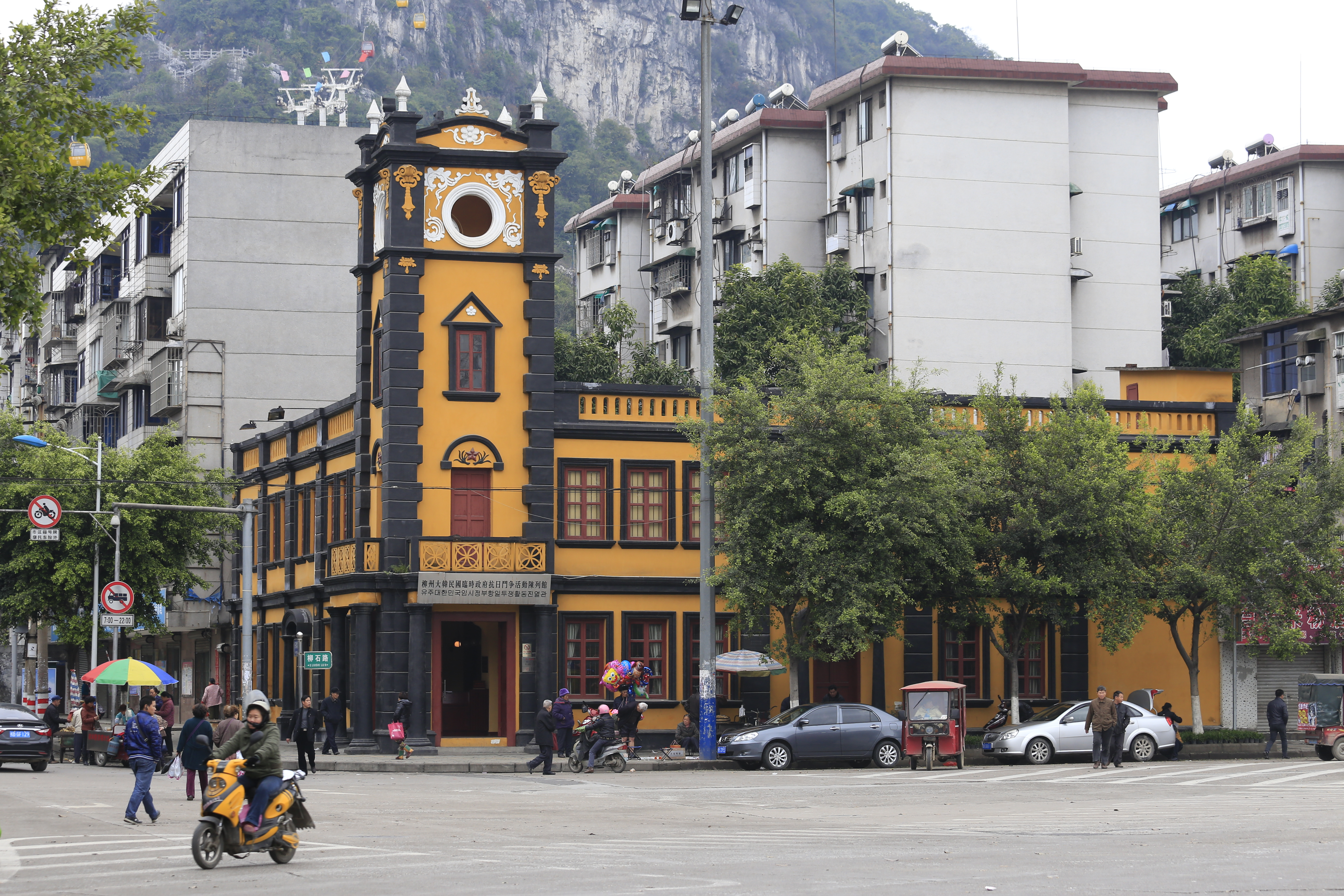

- Location in Guangxi
- Coordinates: 24°16′44″N 109°26′04″E
- Country: China
- Autonomous region: Guangxi
- Prefecture-level city: Liuzhou
- District seat: Qilin Subdistrict

Area
  - Total: 122 km^{2} (47 sq mi)

Population (2010)
  - Total: 356,296
  - Density: 2,920/km^{2} (7,560/sq mi)
- Time zone: UTC+8 (China Standard)

Yufeng District (simplified Chinese: 鱼峰区; traditional Chinese: 魚峰區; pinyin: Yúfēng Qū; Standard Zhuang: Yizfungh Gih) is one of four districts of Liuzhou, Guangxi Zhuang Autonomous Region, China.

== Administrative divisions ==
Yufeng District is divided into 8 subdistricts and 4 towns:

subdistricts

- Tianma 天马街道
- Jiahe 驾鹤街道
- Jianpanshan 箭盘山街道
- Wuliting 五里亭街道
- Rongjun 荣军街道
- Bailian 白莲街道
- Qilin 麒麟街道
- Yanghe 阳和街道

towns

- Luorong 雒容镇
- Luobu 洛埠镇
- Liyong 里雍镇
- Baisha 白沙镇
