= Shiqian County =

Shiqian County 石阡县
- County
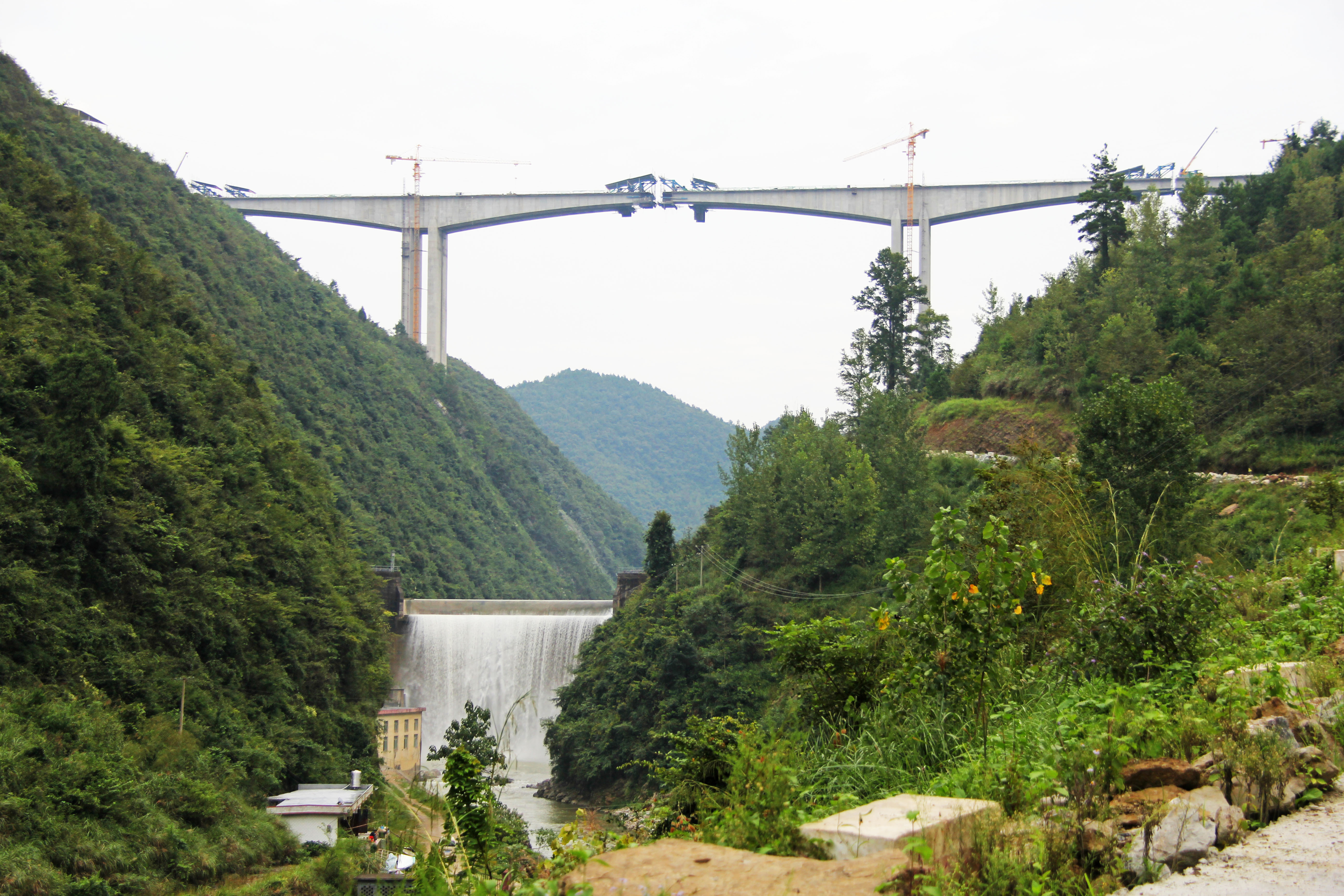

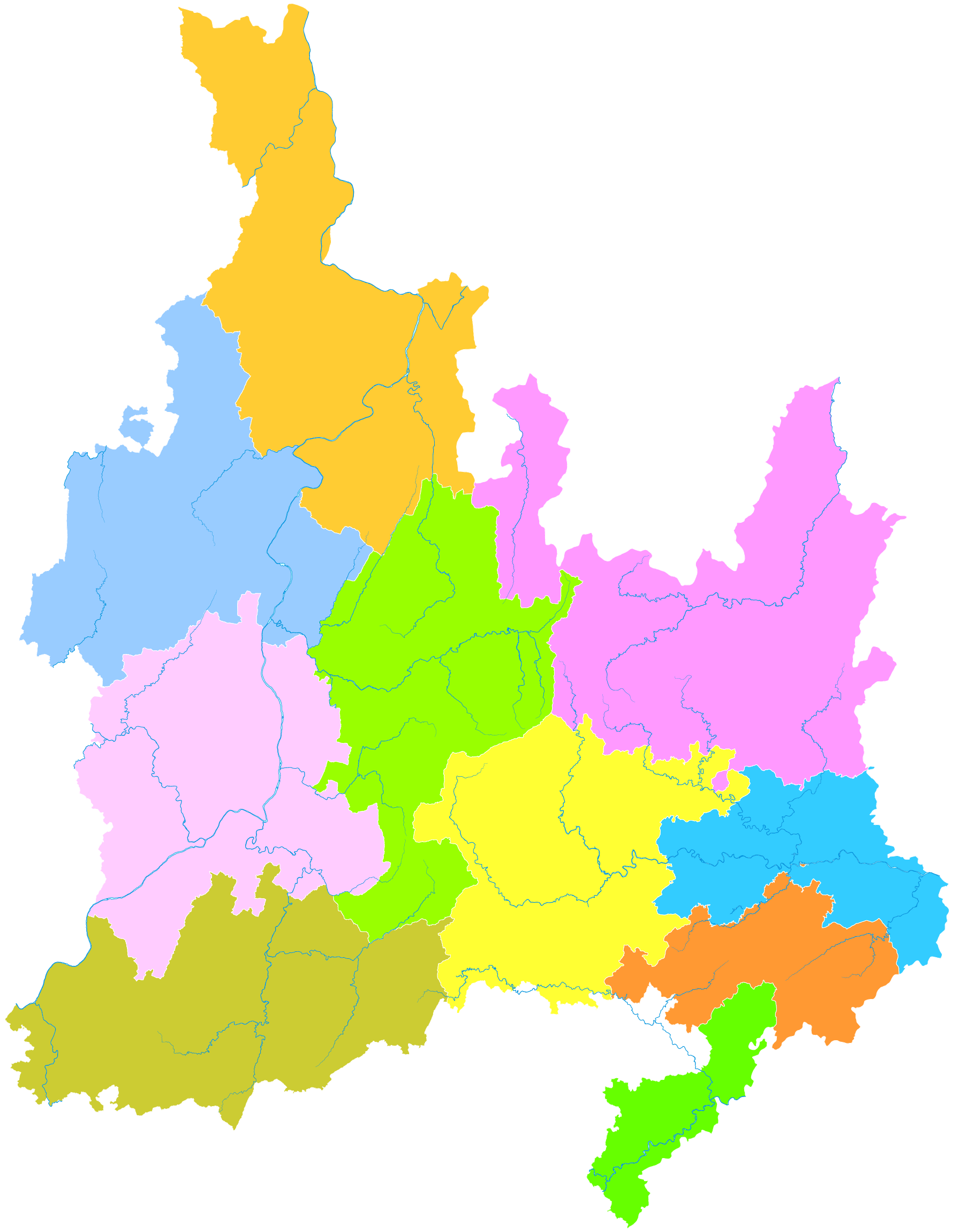
- Shiqian is the division located at the southwest corner of this map of Tongren

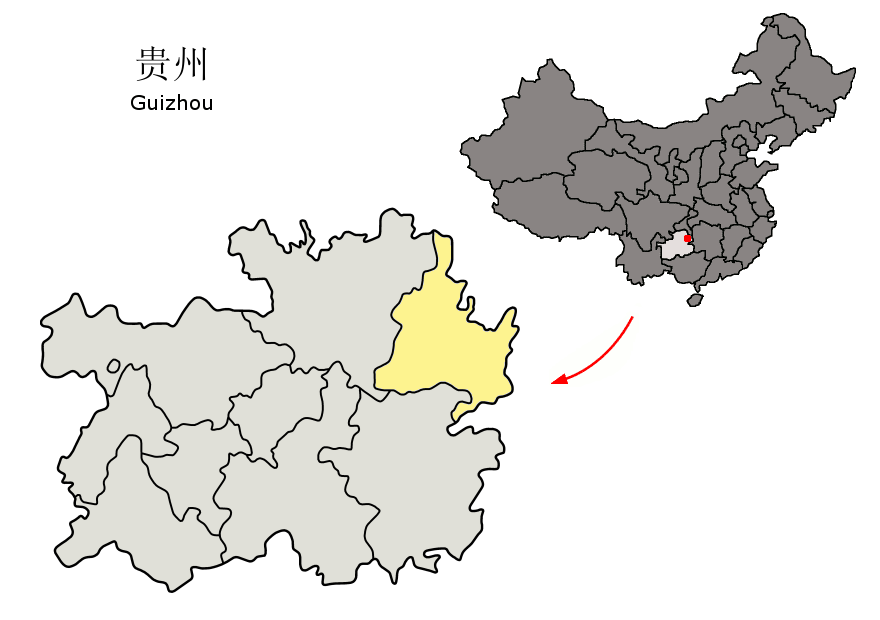
- Tongren in Guizhou
- Coordinates (Shiqian County government): 27°30′49″N 108°13′25″E
- Country: China
- Province: Guizhou
- Prefecture-level city: Tongren
- County seat: Tangshan

Area
  - Total: 2,172 km^{2} (839 sq mi)

Population (2010)
  - Total: 304,218
  - Density: 140.1/km^{2} (362.8/sq mi)
- Time zone: UTC+8 (China Standard)
- Postal code: 555100

Shiqian County (simplified Chinese: 石阡县; traditional Chinese: 石阡縣; pinyin: Shíqiān Xiàn) is a county under the administration of the prefecture-level city of Tongren, in the northeast of Guizhou Province, China. The government is located in Tangshan.

== Administrative divisions ==
Shiqian County is divided into 3 subdistricts, 6 towns, 1 township and 9 ethnic townships:

subdistricts

- Tangshan Subdistrict 汤山街道
- Quandu Subdistrict 泉都街道
- Zhongba Subdistrict 中坝街道

towns

- Benzhuang Town 本庄镇
- Baisha Town 白沙镇
- Longtang Town 龙塘镇
- Huaqiao Town 花桥镇
- Wude Town 五德镇
- Heba Town 河坝镇

township

- Guorong Township 国荣乡

ethnic townships

- Jufeng Gelao and Dong Ethnic Township 聚凤仡佬族侗族乡
- Longjing Gelao and Dong Ethnic Township 龙井侗族仡佬族乡
- Dashaba Gelao and Dong Ethnic Township 大沙坝仡佬族侗族乡
- Fengxiang Dong and Gelao Ethnic Township 枫香侗族仡佬族乡
- Qingyang Miao, Gelao and Dong Ethnic Township 青阳苗族仡佬族侗族乡
- Shigu Gelao and Dong Ethnic Township 石固仡佬族侗族乡
- Pingdi Gelao and Dong Ethnic Township 坪地场仡佬族侗族乡
- Ganxi Gelao and Dong Ethnic Township 甘溪仡佬族侗族乡
- Pingshan Gelao and Dong Ethnic Township 坪山仡佬族侗族乡

== Ethnic groups ==
The Shiqian County Gazetteer (1992) lists the following ethnic groups and their respective locations.

- Dong (pop. 61,259)
- Miao (pop. 14,257)
- Tujia (pop. 4,500)
  - Longtang (龙塘镇), Bailong (白龙乡), Huaqiao (花桥乡), Jufeng (聚凤乡)
- Yao (pop. 1,693)
  - Beita township (北塔乡): Leijiatun (雷家屯), Wuchaguan (乌茶关)
  - Huaqiao township (花桥乡): Shuiwei village (水尾村)
- Mongol (pop. 2,535)
  - Sunjiaping township (孙家坪乡), Longchuan district (龙川区): Yujiazhai (余家寨), Zhong Yujiazhai (中余家寨), Xia Yujiazhai (下余家寨), Dayanshan (大岩山)
  - Longdong township (龙洞乡): Dingjiaba (丁家坝)
  - Pingdichang township (坪地场乡): Leishoushan (雷首山)
  - Zhongkui township (中魁乡): Hexi Jiangpo (河西姜坡), Daping (大坪)
- Zhuang (pop. 585)
  - Zhongba (中坝区), Zhongkui (中魁乡), Tangshan (汤山镇)
- Buyi (pop. 447)
  - Longtang (龙塘区), Wan'an (万安乡), Tangshan (汤山镇), Juntian (均田乡)
- Qiang (pop. 623)
  - Wan'an (万安乡), Jufeng (聚凤乡), Tangshan (汤山镇), Shanzhuang (山庄镇)
- Hui (pop. 323)
  - Wan'an (万安乡), Zhongkui (中魁乡), Pingshan (坪山乡), Longtang (龙塘镇), Tangshan (汤山镇)
- Manchu (pop. 131)
  - Muzhuang (本庄镇), Tangshan (汤山镇)
- Yi (pop. 368)
  - Datun (大屯乡), Longdong (龙洞乡), Fuyan (扶堰乡), Baisha (白沙乡), Tangshan (汤山镇)

== Climate ==
Climate data for Shiqian, elevation 468 m (1,535 ft), (1991–2020 normals, extremes 1981–2010)
| Month | Jan | Feb | Mar | Apr | May | Jun | Jul | Aug | Sep | Oct | Nov | Dec | Year |
|---|---|---|---|---|---|---|---|---|---|---|---|---|---|
| Record high °C (°F) | 26.6 (79.9) | 33.3 (91.9) | 35.8 (96.4) | 35.4 (95.7) | 37.8 (100.0) | 36.8 (98.2) | 40.0 (104.0) | 39.0 (102.2) | 39.0 (102.2) | 35.7 (96.3) | 29.8 (85.6) | 24.5 (76.1) | 40.0 (104.0) |
| Mean daily maximum °C (°F) | 9.1 (48.4) | 12.3 (54.1) | 17.0 (62.6) | 22.8 (73.0) | 26.7 (80.1) | 29.3 (84.7) | 32.5 (90.5) | 32.5 (90.5) | 28.7 (83.7) | 22.5 (72.5) | 17.5 (63.5) | 11.4 (52.5) | 21.9 (71.3) |
| Daily mean °C (°F) | 5.9 (42.6) | 8.4 (47.1) | 12.4 (54.3) | 17.7 (63.9) | 21.6 (70.9) | 24.7 (76.5) | 27.2 (81.0) | 26.7 (80.1) | 23.2 (73.8) | 18.0 (64.4) | 13.2 (55.8) | 7.9 (46.2) | 17.2 (63.0) |
| Mean daily minimum °C (°F) | 3.7 (38.7) | 5.8 (42.4) | 9.3 (48.7) | 14.2 (57.6) | 18.0 (64.4) | 21.4 (70.5) | 23.4 (74.1) | 22.7 (72.9) | 19.6 (67.3) | 15.1 (59.2) | 10.4 (50.7) | 5.5 (41.9) | 14.1 (57.4) |
| Record low °C (°F) | −3.2 (26.2) | −2.5 (27.5) | −2.3 (27.9) | 3.8 (38.8) | 8.0 (46.4) | 13.9 (57.0) | 15.2 (59.4) | 15.8 (60.4) | 12.1 (53.8) | 6.0 (42.8) | 0.0 (32.0) | −3.3 (26.1) | −3.3 (26.1) |
| Average precipitation mm (inches) | 31.4 (1.24) | 30.6 (1.20) | 52.7 (2.07) | 107.9 (4.25) | 164.7 (6.48) | 206.3 (8.12) | 166.9 (6.57) | 125.0 (4.92) | 85.9 (3.38) | 92.4 (3.64) | 46.3 (1.82) | 26.9 (1.06) | 1,137 (44.75) |
| Average precipitation days (≥ 0.1 mm) | 13.4 | 11.9 | 14.1 | 16.2 | 17.8 | 16.4 | 13.5 | 12.1 | 10.6 | 14.6 | 10.4 | 10.7 | 161.7 |
| Average snowy days | 3.7 | 1.9 | 0.3 | 0 | 0 | 0 | 0 | 0 | 0 | 0 | 0 | 1.4 | 7.3 |
| Average relative humidity (%) | 78 | 76 | 77 | 79 | 80 | 82 | 77 | 78 | 78 | 82 | 80 | 78 | 79 |
| Mean monthly sunshine hours | 31.8 | 42.4 | 64.0 | 87.4 | 99.8 | 95.1 | 167.0 | 171.9 | 119.3 | 78.4 | 67.5 | 46.6 | 1,071.2 |
| Percentage possible sunshine | 10 | 13 | 17 | 23 | 24 | 23 | 40 | 43 | 33 | 22 | 21 | 14 | 24 |
Source: China Meteorological Administration

== Education ==
The Macau Red Cross supports a school in Heba Town, Shiqian County: Melco Crown-Macau Red Cross Bo-Ai Primary School (新濠博亚澳门红十字博爱小学). It first opened in 1964 and had its current facility open in 2017.
