= Baisha Subdistrict, Jiangmen =

Baisha Subdistrict 白沙街道
- Subdistrict
- Location in Guangdong
- Coordinates: 22°34′27″N 113°4′18″E
- Country: People's Republic of China
- Province: Guangdong
- Prefecture-level city: Jiangmen
- District: Pengjiang District
- Time zone: UTC+8 (China Standard)

Baisha Subdistrict (Chinese: 白沙街道; pinyin: Báishā Jiēdào) is a subdistrict in Pengjiang District, Jiangmen, Guangdong, China. As of 2018, it has 52 residential communities under its administration.

== See also ==
- List of township-level divisions of Guangdong
