= Xie Jin (painter) =

Chinese landscape painter and calligrapher

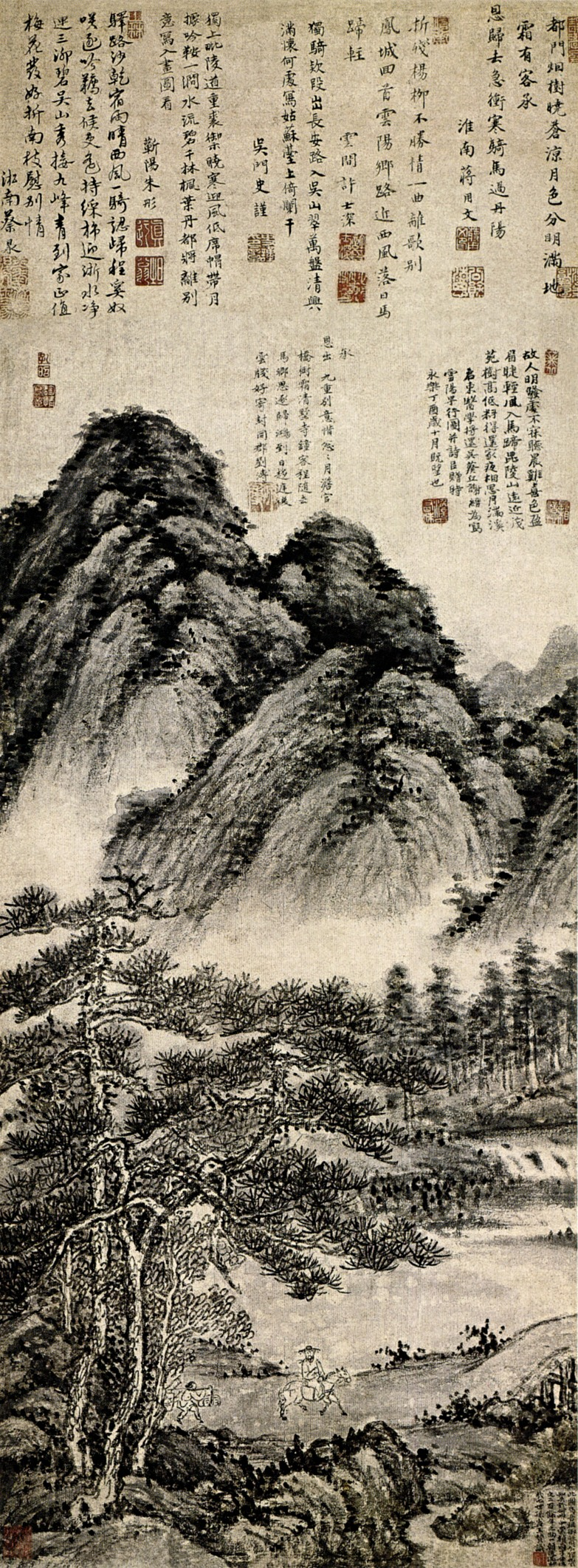
Xie Jin, Traveling Early in Clouds and Sun, Shanghai Museum

Xie Jin (Chinese: 謝縉, 1355–1430) was a Chinese landscape painter and calligrapher during the Ming Dynasty (1368–1644).

Xie was also known by other names: 'Kongzhao' (孔昭), 'Kuiyin' (葵印), 'Dieshan Xie' (謝疊山), and 'Tingsheng Lan' (蘭庭生). Some of his works can be found at the Shanghai Museum.

His The Dingshu Fishing Boat is the earliest extant Chinese folding fan painting.
