= Jin River Bridge =

Jin River Bridge 晋江大桥
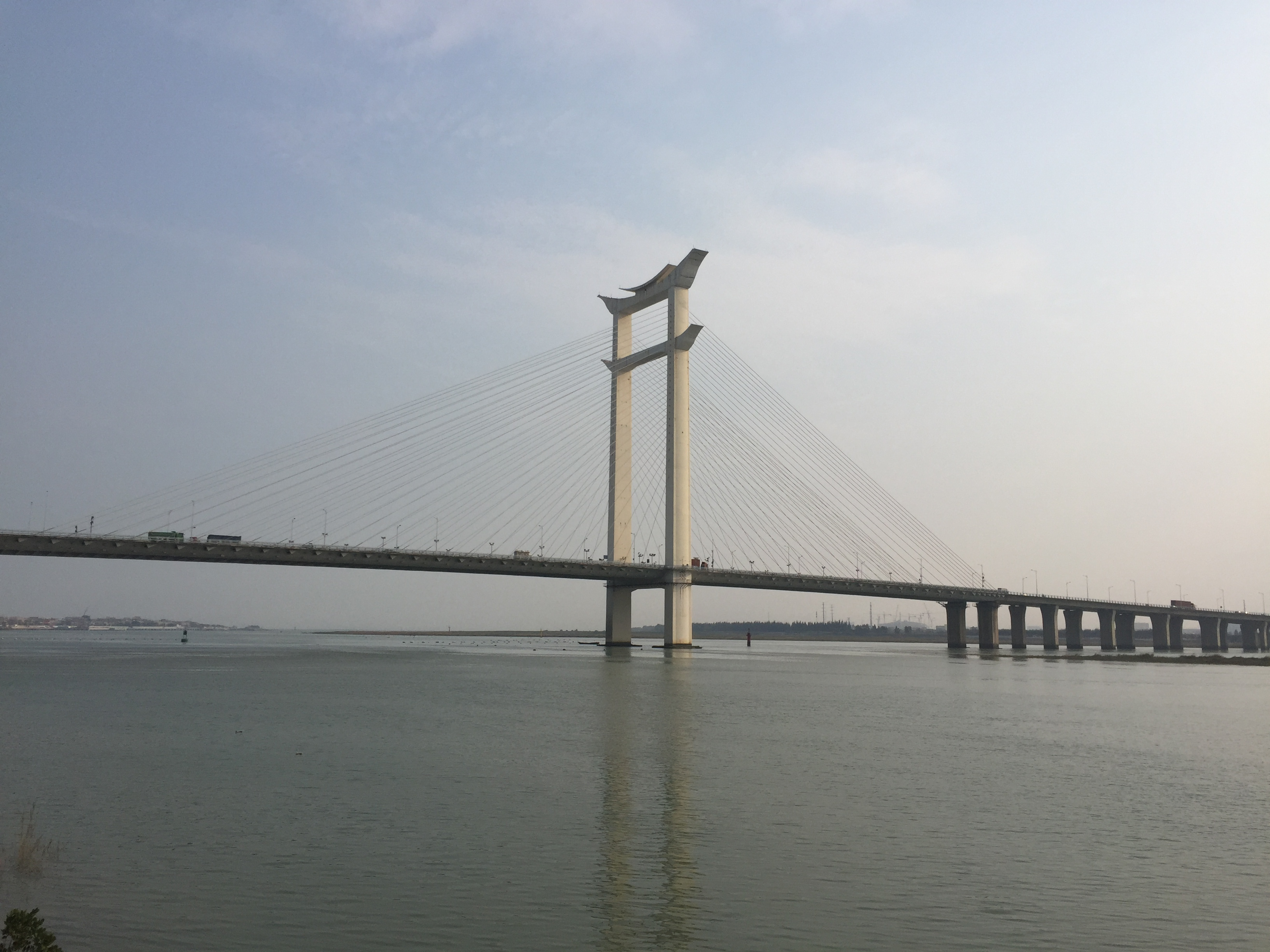
- Jin River Bridge in February 2019
- Coordinates: 24°52′06″N 118°38′18″E
- Carries: China National Highway 228 (Pedestrians, vehicles and bicycles)
- Crosses: Jin River
- Locale: Quanzhou/ Jinjiang, Fujian, China
- Preceded by: Chenzhou Bridge
- Followed by: Quanzhou Bay Bridge

Characteristics
- Design: Cable-stayed bridge
- Material: Prestressed concrete
- Total length: 2,740 metres (8,990 ft)
- Width: 38 metres (125 ft)
- Height: 132.125 metres (433.48 ft)
- Longest span: 200 metres (660 ft)
- Clearance below: 17.5 metres (57 ft)

History
- Designer: China Railway Bridge Survey and Design Institute
- Constructed by: China Railway Bridge Bureau Group; Fujian First Highway Engineering Company
- Construction start: May 8, 2005
- Construction end: October 15, 2008
- Construction cost: 880 million yuan
- Opened: 24 October 2008

Location
- Interactive map of Jin River Bridge

The Jin River Bridge (simplified Chinese: 晋江大桥; traditional Chinese: 晉江大橋; pinyin: Jìnjiāng Dàqiáo) is a cable-stayed bridge over the Jin River in Quanzhou/ Jinjiang, Fujian, China. The bridge measures 2,740 metres (8,990 ft) long, 38 metres (125 ft) wide, and approximately 132.125 metres (433.48 ft) high.

== History ==
The project of Jin River Bridge was officially started on 8 May 2005, completed and put into trial operation on 24 October 2008, with a total investment of about 880 million yuan.

== Gallery ==
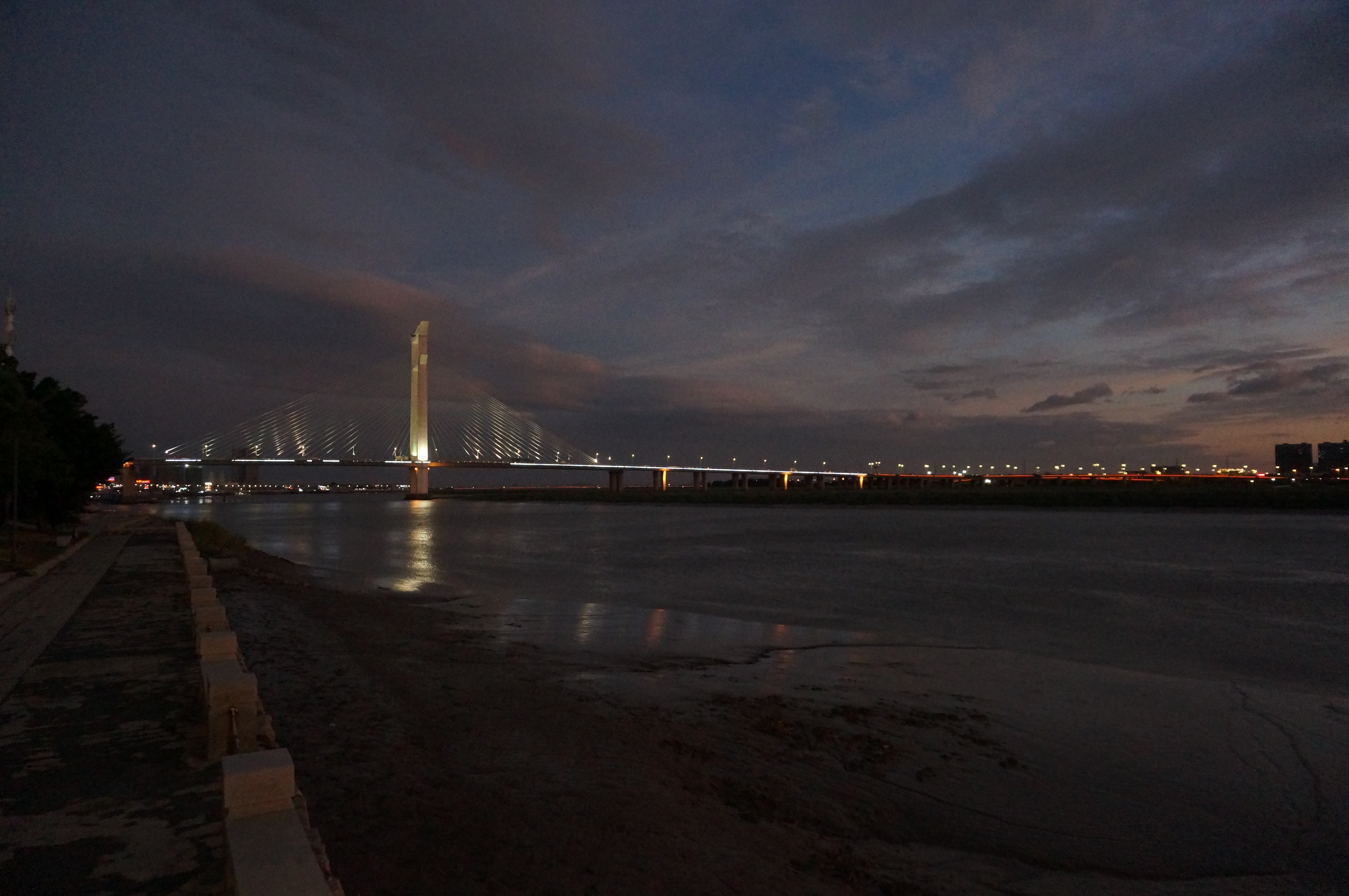
Jin River Bridge at night in September 2019

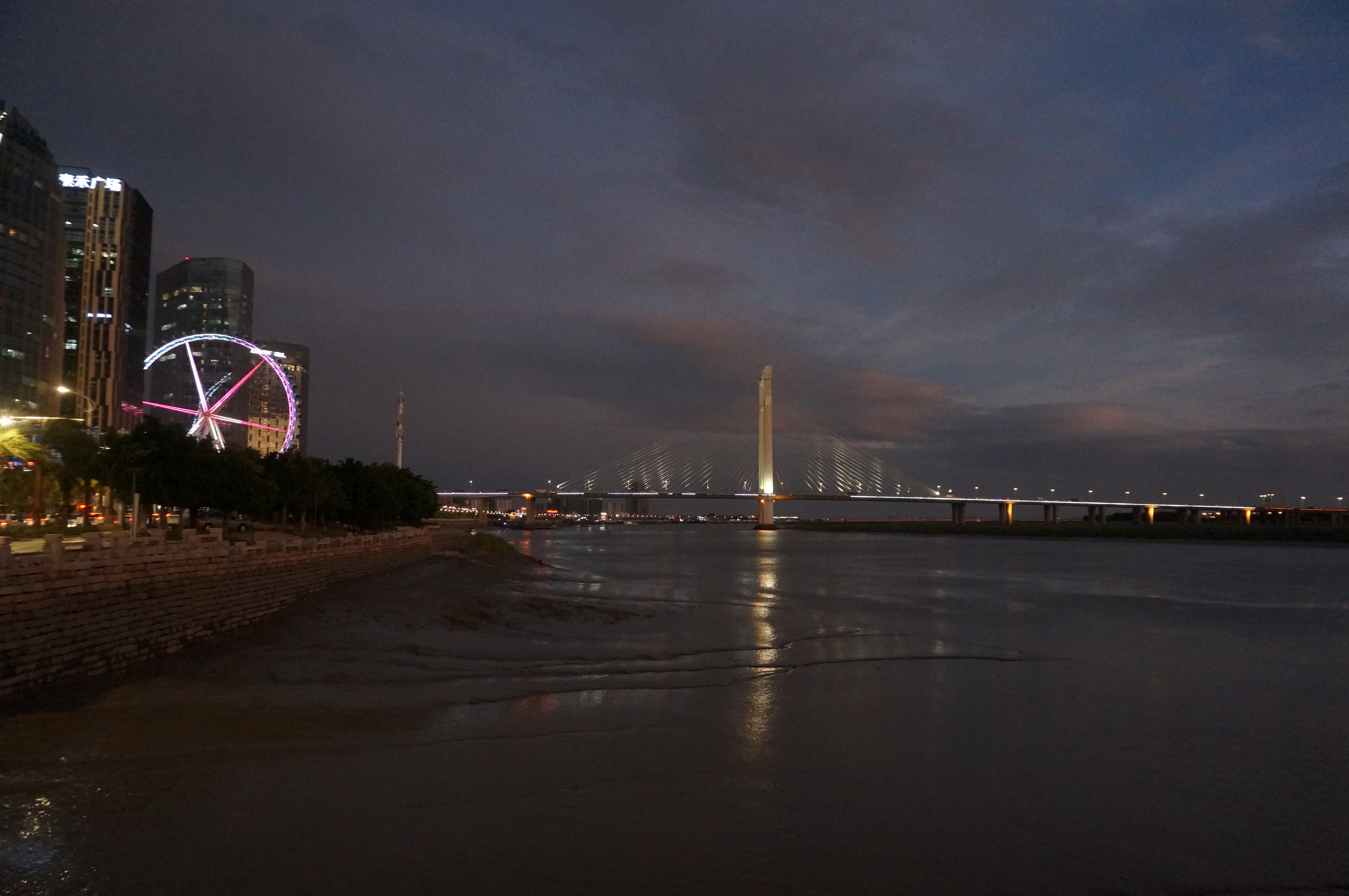
Jin River Bridge at night in September 2019

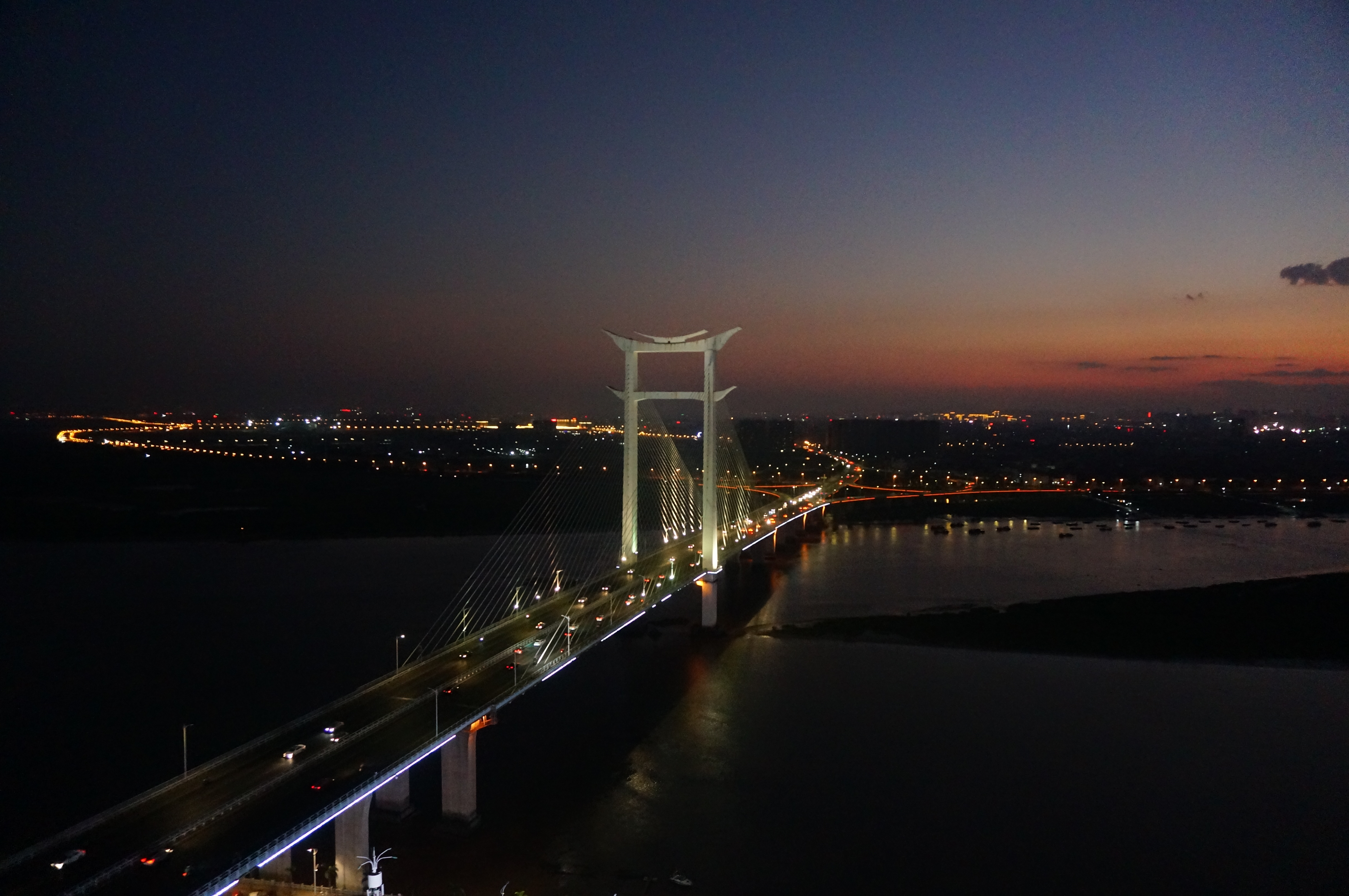
Jin River Bridge at night in September 2019
