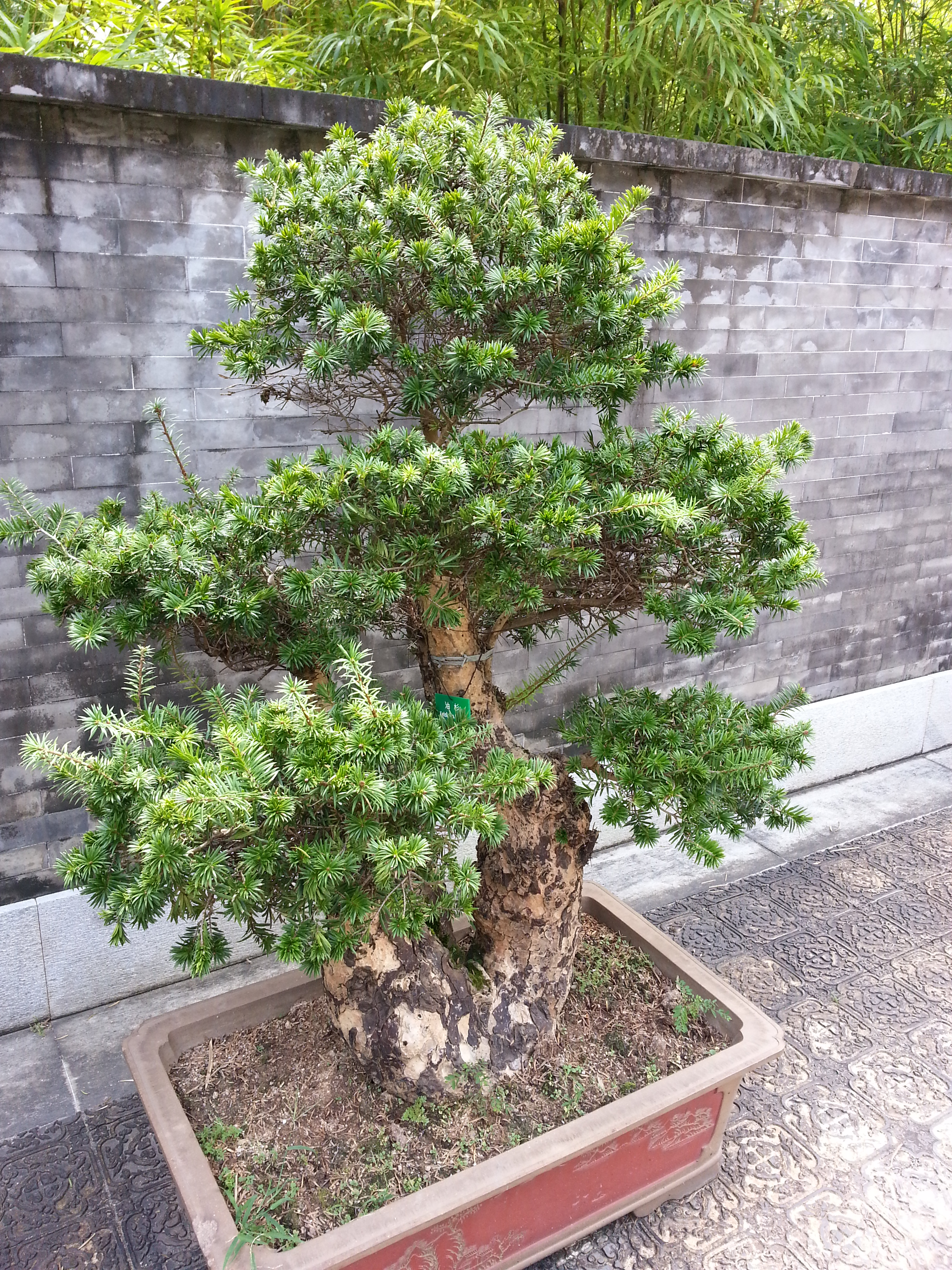

Conservation status
- Near Threatened (IUCN 3.1)

Scientific classification
- Kingdom: Plantae
- Clade: Tracheophytes
- Clade: Gymnosperms
- Division: Pinophyta
- Class: Pinopsida
- Order: Pinales
- Family: Pinaceae
- Genus: Keteleeria
- Species: K. fortunei

Binomial name
- Keteleeria fortunei (A. Murray) Carrière

= Keteleeria fortunei =

Species of conifer

Keteleeria fortunei (zh: 油杉, you shan) is a coniferous tree in the pine family, Pinaceae. Endemic to China, K. fortunei is an ancient relict species and a second-class national key protected plant, "mainly distributed in south subtropical to the middle subtropical edge". It is found in the provinces of Fujian, Guangdong, Guangxi, Guizhou, Hunan, Jiangxi, Yunnan, and Zhejiang. The tree grows in hills, mountains, and broadleaf forests at elevations of 200–1400 m. The lifespan of K. fortunei can reach more than a thousand years, and the height of a thousand-year-old tree can reach more than 40 meters. "Economically, K. fortunei is a treasure, and its comprehensive development and uses has broad prospects". The species is named after Scottish botanist Robert Fortune, who discovered the tree in 1844. K. fortunei has also been reported from Vietnam but this is attributed to misidentification of immature specimens of Pseudotsuga sinensis.

== Description ==
It grows 25–30 m tall and 1 m in trunk diameter at breast height, forming a pyramidal crown with spreading, horizontal branches. The bark is dark gray, rough, and furrowed in a vertical pattern. Branchlets are orange-red and pubescent when young, turning yellow-gray or yellow-brown in their second or third year. The leaves are 1.2–3 cm long by 2–4 mm broad, stiff, sharply pointed on young trees and rounded or rarely slightly notched on mature trees. They are shiny dark green above and pale green on the underside with 12-17 stomatal lines on each side of the midrib. The cones are cylindrical, 6–18 cm long, 3–5 cm wide before opening and up to 7.5 cm wide after opening. They stand erect on short pubescent stalks and mature in October to a purple-brown color. The cones open upon maturity to release the seeds, which are large and oblong, 1-1.3 cm long with a yellow-brown wedge-shaped wing 3 cm long.

== Uses ==
The tree is grown as an ornamental in warm climates, and the wood is used in construction and furniture, although the species is protected under Chinese forestry regulations.

"The ancients regarded K. fortunei as a mascot, and it was often placed around religious and sacrificial places such as Miao shrine and Ancestral shrine, which is why it suffered less man-made damage". Although the ancient forests of K. fortunei are not easy to see, there are still "古樹王/King of Ancient Trees" in many places, for example, in 2018, a 1,500-year-old tree located in Yongtai County, Fujian was selected "China's Most Beautiful Ancient Tree" (In 2018, a total of 85 trees won this honor).

== Protection ==
In Hong Kong, this species is under protection based on Forestry Regulations Cap. 96A.

In 1986, several researchers discovered some ancient K. fortunei stumps in good condition with an area of more than 30 km² in Shenhu Bay, Jinjiang, Fujian. "The maximum diameter of the stump is 100 cm, the minimum is 27 cm, and the depth of the buried part below the water surface can reach 20-25 meters". After identification, these stumps are more than 7,000 years old. In 1992, this rare natural relict in the world was officially designated by the State Council of China as "福建深沪湾海底古森林遗迹国家级自然保护区/National Nature Reserve of the Ancient Submarine Forest in Shenhu Bay, Fujian", which also protects a paleo oyster reef relict with a history of 9,000-25,000 years next to this ancient submarine forest. This nature reserve is of great value for the study of paleogeography, paleoplants, paleoclimatology, etc. in the sea area near Shenhu Bay.

In addition to the remains of the Ancient Submarine Forest in Shenhu Bay, the relics of K. fortunei have also been excavated in other places, such as a fossil about 70 million years ago unearthed near Xinyang and 罗山/Luoshan in Henan, a wooden slip of the Zhou dynasty unearthed in 沙市/Shashi, Hubei, and a 9,300-year-old wooden stem unearthed in Wuhan, Hubei.
