= Lingyuan (disambiguation) =

Lingyuan may refer to:

- Lingyuan, Liaoning, city in Liaoning, China
- Lingyuan Subdistrict, in Jinjiang, Fujiang, China
- Chu Lingyuan (褚靈媛) (384–436), last empress of Jin Dynasty in China
- Lingyuan, Wenquan, Yingshan County, Huanggang, Hubei
