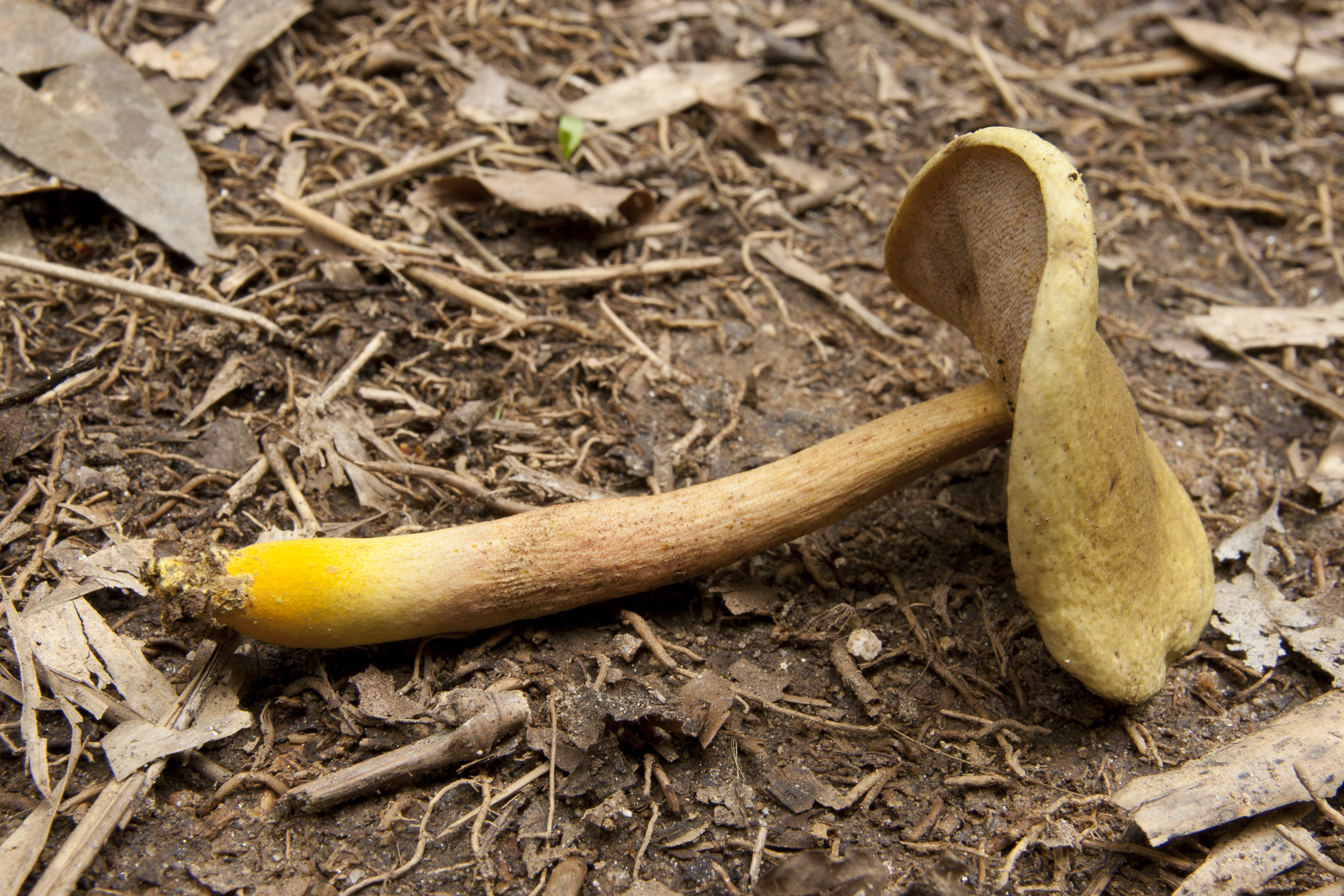

Scientific classification
- Kingdom: Fungi
- Division: Basidiomycota
- Class: Agaricomycetes
- Order: Boletales
- Family: Boletaceae
- Genus: Tylopilus
- Species: T. virens

Binomial name
- Tylopilus virens (W.F.Chiu) Hongo (1964)

Synonyms
- Boletus virens W.F.Chiu (1948); Tylopilus virens (W.F.Chiu) F.L.Tai (1979)

= Tylopilus virens =

Species of fungus

Tylopilus virens is a bolete fungus in the family Boletaceae found in Asia. It was described as new to science in 1948 by Wei-Fan Chiu as a species of Boletus; Japanese mycologist Tsuguo Hongo transferred it to Tylopilus in 1964. The fruit body has a convex to flattened cap that is 2.5–8 cm (1.0–3.1 in) in diameter. The tubes on the cap underside are up to 2 cm long, while the roundish pores are about 1–2 mm wide. The mushroom is similar in appearance to Tylopilus felleus, but unlike that species, has a greenish cap when young. T. virens typically grows near the conifer species Keteleeria evelyniana. It has elliptical spores measuring 11–14 by 5.5–6 μm.
