= Chendai =

Chendai may refer to the following locations in China:

- Chendai, Jinjiang, Fujian (陈埭镇), town
- Chendai, Yunxiao County (陈岱镇), town in Yunxiao County, Fujian
