= Lingshui =

Lingshui may refer to:

- Lingshui Li Autonomous County, county in Hainan, China
- Lingshui (village), village in Jinjiang, Fujian, China
