= Yongning, Fujian =

Yongning 永宁
- Town
- 永宁镇
- Location in Fujian Yongning (China)
- Coordinates: 24°40′44″N 118°41′45″E
- Country: China
- Province: Fujian
- Prefecture-level city: Quanzhou
- County-level city: Shishi

Area
  - Total: 29.53 km^{2} (11.40 sq mi)
- Elevation: 22 m (72 ft)

Population (2003)
  - Total: 53,474
  - Density: 1,811/km^{2} (4,690/sq mi)
- Time zone: UTC+8 (China Standard)
- Postal code: 350581106
- Area code: 0595

Yongning (simplified Chinese: 永宁; traditional Chinese: 永寧; pinyin: Yǒngníng) is a town on the southern coast of Fujian province of Southeast China. It is under the administration of Shishi City, which is 8 kilometres (5.0 mi) away. It is surrounded on three sides by water, facing the Taiwan Strait to the east, Mount Baoshan (宝盖山) to the west, and the town of Shenhu and Shenhu Bay (深沪湾) to the south. As of 2018, there are 4 residential communities and 20 villages under the town's administration.
