= Jin River (Fujian) =

River in Fujian, China

Coordinates: 24.878339°N 118.59724°E

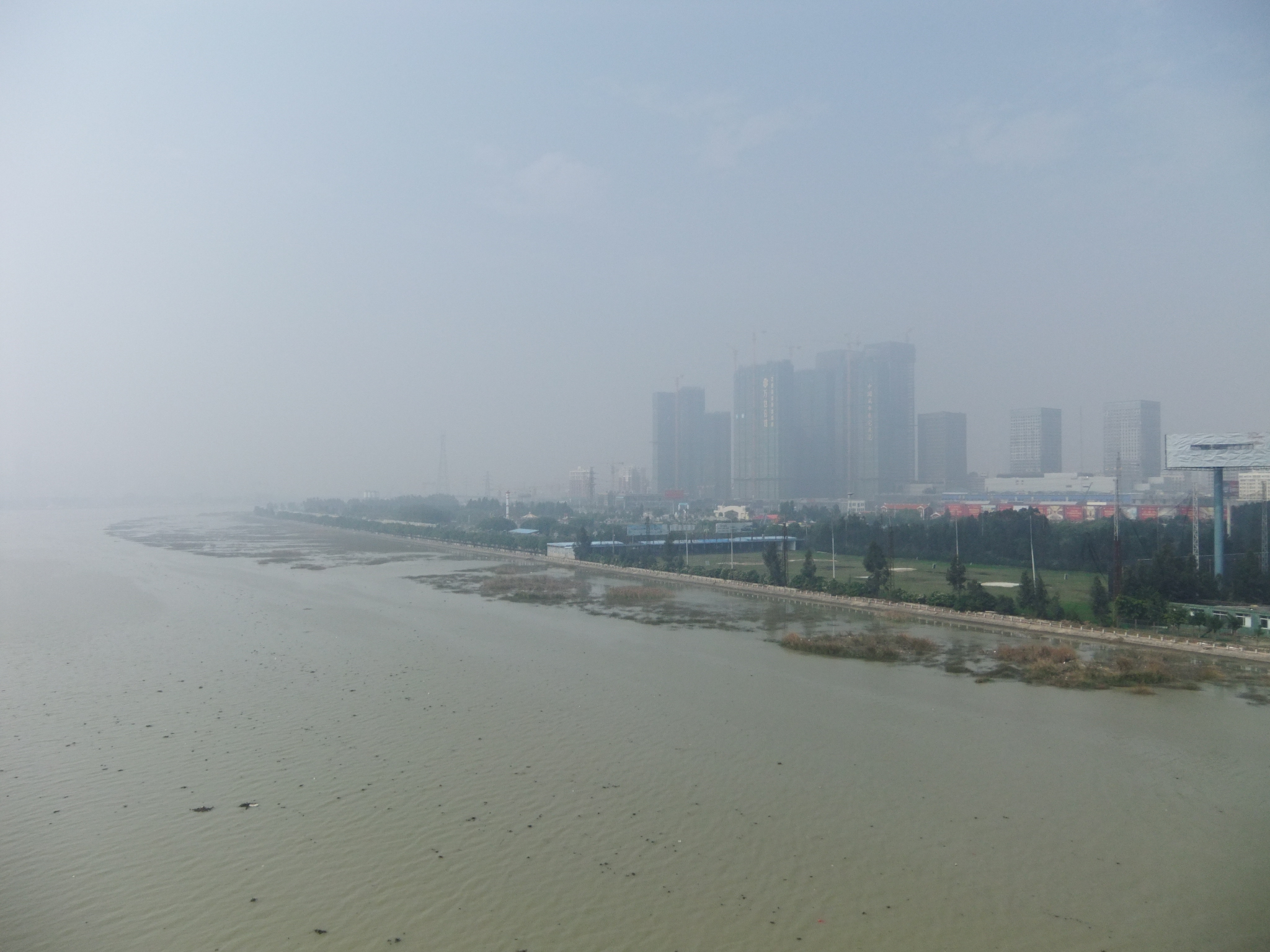
- The Jin River in Quanzhou
- Traditional Chinese: 晉江
- Simplified Chinese: 晋江
Transcriptions
Standard Mandarin
- Hanyu Pinyin: Jìnjiāng
- Wade–Giles: Chin^{4}-chiang^{1}
Southern Min
- Hokkien POJ: Chìn-kang

The Jin River, also known in Hokkien Chinese: 晉江; Pe̍h-ōe-jī: Chìn-kang; Mandarin Chinese: 晉江; pinyin: Jìnjiāng, is located in southern Fujian. Its basin includes most of Quanzhou prefecture-level city, whose Jinjiang County-level City is named after it.

== Name ==
The name of the river comes from the 3rd-to-5th-century Jin Empire, during which time its banks were settled by Min-speaking Chinese settlers from the Min River via the coasts of Fujian.

== Geography ==
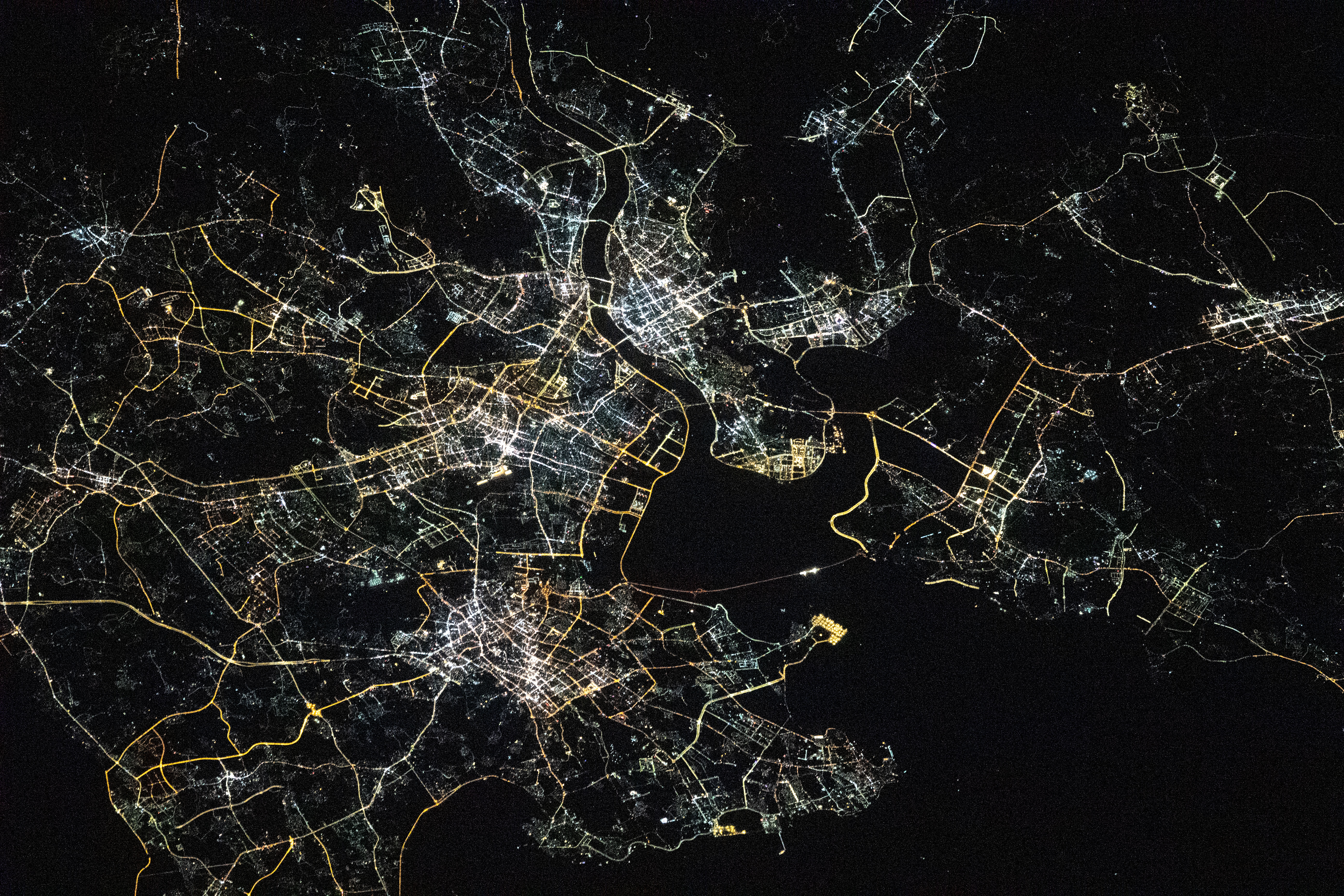
Quanzhou, a port city on China's Taiwan Strait, split by the Jinjiang River, is pictured during an orbital night pass from the International Space Station at an altitude of 262 miles above the Asian nation

The upper course of the Jin is also known as the Xixi (西溪, "West Creek"). It originates in the Daiyun Mountains (戴云山) and flows generally southeast for 180 kilometers (110 mi) into Quanzhou Bay on the Taiwan Strait. East of Nan'an, the Xixi receives its major tributary, the Dongxi (东溪, "East Creek"), from the north. The Jin River develops an estuary as it enters Quanzhou Bay from the west. There, it separates downtown Quanzhou (aka Licheng, Fengze and Luojiang districts, respectively) to the north from Jinjiang to its south.

There are 13 towns around the river: Chinyan, Chidian, Chendai, Luoshan, Cizao, Neikeng, Anhai, Dongshi, Yonghe, Yinglin, Longhu, Shenhu and Jinjinchu. Zimao Mountain is also nearby.

== Climate ==
The annual rain fall level ranges from 820 to 2,276 millimeters (32.3 to 89.6 in), so the Jin River sees dramatic changes in volume during the year.

== See also ==
- List of rivers of China
- Rivers of Fujian
