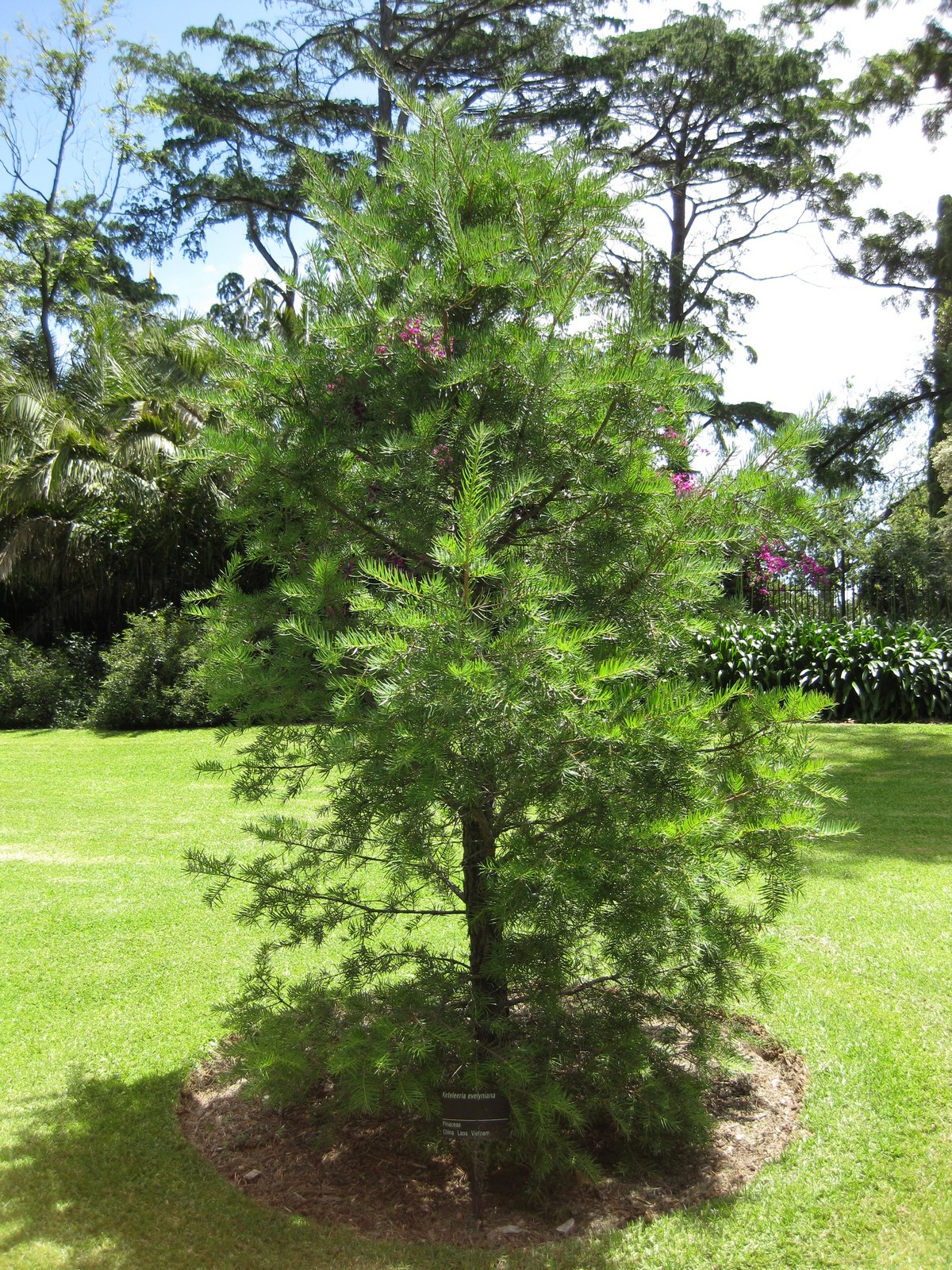

Conservation status
- Vulnerable (IUCN 3.1)

Scientific classification
- Kingdom: Plantae
- Clade: Tracheophytes
- Clade: Gymnosperms
- Division: Pinophyta
- Class: Pinopsida
- Order: Pinales
- Family: Pinaceae
- Genus: Keteleeria
- Species: K. evelyniana

Binomial name
- Keteleeria evelyniana Mast.

Synonyms
- Homotypic Synonyms: Keteleeria davidiana subsp. evelyniana (Mast.) Eckenw.; Heterotypic Synonyms: Keteleeria dopiana Flous; Keteleeria evelyniana var. dopiana (Flous) Silba; Keteleeria evelyniana subsp. hainanensis (Chun & Tsiang) Silba; Keteleeria evelyniana var. hainanensis (Chun & Tsiang) Silba; Keteleeria evelyniana var. pendula Hsueh; Keteleeria evelyniana subsp. roulletii (A.Chev.) Silba; Keteleeria evelyniana var. roulletii (A.Chev.) Silba; Keteleeria hainanensis Chun & Tsiang; Keteleeria roulletii (A.Chev.) Flous; Tsuga roulletii A.Chev.; Tsuga roulletii A.Chev.

= Keteleeria evelyniana =

Species of conifer

Keteleeria evelyniana (Evelyn keteleeria, Chinese: 云南油杉; pinyin: Yúnnán yóushān, Vietnamese: Du sam) is a species of conifer in the pine family, Pinaceae. It is native to southern China, Laos and Vietnam. It can grow to a height of 40 metres (130 ft).

== Taxonomic notes ==
Syn: Keteleeria delavayi Van Tieghem 1891; K. dopiana Flous 1936; K. roulletii Flous 1936; K. hainanensis Chun et Tsiang 1963; K. evelyniana var. pendula Hsueh 1983. Farjon (1989) provides a thorough taxonomic review of the genus.

== Range and ecology ==
Laos, Vietnam (as far south as the Plateau of Lang Bian near Da Lat), and China: SW Sichuan, Yunnan (where it probably intergrades with K. davidiana), and possibly the central mountains of Hainan.

Keteleeria evelyniana grows in Vietnam at elevations above 500 metres (1,600 ft) and is shade intolerant, prefers neutral soils, and is typically associated with Pinus spp. or with species of Fagaceae and Lauraceae. It is the most widespread conifer in northwest Vietnam.

== Cultivation and uses ==
The timber of Keteleeria evelyniana is insect resistant and is useful for construction and household furniture making. It may also be used in construction, railroad ties, mine timbering and sundry house implements. The seeds are rich in essential oil that can be used for burning and soap manufacturing. The tree can also be used in traditional medicine.

In mid-December 2009, a Keteleeria evelyniana located in Seattle's Washington Park Arboretum was cut down. It was thought that the unknown person who was responsible for the cutting down of the tree took it for a Christmas tree. The tree was planted in 1998, and transplanted from China's Yunnan province.

In 2013, the species was listed as vulnerable on The IUCN Red List of Threatened Species after a 2010 assessment which found the tree's population to be in significant decline and fragmented.

It is listed (as K. roulletii) as threatened in Vietnam by the World Conservation Monitoring Centre.

== Gallery ==
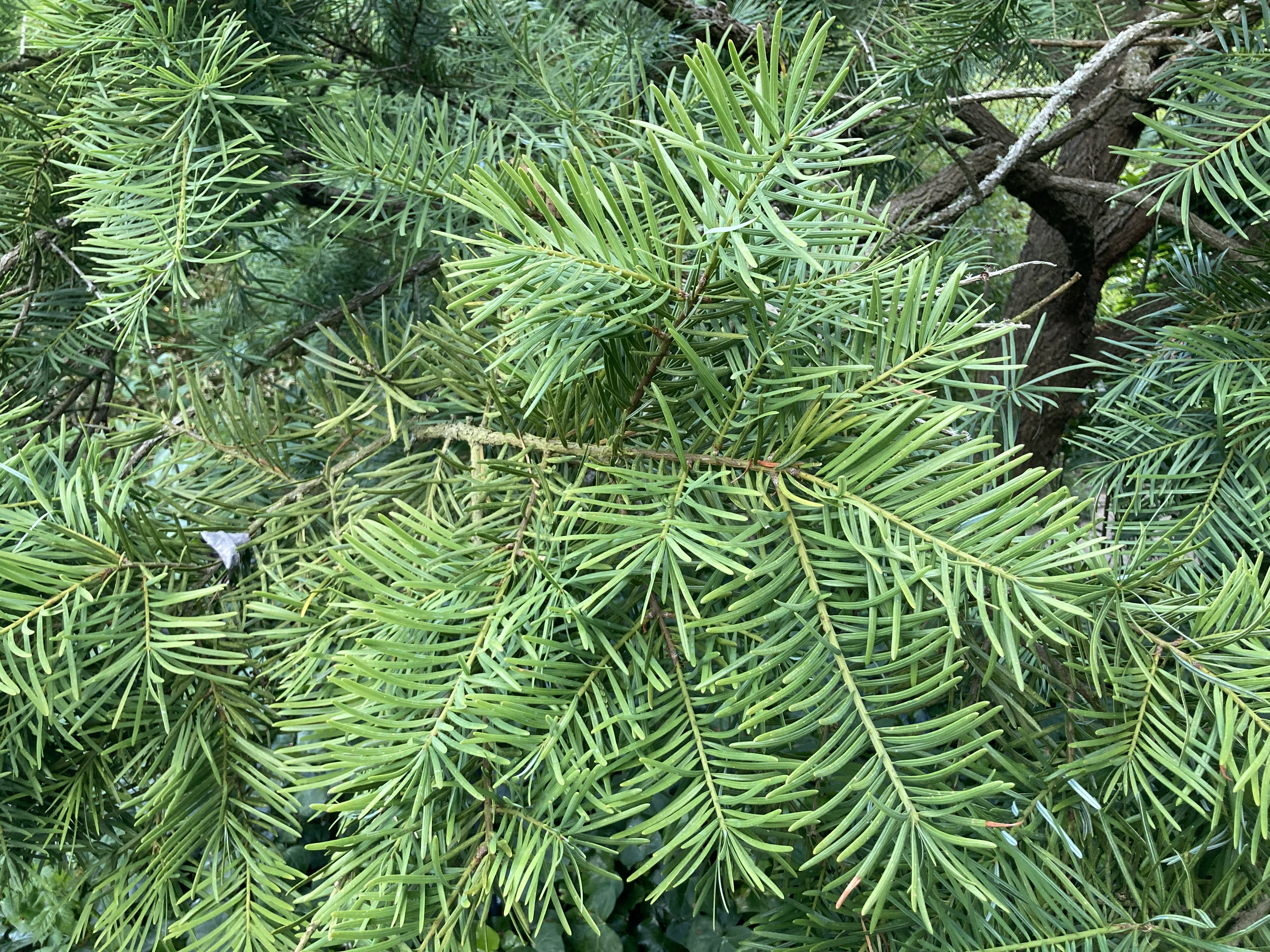
Detail of the needles

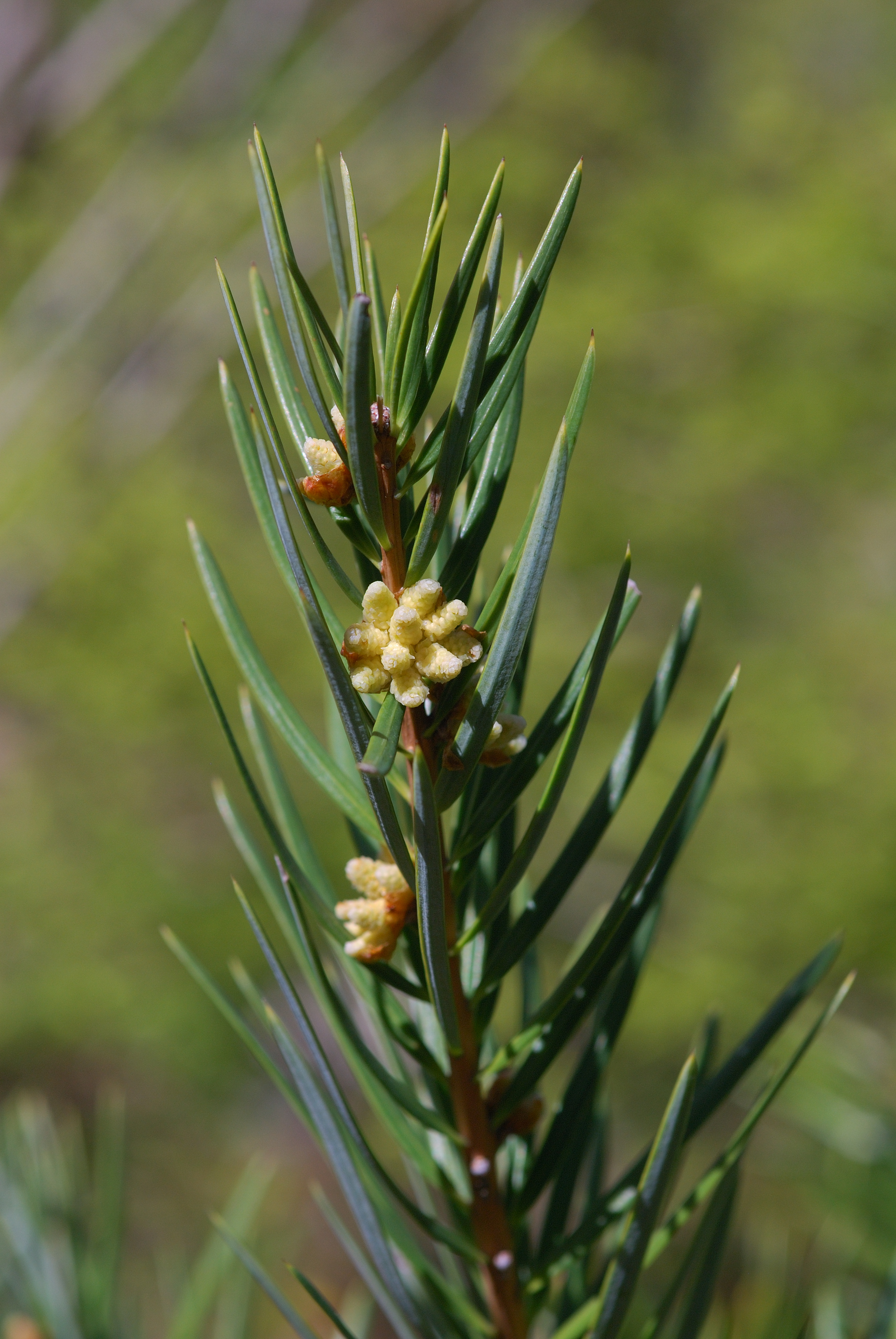
The flowers

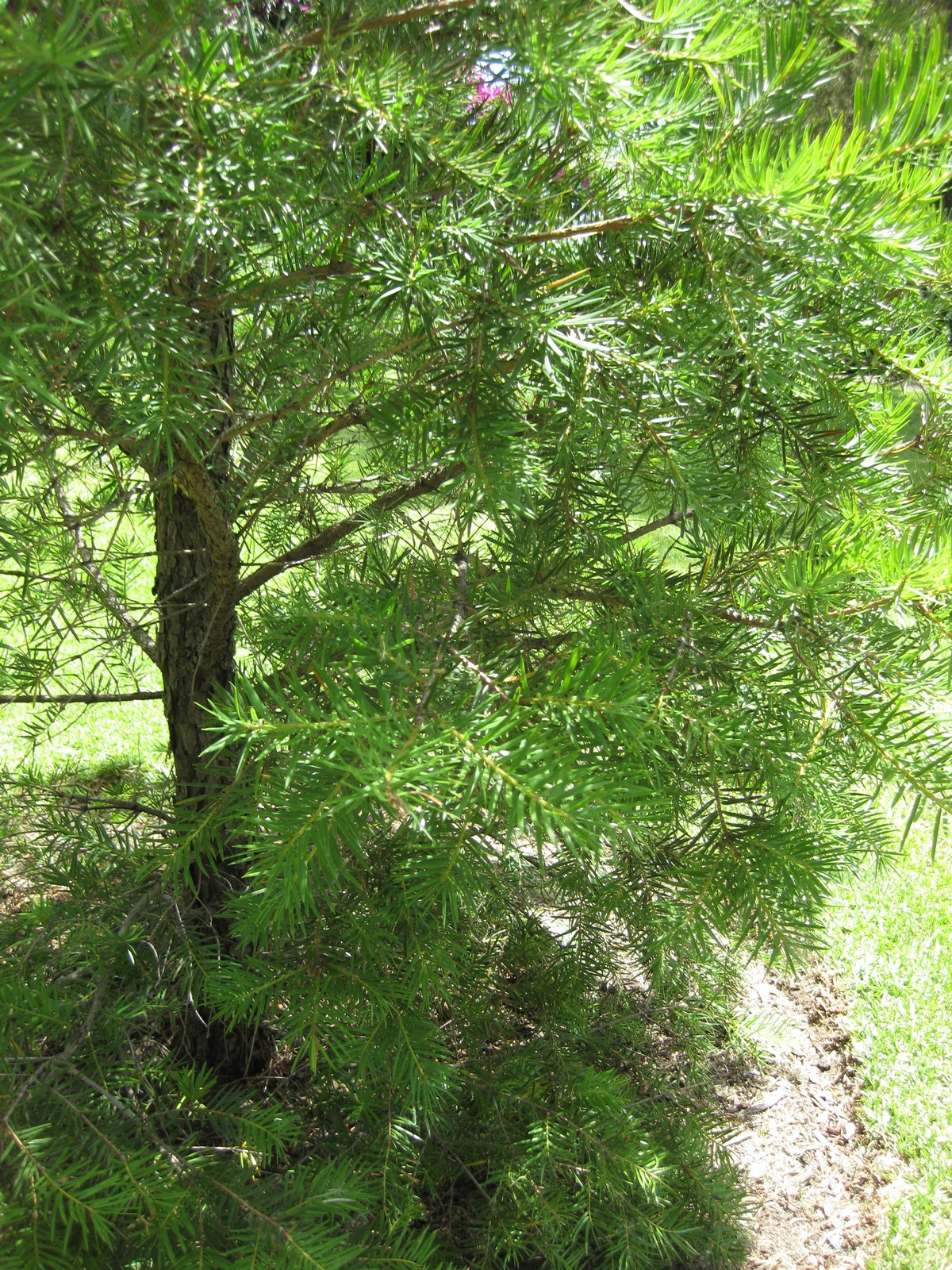
A young tree

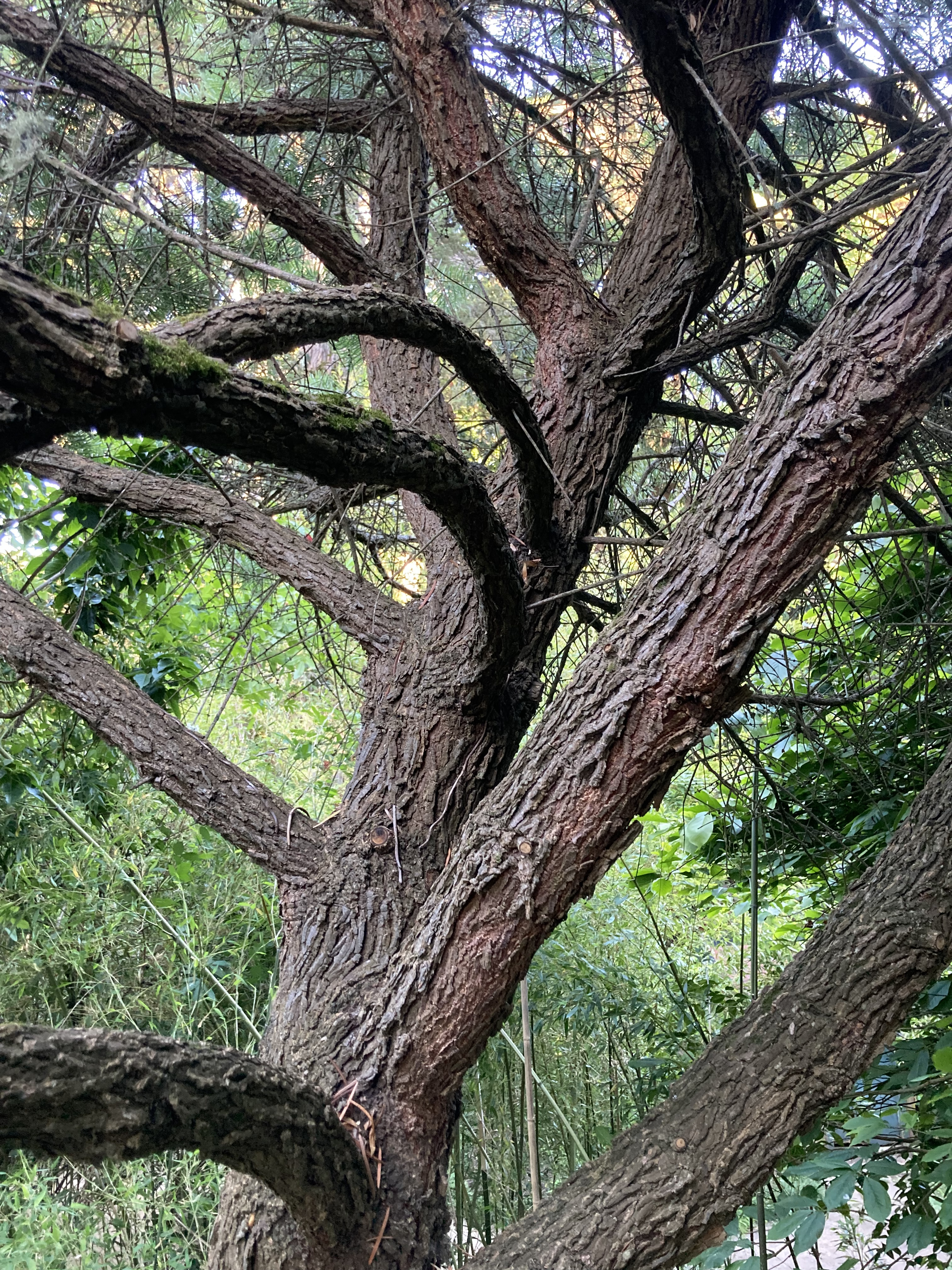
The bark

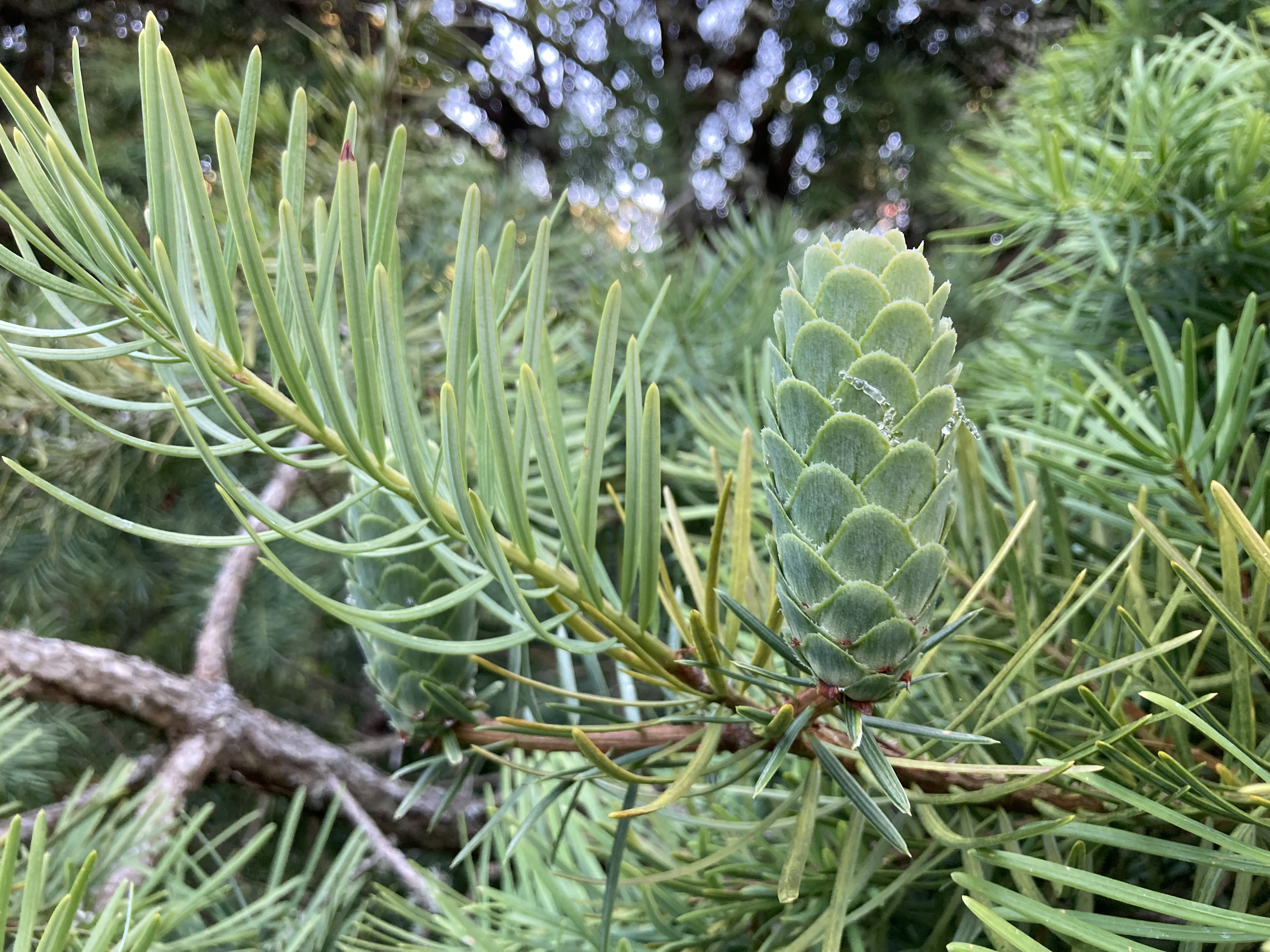
A young cone

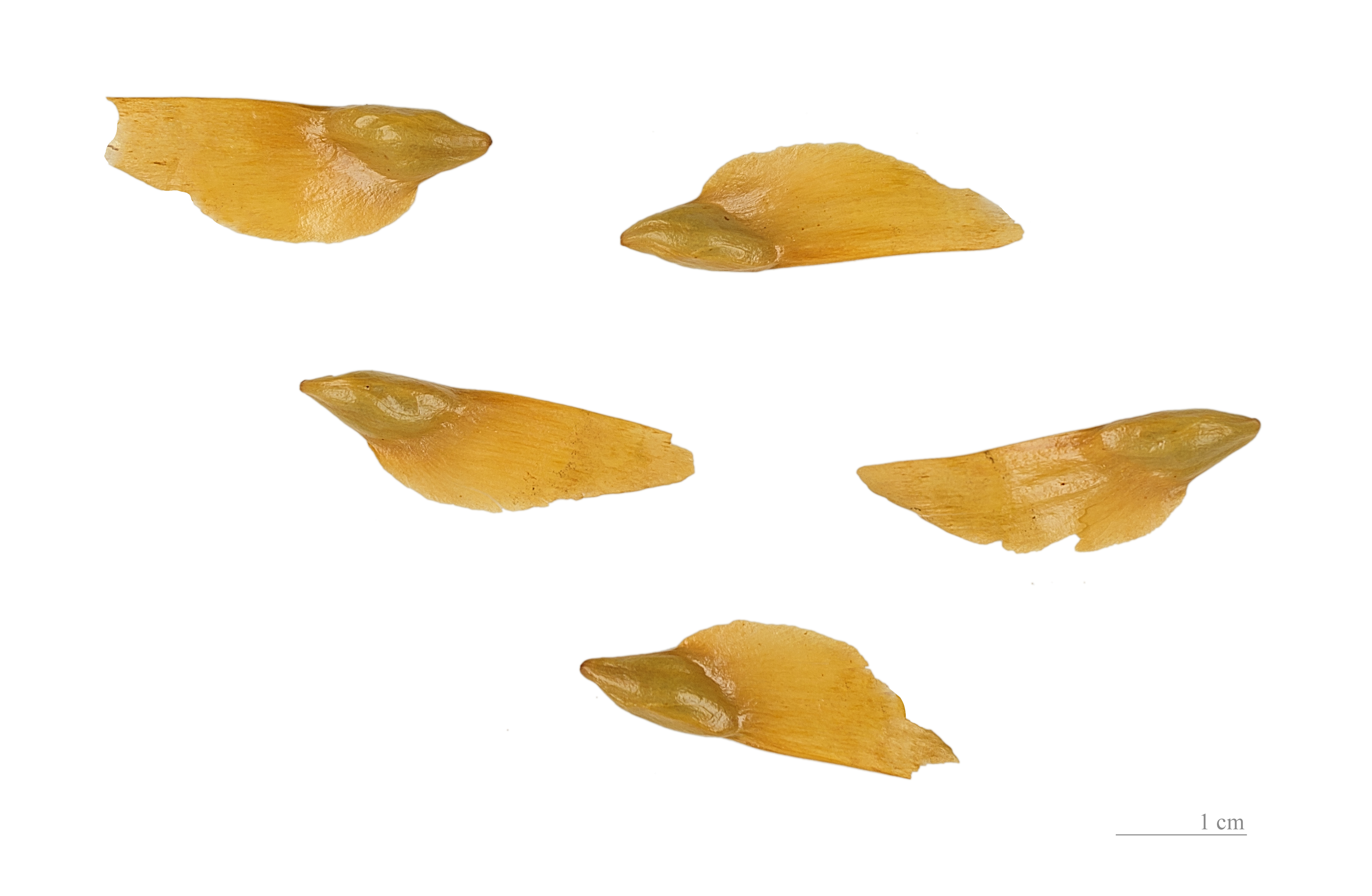
Seed

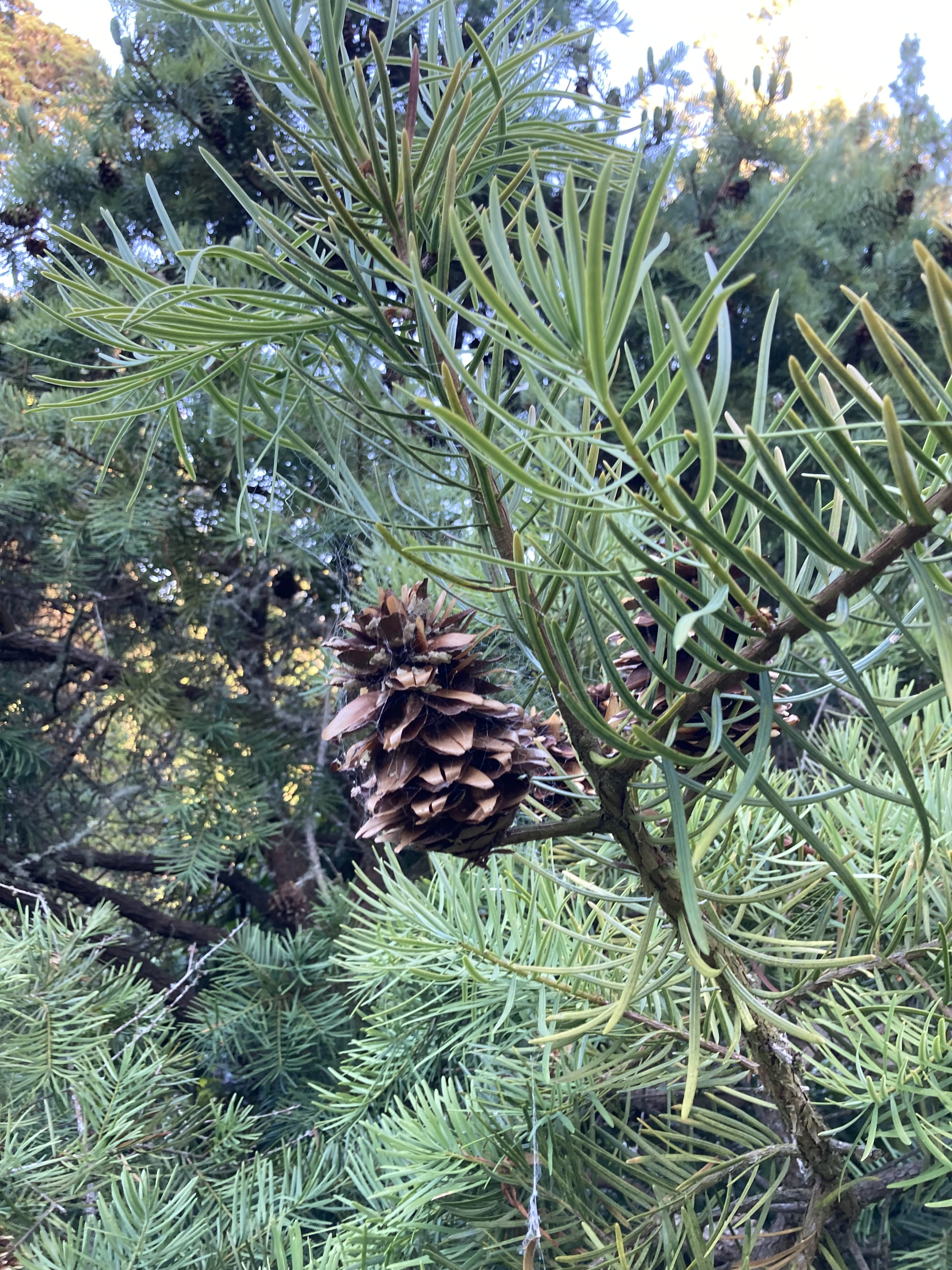
A mature cone
