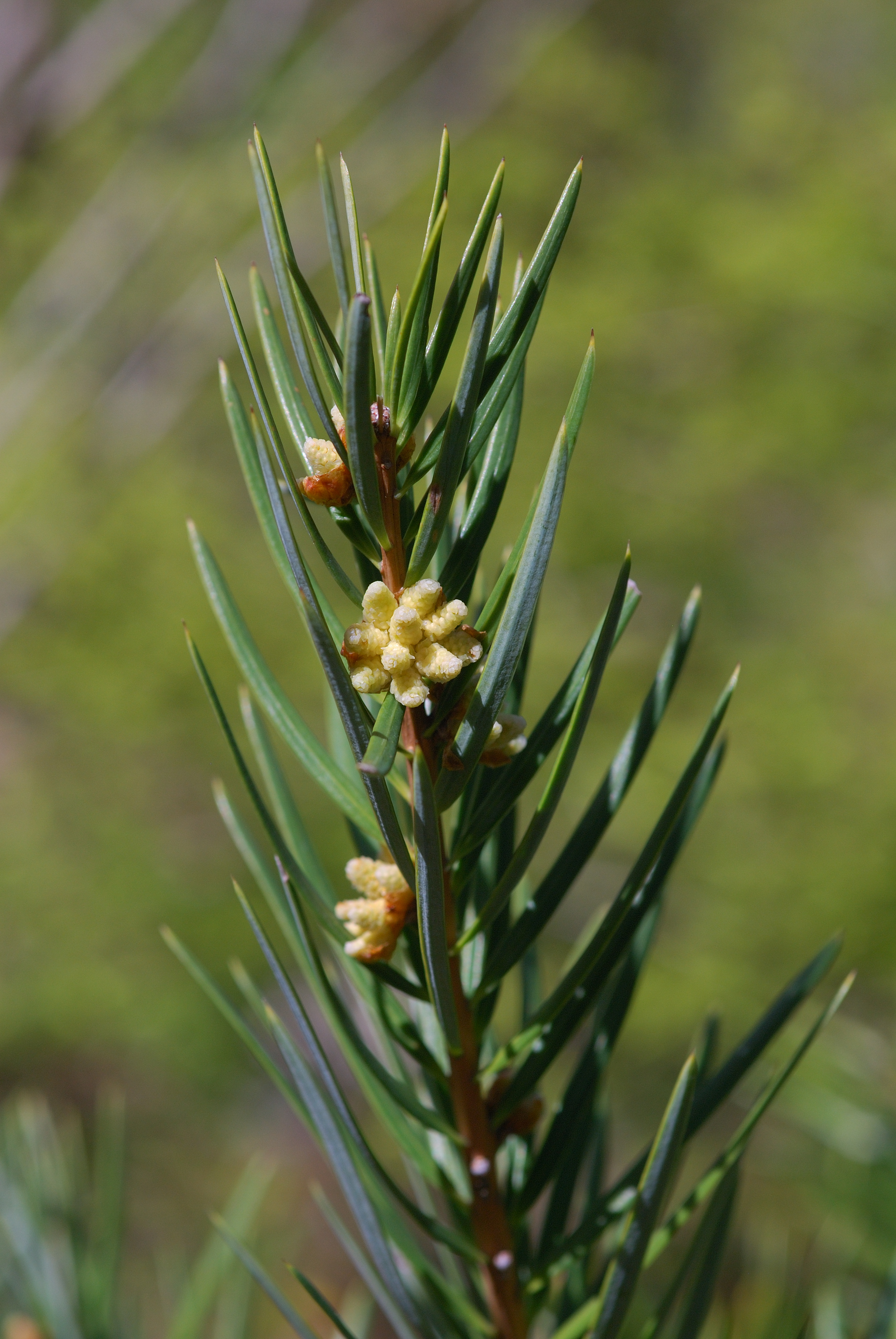
- Keteleeria evelyniana leaves

Scientific classification
- Kingdom: Plantae
- Clade: Tracheophytes
- Clade: Gymnosperms
- Division: Pinophyta
- Class: Pinopsida
- Order: Pinales
- Family: Pinaceae
- Subfamily: Abietoideae
- Genus: Keteleeria; Carrière

Type species
- Keteleeria fortunei (Murray) Carrière

= Keteleeria =

Keteleeria Temporal range: Barremian–Recent

Genus of conifers

Keteleeria is a genus of three species of coniferous trees in the pine family, Pinaceae, first described as a genus in 1866.

The genus name Keteleeria honours J.B. Keteleer (1813–1903), a French nurseryman. The group is related to the genera Nothotsuga and Pseudolarix. It is distinguished from Nothotsuga by the much larger cones, and from Pseudolarix by the evergreen leaves and the cones not disintegrating readily at maturity. All three genera share the unusual feature of male cones produced in umbels of several together from a single bud, and also in their ability, very rare in the Pinaceae, of being able to coppice.

The genus is found in southern China (from Shaanxi south to Guangdong, Yunnan and Hainan), Hong Kong, Taiwan, northern Laos, and Vietnam.

They are coniferous trees reaching 35 m (115 ft) tall. The leaves are flat, needle-like, 1.5–7 cm (9/16–2 3/4 in) long and 2–4 cm (13/16–1 9/16 in) broad. The cones are erect, 6–22 cm (2 3/8–8 11/16 in) long, and mature in about 6–8 months after pollination; cone size and scale shape is very variable within all three species.

The variability of the cones has led in the past to the description of several additional species (up to 16 'species' have been named), but most authorities now only accept three species. Flora of China, however, recognized five.

== Phylogeny ==
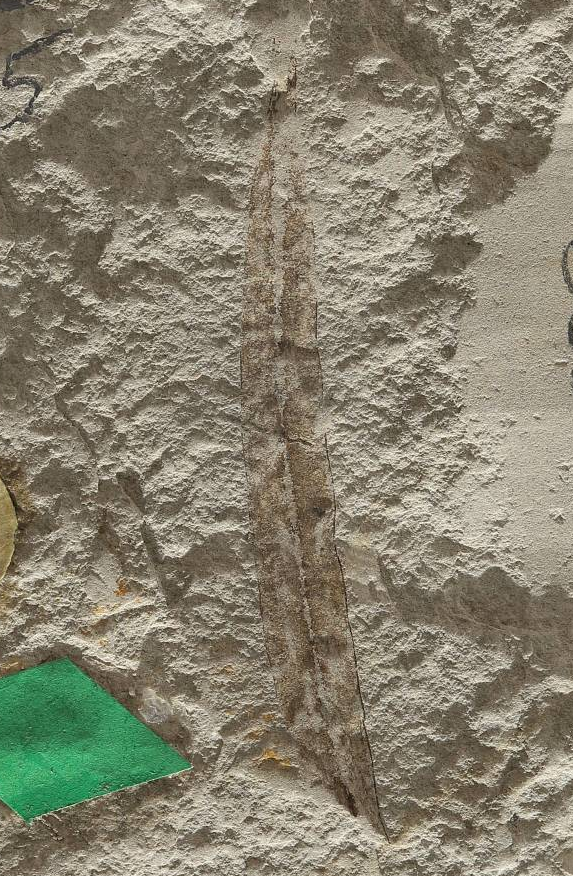
Keteleeria heterophylloides Latah Formation, Spokane, Washington

Stull et al. 2021

- Keteleeria
  - K. davidiana (Bertrand) Beissner
  - - K. evelyniana Masters (Evelyn keteleeria)
    - K. fortunei (Murray 1862) Carrière

The World Checklist maintained by the Royal Botanic Gardens, Kew accepts the following:

Species

- Keteleeria davidiana (C.E.Bertrand) Beissn. — central and southern China, Taiwan
- Keteleeria evelyniana Mast. — Sichuan, Yunnan, N Laos, Vietnam
- Keteleeria fortunei (A.Murray) Carrière — southern China
- †Keteleeria heterophylloides (Berry) Brown, 1935 - Miocene (Langhian) Latah Formation, Washington

formerly included

moved to Abies

- Keteleeria fabri =Abies fabri — Sichuan

=== Fossil record ===
The earliest record of the genus is from the Early Cretaceous (Barremian -Aptian ~120 million years ago) of China.

Fossil pollen of Keteleeria caucasica have been recovered from strata of the Late Miocene in Georgia in the Caucasus region. Undescribed Keteleeria sp. fossils are known from the early Pleistocene of southern Portugal and the Coldwater Beds in the Early Eocene Okanagan Highlands of Canada. Named species based on cones, leaves, pollen, seeds, and wood have been described from Cretaceous through Pliocene sediments in Europe, North America and Asia.

- Keteleeria caucasica Ramischvili - pollen; Miocene, Kulistskhali river, Georgia
- Keteleeria cretacea Miki & Yas. Maeda - cones; Cretaceous, Izumi Group, Japan
- Keteleeria ezoana Tanai - cones & seeds; Miocene, Yoshioka, Japan
- Keteleeria heterophylloides (Berry) Brown - leaves; Miocene, Latah Formation, Washington, US
- Keteleeria hoehnei Kirchheimer - cones; Miocene, Wiesa near Kamenz, Germany
- Keteleeria mabetiensis (Watari) Watari - wood; Miocene, Mabechi River; Japan
- Keteleeria microreticulata Ananova - pollen; Miocene, Taganrog peninsula, Russia
- Keteleeria prambachensis (E. Hofm.) W. Klaus - Oligocene, Prambachkirchen, Austria
- Keteleeria rhenana Kräusel - seeds; Miocene, Mainz-Kastel, Germany
- Keteleeria robusta Miki - cones; Pliocene, Tokitsu, Japan
- Keteleeria rujadana R.N. Lakh. - cones; Oligocene Rujada flora, Oregon, US
- Keteleeria shanwangensis Xiang et al. - cones; Miocene, Shanwang Formation, Shandong, China
- Keteleeria zhilinii - Blokhina & O.V. Bondarenko - wood; Pliocene, Pavlovsky basin, Primorye, Russia

Several fossil species were formerly included in Keteleeria but have been moved:

- Abiespollenites davidianaeformis (Zaklinsk.) Krutzsch formerly Keteleeria davidianaeformis Zaklinsk.
- Abiespollenites dubius (Chlon.) Krutzsch formerly Keteleeria dubia Chlon.
- Cathaya bergeri (Kirchheim.) Wilf. Schneider ex Mai & E. Velitzelos formerly Keteleeria bergeri Kirchheim.
- Cathaya loehri (Engelh. & Kink.) Chun & Kuang formerly Keteleeria loehri Engelh. & Kink.
