= Qingyang Subdistrict, Jinjiang =

Qingyang Subdistrict 青阳街道
- Subdistrict
- Location in Fujian
- Coordinates: 24°49′2″N 118°34′20″E
- Country: People's Republic of China
- Province: Fujian
- Prefecture-level city: Quanzhou
- County-level city: Jinjiang
- Time zone: UTC+8 (China Standard)

Qingyang Subdistrict (simplified Chinese: 青阳街道; traditional Chinese: 青陽街道; pinyin: Qīngyáng Jiēdào) is a subdistrict in Jinjiang, Quanzhou, Fujian Province, People's Republic of China.

== Subdivision of Qingyang ==
As of 2020, Qingyang Subdistrict has 13 communities: Qingxin Community (青新社区), Jinqing Community (锦青社区), Qinghua Community (青华社区), Lianyu Community (莲屿社区), Chencun Community (陈村社区), Xiahang Community (霞行社区), Zengjing Community (曾井社区), Gaoxia Community (高霞社区), Puzhao Community (普照社区), Hongzhai'an Community (洪宅垵社区), Xiangshan Community (象山社区), Yangguang Community (阳光社区), and Yongfuli Community (永福里社区).

== Religious buildings ==
- Qingyang Stonedrum Temple at Shigu Temple

== See also ==
- List of township-level divisions of Fujian
