= Eugene Chan (linguist) =

Chinese linguist

Eugene S. L. Chan
- 陳西林
- Born: Chen Xilin (陳西林); Jinjing (金井鎮), Jinjiang, Fujian
- Other name: Chan Sai Lam
- Occupation: Linguist

Academic work
- Discipline: Linguistics
- Institutions: Max Planck Institute for the Science of Human History
- Main interests: Numeral systems
- Website: https://lingweb.eva.mpg.de/channumerals/

Eugene Chan (or Eugene S.-L. Chan; Chinese: 陳西林; pinyin: Chén Xīlín) is a linguist from Hong Kong who specializes in numeral systems of world languages. He is best known as the creator and curator of the Numeral Systems of the World's Languages database, which contains lists of numerals for over 5,000 of the world's languages. The database is currently the largest online collection of numerals in the world's languages.

Chan is affiliated with the Max Planck Institute for the Science of Human History.

== Early life ==
Eugene Chan was born in Jinjing Township (金井鎮) in the city of Jinjiang, Fujian, China. He later moved to Hong Kong.

== Books ==
- Ndimele, Ozo-mekuri; Chan, Eugene S.L. (2016). The Numeral Systems of Nigerian Languages. Port Harcourt: M & J Grand Orbit Communications. doi:10.2307/j.ctvh8qznv. OCLC 949752166.
