= Lingxiu =

Lingxiu 灵秀镇
- Town
- Location in Fujian Lingxiu (China)
- Coordinates: 24°43′35″N 118°36′50″E
- Country: People's Republic of China
- Province: Fujian
- Prefecture-level city: Quanzhou
- County-level city: Shishi
- Elevation: 13 m (43 ft)
- Time zone: UTC+8 (China Standard)
- Postal code: 362700
- Area code: 0595

Lingxiu (simplified Chinese: 灵秀; traditional Chinese: 靈秀; pinyin: Língxiù) is a town of Shishi City, in the south of Fujian province, China.

== Administrative divisions ==
As of 2013, Lingxiu had a total of 13 administrative subdivisions, including one community and 12 villages, as follows:

- Shuguang Community (曙光社区)
- Shilin Village (仕林村)
- Lingshi Village (灵狮村)
- Lingfeng Village (灵峰村)
- Lingshan Village (灵山村)
- Qianlang Village (前廊村)
- Huashan Village (华山村)
- Gangtang Village (港塘村)
- Taqian Village (塔前村)
- Maoxia Village (茂厦村)
- Tangyuan Village (塘园村)
- Pengtian Village (彭田村)
- Chaokeng Village (钞坑村)

== See also ==
- List of township-level divisions of Fujian
