= Jinjiang, Quanzhou =

Jinjiang 晋江市 Tsinkiang
- County-level city
- City of Jinjiang, City of Quanzhou, Province of Fujian
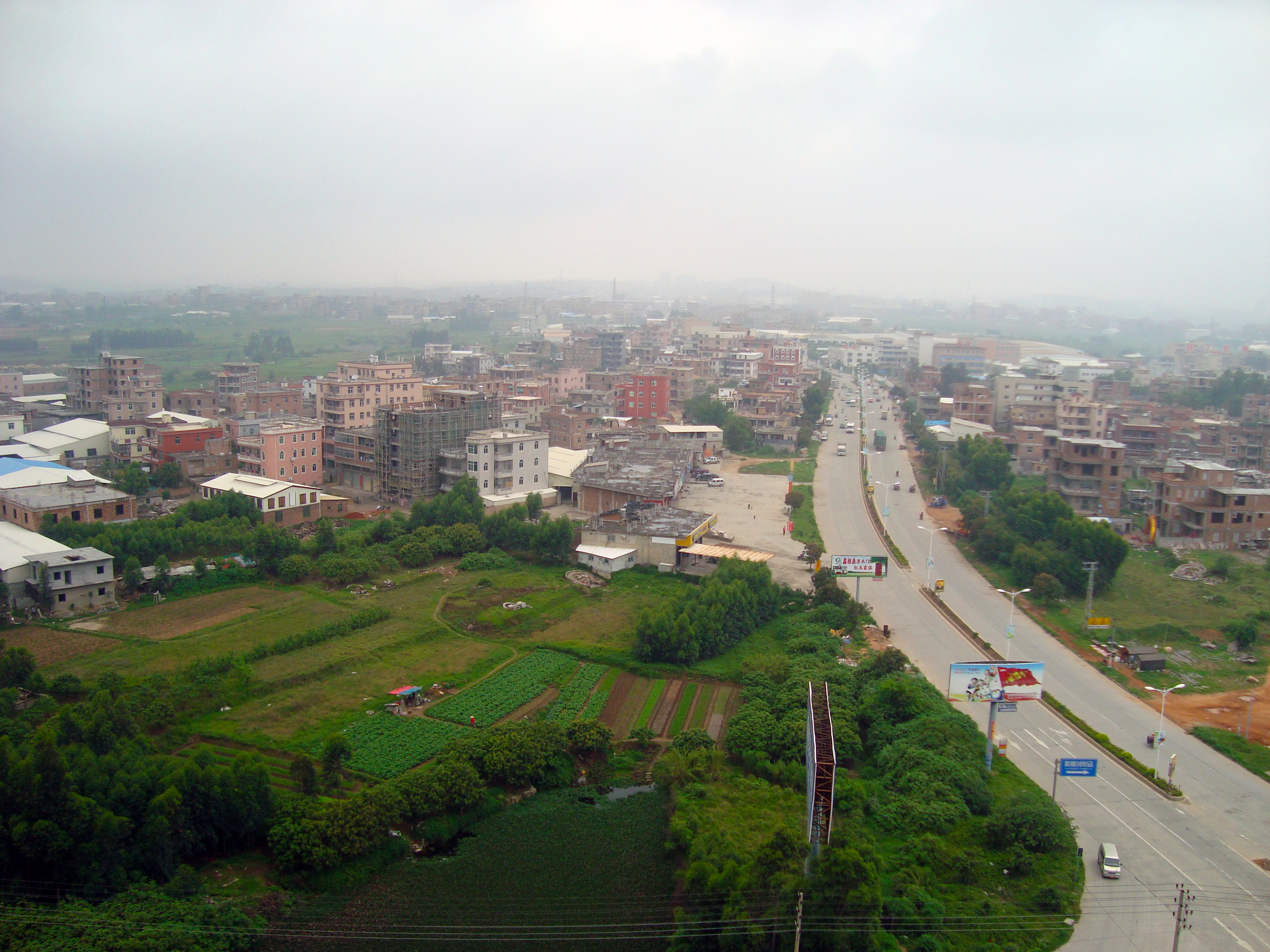
- Jinjiang

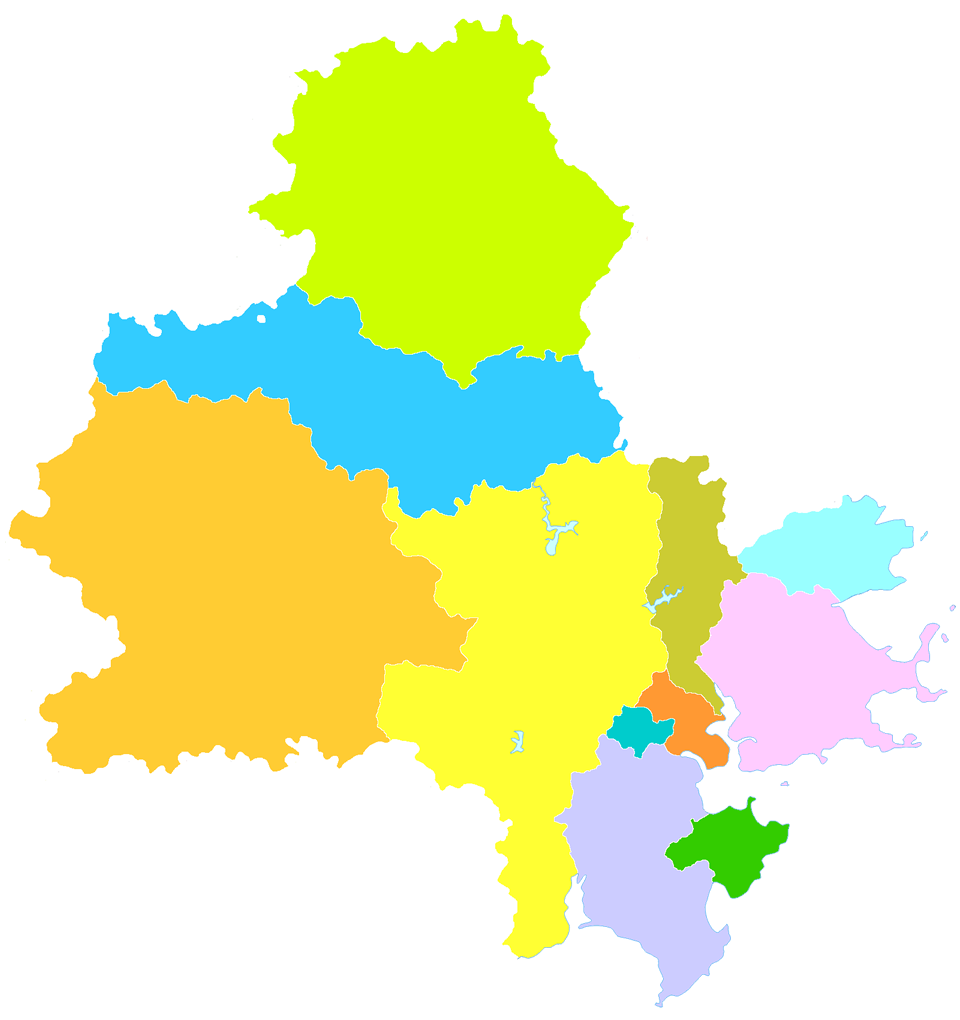
- Jinjiang in Quanzhou

- Location in Fujian
- Coordinates (Jinjiang municipal government): 24°46′54″N 118°33′06″E
- Country: People's Republic of China
- Province: Fujian
- Prefecture-level city: Quanzhou
- City seat: Luoshan Subdistrict (罗山街道)

Area
  - Total: 721.7 km^{2} (278.6 sq mi)

Population (2020 census)
  - Total: 2,061,551
  - Density: 2,857/km^{2} (7,398/sq mi)
- Time zone: UTC+8 (China Standard)
- Postal code: 362200
- Area code: 0595
- Website: www.JinJiang.gov.cn

Jinjiang City (Chinese: 晋江市; pinyin: Jìnjiāng; Pe̍h-ōe-jī: Chìn-kang) is a county-level city under Quanzhou City, Fujian Province, China. It is located in the southeastern part of the province (Minnan), on the right or south bank of the Jin River, across from Quanzhou's urban district of Fengze and Licheng. Jinjiang also borders the Taiwan Strait of the East China Sea to the south, and Quanzhou's other county-cities of Shishi and Nan'an to the east and west, respectively. It has an area of 721.7 square kilometres (278.6 sq mi) and a population of 2,061,551 as of 2020.

Jinjiang has the only extant Manichean temple in China (Cao'an temple) and is near the eastern end of the world's longest estimated straight-line (great circle) path over land, at 11,241 km (6,985 mi), ending near Sagres, Portugal.

== Administrative divisions ==
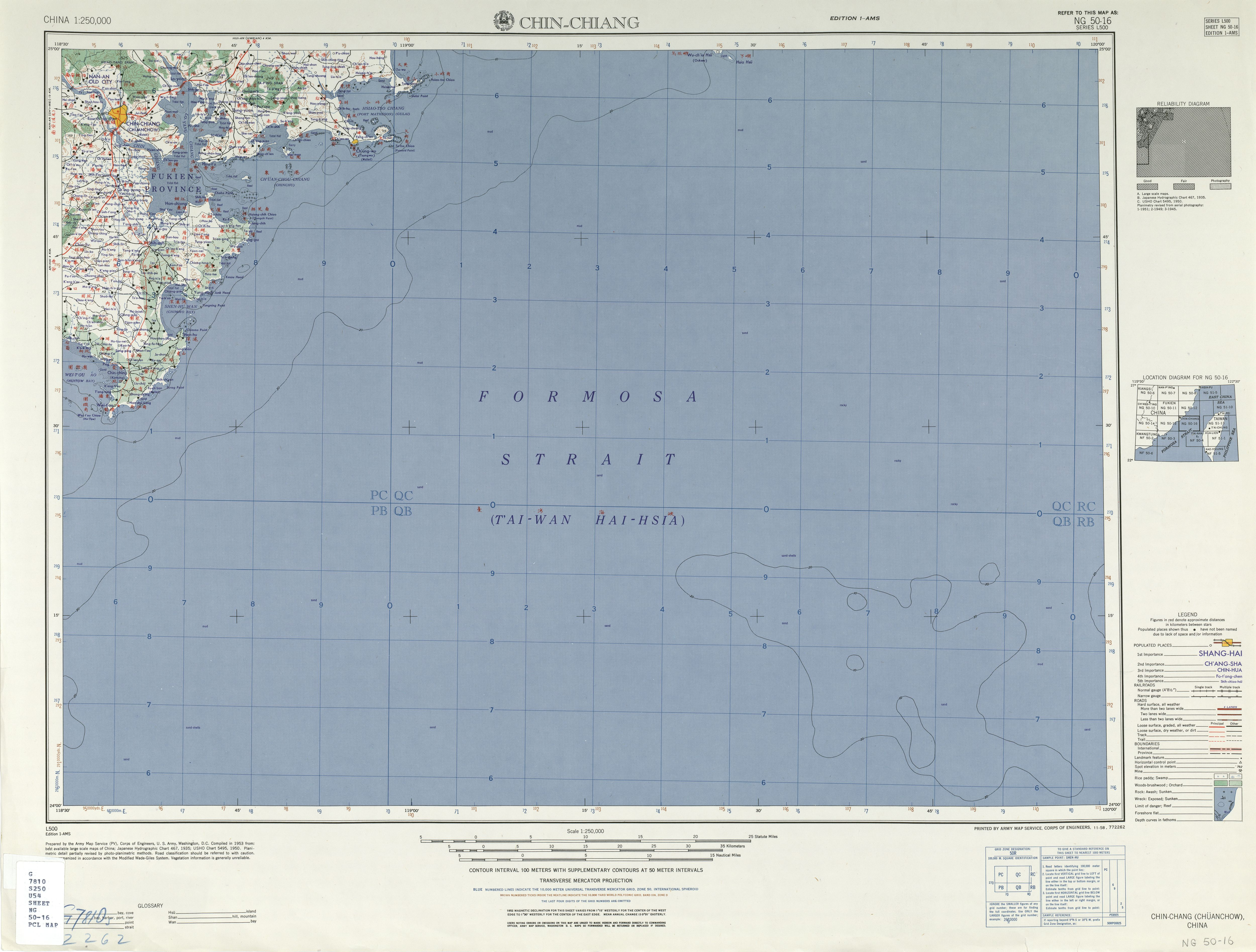
Map of Jinjiang (labeled as CHIN-CHIANG (CHÜANCHOW) 晋江) and nearby areas (1953)

Jinjiang has six subdistricts and 13 towns:

Subdistricts

- Lingyuan (灵源街道)
- Luoshan (罗山街道)
- Meiling (梅岭街道)
- Qingyang (青阳街道)
- Xintang (新塘街道)
- Xiyuan (西园街道)

Towns

- Anhai (安海镇)
- Chendai (陈埭镇)
- Chidian (池店镇)
- Cizao (磁灶镇)
- Dongshi (东石镇)
- Jinjing (金井镇)
- Longhu (龙湖镇)
- Neikeng (内坑镇)
- Shenhu (深沪镇)
- Xibin (西滨镇)
- Yinglin (英林镇)
- Yonghe (永和镇)
- Zimao (紫帽镇)
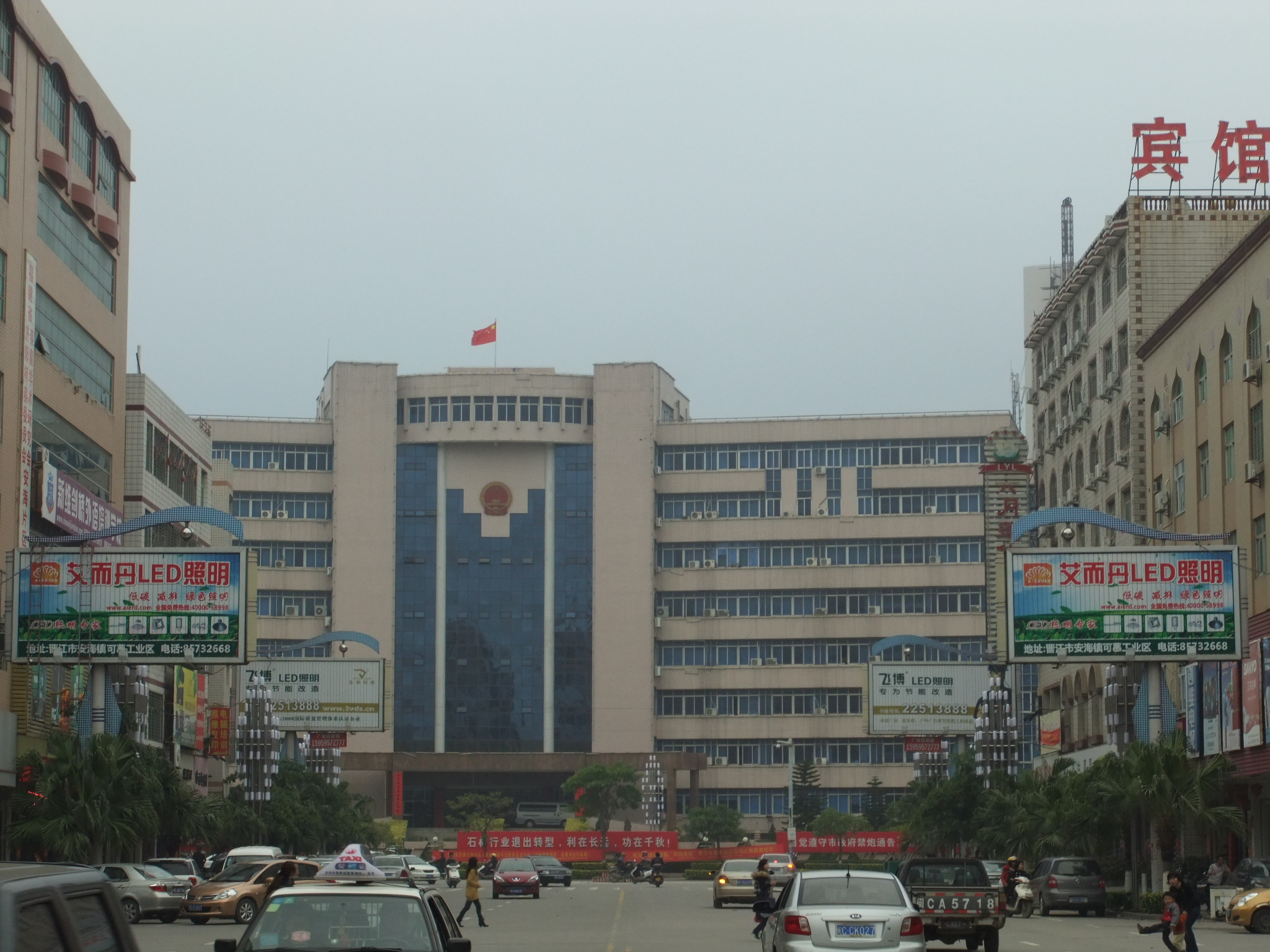
Anhai Town Government

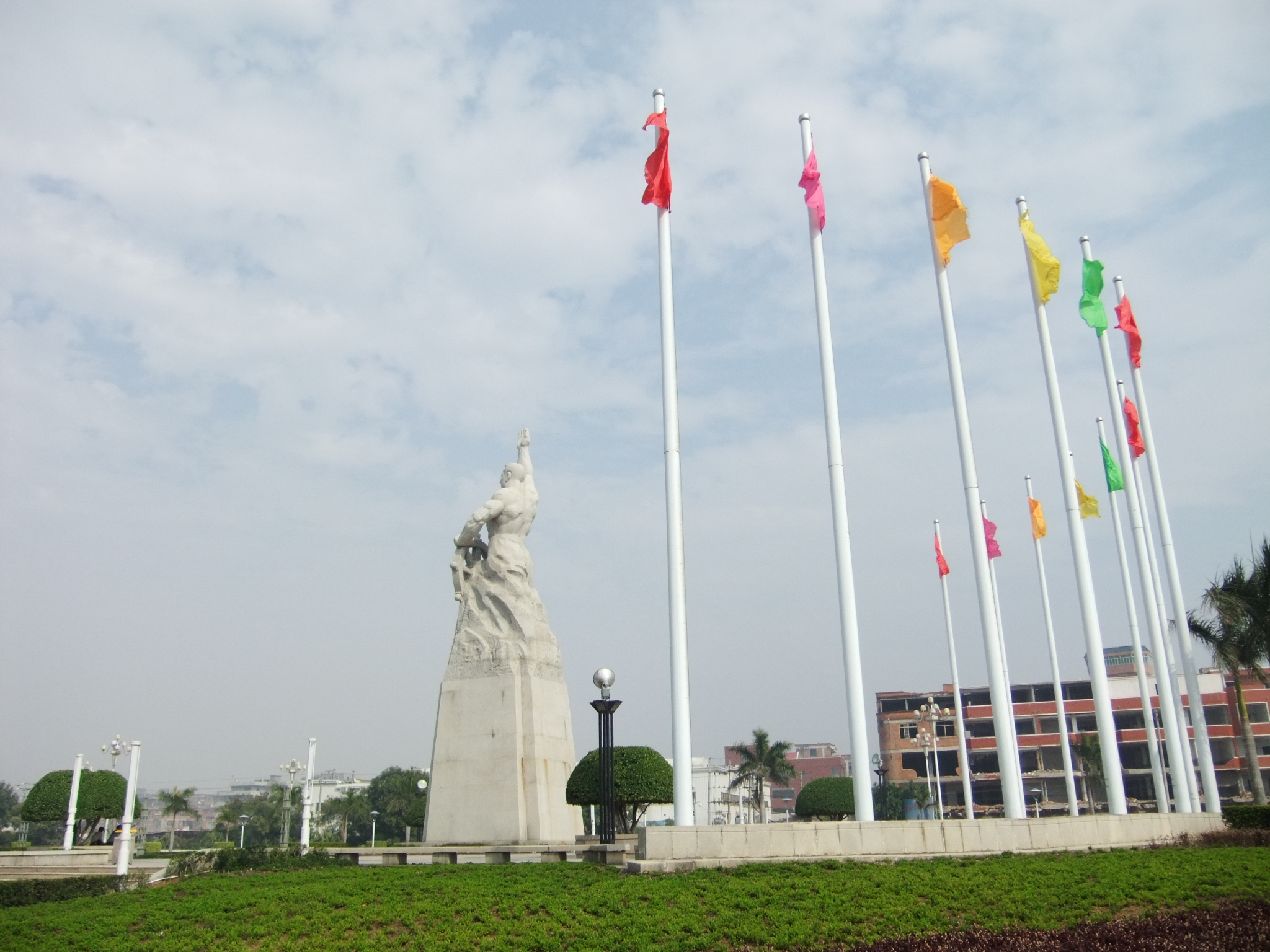
Jinjiang's Lüzhou (Green Island) Park, with a monument bearing the inscription "诚信、谦恭、团结、拼搏" (Integrity, humility, unity, hard work)

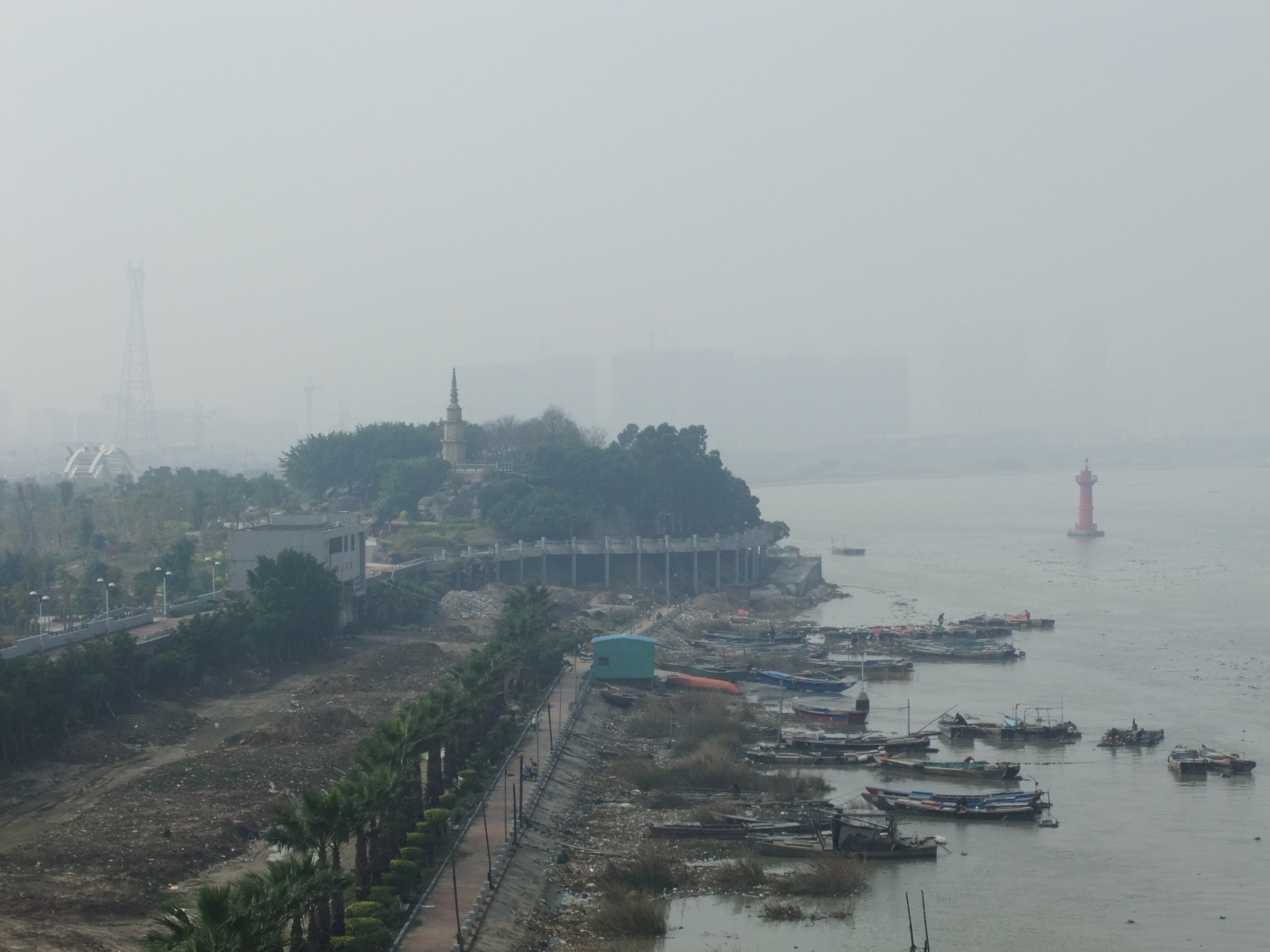
Jin River waterfront

== Demographics ==
Jinjiang is known for the large number of factories which operate there, especially in the clothing and name-brand footwear industry. Many migrant laborers come from elsewhere in Fujian and even from outside the province to commit themselves to year-long contracts.

Jinjiang is famous as home to many Chinese in diaspora, especially in Taiwan, Philippines, Malaysia, Singapore, Myanmar, Australia, etc. Once poor and overpopulated in late 19th century, many locals moved to Southeast Asia for better lives in what they called "下南洋" (Xià Nányáng; 'to sail down to the south sea'). Many of them have been successfully integrated into local societies and achieved great success. For example, according to Forbes, 6 out of 10 richest business tycoons in Philippines can trace their ancestry back to Jinjiang. Therefore, from the 80s to the 90s, Jinjiang received much donation and investment from overseas Chinese communities.

== Culture ==
=== Language ===
Jinjiang people speak the Jinjiang dialect, a variant of the Quanzhou dialect of Hokkien, which is largely intelligible to speakers of other Quanzhou, Xiamen, Zhangzhou and Taiwanese dialects, and also to speakers of other Hokkien dialects in many Chinese communities overseas, especially in places in southeast Asia such as Philippines, Singapore, Southern Peninsular Malaysian/Riau, Penang, Medan, etc. As in many parts of China, most Jinjiang people can use Putonghua (Mandarin) to communicate with non-local people in commercial and other daily interactions.

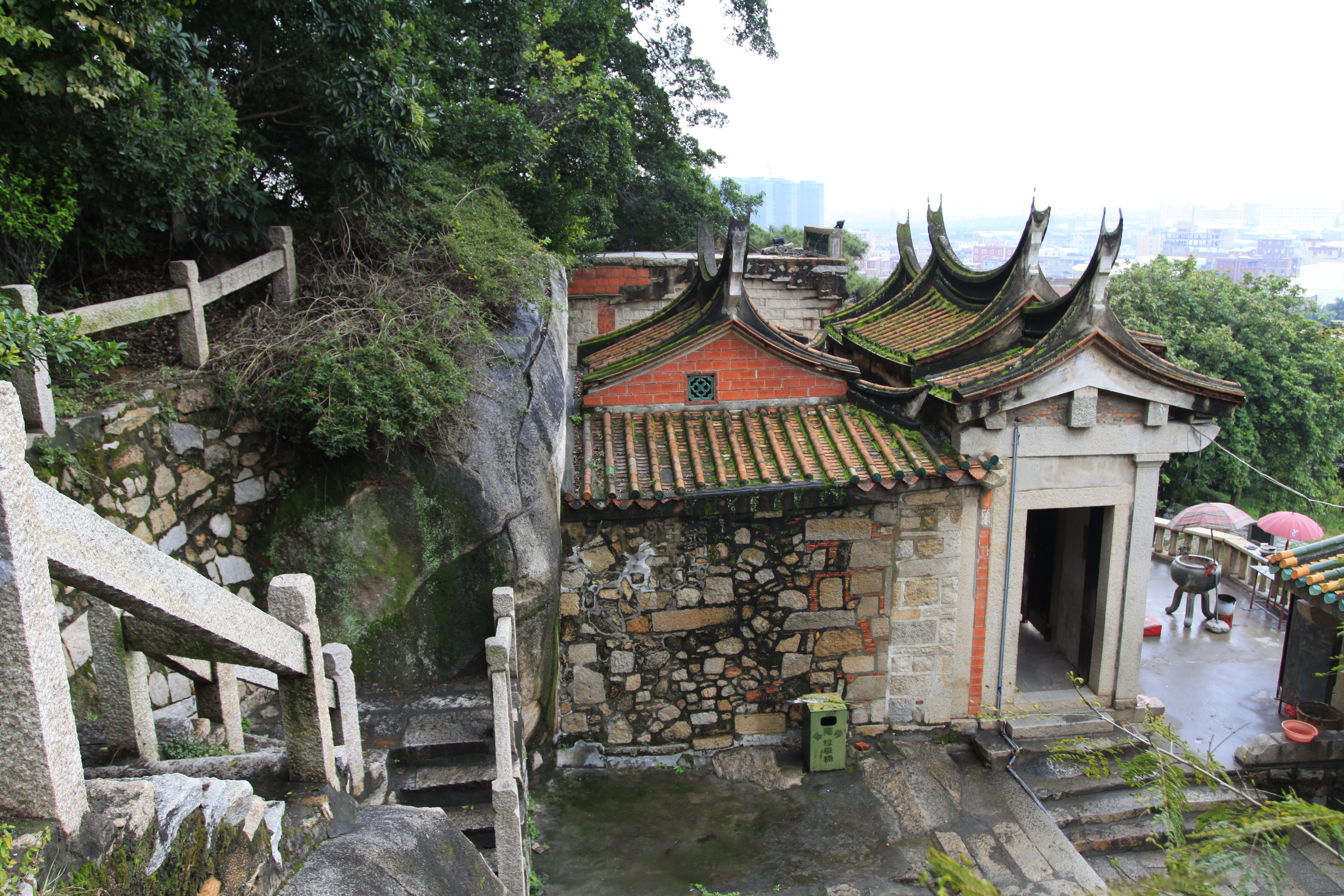
Cao'an Temple on Huabiao Hill near downtown Jinjiang, "a Manichean temple in Buddhist disguise", is thought to be "the only extant Manichean temple in China".

== Transportation ==
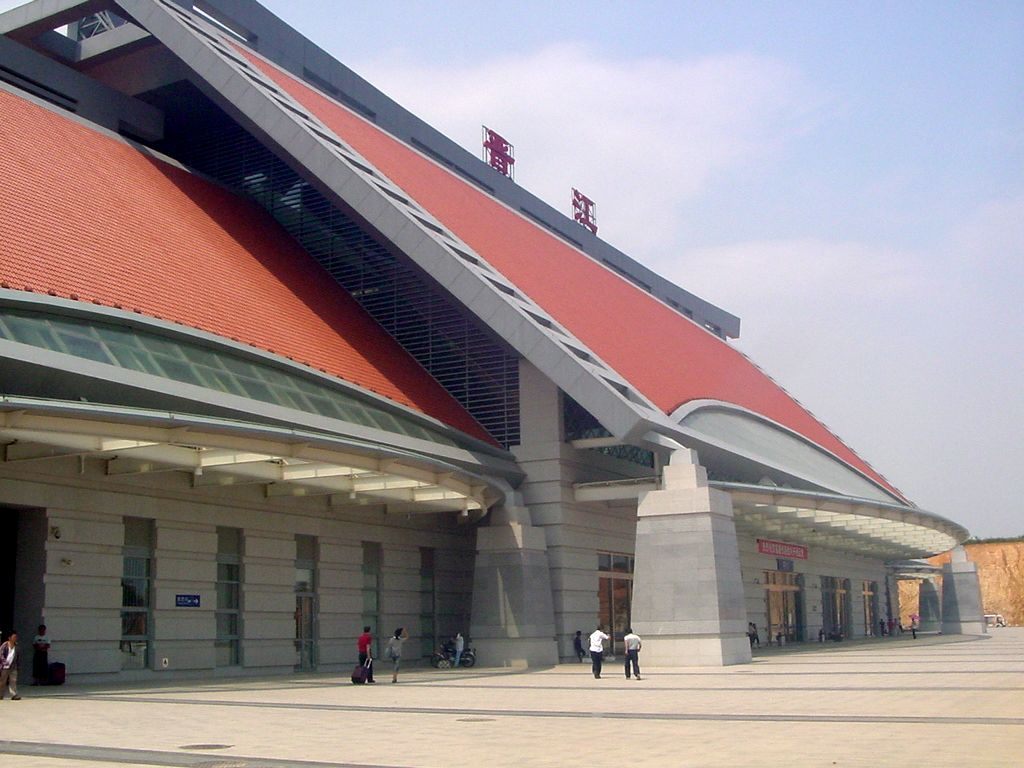
Jinjiang railway station.

Jinjiang hosts the Quanzhou Jinjiang International Airport, IATA code JJN. The facility is of international 4D standard, which is capable of handling mid-size jets, such as Boeing 737 series and Airbus 320 series. Most flights from JJN are domestic flights, with some international/regional flights to/from Hong Kong, Macao, Taipei, Manila, Bangkok, Singapore, etc. Another way to get into the city is flying into Xiamen Gaoqi International Airport in the nearby city Xiamen, which has more international routes, including intercontinental flights to/from Amsterdam, Sydney and Vancouver. From there, passengers can catch limousine buses to downtown Jinjiang in 1.5 hours.

Jinjiang railway station of the new high-speed Fuzhou-Xiamen Railway is located 14 kilometres (8.7 mi) away from the center of the city. Passengers are able to travel to bullet train hubs like Shanghai or Shenzhen in 2 to 3 hours, and further transfer to other destinations national wide. The Jinjiang Railway Station is served by local buses and taxi.

== Economy ==
Thriving with economics in private sectors, Jinjiang has been ranked as No.1 county with the highest GDP in Fujian for over 15 consecutive years. Also, it's been ranked as top 10 richest county-level city in the whole country, as published by the National Bureau of Census. There are many sportswear and other garment and shoe manufacturers in Jinjiang. In 2013, the mayor of Jinjiang called for more focus on innovative design by shoe manufacturers plagued by surplus inventory.

Manufacturers were encouraged by local official to engage in IPOs and seek listings on stock exchanges such as the Frankfurt Stock Exchange to raise global capital for expansion. Raising capital in this way bypasses the difficulty medium-sized firms have with obtaining loans from Chinese banks. About 30 firms have achieved listing on global stock exchanges but many also have listings on stock exchanges in Shanghai or Hong Kong. As of 2012, many additional local firms include IPOs in their business planning.

In some instances over-capacity and declining profit margins have resulted from suboptimal investment of capital. Due to the prevalence of copying in the industry investing capital in research and development seems futile. Another problem is that many of the firms are in fact family-owned business which have taken on corporate form but not best corporate management practices. In an effort to achieve listings on exchanges with strict requirements there is a temptation to engage in creative accounting.

== Climate ==
Climate data for Jinjiang (1981−2010 normals)
Month	Jan	Feb	Mar	Apr	May	Jun	Jul	Aug	Sep	Oct	Nov	Dec	Year
Mean daily maximum °C (°F)	17.0 (62.6)	17.9 (64.2)	20.1 (68.2)	23.6 (74.5)	27.4 (81.3)	29.7 (85.5)	32.7 (90.9)	32.4 (90.3)	31.0 (87.8)	27.3 (81.1)	23.4 (74.1)	19.0 (66.2)	25.1 (77.2)
Mean daily minimum °C (°F)	10.6 (51.1)	11.3 (52.3)	13.1 (55.6)	17.0 (62.6)	21.1 (70.0)	24.3 (75.7)	26.2 (79.2)	26.1 (79.0)	24.7 (76.5)	21.3 (70.3)	17.1 (62.8)	12.6 (54.7)	18.8 (65.8)
Average precipitation mm (inches)	36.3 (1.43)	85.5 (3.37)	111.5 (4.39)	135.4 (5.33)	179.0 (7.05)	215.7 (8.49)	126.6 (4.98)	192.8 (7.59)	142.8 (5.62)	48.3 (1.90)	37.3 (1.47)	27.8 (1.09)	1,339 (52.71)
Average precipitation days (≥ 0.1 mm)	6.9	9.7	13.4	12.9	14.5	13.8	8.8	11.1	8.1	3.6	4.9	6.3	114
Average relative humidity (%)	70	74	75	76	79	83	78	78	73	66	68	67	74
Mean monthly sunshine hours	138.0	113.0	124.4	142.7	156.3	180.7	265.1	229.5	202.5	199.4	157.5	146.7	2,055.8
Percentage possible sunshine	41	35	33	37	38	44	64	58	55	56	48	45	46
Source: China Meteorological Administration (precipitation days, humidity, sunshine 1991–2020)

== Notable people ==
- Zhang Gaoli, a former Vice Premier of the People's Republic of China
- Gong Beibi, internationally awarded actress
- Yao Chen, actress and celebrity
- Henry Sy (1924-2019), Chinese-Filipino businessman, richest man in the Philippines until his death
- Shi Lang (1621–1696), admiral who served under the Ming and Qing dynasties
- Lai Changxing, smuggler
- Dee C. Chuan, Chinese Filipino businessman and philanthropist
- Eugene Chan, linguist
- Cai Chongda, Chinese writer and journalist
- Tony Yang, Chinese businessman in Cagayan de Oro, Philippines
- Liu Xiaoqian, journalist
- Alice Guo (born 1990), former mayor of Bamban, Tarlac

== See also ==
- Chinese diaspora
