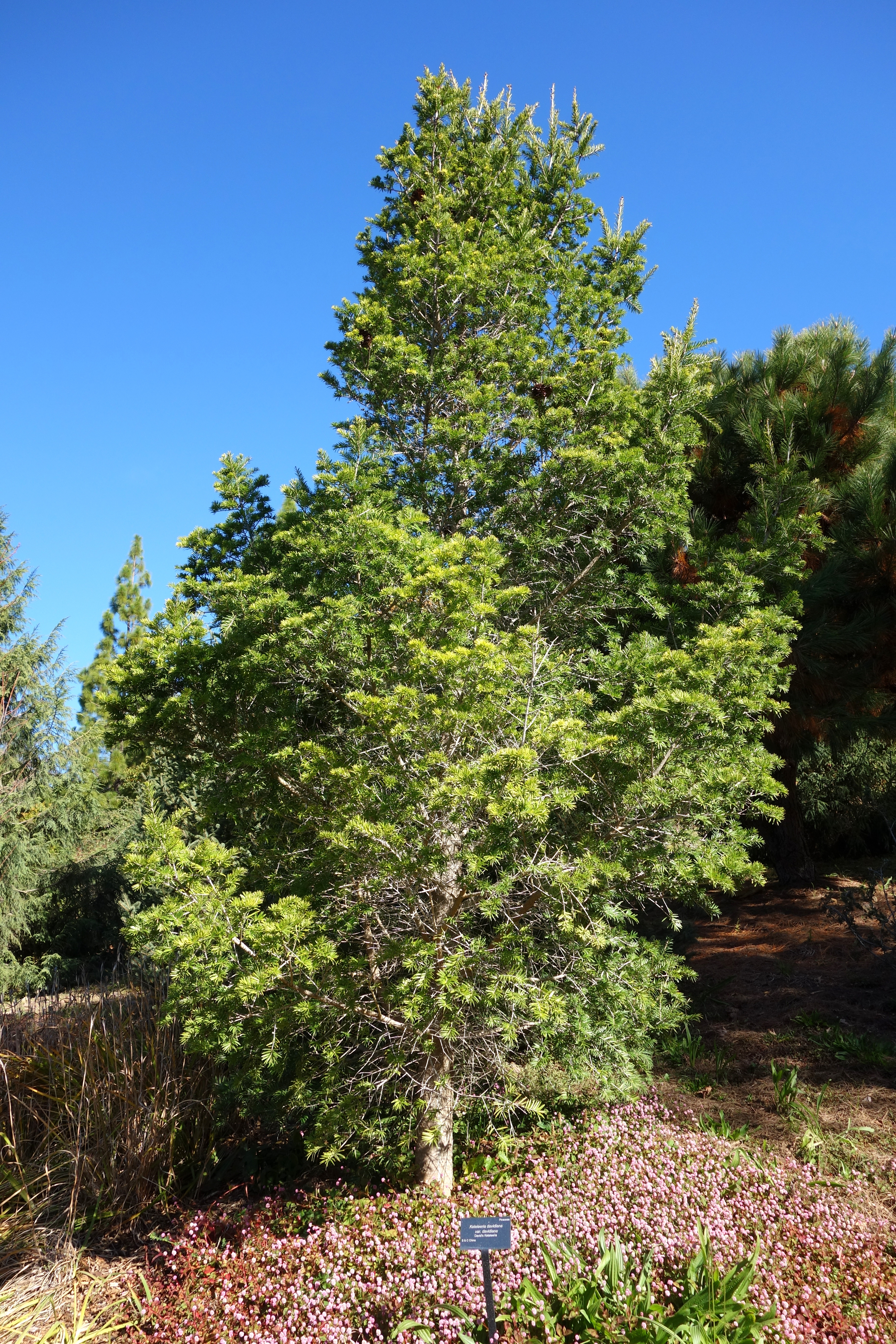
- Young plant in Quarryhill Botanical Garden

Conservation status
- Least Concern (IUCN 3.1)

Scientific classification
- Kingdom: Plantae
- Clade: Tracheophytes
- Clade: Gymnosperms
- Division: Pinophyta
- Class: Pinopsida
- Order: Pinales
- Family: Pinaceae
- Genus: Keteleeria
- Species: K. davidiana

Binomial name
- Keteleeria davidiana (Bertrand) Beissner

= Keteleeria davidiana =

Species of conifer

Keteleeria davidiana (zh: 铁坚油杉) is a coniferous tree in the pine family, Pinaceae, native to Taiwan and southeast China, in the provinces of Gansu, Guangxi, Guizhou, Hubei, Hunan, Shaanxi, Sichuan, and Yunnan. It also occurs in the very northern part of Vietnam. The tree is restricted to hills, mountains, and valleys at elevations of 200–1500 m. Generally, it grows in regions with a more continental climate than the other two Keteleeria species.

The tree reaches 40–50 m in height, developing an irregular oblate crown with large branches. The branchlets have a dense covering of stiff hairs. The bark is dull brown to dark gray-black, and is scaly or flaky. The leaves are needle-like, 2-6.4 cm long by 3.6-4.2 mm broad. They are flat, stiff, and dark shiny green. The cones are light brown, cylindrical, and stand erect on the branches. They are 8–20 cm long and 4–5 cm broad with a stalk 2.5-3.2 cm long. The winged oblong seeds, which mature in October or November, are 13 mm long with a glossy brown wing 12–19 mm long.

Three varieties of the species exist:

- Keteleeria davidiana var. calcarea. Guangxi and Guizhou on calcareous mountains. First-year branchlets yellow. Apices of seed scales blunt and rounded. Winter buds globular.
- Keteleeria davidiana var. davidiana. First-year branchlets yellow-gray or light-gray. Apices of seed scales narrowed. Winter buds ovoid.
- Keteleeria davidiana var. formosana. Endemic on Taiwan, at 300–900 m. Dark leaf scars protruding noticeably on branches. Leaves 2–4 cm long.

The wood is soft and white yellow, and is used for construction, bridges, furniture, and wood fiber.
