= Shishi, Fujian =

Shishi 石狮市
- County-level city
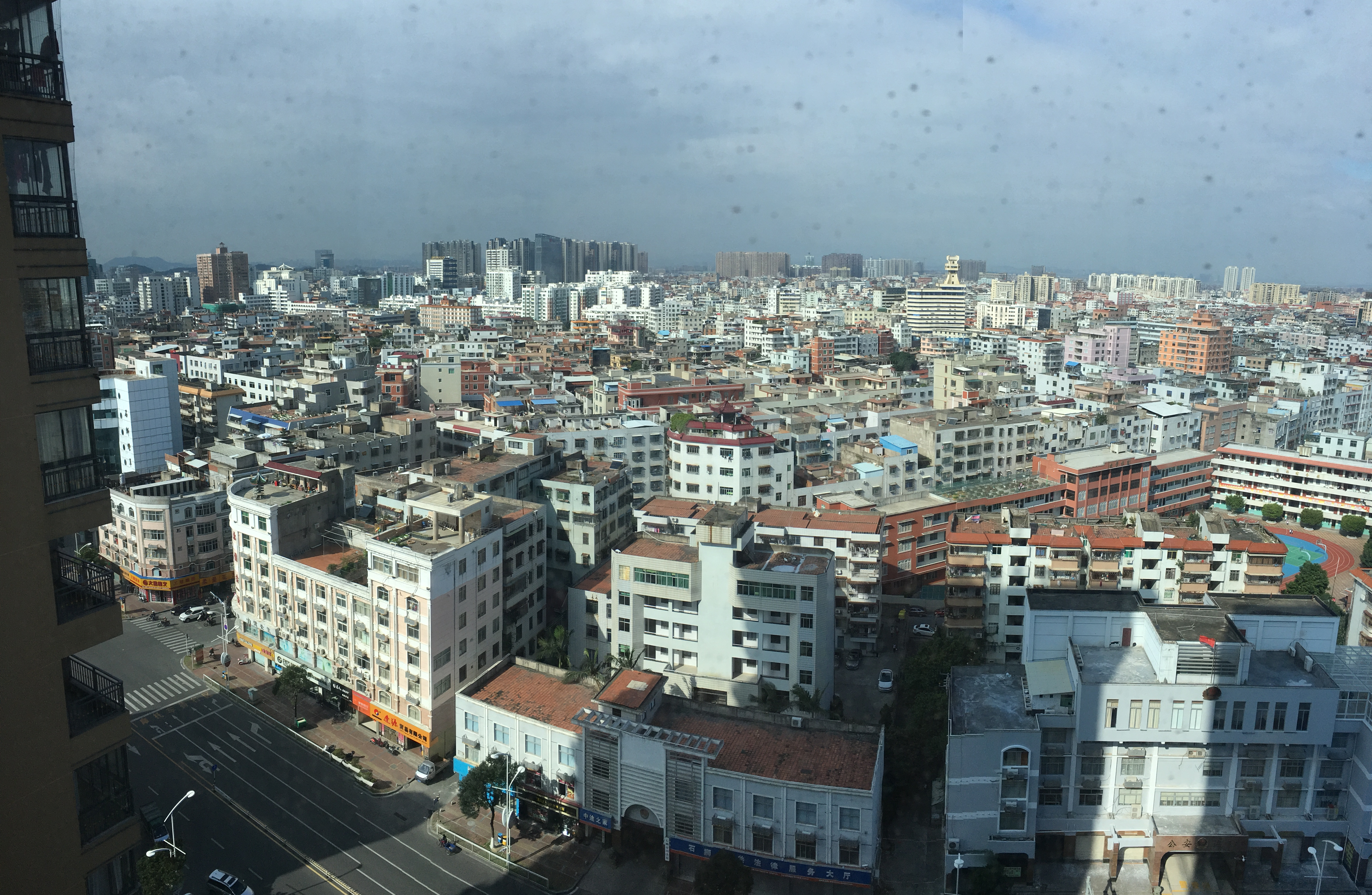

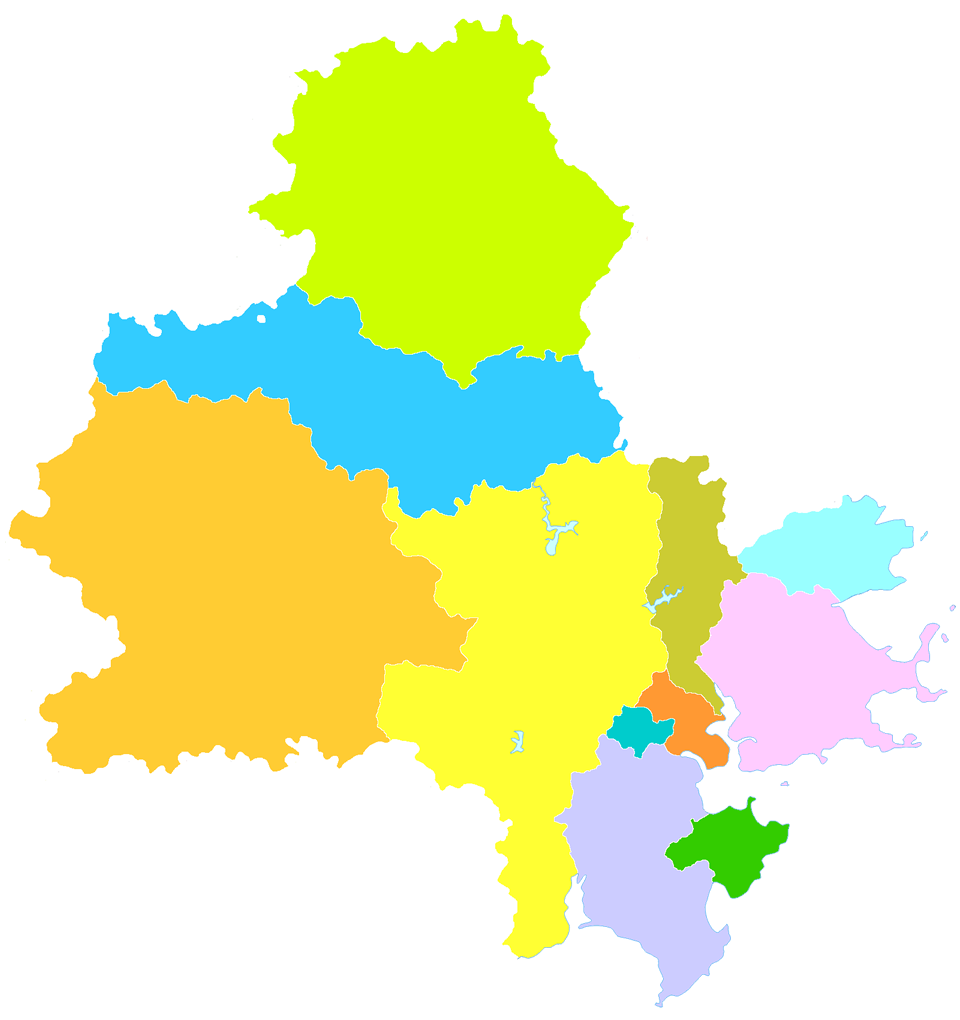
- Shishi in Quanzhou

- Location in Fujian
- Coordinates: 24°43′N 118°42′E
- Country: People's Republic of China
- Province: Fujian
- Prefecture-level city: Quanzhou

Area
  - County-level city: 160.8 km^{2} (62.1 sq mi)

Population (2020)
  - County-level city: 685,930
  - Density: 4,266/km^{2} (11,050/sq mi)
  - Urban: 589,902
- Time zone: UTC+8 (China Standard)
- Area code: 362700

Shishi (Chinese: 石狮; pinyin: Shíshī; Pe̍h-ōe-jī: Chio̍h-sai) is a county-level city under the administration of the prefecture-level city Quanzhou, in Fujian province, People's Republic of China.

The city has an area of 160 square kilometres (62 sq mi) with a population of 685,930 residents in 2020. It is well known for garments trading and industry.

The actress Yao Chen was born in Shishi City.

== Administrative divisions ==
Subdistricts:

- Hubin Subdistrict (湖滨街道), Fengli Subdistrict (凤里街道)

Towns:

- Lingxiu (灵秀镇), Baogai (宝盖镇), Hanjiang (蚶江镇), Yongning (永宁镇), Xiangzhi (祥芝镇), Hongshan (鸿山镇), Jinshang (锦尚镇)
