= Shenhu =

Shenhu 深沪镇
- Town
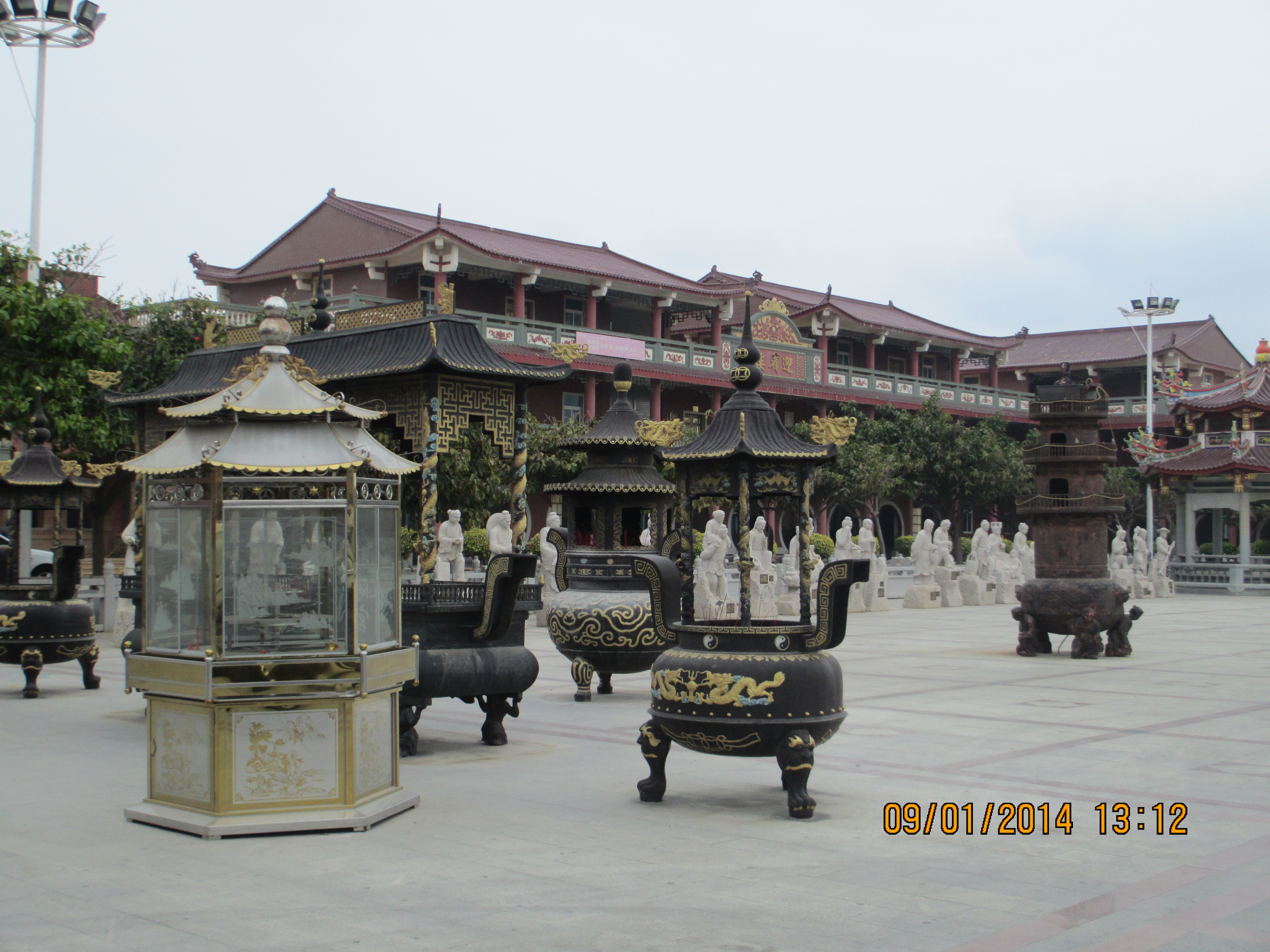
- Grounds of the Zhenhai Palace in Huafeng Village, Shenhu

- Location in Fujian Shenhu (China)
- Coordinates: 24°37′20″N 118°40′42″E
- Country: People's Republic of China
- Province: Fujian
- Prefecture-level city: Quanzhou
- County-level city: Jinjiang
- Elevation: 10 m (33 ft)

Population (2003)
  - Total: 75,095
- Time zone: UTC+8 (China Standard)
- Postal code: 350582105
- Area code: 0595

Shenhu (simplified Chinese: 深沪; traditional Chinese: 深滬; pinyin: Shēnhù) is a town on the southern coast of Fujian province, People's Republic of China. It is under the administration of Jinjiang City, the centre of which is 8 kilometres (5.0 mi) away. It sits on a peninsula, facing the Taiwan Strait to the east and the town of Yongning and Shenhu Bay (深沪湾) to the north. It is a fishing base and trade port, and is home to a number of small appetisers from the Min Nan region. Nearby is the Jinjiang Shenhu Bay National Geopark (晋江深沪湾国家地质公园). There are 7 communities and 12 villages under the town's administration.
