= Lingyuan Subdistrict =

Lingyuan Subdistrict 灵源街道
- Subdistrict
- Interactive map of Lingyuan Subdistrict
- Coordinates: 24°43′51″N 118°32′06″E
- Country: People's Republic of China
- Province: Fujian
- Prefecture-level city: Quanzhou
- County-level city: Jinjiang

Population
  - Total: 25,500
- Time zone: UTC+8 (China Standard)

Lingyuan (simplified Chinese: 灵源; traditional Chinese: 靈源; pinyin: Língyuán; Pe̍h-ōe-jī: Lêng-gôan) is a subdistrict of Jinjiang, Fujian, People's Republic of China. It has a population of 25,500.

It has 10 communities:

- Lingshui (灵水社区)
- Zenglin (曾林社区)
- Dashanhou (大山后社区)
- Dabulin (大布林社区)
- Xiaobulin (小布林社区)
- Linkou (林口社区)
- Zhangqian (张前社区)
- Yingtang (英塘社区)
- Linge (林格社区)
- Xiaowutang (小浯塘社区)
