= Chendai, Quanzhou =

Town in Fujian Province, China

Coordinates: 24.822°N 118.600°E

Chendai (simplified Chinese: 陈埭; traditional Chinese: 陳埭; pinyin: Chéndài; Pe̍h-ōe-jī: Tân-tē / Tân-tāi) is a town within Jinjiang county-level city, Quanzhou prefecture-level city of China's Fujian Province. It is located south of downtown Quanzhou and has an area of 38.4 square kilometres (14.8 sq mi).
