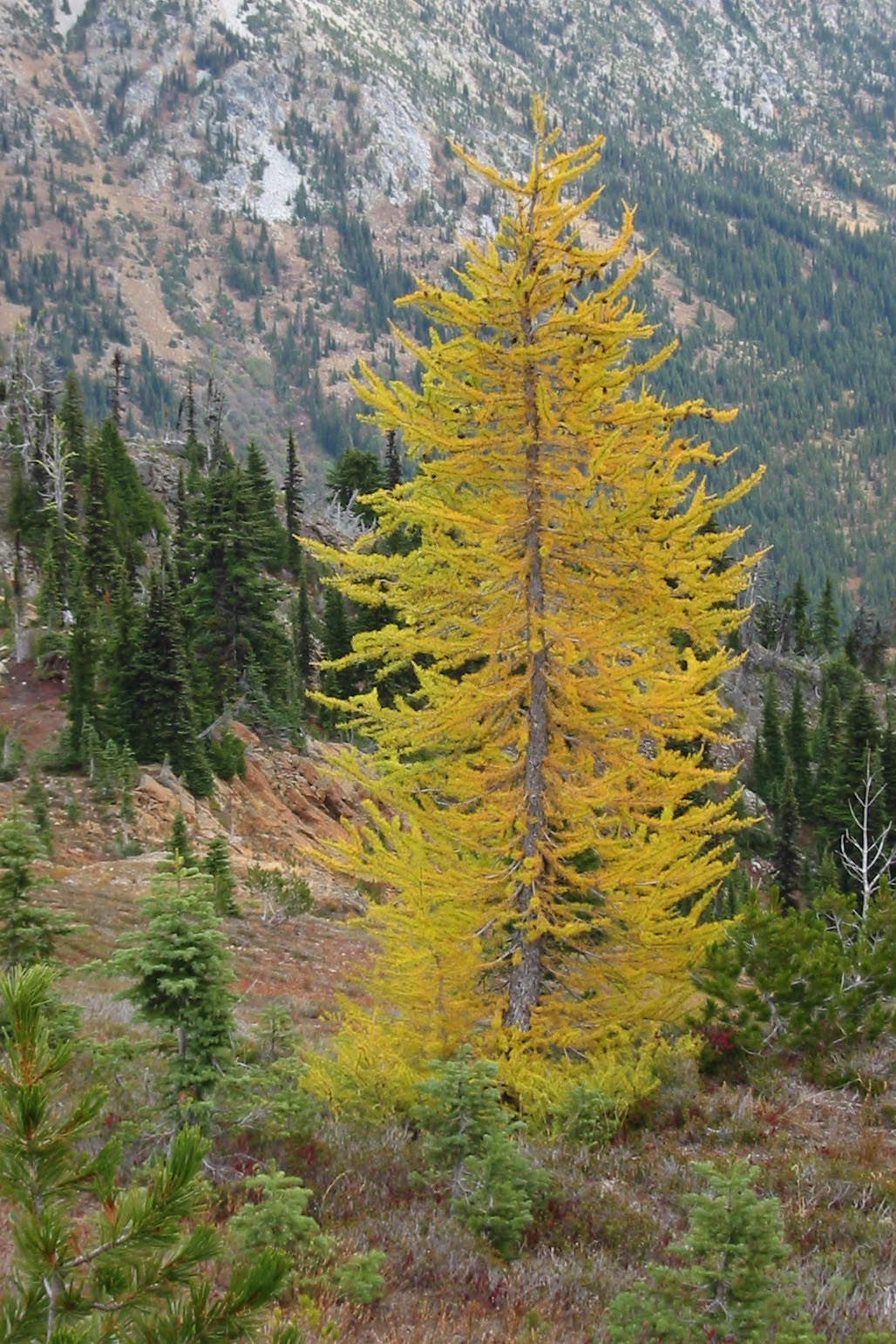
- Subalpine larch (Larix lyallii) in Wenatchee National Forest, Washington, U.S.

Scientific classification
- Kingdom: Plantae
- Clade: Tracheophytes
- Clade: Gymnosperms
- Division: Pinophyta
- Class: Pinopsida
- Order: Pinales
- Family: Pinaceae
- Subfamily: Laricoideae (Rendle) Pilg. & Melch. (1954)

Type genus
- Larix

Genera
- Larix; Pseudotsuga; Cathaya

= Laricoideae =

Subfamily of plants

The Laricoideae are a subfamily of the Pinaceae, a Pinophyta division family. They take their name from the genus Larix (larches), which contains inside most of the species of the group and is one of only two deciduous genera of the pines complex (together with Pseudolarix, which however belongs to a different subfamily, the Abietoideae). Ecologically important trees, the Laricoideae form pure or mixed forest associations often dominant in the ecosystems in which they are present, thanks also to their biological adaptations to natural disturbances, to reproductive strategies put in place and high average longevity of the individuals. Currently are assigned to this subfamily three genera (Larix, Pseudotsuga and Cathaya) and its members can be found only in Northern Hemisphere. The various species live for the most part in temperate or cold climates and are the more northerly conifers; some constitute an important source of timber and non-timber forest products.

== Description ==
The species of the subfamily Laricoideae are evergreen or deciduous trees that can reach the greater heights in the Pinaceae family (over 100 meters with Pseudotsuga menziesii var. menziesii). The leaves are needle-like and have primary stomatal bands only on the abaxial surface (below the phloem vessels). All members are monoecious, with separate sexes on the same plant but in different reproductive structures. The annual cones (strobili) have no distinct umbo and the scales show a broad base which, at observation, completely hides the seeds from the abaxial view. These last are whitish and firmly fixed to the wing (this thin membrane also keeps the seed well attached to the scale during maturation); furthermore, among the typical distinctive features of the group, we have the micropylar fluid of the strobilus absent, no resin vesicles on the seeds and the presence, in the vascular cylinder of the young root, of two characteristic small resiniferous canals. The bark and the wood of the genera Larix and Pseudotsuga have a similar anatomy and morphology: the reddish color of the heartwood and the white-yellowish of the sapwood, the high specific weight compared to other conifers, the distribution of late and earlywood, the presence of resiniferous channels and their localization in the tissuets, the molecules that form the resin and extractives, the chemical, physical and mechanical properties as well as the class of resistance to the attack of pathogens such as fungi and insects are a clue of a common ancestral origin. Similar between the two genera are also some aspects of the phenology, the degree of shade tolerance, the fire-resistant marbled bark and the appearance of the young shoots.

== Taxonomy ==
The subfamily Laricoideae was described with the actual name by Robert Knud Friedrich Pilger and Hans Melchior in late 1954 and subsequently modified by other authors in the course of time as regards the taxa of belonging. Before that, the genera Larix, Pseudotsuga and Cedrus were gathered in a provisional subfamily called Laricinae, defined for the first time by Melchior and Werdermann always in 1954 (...“trees that have both short and long shoots, monomorphic leaves, and strobili borne on the short shoots”...) and rechristened immediately after with the current term. The grouping in this form was confirmed by Hart (1987) through cladistic analysis, but already in 1988 Frankis replaced Cedrus with Cathaya (a genus described for the first time in 1962) in a new classification (now obsolete) that saw Larix as a distinct twin group compared to Cathaya - Pseudotsuga.

Historically the Laricoideae were the subfamily of the Pinaceae comprising the trees with needles inserted both on the macroblasts and on the brachiblasts; for this reason in the past they have been also included in it the genera Pseudolarix (for a short time) and Cedrus, subsequently eliminated following the most recent systematic updates developed on the basis of molecular genetic phylogeny, reproductive morphology, chromosome numbers and immunology. Currently, based on these studies, there are three genera in the subfamily Laricoideae, of which one of which is monotypic as it consists of only one species:

Image	Genus	Description	Living species
	Larix Mill.	Larches are the genus type of this subfamily. Deciduous trees, they live in cold climates at elevate altitude in the mountains of temperate zones or at high latitudes in the Northern Hemisphere. They are found in North America, Central Europe and Northern Asia (Russia, Japan and China).	Larix laricina (Du Roi) K. Koch; Larix lyallii Parl.; Larix occidentalis Nutt.; Larix decidua Mill. (syn. L. europaea D.C.) – European larch; Larix sibirica Ledeb. – Siberian larch; Larix gmelinii (Rupr.) Kuzen. (syn. L. dahurica) – Dahurian larch; Larix kaempferi (Lamb.) Carr. (syn. L. leptolepis) – Japanese larch; Larix × czekanowskii Szafer; Larix potaninii Batalin – Chinese larch; Larix mastersiana Rehder & E.H.Wilson – Masters' larch; Larix griffithii Hook.f. (syn. L. griffithiana) – Himalayan larch
	Pseudotsuga Carrière	Douglas-firs are medium to extremely large trees and often resemble morphologically as species of Abies or Tsuga. Have cones pendulous with persistent scales and three-pointed bract sticking out from the structure. They are found in the temperate mountains of North America and Eastern Asia, where they can reach 100 m in height (Pseudotsuga menziesii var. menziesii).	Pseudotsuga macrocarpa (Vasey) Mayr – Bigcone Douglas-fir, spontaneous in mountains of Southern California.; Pseudotsuga menziesii (Mirb.) Franco - Western North America from Central British Columbia to Mexico (Oaxaca): Pseudotsuga menziesii var. menziesii – Coast Douglas-fir; Pseudotsuga menziesii var. glauca (Beissn.) Franco – Rocky Mountain Douglas-fir; Pseudotsuga menziesii var. lindleyana (Roezl) Carrière – Mexican Douglas-fir; Pseudotsuga brevifolia W.C.Cheng & L.K.Fu – Short-leaf Chinese Douglas-fir; Pseudotsuga forrestii Craib – Yunnan Douglas-fir; Pseudotsuga japonica (Shiras.) Beissn. – Japanese Douglas-fir; Pseudotsuga sinensis Dode – Chinese Douglas-fir: Pseudotsuga sinensis var. sinensis; Pseudotsuga sinensis var. wilsoniana – Taiwan Douglas-fir; Pseudotsuga sinensis var. gaussenii
	Cathaya Chun & Kuang	Monotypic genus with only one species: Cathaya argyrophylla. The leaves are needle-like, evergreen, 2.5–5 cm long with ciliates margins when young; they grow in spiral patterns around sprig. Cones 3–5 cm long with 15-20 scales, each scale bearing two winged seeds. This conifer grows in Southern China, in provinces of Guangxi, Guizhou, Hunan and southeast Sichuan on steep mountain slopes between the 950 and 1800 m of altitude.	Cathaya argyrophylla Chun & Kuang

Within the subfamily the genera Larix and Pseudotsuga are more closely correlated to each other (sister taxa) than Cathaya. This evidence is demonstrated by numerous biological and macro-micro morphological similarities between the larches and the Douglas-firs including, but not only, a various tissues common anatomy, immunology of seed protein and the absence of the two air sacs in the pollen, typicals instead of the other Pinaceae. The similarities between the pollen grains of the genera Larix and Pseudotsuga however do not stop here and include other aspects as: granules not buoyant, atectate, with external wall (exospore) granular, pollination drop containing xylose and the presence of an exine shell during microgametophyte germination. Doyle and O'Leary (1935) furthermore described a pollination process very similar in Larix and Pseudotsuga where the granule, which lacks air sacs, lands on an almost stigmatic extension of the integument, the margins of which tend to inroll. The contact with the nucellus may (Larix) or may not (Pseudotsuga) be needed for pollen tubes to develop, but the mechanism is almost analogous. The time from pollination to fertilization in these two genera may be over a year and the granules germination can take months (Little et al., 2014).

Price et al. he supposed in 1977 that the Laricoideae were a subfamily sister of the Abietoideae rather than the Pinoideae - Piceoideae group and this version was confirmed by Hart (1987), Frankis (1988), Farjon (1990), Wang et al. (2000) and Gernandt et al. (2008), although it has not yet found application in the literature.

=== Dichotomous key ===
The dichotomous key to recognizing the genera included to the subfamily Laricoideae is relatively simple, since only three of them belong to it and one of these is deciduous. Below is reported the taxonomic identification scheme in the form of a table:

1. Laricoideae (includes Larix, Pseudotsuga and Cathaya): 2

2. Deciduous trees............................ Larix
2. Evergreen trees: 3

3. Medium to extremely large trees; often resemble species of Abies or Tsuga; cones pendulous, persistent scales, three-pointed bract sticking out between scales............................ Pseudotsuga
3. Leaves needle-like, 2.5-5 cm long, ciliate margins when young, grow in spiral patterns around stem; cones 3-5 cm long, 15-20 scales, each scale bearing two winged seeds............................ Cathaya argyrophylla

=== Revisions ===
The genus Cathaya can be attributed to the grouping of pines (subfamily Pinoideae), leaving therefore only Larix and Pseudotsuga to form the subfamily Laricoideae. Furthermore, studying the mitochondrial rps3 gene, Ran et al. (2010) found that Larix and Pseudotsuga are evolutionarily sister genera to all other Pinaceae, highlighting a different (sub-parallel) origin compared than the remaining species. Spellenberg, Earle and Nelson (2014) report that the larches and Douglas firs evolved from the Pinaceae 135 million years ago and they kept a common ancestor until 7 million years ago, thus forming a divided and closely related taxonomic line between them compared to the rest of the group, while maintaining a strong degree of kinship with it. For Wang et al. (2000), instead, Pseudotsuga differentiated himself from Larix in Western North America about 65 million years ago, in an era between the late Cretaceous and the Paleocene. These revisions and interactions, which would find evidence in genetics, however are not universally accepted and many botanics, researchers and scientists still use the previous classification waiting for further developments.

For other authors, finally, the subfamily Laricoideae would have no taxonomic dignity of its own, recognizing only two large multi-group clades (Pinoid and Abietoid) or subfamilies (Pinoideae and Abietoideae) in their cladistics systems. Larix, Pseudotsuga and Cathaya would be included in the pines complex.

== See also ==
- Pinaceae
  - Abietoideae
  - Pinoideae
  - Piceoideae
- Larix
- Pseudotsuga
- Cathaya
- Subfamily
