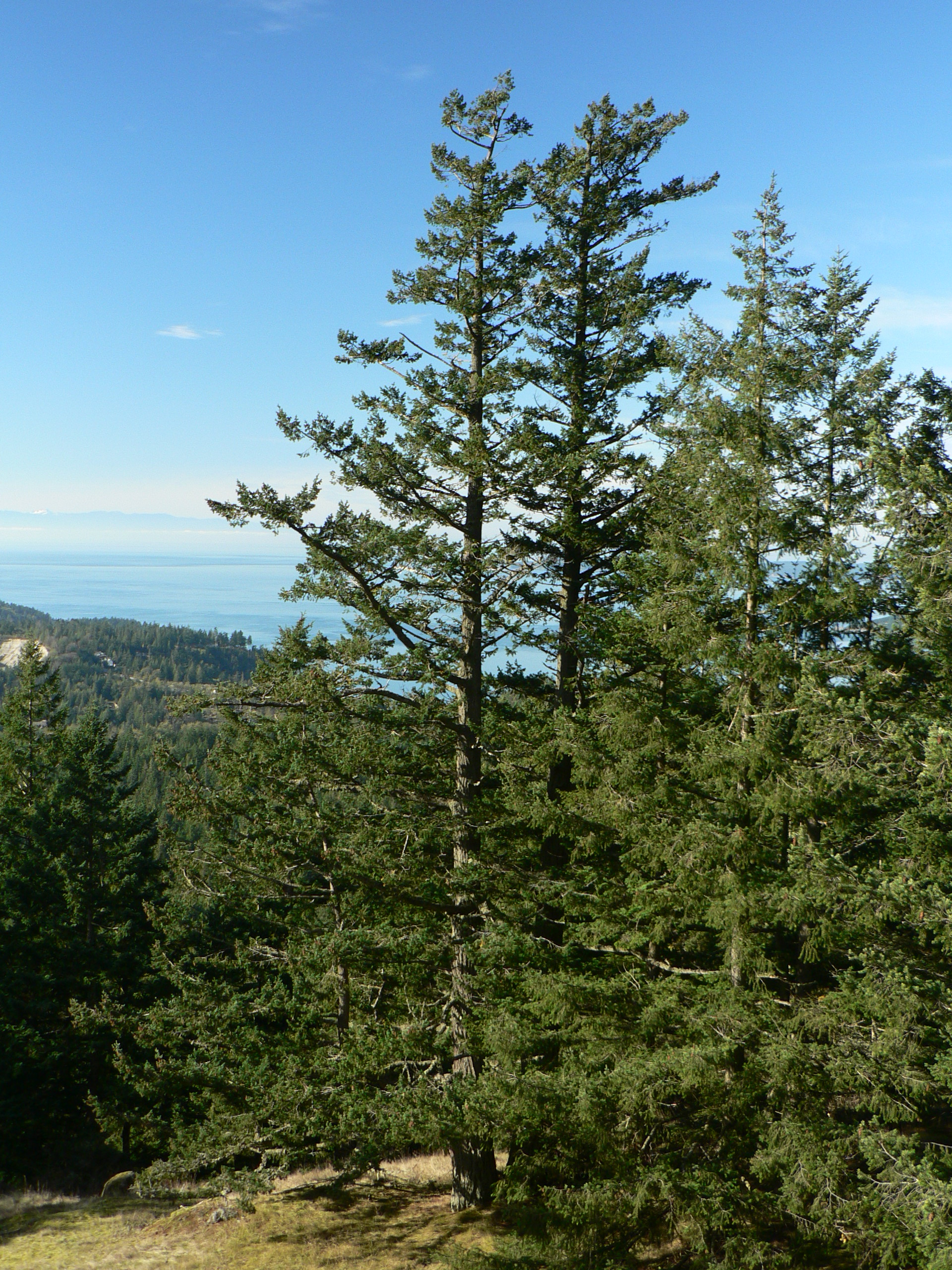
- Pseudotsuga menziesii var. menziesii in Anacortes Community Forest Lands, Washington

Scientific classification
- Kingdom: Plantae
- Clade: Tracheophytes
- Clade: Gymnosperms
- Division: Pinophyta
- Class: Pinopsida
- Order: Pinales
- Family: Pinaceae
- Subfamily: Laricoideae
- Genus: Pseudotsuga; Carrière

Type species
- Pseudotsuga douglasii (Lindl.) Carrière

Species
- See text

Synonyms
- Abietia Kent

= Pseudotsuga =

Genus of conifers in the family Pinaceae

Pseudotsuga (/ˌsjuːdoʊˈtsuːɡə/) is a genus of coniferous trees in the pine family, Pinaceae (subfamily Laricoideae). Common names for species in the genus include Douglas fir, Douglas-fir, Douglas tree, Oregon pine and Bigcone spruce. Pseudotsuga menziesii (Douglas fir proper) is widespread in western North America and is an important source of timber. The number of species has long been debated, but two in western North America and two to four in eastern Asia are commonly acknowledged.

Nineteenth-century botanists had problems in classifying Douglas firs, due to the species' similarity to various other conifers better known at the time; they have at times been classified in Pinus, Picea, Abies, Tsuga, and even Sequoia. Because of their distinctive cones, Douglas firs were finally placed in the new genus Pseudotsuga (meaning "false hemlock") by the French botanist Carrière in 1867.

== Name ==
The tree takes its English name from David Douglas, the Scottish botanist who introduced Pseudotsuga menziesii into cultivation at Scone Palace in 1827. Douglas is known for introducing many native American tree species to Europe. The hyphenated form "Douglas-fir" is used by some to indicate that Pseudotsuga species are not true firs, which belong to the genus Abies.

== Description ==
Douglas-firs are medium-size to extremely large coniferous trees, 20–120 metres (70–390 ft) tall (although only coast Douglas-firs reach such great height). The leaves are flat, soft, linear, 2–4 centimetres (0.8–1.6 in) long, generally resembling those of the firs, occurring singly rather than in fascicles; they completely encircle the branches, which can be useful in recognizing the species. The female cones are pendulous, with persistent scales (unlike true firs), and are distinctive in having a long tridentine (three-pointed) bract that protrudes prominently above each scale (it resembles the back half of a mouse, with two feet and a tail).

Pseudotsuga menziesii var. menziesii has attained heights of 393 feet (120* m). That was the estimated height of the tallest conifer ever well-documented, the Mineral Tree (Mineral, Washington), measured in 1924 by Dr. Richard E. McArdle, former chief of the U.S. Forest Service. The volume of that tree was 515 cubic metres (18,190 cu ft). The tallest living individual is the Brummitt (Doerner) Fir in Coos County, Oregon, 99.4 metres (326 ft) tall. Only coast redwood and Eucalyptus regnans reach greater heights based on current knowledge of living trees: 379 and 331 feet (116 and 101* m), respectively. At Quinault, Washington, is found a collection of the largest Douglas-firs in one area. Quinault Rain Forest hosts most of the top ten known largest Douglas-firs.

As of 2009, the largest known Douglas-firs in the world were, by volume:

1. Red Creek Tree (Red Creek, SW British Columbia) 12,320 cubic feet (349 m^{3})
2. Queets Fir (Queets River Valley-Olympic National Park) 11,710 cubic feet (332 m^{3})
3. Tichipawa (Quinault Lake Rain Forest-Olympic National Park) 10,870 cubic feet (308 m^{3})
4. Rex (Quinault Lake Rain Forest-Olympic National Park) 10,200 cubic feet (290 m^{3})
5. Ol' Jed (Jedediah Smith Redwoods State Park) 10,040 cubic feet (284 m^{3})
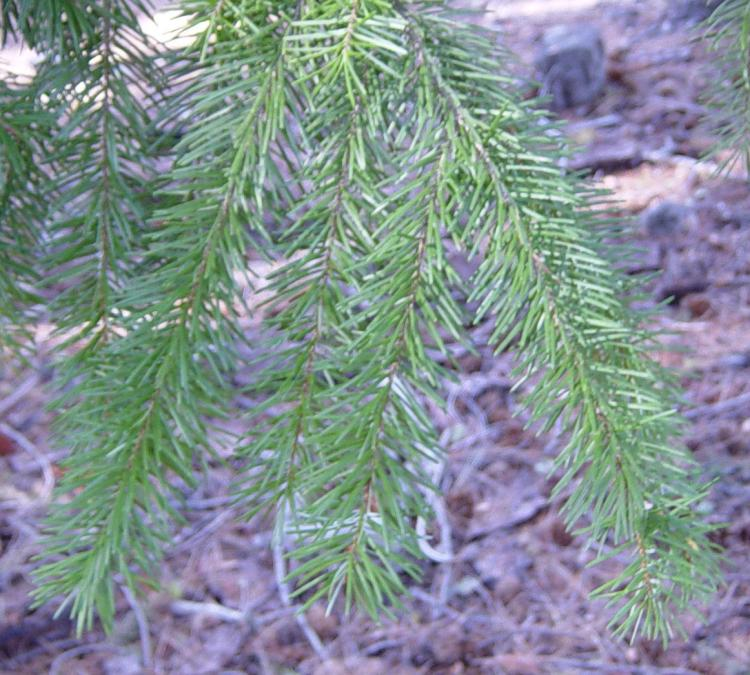
Coast Douglas-fir branch

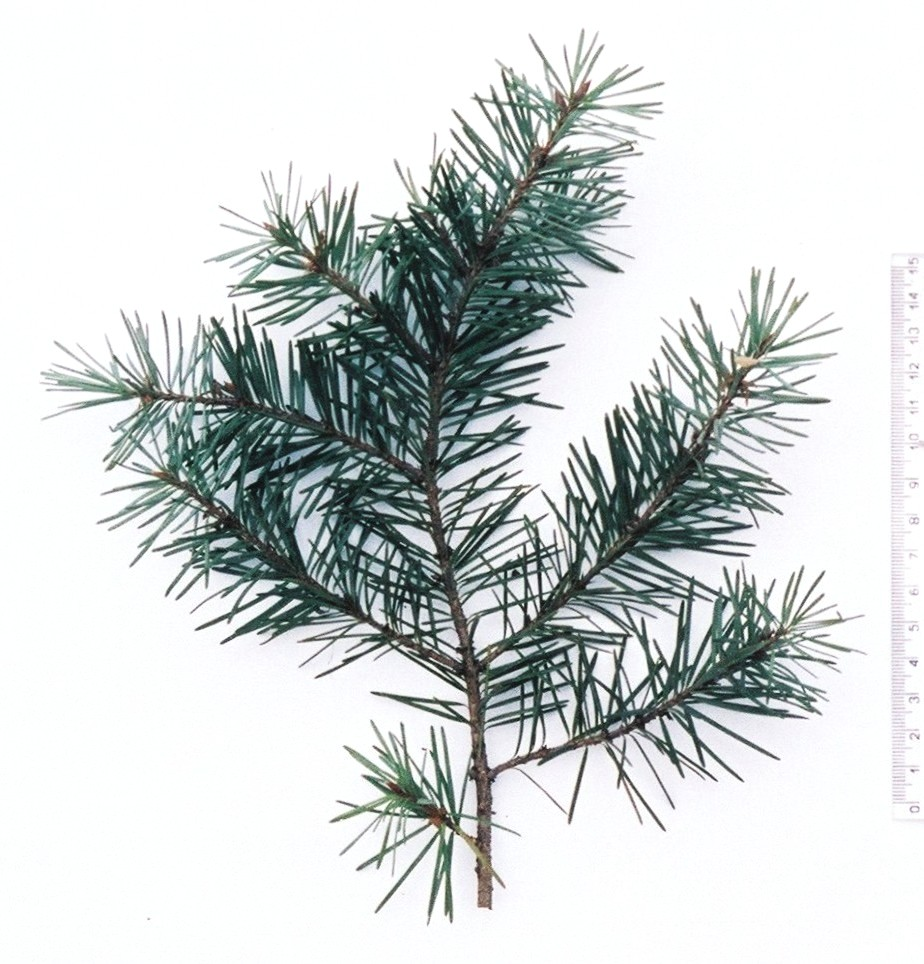
Rocky Mountain Douglas-fir twig

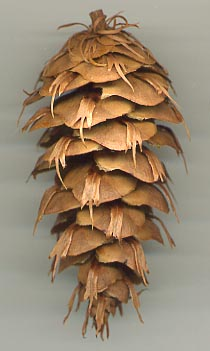
Coast Douglas-fir seed cone, from a tree grown from seed collected by David Douglas

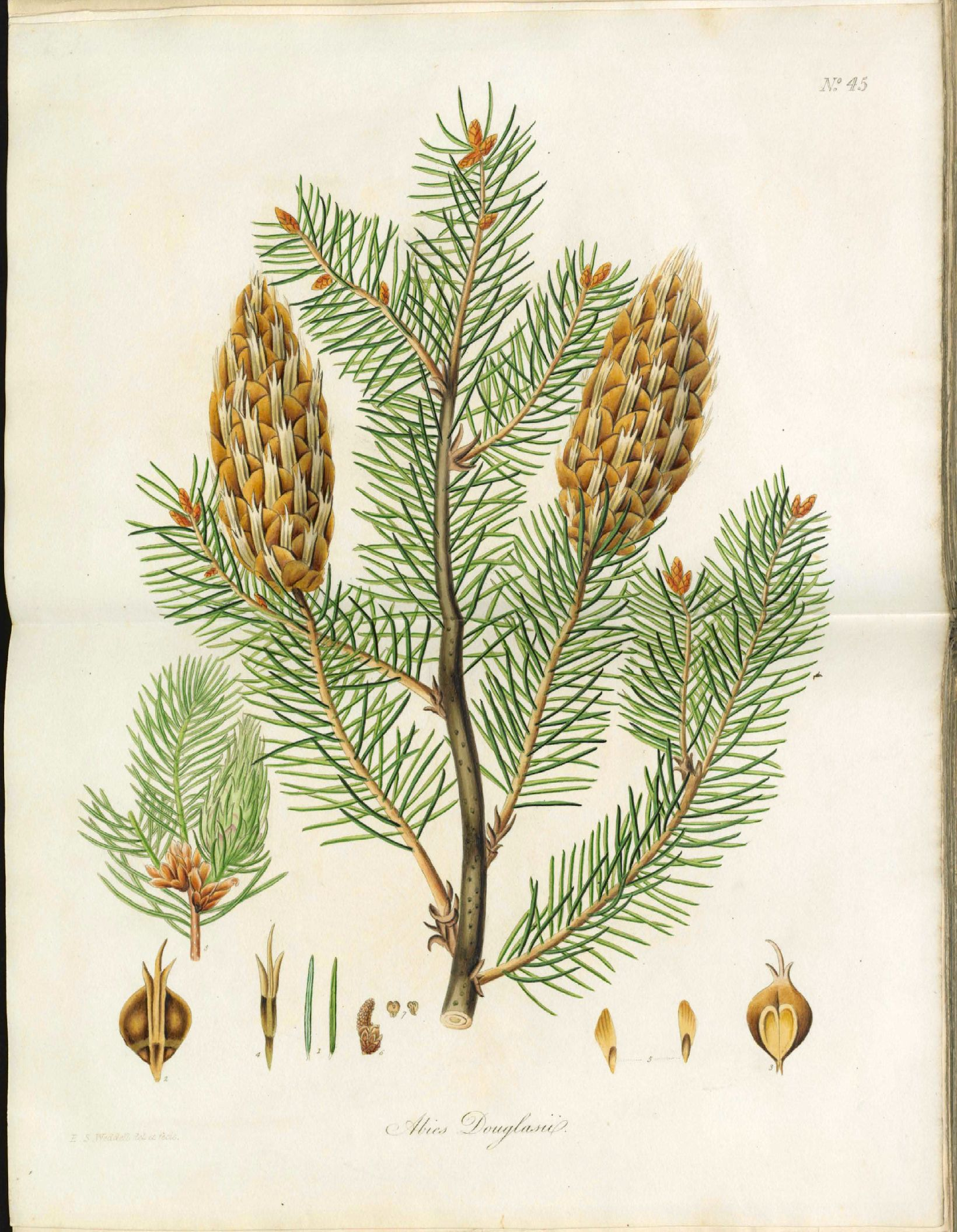
Botanical illustration

== Taxonomy ==
The Pseudotsuga genus belongs to the Pinaceae family, a major lineage of conifers. A 2018 study divided Pinaceae into two clades with Pseudotsuga placed in the Pinoid clade (along with Larix, Cathaya, Cedrus, Nothotsuga and Pseudolarix), the other clade being Abietoids. A study on chloroplast genomics from 2010 reports that Pseudotsuga and Larix (Larches) are closely related and form a clade within Pinoids. These two genus share certain pollen structures, reproductive mechanisms, certain microscopic bark cell structures, and their chromosomes have similar shapes and proportions.

Phylogeny of Pseudotsuga according to Stull 2021:

- Pseudotsuga
  - P. sinensis Dode
  - - P. menziesii (de Mirbel) Franco
    - - P. japonica (Shirasawa) Beissner
      - P. macrocarpa (Vasey) Mayr

By far the best-known is the widespread and abundant North American species Pseudotsuga menziesii, a taxonomically complex species divided into two major varieties (treated as distinct species or subspecies by some botanists): coast Douglas-fir or "green Douglas-fir", on the Pacific coast; and Rocky Mountain Douglas-fir or "interior Douglas-fir", in the interior west of the continent. According to some botanists, Rocky Mountain Douglas-fir extends south into Mexico to include all Mexican Douglas-fir populations, whereas others have proposed multiple separate species in Mexico and multiple varieties in the United States. Morphological and genetic evidence suggest that Mexican Douglas-fir should probably be considered a distinct variety within P. menziesii.

All of the other species are of restricted range and little-known outside of their respective native environments, where they are often rare and of scattered occurrence in mixed forests; all those have unfavorable conservation status. The taxonomy of the Asian Douglas-firs continues to be disputed, but the most recent taxonomic treatment accepts four species: three Chinese and one Japanese. The three Chinese species have been variously considered varieties of P. sinensis or broken down into additional species and varieties. In the current treatment, the Chinese species P. sinensis is further subdivided into two varieties: var. sinensis and var. wilsoniana.

=== North America ===
- Pseudotsuga macrocarpa (Vasey) Mayr bigcone Douglas-fir – southern California
- Pseudotsuga menziesii (Mirb.) Franco – western North America from Alaska to Oaxaca
  - Pseudotsuga menziesii var. menziesii coast Douglas-fir
  - Pseudotsuga menziesii var. glauca (Beissn.) Franco Rocky Mountain Douglas-fir
  - Pseudotsuga menziesii var. lindleyana (Roezl) Carrière Mexican Douglas-fir

=== Asia ===
- Pseudotsuga brevifolia W.C.Cheng & L.K.Fu short-leaf Chinese Douglas-fir
- Pseudotsuga forrestii Craib Yunnan Douglas-fir
- Pseudotsuga japonica (Shiras.) Beissn. Japanese Douglas-fir
- Pseudotsuga sinensis Dode Chinese Douglas-fir
  - Pseudotsuga sinensis var. sinensis
  - Pseudotsuga sinensis var. wilsoniana Taiwan Douglas-fir
  - Pseudotsuga sinensis var. gaussenii

=== Formerly placed in Pseudotsuga ===
- Keteleeria davidiana (Bertrand) Beissn. (as P. davidiana Bertrand)
- Cathaya argyrophylla (as P. argyrophylla)
- Keteleeria fortunei (as P. fortunei)
- Abies magnifica (as P. magnifica)
- Abies procera (as P. nobilis)

== Uses ==
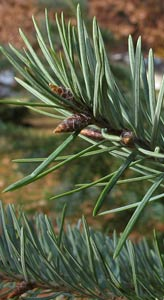
The buds of a coast Douglas-fir

Douglas-fir wood is used for structural applications that are required to withstand high loads. It is used extensively in the construction industry. Other examples include its use for homebuilt aircraft such as the RJ.03 IBIS canard. Very often, these aircraft were designed to utilize Sitka spruce, which is becoming increasingly difficult to source in aviation quality grades. Oregon pine is also used in boat building when it is available in long, fairly knot-free lengths. Most timber now comes from plantation forests in North America which are managed to produce faster growing timber with fewer knots. This timber is generally lighter but weaker. Traditionally, Oregon pine was used in mast building due to its ability to resist bending loads without fracturing. This was based on using older native forest wood with a high number of growth rings per inch. This sort of wood is seldom available new but can be sourced from merchants dealing in recycled timber. Native Oregon pine is considerably heavier than Sitka spruce, which is about the same weight as western red cedar, but with far better bending characteristics than cedar. Large-sized Oregon pine, as used in beams, is inclined to split as it dries, like oak, but this does not reduce its strength.

Douglas-fir is one of the most commonly marketed Christmas tree species in the United States, where they are sold alongside firs like noble fir and grand fir. Douglas-fir Christmas trees are usually trimmed to a near perfect cone instead of left to grow naturally like noble and grand firs.

== Pests and diseases ==
Douglas-firs are used as food plants by the larvae of some Lepidoptera species, including autumnal moth, bordered white, engrailed moth, pine beauty and turnip moth. The gelechiids Chionodes abella and Chionodes periculella and the tortrix moth Cydia illutana have been specifically recorded on P. menziesii.

== Culture ==
A California Native American myth explains that each three-ended bract is the tail and two tiny legs of a mouse that hid inside the scales of the tree's cones during forest fires, and the tree was kind enough to be its enduring sanctuary.

A Douglas-fir species, Pseudotsuga menziesii, is the state tree of Oregon and is also used as a symbol of the Cascadia Movement, being pictured on the Doug Flag.
