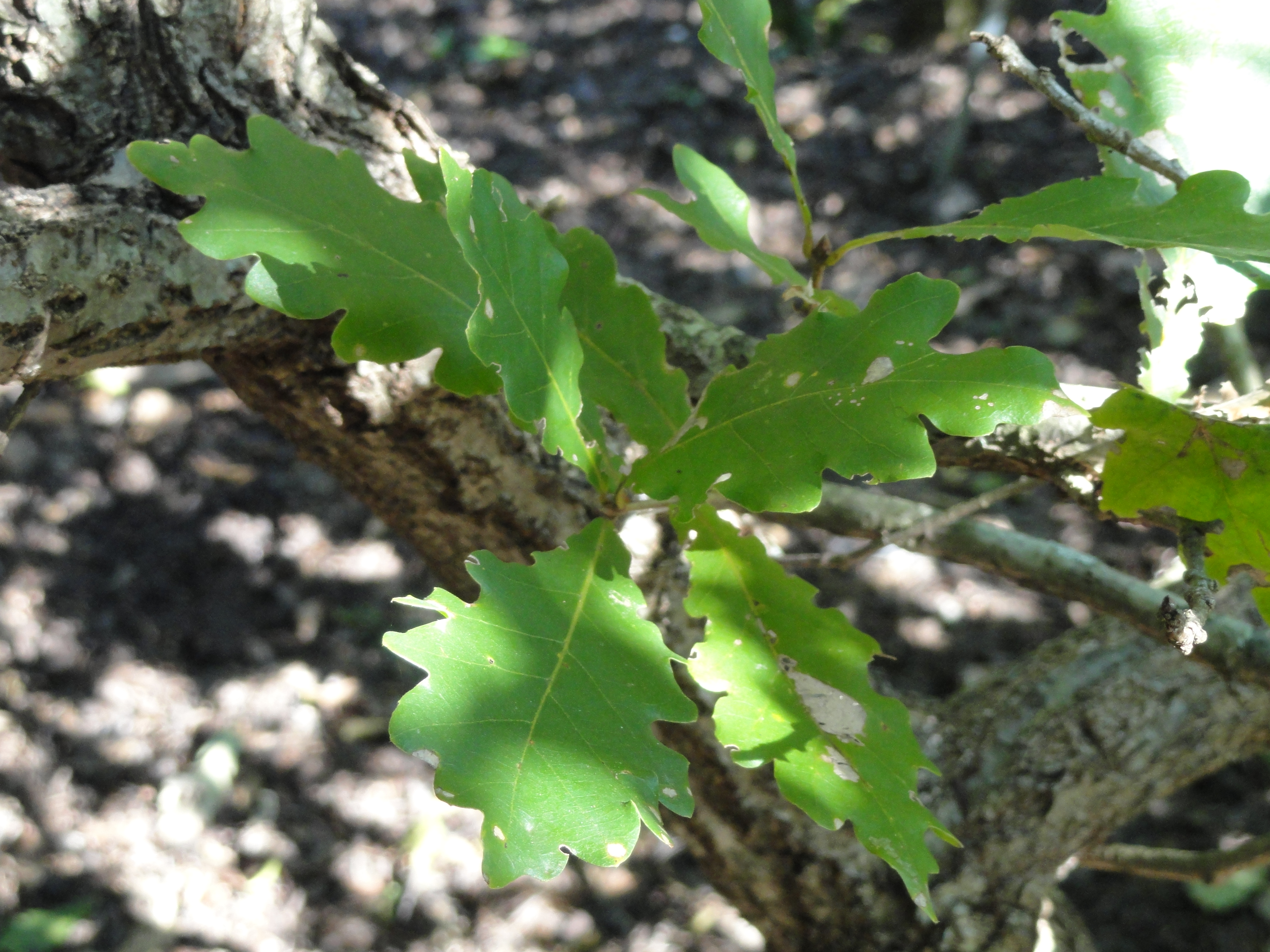

Conservation status
- Least Concern (IUCN 3.1)

Scientific classification
- Kingdom: Plantae
- Clade: Embryophytes
- Clade: Tracheophytes
- Clade: Spermatophytes
- Clade: Angiosperms
- Clade: Eudicots
- Clade: Rosids
- Order: Fagales
- Family: Fagaceae
- Genus: Quercus
- Subgenus: Quercus subg. Quercus
- Section: Quercus sect. Quercus
- Species: Q. wutaishanica

Binomial name
- Quercus wutaishanica Mayr

Synonyms
- Quercus funebris H.Lév. ex Nakai; Quercus liaotungensis f. capillata Kozlov; Quercus liaotungensis f. funebris Nakai; Quercus liaotungensis f. glabra Nakai; Quercus liaotungensis var. heterophylla A.Camus; Quercus liaotungensis f. undulatifolia Nakai; Quercus undulatifolia H.Lév. ex Nakai

= Quercus wutaishanica =

Species of flowering plant

Quercus wutaishanica, the Liaoning oak, is a species of oak tree native to northern, central, and southern China, Mongolia, northeastern Tibet, and Primorsky Krai in the Russian Far East. It is the dominant species in the forest of the Loess Plateau. It is placed in section Quercus.
