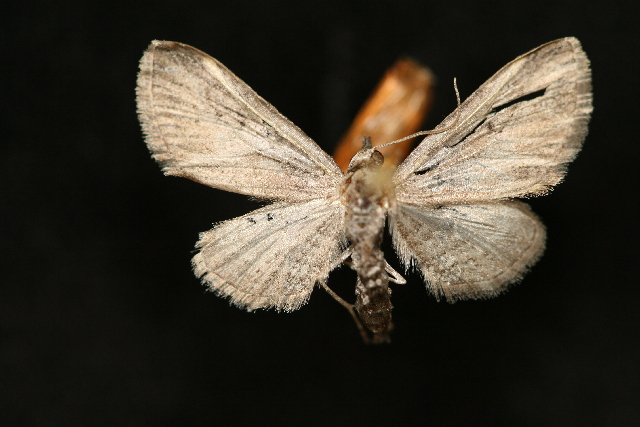

Scientific classification
- Domain: Eukaryota
- Kingdom: Animalia
- Phylum: Arthropoda
- Class: Insecta
- Order: Lepidoptera
- Family: Geometridae
- Genus: Eupithecia
- Species: E. placidata

Binomial name
- Eupithecia placidata Taylor, 1908

= Eupithecia placidata =

Species of moth

Eupithecia placidata is a moth in the family Geometridae first described by Taylor in 1908. It is found in western North America from British Columbia south to California.

The wingspan is about 20 mm. Adults have been recorded on wing from February to October.

The larvae feed on Juniperus scopulorum, Juniperus communis, Thuja plicata, Populus balsamifera trichocarpa, Pinus strobus, Pinus contorta var. latifolia, Pseudotsuga menziesii var. glauca, Abies lasiocarpa, Tsuga heterophylla and Betula papyrifera.
