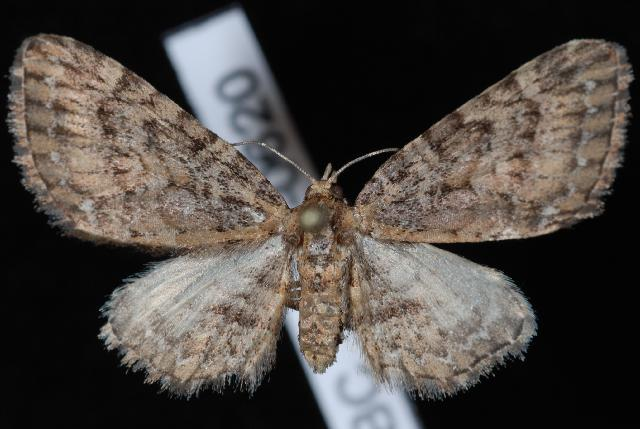

Scientific classification
- Kingdom: Animalia
- Phylum: Arthropoda
- Clade: Pancrustacea
- Class: Insecta
- Order: Lepidoptera
- Family: Geometridae
- Genus: Eupithecia
- Species: E. longipalpata

Binomial name
- Eupithecia longipalpata Packard, 1876

= Eupithecia longipalpata =

Species of moth

Eupithecia longipalpata is a moth in the family Geometridae. It is found in western British Columbia to northern California.

Adult specimens' wingspan is 23–26 mm, which differentiates them from other members of the palpata group.

The larvae feed on the needles of Abies grandis, Abies amabilis, Abies lasiocarpa, Pseudotsuga menziesii and Pseudotsuga menziesii var. glauca, Tsuga heterophylla, Tsuga mertensiana, Thuja plicata, Picea sitchensis and Pinus contorta var. latifolia. Full-grown larvae reach a length of 20 mm. There are two colour morphs.
