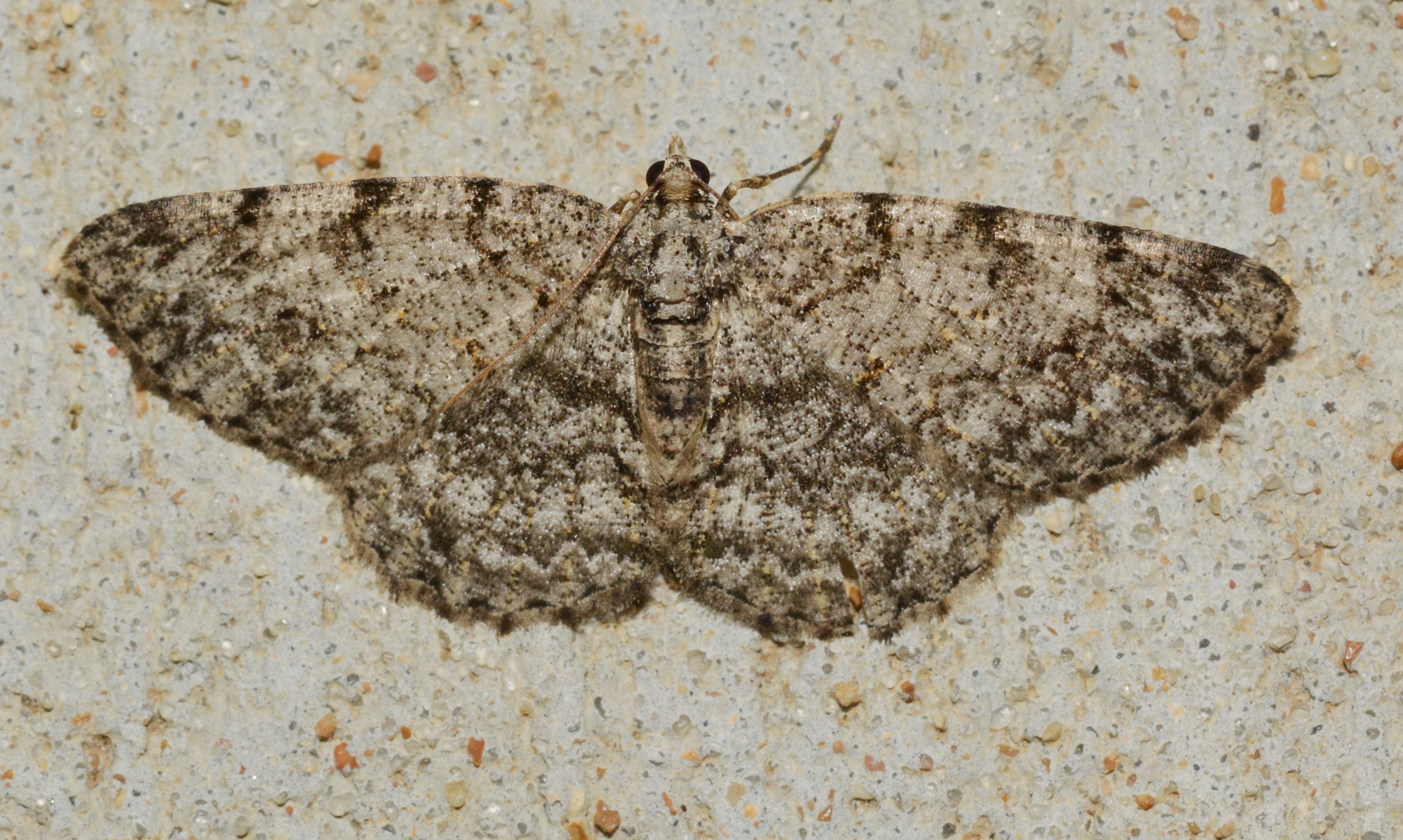

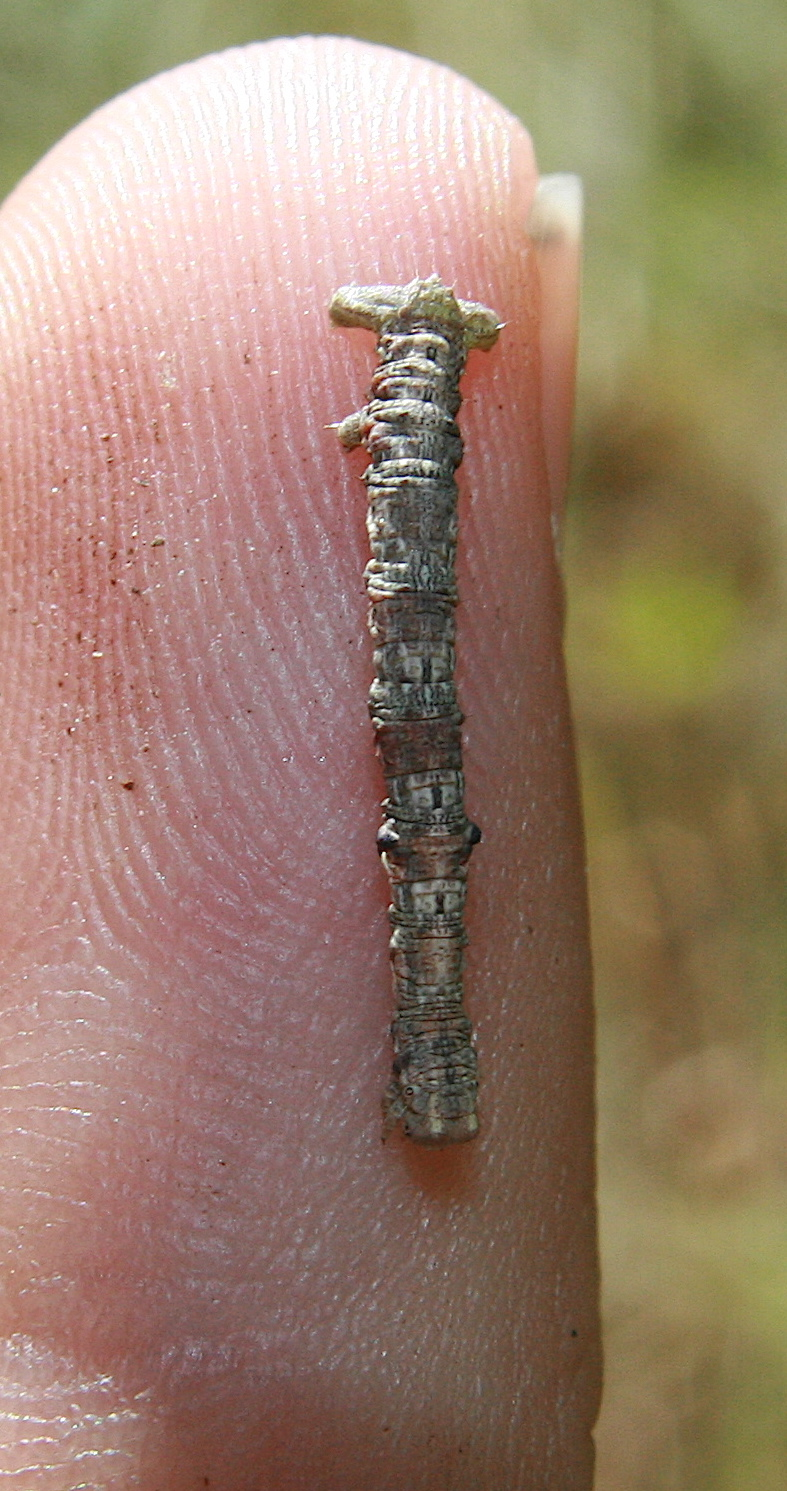
- Adult (top), larva (bottom)

Scientific classification
- Kingdom: Animalia
- Phylum: Arthropoda
- Clade: Pancrustacea
- Class: Insecta
- Order: Lepidoptera
- Family: Geometridae
- Genus: Protoboarmia
- Species: P. porcelaria

Binomial name
- Protoboarmia porcelaria (Guenée, 1857)

Synonyms
- Boarmia porcelaria Guenée, 1857; Boarmia filaria (Walker, 1860); Boarmia maestosa (Hulst, 1898)

= Protoboarmia porcelaria =

Porcelain gray

Species of moth

Protoboarmia porcelaria, the porcelain gray or dash-lined looper, is a moth in the Geometrid family found throughout North America, primarily in the east and northwest. The species was first described by Achille Guenée in 1857.

== Description ==
=== Adult ===
Adults have a wingspan of 27–30 mm. The wings are brown gray and have crossed brown/gray curved lines. At least one of these lines has a small tooth-like dentation along the length. There is a blotch of black at the postmedian start and a discal spot where the antemedian line crosses the costa. The hindwing discal mark is usually in the center.

=== Immature ===
Mature caterpillars are 25 mm in length and have a distinct Y-pattern on segments one through six. There is only one generation a year in the northern range while there are two in its southern range. The head is gray with a cream colored herringbone pattern on the lobes. The body is slim and is mottled gray and white with a white dorsum.

== Life cycle ==
=== Adult ===
The female lays around 150 eggs on the foliage of host plants in July. Adults are seen from May to September.

=== Immature ===
The larvae overwinter in their penultimate instar stage. The larvae awaken and begin feeding in early spring and pupate in June. Immature larvae are phyllophagous and mainly feed upon balsam fir, red spruce, tamarack, white spruce but are also seen on the following.

- Eastern red-cedar, Juniperus virginiana
- Eastern hemlock, Tsuga canadensis
- Eastern white pine, Pinus strobus
- Eastern white-cedar, Thuja occidentalis
- Ponderosa pine, Pinus ponderosa
- Colorado blue spruce, Picea pungens
- Subalpine fir, Abies lasiocarpa
- Western hemlock, Tsuga heterophylla
- Engelmann spruce, Picea engelmannii
- Pacific silver fir, Abies amabilis
- Douglas-fir, Pseudotsuga species
- Black spruce, Picea mariana
- Jack pine, Pinus banksiana
- Lodgepole pine, Pinus contorta
- Red pine, Pinus resinosa
- Scots pine, Pinus sylvestris
- Sugar maple, Acer saccharum
- Western red-cedar, Thuja plicata
- Sitka spruce, Picea sitchensis
