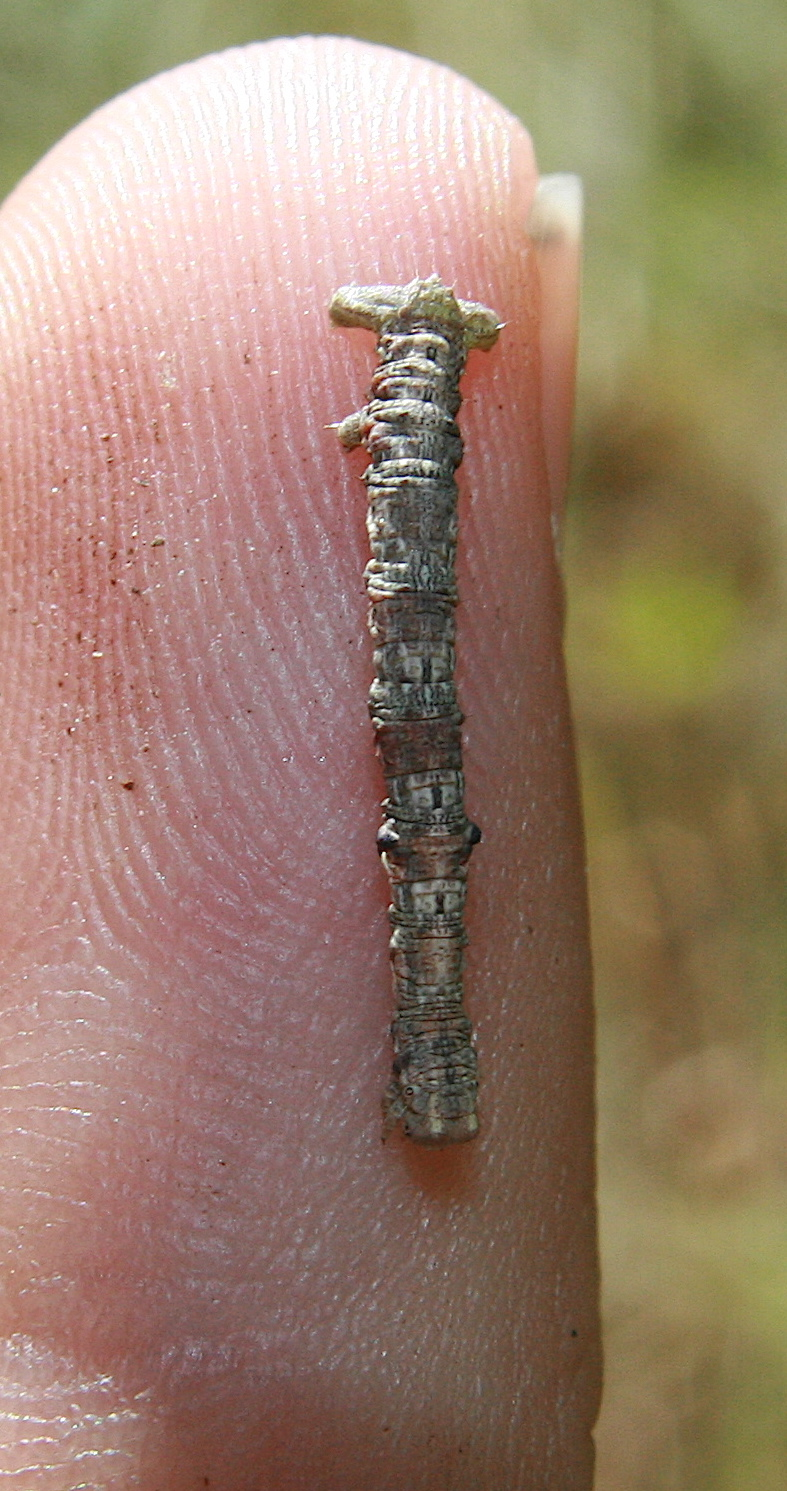
- Protoboarmia porcelaria

Scientific classification
- Kingdom: Animalia
- Phylum: Arthropoda
- Class: Insecta
- Order: Lepidoptera
- Family: Geometridae
- Tribe: Boarmiini
- Genus: Protoboarmia; McDunnough, 1920

= Protoboarmia =

Genus of moths

Protoboarmia is a genus of moths in the family Geometridae described by James Halliday McDunnough in 1820.

== Species ==
- Protoboarmia simpliciaria (Leech, 1897)
- Protoboarmia porcelaria (Guenée, 1857) – porcelain gray, dash-lined looper
