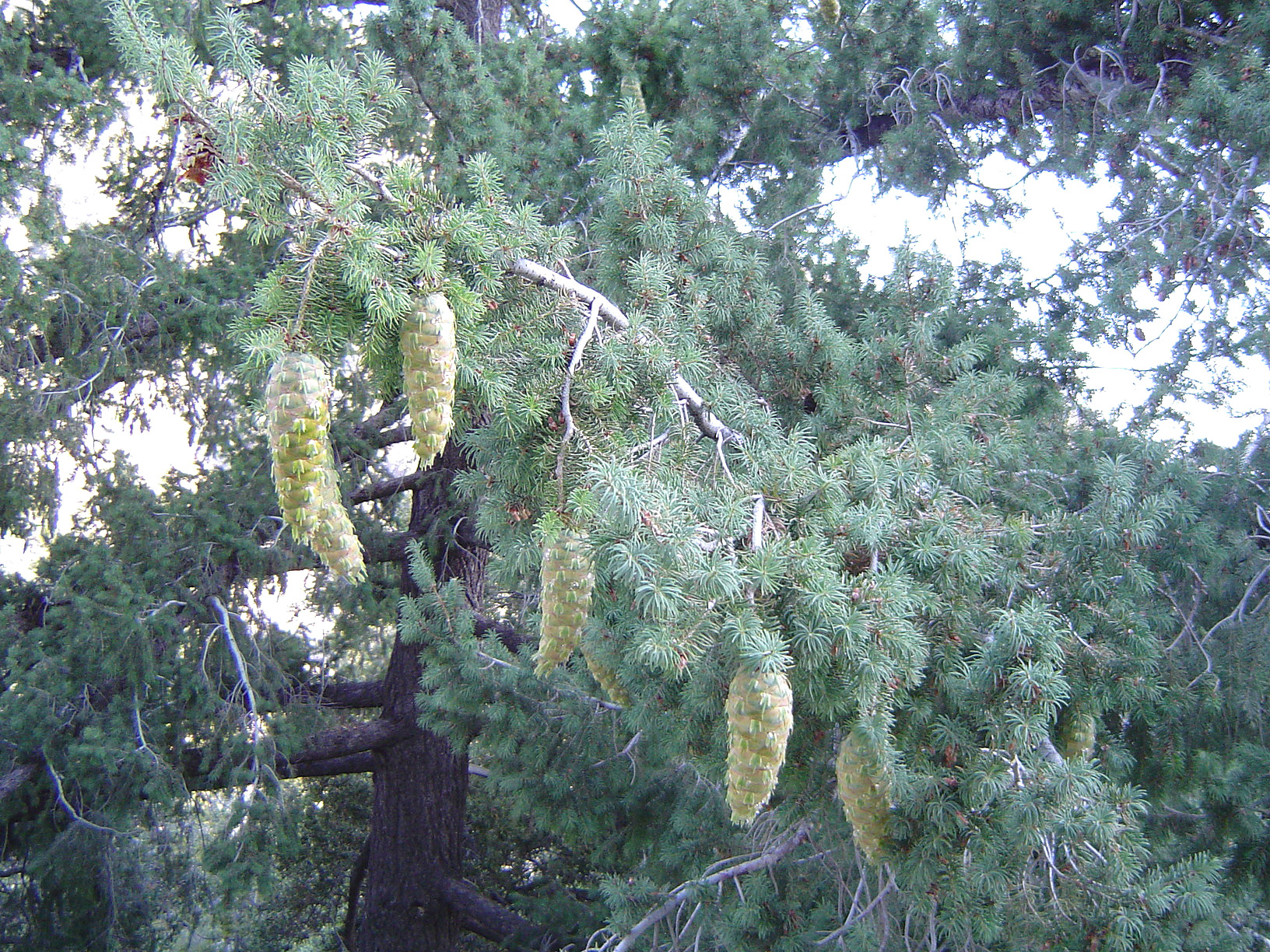
- Bigcone Douglas-fir at Mount San Antonio

Conservation status
- Near Threatened (IUCN 3.1)

Scientific classification
- Kingdom: Plantae
- Clade: Tracheophytes
- Clade: Gymnosperms
- Division: Pinophyta
- Class: Pinopsida
- Order: Pinales
- Family: Pinaceae
- Genus: Pseudotsuga
- Species: P. macrocarpa

Binomial name
- Pseudotsuga macrocarpa (Vasey) Mayr
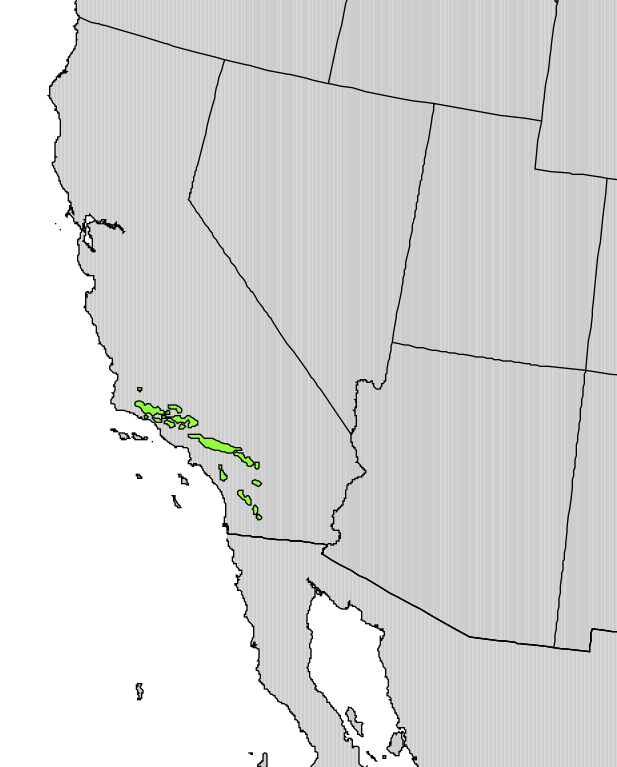
- Natural range

Synonyms
- Tsuga macrocarpa (Vasey) Lemmon; Pseudotsuga menziesii subsp. macrocarpa (Vasey) E. Murray; Pseudotsuga douglasii var. macrocarpa (Vasey) Engelm. Pseudotsuga californica Flous; Abies macrocarpa Vasey; Abies douglasii var. macrocarpa (Vasey) Vasey

= Pseudotsuga macrocarpa =

Species of conifer

Pseudotsuga macrocarpa, commonly called the bigcone spruce or bigcone Douglas-fir, is a conifer in the pine family, Pinaceae, native to the mountains of southern California. It is notable for having the largest (by far) cones in the genus Pseudotsuga, hence the name.

The tree occurs from the San Rafael Mountains in central Santa Barbara County and the Tehachapi Mountains of southwestern Kern County, south through the Transverse Ranges, to the Cuyamaca Mountains in San Diego County. The tree is shade-tolerant and prefers to grow on slopes.

== Name ==
Pseudotsuga macrocarpa is a Douglas-fir. The name "bigcone spruce", though confusing as it is not a spruce species, is often still used, and occurs in place names.

== Description ==
Pseudotsuga macrocarpa typically grows from 15–30 m (49–98 ft) in height and 56–155 cm (1 ft 10 in – 5 ft 1 in) in trunk diameter. The growth form is straight, with a conical crown from 12–30 m (39–98 ft) broad, and a strong and spreading root system. The bark is deeply ridged, composed of thin, woodlike plates separating heavy layers of cork; bark of trees over 1 m (3.3 ft) in diameter is from 15–20 cm (5.9–7.9 in) thick. The main branches are long and spreading with pendulous side shoots.

The leaves are needle-like, 2.5–4.5 cm (0.98–1.77 in) long, and are shed when about five years old. The female cones are from 11–17 cm (4.3–6.7 in) long, larger and with thicker scales than those of other douglas-firs, and with exserted tridentine bracts. The seeds are large and heavy, 10 mm long and 8 mm broad, with a short rounded wing 13 mm long; they may be bird or mammal dispersed as the wing is too small to be effective for wind dispersal. Trees start producing seeds at about 20 years of age.

The largest known individual of this species is 53 m (174 ft) tall, 231 cm (91 in) in diameter, and is estimated to be from 600 to 700 years of age.

== Distribution ==
Pseudotsuga macrocarpa is restricted to the California montane chaparral and woodlands and California coastal sage and chaparral ecoregions of California. It prefers a Mediterranean climate, characterized by hot dry summers and wet, mild winters. Annual rainfall during a 30-year period on a bigcone Douglas-fir site in the San Gabriel Mountains averaged 75 cm (30 in) and ranged from 25–125 cm (9.8–49.2 in).

Bigcone Douglas-fir occurs between 300–2,700 m (980–8,860 ft). At low elevation, it occurs near streams in moist, shaded canyons and draws where aspects are mostly north and east. At elevations from 1,350–1,700 m (4,430–5,580 ft), aspects include south- and east-facing slopes. At these elevations, it also grows on sloping hillsides, ridges, and benches. At higher elevations, it occurs on south and west aspects on all types of terrain. The average angle of slope on which it grows is 35 degrees, ranging from level to 90 degrees, although these extremes are uncommon.

Ranges the tree is found in, south to north, include:

- Peninsular Ranges
  - Cuyamaca Mountains
  - Palomar Mountains
  - Santa Ana Mountains
  - San Jacinto Mountains
- Transverse Ranges
  - San Bernardino Mountains
  - San Gabriel Mountains
  - Santa Susana Mountains
  - San Emigdio Mountains
  - Topatopa Mountains
  - Santa Ynez Mountains
  - San Rafael Mountains
  - Sierra Madre Mountains

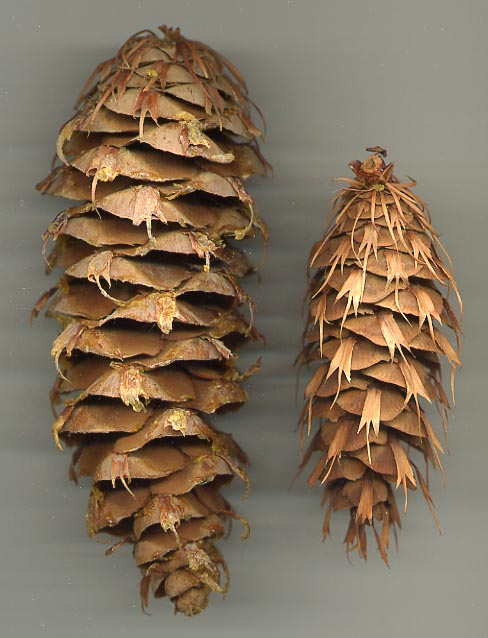
Bigcone Douglas-fir cone (left), with a coast Douglas-fir cone for comparison

== Ecology ==
Pseudotsuga macrocarpa, has several features to tolerate and survive wildfire, notably the very thick bark, and the presence of numerous adventitious buds on the upper side of the branches; this enables the trees to survive even crown fires which burn off all the branchlets, the apparently dead trees becoming green again the following spring. Wildfire frequencies in the chaparral habitats in which it often grows typically range from 15 to 50 year intervals. Bigcone Douglas-fir is closely associated with canyon live oak (Quercus chrysolepis) and often establishes itself in its shade; after about 50 years, it emerges above the oak canopy.

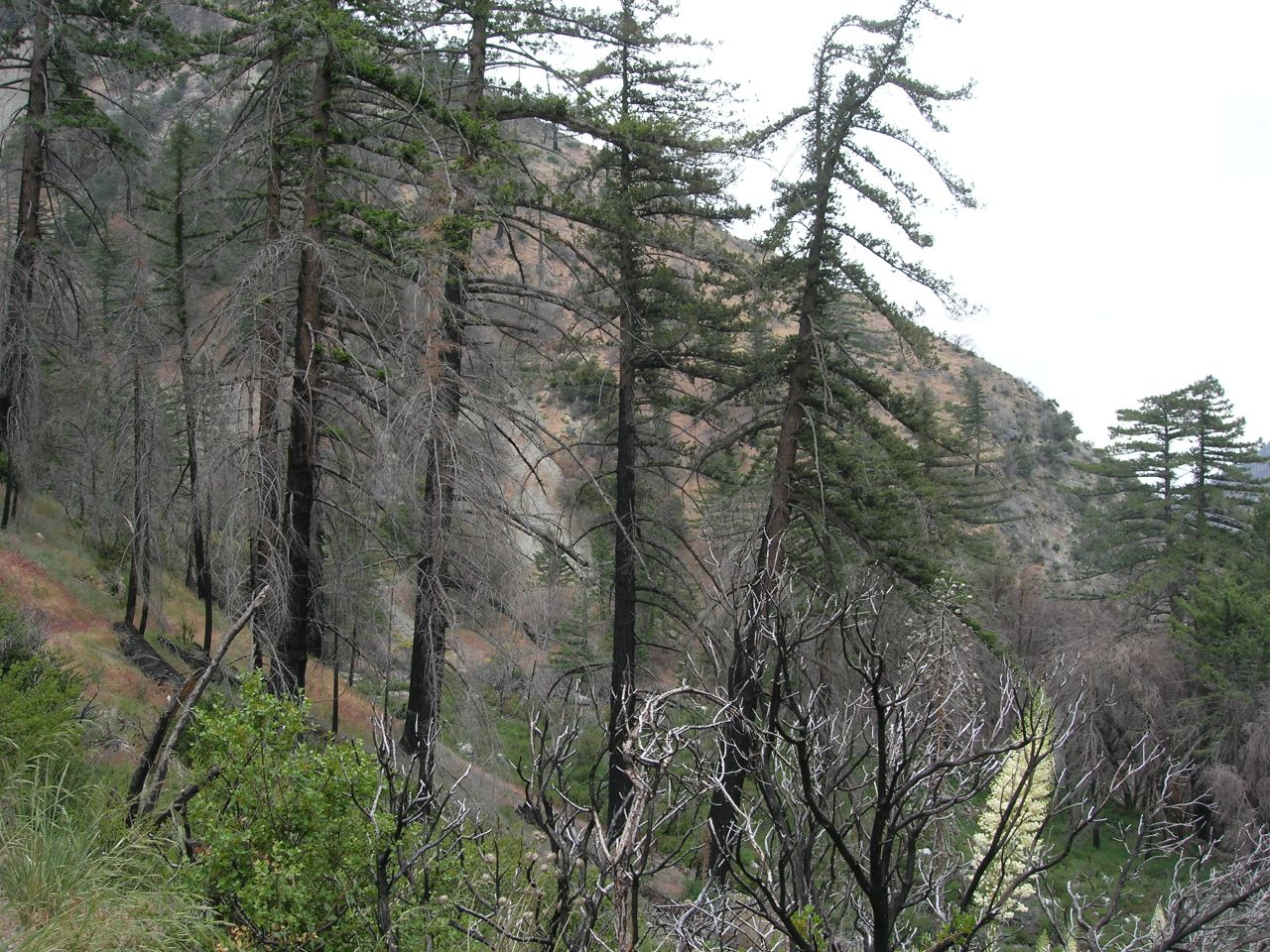
Pseudotsuga macrocarpa showing branch regeneration after a crown fire through epicormic shoots. Note the charred tree trunks.

The number of plant associates in bigcone Douglas-fir communities is usually small.

- Common overstory associates include: bigleaf maple (Acer macrophyllum), California bay laurel (Umbellularia californica), gray pine (Pinus sabiniana), and white alder (Alnus rhombifolia).
- Shrub associates include bigpod ceanothus (Ceanothus megacarpus), red shank (Adenostoma sparsifolium), eastwood manzanita (Arctostaphylos glandulosa), toyon (Heteromoles arbutifolia), several species of sage (Salvia), and coastal sage scrub oak (Quercus dumosa).
- Ground cover associates are usually sparse, and may include California buckwheat (Eriogonum fasciculatum), wild onion (Allium spp.), scarlet keckiella (Keckiella ternata), giant chain fern (Woodwardia fimbriata), and western bracken (Pteridium aquilinum var. pubescens).

=== Fire ecology ===
Pseudotsuga macrocarpa populations are suspected to be declining due to possibly larger and more extreme wildland fires with greater frequencies. Major wildfires within its range, since 2003, have clearly proven a reduced extent when compared to early 1930s extents derived from historical aerial photos. Although historical information has provided the opportunity to detect stand level patch changes, post-fire resprouting of older more mature trees and natural regeneration and recruitment of the species into higher canopy has yet to be adequately quantified.

One tree species in direct competition with bigcone is Calocedrus decurrens, with preliminary post-fire regeneration of this species exponentially greater than bigcone. One or two years after the Station fire in 2009 on the Angeles National Forest, there was an estimated 20:1 cedar:bigcone seedling density in fixed radius plots on Mount Wilson. It may be more appropriate to perform population stability estimates up to five years or much later (i.e. 20 yrs) after a large conflagration due to the potential for immediate and delayed post-fire sprouting and regeneration and interplant competition, as well as the well-noted strategy of seed germination in shrub understories, which is likely to escape detection by surveyors until much later in its life.

Research related to the role of mycorrhizae and its relationship to seed establishment needs evaluated in these vegetation communities due to the suspected role it has with the relationship with water, especially in water-limited systems such as those in the wildlands of southern California. In addition, an aggressive seed cone collection strategy should be drafted for this species which includes extensive collection during large cone production years such as 2013, and should include a tracking system to determine correlations to climatic conditions in order to develop a foundation from which to perform species viability assessments w/ varying future climate scenarios.

This tree is being considered for more extensive plantings in semiarid locales. Its favorable qualities include resistance to drought, fire, insects, decay, and damage from ozone, and its aggressive rooting system and tolerance to variable growing medium. The needles of older trees sometimes fade to yellow, drop, and trees appear dead only to sprout with renewed vigor within two years. The reason is unknown, although drought or insects may be possible causes.

== Uses ==
=== Wildlife ===
Bigcone Douglas-fir stands provide habitat for black-tailed deer, black bear, and various small animals. These trees provide preferred spring habitat for black bear in the San Bernardino Mountains.

The seeds are eaten by various rodents and birds.

=== Restoration species ===
Bigcone Douglas-fir is used for watershed and habitat restoration. The Los Angeles County Department of Forestry has extensively planted the tree over a 50-year period for that purpose.

Some hybrids of Pseudotsuga macrocarpa (Bigcone Douglas-fir) × Pseudotsuga menziesii (Coast Douglas-fir) show promise for planting on drier restoration sites within the P. menziesii−Douglas-fir natural range. These hybrids produce wood of comparable quality to that of Douglas-fir and have the drought tolerance of bigcone Douglas-fir.

=== Timber ===
There is no current commercial market for bigcone Douglas-fir wood due to limited distribution and access. It is heavy, hard, and fine grained but not durable. There is less sapwood than heartwood, and the latter contains pockets of resin.

In the past, the wood was used locally for fuel and lumber.

== See also ==
- California mixed evergreen forest — ecoregion.
- California chaparral and woodlands — ecoregion.
  - California montane chaparral and woodlands — subecoregion.
