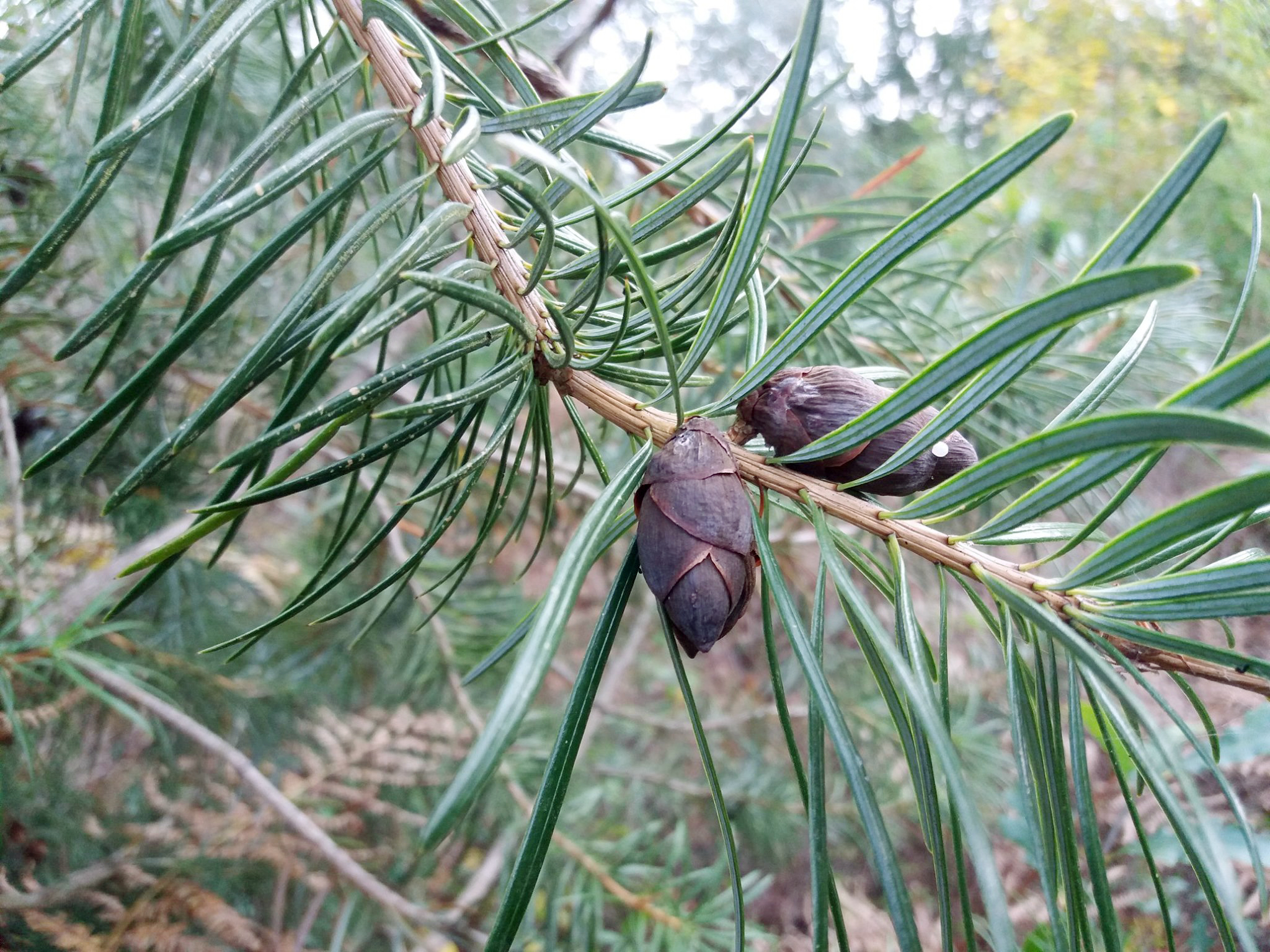

Conservation status
- Vulnerable (IUCN 3.1)

Scientific classification
- Kingdom: Plantae
- Clade: Tracheophytes
- Clade: Gymnosperms
- Division: Pinophyta
- Class: Pinopsida
- Order: Pinales
- Family: Pinaceae
- Subfamily: Laricoideae
- Genus: Cathaya; Chun & Kuang
- Species: C. argyrophylla

Binomial name
- Cathaya argyrophylla Chun & Kuang

Species
- Cathaya argyrophylla Chun & Kuang; †Cathaya loehri (Engelhardt & Kinkelin) Chun & Kuang

Synonyms
- Pseudotsuga argyrophylla (Chun & Kuang) Greguss; Tsuga argyrophylla (Chun & Kuang) de Laub. & Silba; Cathaya argyrophylla subsp. nanchuanensis (Chun & Kuang) Silba; Cathaya argyrophylla subsp. sutchuenensis Silba; Cathaya nanchuanensis Chun & Kuang

= Cathaya =

Cathaya Temporal range: 30.0–0 Ma

Genus of conifers

Cathaya is a genus in the pine family, Pinaceae, with one known living species, Cathaya argyrophylla. In foliage and cone morphology, Cathaya has been considered a member of the subfamily Laricoideae, closely related to Pseudotsuga and Larix, but more recent genetic studies have suggested a closer relationship to Pinus and Picea in the subfamily Pinoideae. A second species, C. nanchuanensis, is now treated as a synonym, as it does not differ from C. argyrophylla in any characteristics.

== Description ==
Cathaya is confined to a limited area in southern China, in the provinces of Guangxi, Guizhou, Hunan and southeast Sichuan. It is a medium-sized tree growing to 20 m (66 ft) tall and a trunk up to 60 cm (24 in) diameter, found on steep, narrow mountain slopes at 950–1,800 m (3,100–5,900 ft) altitude on limestone soils. A larger population has been reduced by over-cutting before its scientific discovery and protection in 1950.

The leaves are needle-like, 2.5–5.5 cm (1.0–2.2 in) long, have ciliate (hairy) margins when young, and grow around the stems in a spiral pattern. The cones are 3–5 cm (1.2–2.0 in) long, with about 15–20 scales, each scale bearing two winged seeds.

One or two botanists, unhappy with the idea of a new genus in such a familiar family, tried to shoehorn it into other existing genera, as Pseudotsuga argyrophylla and Tsuga argyrophylla. It is however very distinct from both of these genera, and these combinations are not now used.

The species was introduced into Europe and North America in the 1990s.

== Fossil record ==
The extinct fossil species Cathaya loehri (Engelhardt & Kinkelin) Chun & Kuang is described from the Miocene and Pliocene of Germany and France; other Cathaya fossils are known from the Miocene and Pliocene of eastern Siberia, and from the early Pleistocene of southern Portugal. They are abundant in European brown coal deposits dating from between 10 and 30 million years ago.
