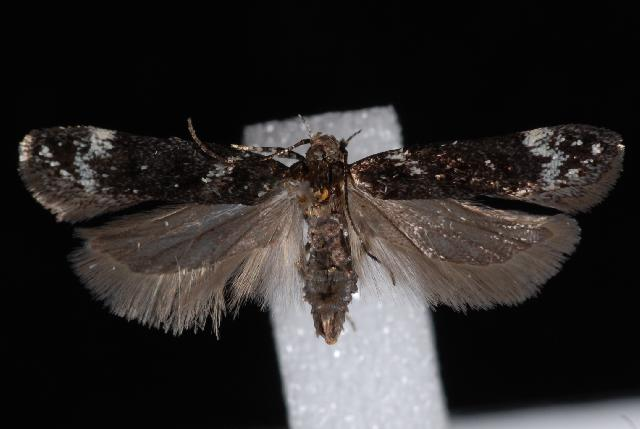

Scientific classification
- Kingdom: Animalia
- Phylum: Arthropoda
- Clade: Pancrustacea
- Class: Insecta
- Order: Lepidoptera
- Family: Gelechiidae
- Genus: Chionodes
- Species: C. abella

Binomial name
- Chionodes abella (Busck, 1903)

Synonyms
- Gelechia abella Busck, 1903

= Chionodes abella =

Species of moth

Chionodes abella is a moth in the family Gelechiidae. It is found in North America, where it has been recorded from Idaho and south-western British Columbia to Colorado, Texas and California.

The wingspan is about 15 mm. The forewings are white, thickly suffused with fuscous, obliterating the white ground-color except on the apical third of the wing, which is pure white. Near base is an ill-defined oblique costal streak with only a few dark scales therefore appearing whitish against the darker surrounding parts. The hindwings are light fuscous.

The larvae feed on Pseudotsuga menziesii, Abies concolor, Abies grandis, Abies lasiocarpa, Pinus contorta and Pinus radiata.
