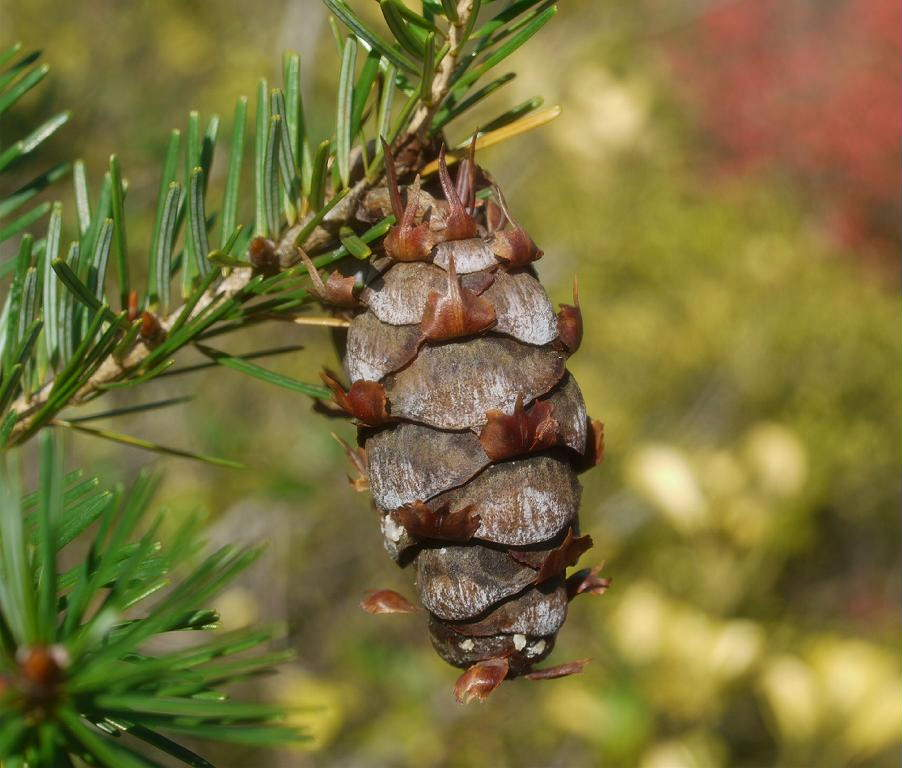

Conservation status
- Endangered (IUCN 3.1)

Scientific classification
- Kingdom: Plantae
- Clade: Tracheophytes
- Clade: Gymnosperms
- Division: Pinophyta
- Class: Pinopsida
- Order: Pinales
- Family: Pinaceae
- Genus: Pseudotsuga
- Species: P. japonica

Binomial name
- Pseudotsuga japonica (Shiras.) Beissn.

Synonyms
- Tsuga japonica Shiras.

= Pseudotsuga japonica =

Species of conifer

Pseudotsuga japonica, the Japanese Douglas-fir, is a species of conifer in the pine family, Pinaceae, that is endemic to Japan. It is a medium-sized tree growing to 25 m (82 ft) tall. In Japan, the tree is called togasawara (Japanese: トガサワラ).
