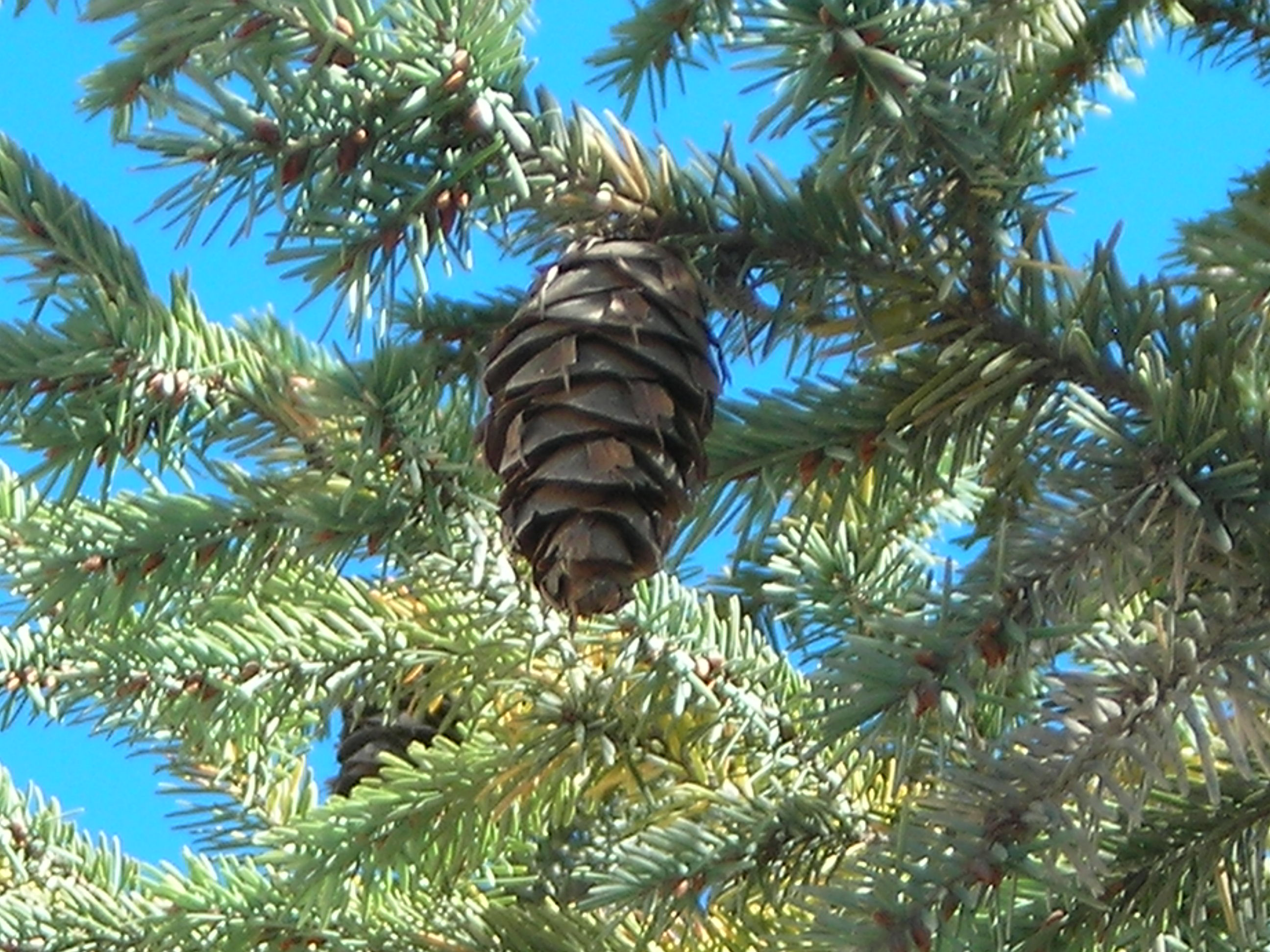
- Mexican Douglas-fir branch with cones

Scientific classification
- Kingdom: Plantae
- Clade: Tracheophytes
- Clade: Gymnospermae
- Division: Pinophyta
- Class: Pinopsida
- Order: Pinales
- Family: Pinaceae
- Genus: Pseudotsuga
- Species: D. fir
- Variety: P. m. var. lindleyana

Trinomial name
- Pseudotsuga menziesii var. lindleyana (Roezl) Carrière

Synonyms
- P. lindleyana; P. flahaultii; P. guinieri; P. macrolepis; P. menziesii var. oaxacana; P. rehderi; Tsuga lindleyana

= Pseudotsuga menziesii var. lindleyana =

Mexican Douglas-fir

Variety of conifer

Pseudotsuga menziesii var. lindleyana, commonly known as the Mexican Douglas-fir, is a conifer in the genus Pseudotsuga that is endemic to Mexico. DNA sequence and morphological evidence suggests it is most closely related to Rocky Mountain Douglas-fir (P. menziesii var. glauca) and might best be treated as an additional variety within P. menziesii.

== Distribution ==
Pseudotsuga menziesii var. lindleyana is native to the Sierra Madre Occidental, Sierra Madre Oriental, and scattered mountains as far south as Oaxaca. The Mexican Government lists Mexican Douglas-fir as "subject to special protection" because its populations are small, isolated and show signs of low fertility and recruitment due to inbreeding depression.
