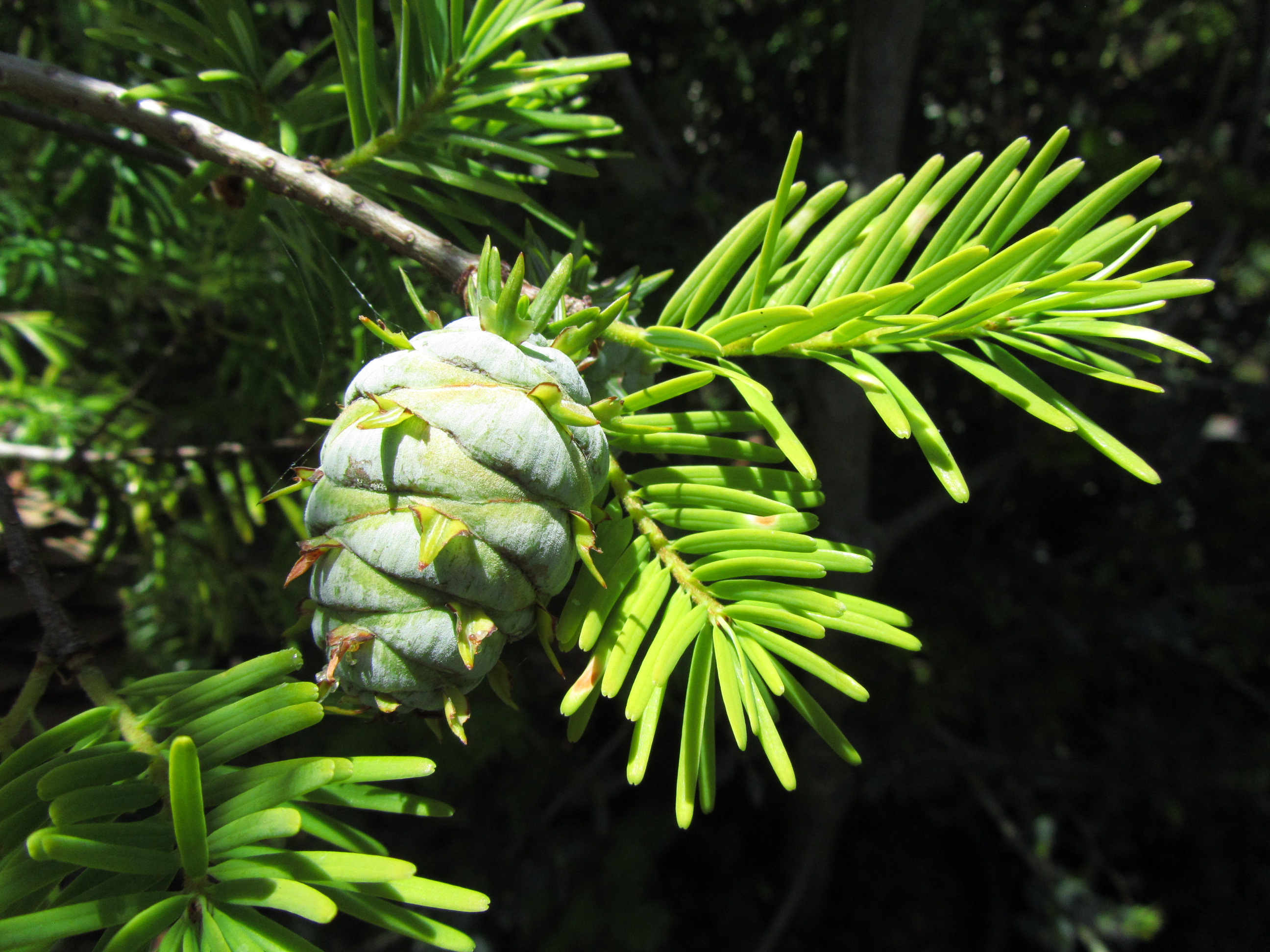

Conservation status
- Vulnerable (IUCN 3.1)

Scientific classification
- Kingdom: Plantae
- Clade: Tracheophytes
- Clade: Gymnosperms
- Division: Pinophyta
- Class: Pinopsida
- Order: Pinales
- Family: Pinaceae
- Genus: Pseudotsuga
- Species: P. sinensis

Binomial name
- Pseudotsuga sinensis Dode

= Pseudotsuga sinensis =

Species of conifer

Pseudotsuga sinensis (Chinese Douglas-fir; in Chinese 黃杉, pinyin romanization: huáng shān) is a large species of conifer in the pine family, Pinaceae. It is a tree that grows up to 50 metres (160 ft) tall. It is found in south China (in Anhui, Fujian, Guangxi, Guizhou, Hubei, Hunan, Jiangxi, Shaanxi, Sichuan, Yunnan, and Zhejiang provinces) and Taiwan, as well as in northernmost parts of Vietnam.

The timber is used for construction, bridge building, furniture, and wood fiber.

Pseudotsuga sinensis var. wilsoniana, Taiwan Douglas-fir, is sometimes treated as its own species, Pseudotsuga wilsoniana. This variety is geographically isolated (being restricted to Taiwan) but is not markedly distinct morphologically from var. sinensis of China.
