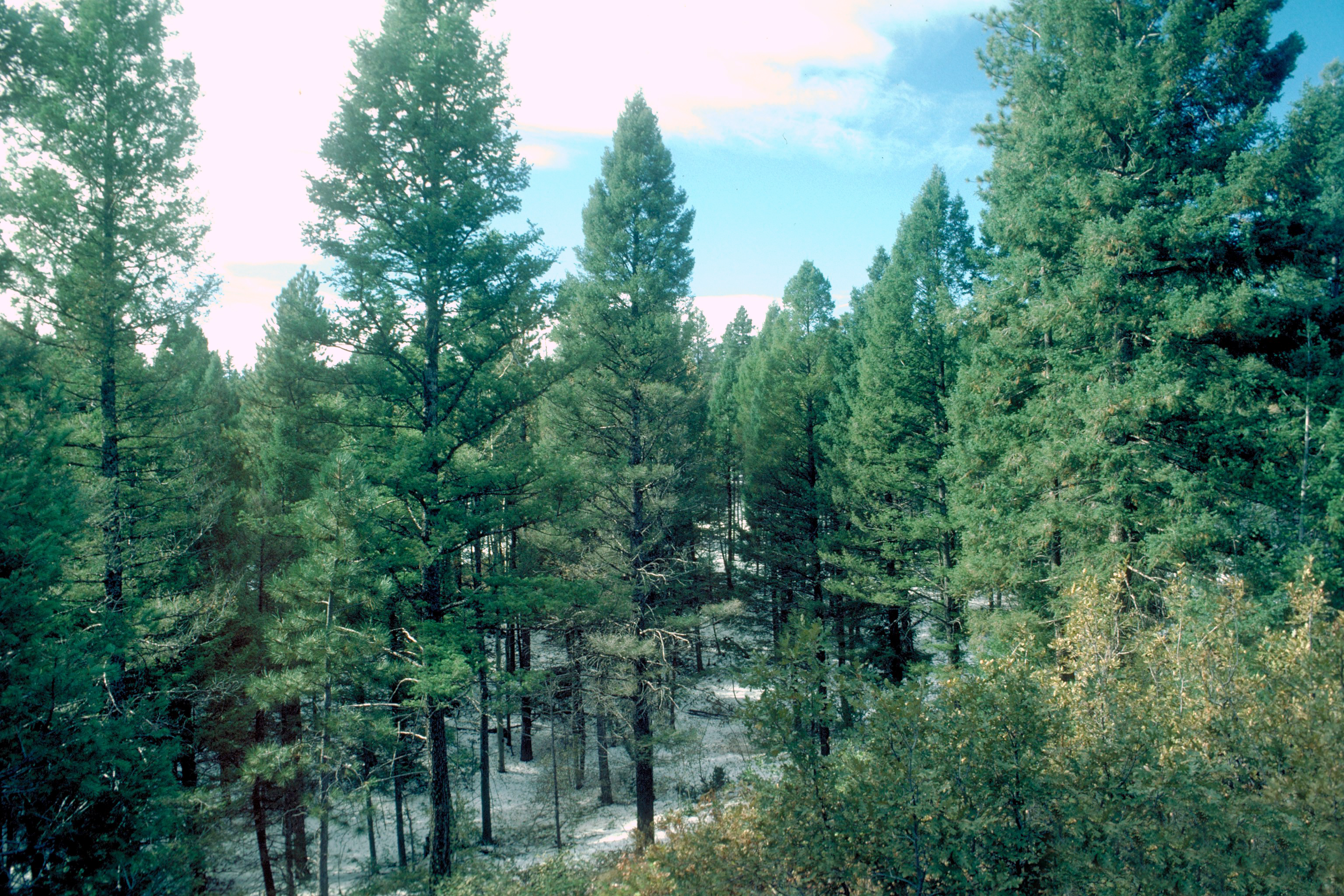
- Rocky Mountain Douglas-fir forest in Pike National Forest, Colorado (United States)

Scientific classification
- Kingdom: Plantae
- Clade: Tracheophytes
- Clade: Gymnospermae
- Division: Pinophyta
- Class: Pinopsida
- Order: Pinales
- Family: Pinaceae
- Genus: Pseudotsuga
- Species: D. fir
- Variety: P. m. var. glauca

Trinomial name
- Pseudotsuga menziesii var. glauca (Mayr) Franco

Synonyms
- Pseudotsuga menziesii var. caesia (Schwer.) Franco; Pseudotsuga taxifolia var. caesia (Schwer.) Asch. & Graebn.; Pseudotsuga taxifolia var. glauca (Beissn.) Sudw.

= Pseudotsuga menziesii var. glauca =

Rocky Mountain Douglas-fir

Variety of plants

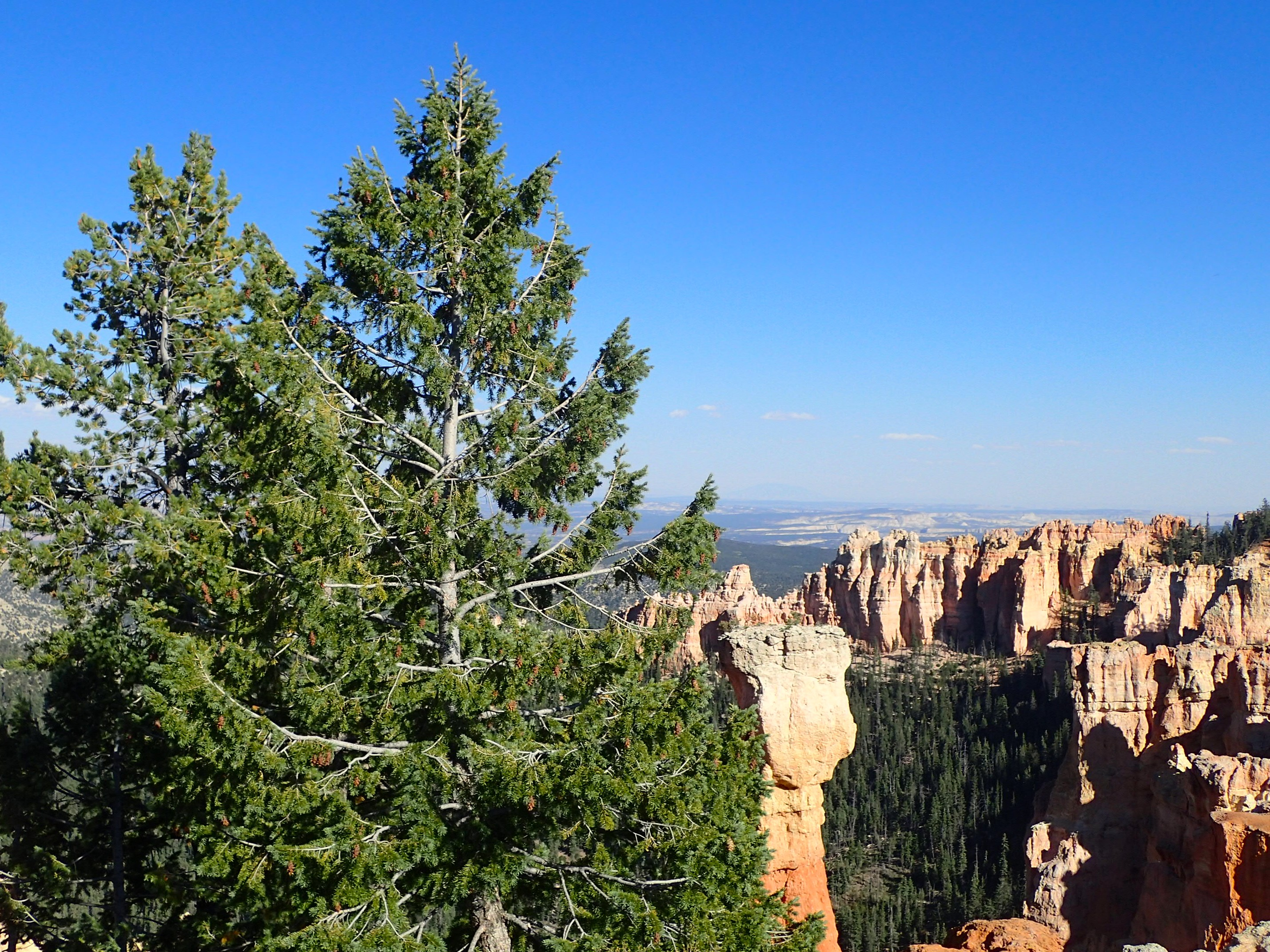
Pseudotsuga menziesii subsp. glauca

Pseudotsuga menziesii var. glauca, or Rocky Mountain Douglas-fir, is an evergreen conifer native to the interior mountainous regions of western North America, from central British Columbia and southwest Alberta in Canada southward through the United States to the far north of Mexico. The range is continuous in the northern Rocky Mountains south to eastern Washington, eastern Oregon, Idaho, western and south-central Montana and western Wyoming, but becomes discontinuous further south, confined to "sky islands" on the higher mountains in Utah, Colorado, Arizona and New Mexico, with only very isolated small populations in eastern Nevada, westernmost Texas, and northern Mexico. It occurs from 600 m altitude in the north of the range, up to 3,000 m, rarely 3,200 m, in the south. Further west towards the Pacific coast, it is replaced by the related coast Douglas-fir (Pseudotsuga menziesii var. menziesii), and to the south, it is replaced by Mexican Douglas-fir in high mountains as far south as Oaxaca. Some botanists have grouped Mexican Douglas-fir with P. menziesii var. glauca, but genetic and morphological evidence suggest that Mexican populations should be considered a different variety (Pseudotsuga menziesii var. lindleyana).

Rocky Mountain Douglas-fir is most commonly treated as a variety (Pseudotsuga menziesii var. glauca), but has also been called a subspecies (Pseudotsuga menziesii subsp. glauca) or more rarely (mainly in the past) a distinct species (Pseudotsuga glauca). The strong ecological and genetic differentiation with intergradation limited primarily to postglacial contact zones in British Columbia supports infraspecific groupings. Some botanists have further split Rocky Mountain Douglas-fir into two varieties, but these are not widely acknowledged and have only limited support from genetic testing.

== Characteristics ==
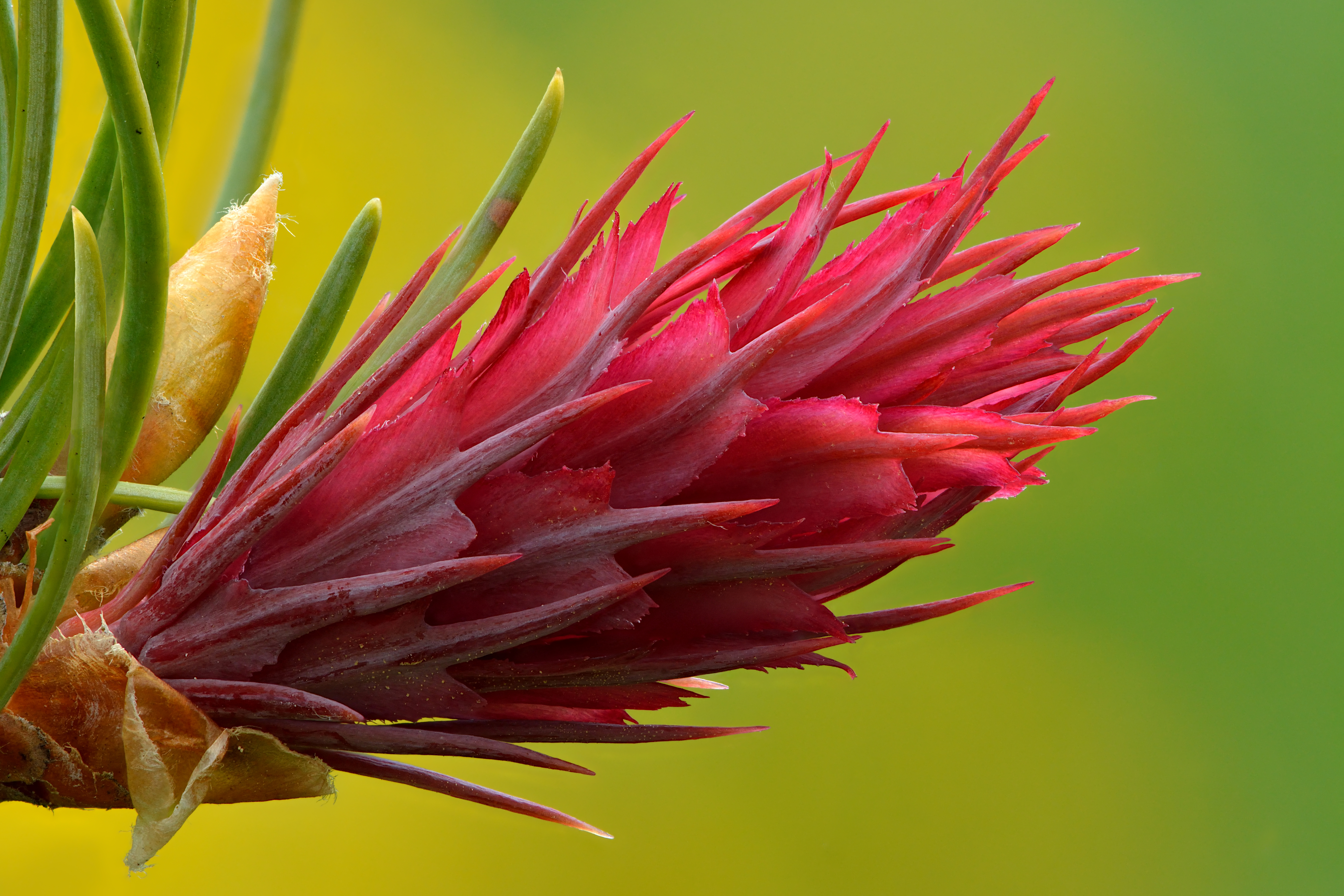
Young seed cone

Rocky Mountain Douglas-fir is a large tree, typically reaching 35–45 m (115–148 ft) in height and 1 m (3 ft 3 in) in diameter, with exceptional specimens known to 67 m (220 ft) tall, and 2 m (6 ft 7 in) in diameter. It commonly lives more than 500 years and occasionally more than 1,200 years. The bark on young trees is thin, smooth, gray, and covered with resin blisters. On mature trees, it is moderately thick (3–6 cm, 1 1/4–2 1/4 in), furrowed and corky though much less so than coast Douglas-fir.

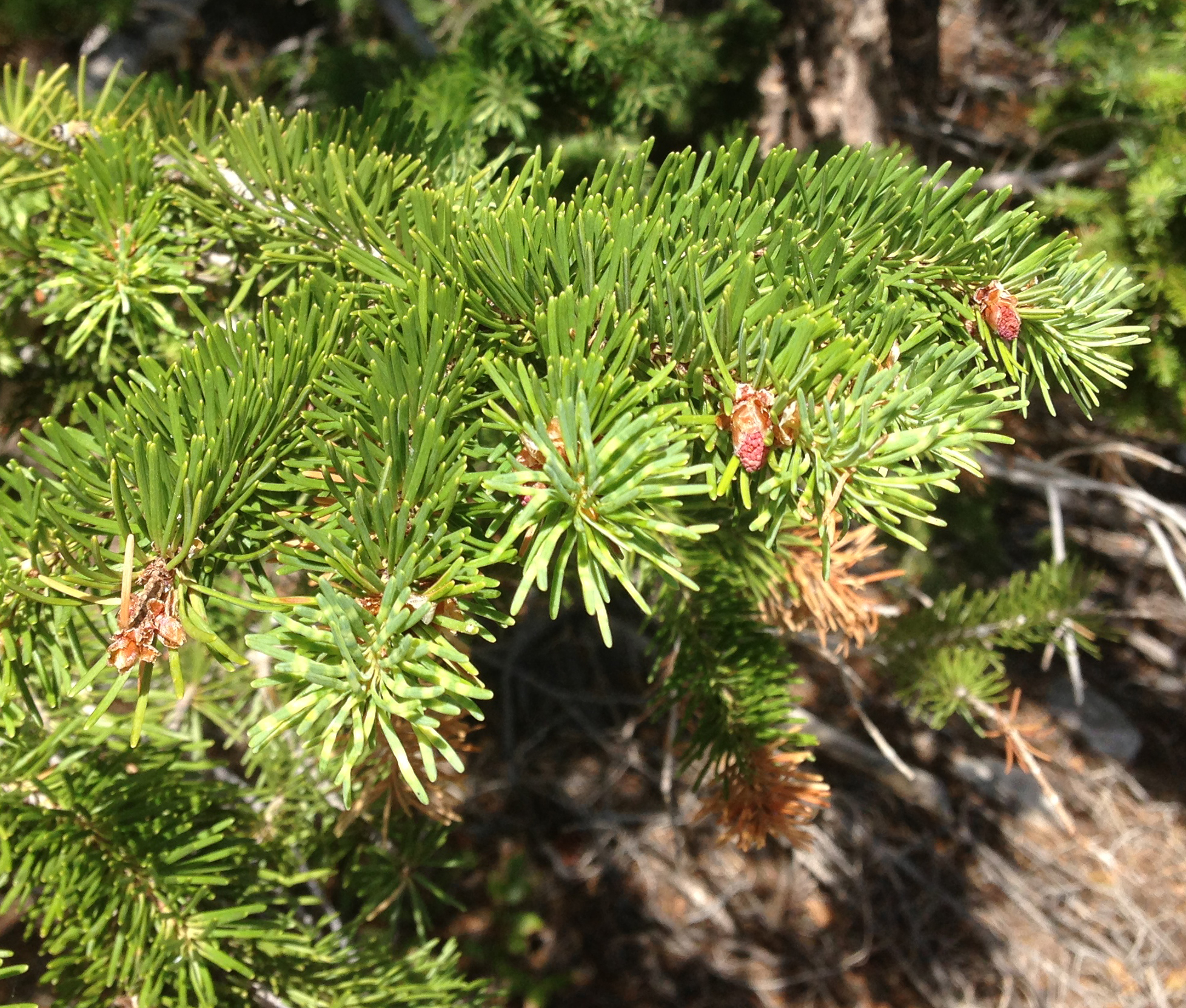
Foliage

The shoots are brown to gray-brown, smooth, though not as smooth as fir shoots, and finely pubescent with scattered short hairs. The buds are a distinctive narrow conic shape, 3–6 mm (1/8–1/4 in) long, with red-brown bud scales. The leaves are spirally arranged but slightly twisted at the base to be upswept above the shoot, needle-like, 2–3 cm (3/4–1 1/4 in) long, gray-green to blue-green above with a single broad stomatal patch, and with two whitish stomatal bands below.

The male (pollen) cones are 2–3 cm (3/4–1 1/4 in) long, and are typically restricted to, or more abundant on, lower branches. Pollen cones develop over 1 year and wind-dispersed pollen is released for several weeks in the spring.

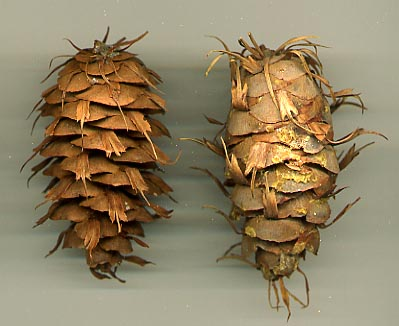
Rocky Mountain Douglas-fir cones Left: Shuswap Lake, British Columbia, Canada Right: Chiricahua Mountains, Arizona, U.S.

The mature female seed cones are pendent, 4–7 cm (1 1/2–2 3/4 in) long, 2 cm (3/4 in) broad when closed, opening to 3–4 cm (1 1/4–1 1/2 in) broad. They are produced in spring, purple (sometimes green) at first, maturing orange-brown in the autumn 5–7 months later. The seeds are 5–6 mm (3/16–1/4 in) long and 3–4 mm (1/8–3/16 in) broad, with a 12–15 mm (1/2–9/16 in) wing. Both coast Douglas-fir and Rocky Mountain Douglas-fir produce abundant crops of seed approximately every 2–11 years. Seed is produced annually except for about 1 year in any 4-to-5-year period.

== Growth ==
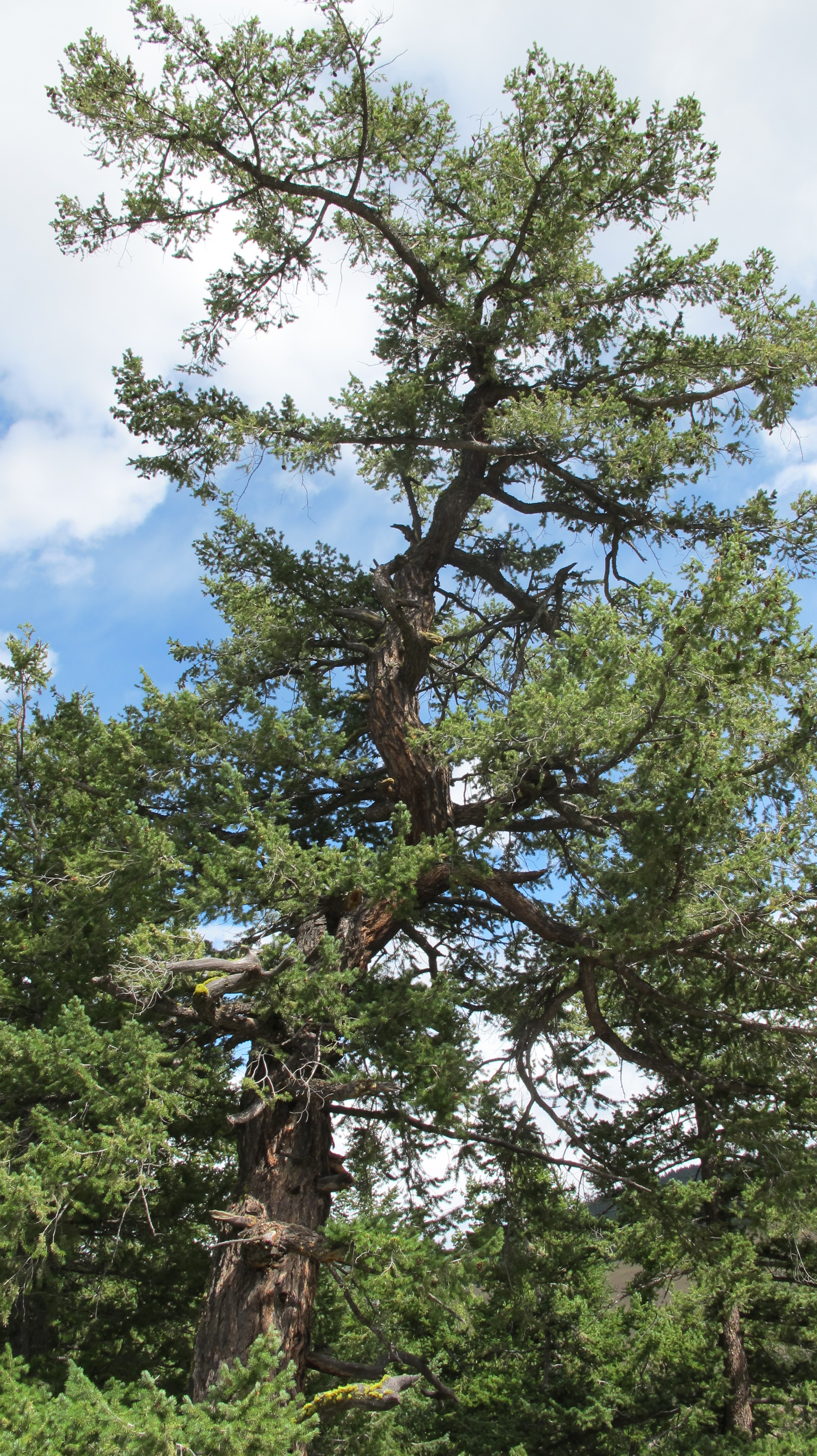
Douglas-fir, British Columbia

Rocky Mountain Douglas-fir grows more slowly than coast Douglas-fir and is also much more cold tolerant. Tolerance of different environmental conditions varies among populations of Rocky Mountain Douglas-fir, especially among populations from the northern and southern Rockies. However, even nearby populations can differ in cold hardiness.

Root morphology is variable, but when unimpeded, a taproot forms within several years. "Platelike" root morphologies occur where growth is impeded. The most prominent lateral roots begin in the 1st or 2nd year of growth. Most roots in surface soil are "long ropelike laterals of secondary and tertiary origin". Fine-root production is episodic in response to changing environmental conditions; the average lifespan of fine roots is usually between several days and several weeks.

Rocky Mountain Douglas-fir reaches reproductive maturity at 12–15 years. It has winged seeds that are dispersed primarily by wind and gravity. In western Montana clearcuts, seeds were dispersed up to 250 m (820 ft) uphill from their source, but seedfall between 180–250 m (590–820 ft) was only 7% of that found in uncut stands. Other studies determined that seedfall in clearcuts beyond 80 m (260 ft) from seed trees was about 3% of seedfall in uncut stands where seed trees are close together. Well-stocked stands have resulted from seedfall from sources 1–2 km (0.62–1.24 mi) distant, but most Douglas-fir seeds fall within 100 m (330 ft) of their source. Small amounts of seed are dispersed by mice, chipmunks, and squirrels. Rocky Mountain Douglas-fir seeds are disseminated about twice as far as seeds of ponderosa pine.

== Longevity ==
The oldest accurately-dated Rocky Mountain Douglas-fir, 1275 years old, is in New Mexico. This longevity is apparently uncommon; growing on a relatively barren lava field has protected it from fire, animals, and humans. Growth typically slows dramatically between 90 and 140 years of age.

In the dry-belt forests of central British Columbia, ages can exceed 500 years on sites normal for the region. The oldest accurately-dated growth ring available for the region is 1475; dates in the 1500s and 1600s are more common for remnant patches that have escaped logging, fire, and other disturbances.

== Pathology ==
It is affected by the diseases Phaeolus schweinitzii, Armillaria, Phellinus weirii, Fomes annosus, dwarf mistletoe, Dasyscypha canker and Rhabdocline needle cast.

== Insects ==
It attracts the Douglas fir beetle, western budworm and tussock moth.

== Ecology ==
Rocky Mountain Douglas-fir grows on a variety of sites across its wide geographic range. It grows at lower elevations adjacent to and within bunchgrass communities and is also found in upper-elevation subalpine forests. It tends to be most abundant in low- and middle-elevation forests, where it grows over a wide range of aspects, slopes, landforms, and soils.

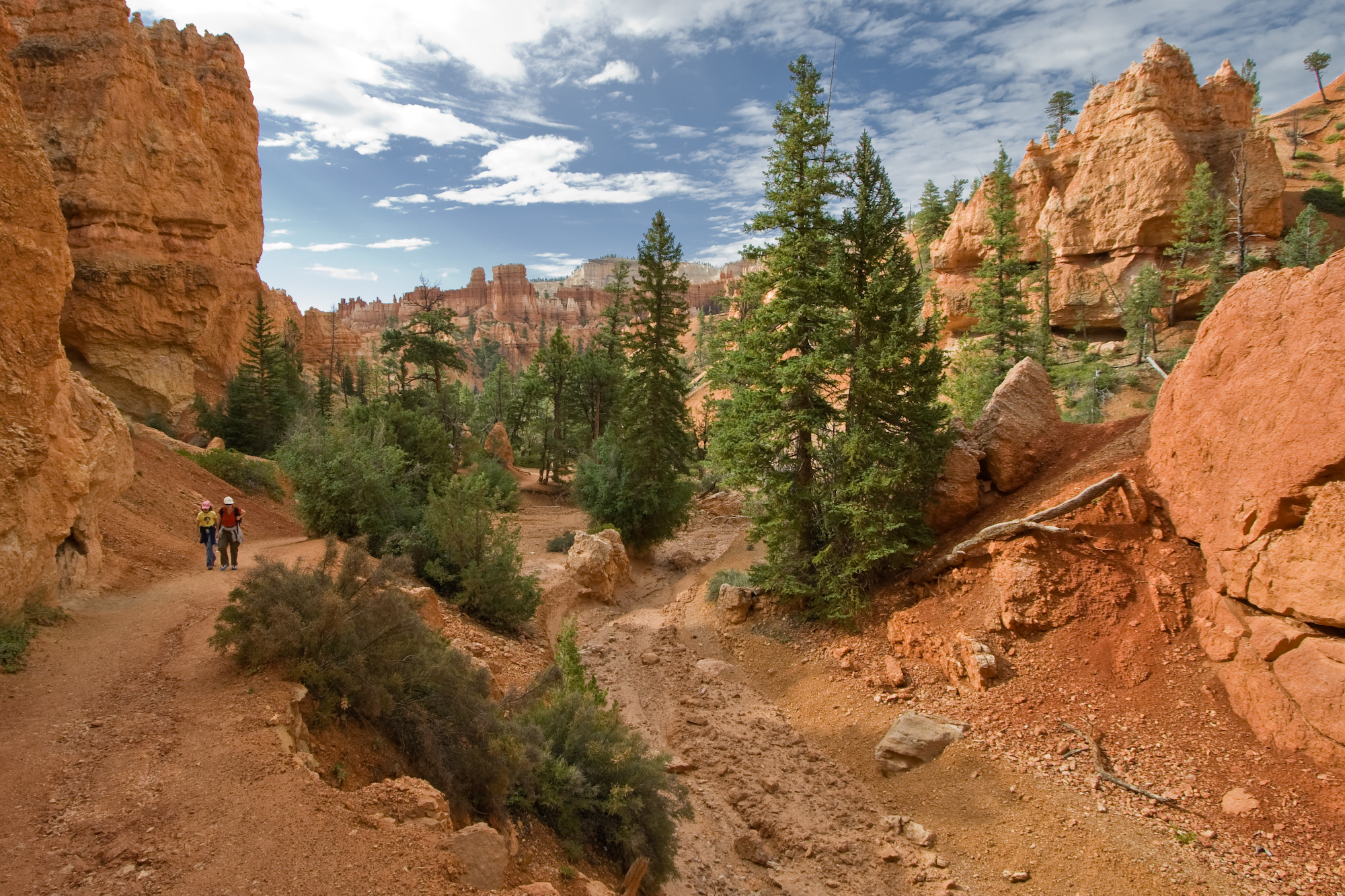
Rocky Mountain Douglas-fir and ponderosa pine, Bryce Canyon National Park, Utah

In spring and winter (in British Columbia, Idaho, and Montana) elk browse on south- and southwest-facing Rocky Mountain Douglas-fir and ponderosa pine stands, particularly when shrubs and/or grasses are productive. In summer, elk generally are found at higher elevations (outside the Rocky Mountain Douglas-fir and Pacific ponderosa pine zones). During fall, elk use stands of Rocky Mountain lodgepole pine, subalpine fir, western larch, or grand fir with high canopy cover.

In parts of Yellowstone National Park, elk browsing is so intensive that young Rocky Mountain Douglas-fir are stunted at 1–1.5 m (3.3–4.9 ft) in height, with live branches trailing very close to the ground, and branches on the upper two thirds of the tree dead. Low-elevation and south-facing open-structure Rocky Mountain Douglas-fir types are often important winter range for white-tailed deer and mule deer. Moose winter in low-elevation Rocky Mountain Douglas-fir types in areas where willow thickets, the preferred winter habitat, are lacking; in such areas Rocky Mountain Douglas-fir is an important moose food.

Chipmunks, mice, voles, and shrews eat large quantities of conifer seeds from the forest floor, and clipped cones are a staple and major part of storage of red squirrels. These animals store a large amount of Rocky Mountain Douglas-fir cones or seeds. American marten commonly den in hollow logs.

Numerous species of songbirds extract seeds from Douglas-fir cones or forage for seeds on the ground. The most common are the Clark's nutcracker, black-capped chickadee, mountain chickadee, boreal chickadee, red-breasted nuthatch, pygmy nuthatch, red crossbill, white-winged crossbill, dark-eyed junco, and pine siskin. Migrating flocks of dark-eyed juncos may consume vast quantities of seeds and freshly germinated seedlings. Woodpeckers commonly feed in the bark of Rocky Mountain Douglas-fir. Blue grouse forage on needles and buds in winter; they and other birds rely heavily on Rocky Mountain Douglas-fir communities for cover.

The Douglas-fir is vulnerable to infestation by a woolly aphid, Adelges cooleyi that also infects the Engelmann spruce to complete its lifecycle.

== Uses ==
Rocky Mountain Douglas-fir is a valuable timber tree. The wood is exceptionally strong and is used for structural timber as well as poles, plywood, pulp, dimensional lumber, railroad ties, mine timbers, log cabins, posts and poles, fencing, and firewood. Other uses listed include "machine-stress-rated lumber", glued-laminated (Glulam) beams, pallets, furniture, cabinets, doors, flooring, window frames, and other miscellaneous woodwork and millwork. Rocky Mountain Douglas-firs are also cut and sold as Christmas trees.
