= Heinrich Mayr =

German scientist (1854–1911)

Heinrich Mayr (29 October 1854 – 24 January 1911) was a German forest scientist, dendrologist and university professor whose research and teaching shaped forest botany in the late nineteenth and early twentieth centuries. His standard botanical author abbreviation is Mayr.

== Life and career ==
Mayr was born in Landsberg am Lech, the son of the Bavarian senior forester Clemens Mayr. After the Ludwigsgymnasium in Munich he spent two years at the Royal Forestry Academy in Aschaffenburg, followed by a one-year political-economy course at the Ludwig-Maximilians-Universität München, where he joined the Akademischer Gesangverein. From 1879, he served as a trainee forester in the Alpine foreland and, having passed the state examination in 1880, became assistant to the eminent mycologist Robert Hartig at the Bavarian Forestry Research Station. Under Hartig, he earned a doctorate in 1884 with a Latin thesis on the birch parasites Fomitopsis betulina and Phellinus laevigatus, and the same year submitted his habilitation on the comparative anatomy of secretory organs in Norway spruce and European larch.

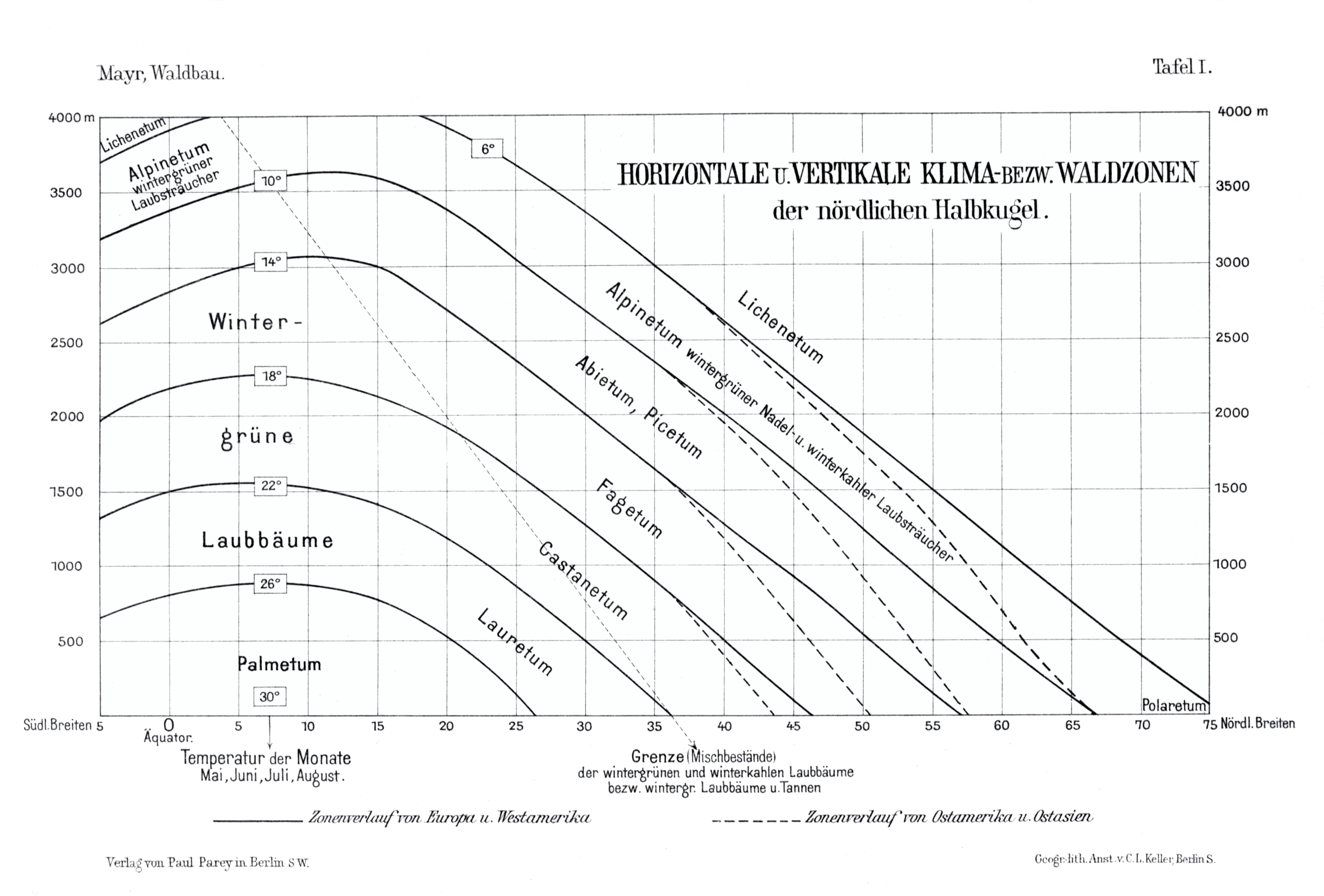
Mayr's classification of phytoclimatic zones in Waldbau auf naturgesetzlicher Grundlage, 1909

Supported by the Bavarian forestry administration, Mayr then undertook a two-year circumnavigation (North America, Japan, China, Java, British India) to assess the silvicultural potential of foreign tree species for European forestry. From 1888 to 1891 he taught botany at the Imperial Forestry School in Tokyo, gaining first-hand knowledge of the Japanese flora. His travel observations appeared in three influential monographs (1890–1891) that combined systematic, geographical and economic perspectives and warned presciently against the destructive logging practices then prevalent in the United States. In 1893, the Ludwig-Maximilians-Universität München appointed him to the chair of silviculture and forest production science as successor to Karl Gayer. With Hartig he established an experimental arboretum of exotic trees in the Grafrath teaching forest and, through further European study tours, became an authority on seed provenance. A third world tour in 1902 with Crown Prince Rupprecht of Bavaria inspired his popular illustrated handbook Fremdländische Wald- und Parkbäume für Europa ('Exotic forest and park trees for Europe') published in 1906.

Mayr maintained wide contacts—he chaired the Bavarian Horticultural Society, corresponded with the International Union of Forest Research Organizations and attracted foreign students such as Aimo Cajander and Walter Schädelin. His attempt to supersede Gayer's high-forest doctrine with a small-stand approach in Waldbau auf naturgesetzlicher Grundlage (1909) provoked sharp practical criticism, yet the textbook reached a second edition (1925) and remains a landmark in close-to-nature silviculture. On 19 January 1911 he collapsed from a stroke while lecturing and died five days later, leaving two sons and two daughters. He is buried in Munich's Waldfriedhof (grave 42-W-22).

== Selected publications ==
- Mayr, Heinrich (1884). "Polyporus betulinus und Polyporus laevigatus, zwei Parasiten der Birke" [Polyporus betulinus and Polyporus laevigatus, two parasites of the birch]. Botanisches Centralblatt (in German).
- Mayr, Heinrich (1885). Entstehung und Vertheilung der Secretions-Organe der Fichte und Lärche. Eine vergleichende anatomische Studie [Origin and distribution of the secretory organs of spruce and larch: a comparative anatomical study] (in German). Kassel: Theodor Fischer.
- Mayr, Heinrich (1890). Die Waldungen von Nordamerika, ihre Holzarten, deren Anbaufähigkeit und forstlicher Werth für Europa im allgemeinen und Deutschland insbesondere [The forests of North America, their timber species, their suitability for cultivation and forestry value for Europe in general and Germany in particular] (in German). Munich: M. Rieger. doi:10.5962/bhl.title.44999.
- Mayr, Heinrich (1890). Monographie der Abietineen des Japanischen Reiches (Tannen, Fichten, Tsugen, Lärchen und Kiefern). In systematischer, geographischer und forstlicher Beziehung [Monograph of the Abietineae of the Japanese Empire (firs, spruces, hemlocks, larches and pines): systematic, geographical and forestry aspects] (in German). Munich: R. Friedländer.
- Mayr, Heinrich (1891). Aus den Waldungen Japan's. Beiträge zur Beurtheilung der Anbaufähigkeit und des Werthes der Japanischen Holzarten im deutschen Walde und Vorschläge zur Aufzucht derselben im forstlichen Kulturbetriebe [From the forests of Japan: assessing the cultivability and value of Japanese timber species in German forestry and proposals for their propagation] (in German). Munich: M. Rieger.
- Mayr, Heinrich (1894). Mayr, Heinrich (ed.). Das Harz der Nadelhölzer. Seine Entstehung, Vertheilung, Bedeutung und Gewinnung. Für Forstmänner, Botaniker und Techniker [The resin of conifers: its formation, distribution, significance and extraction] (in German). Berlin: Springer Berlin, Heidelberg. doi:10.1007/978-3-642-91945-9.
- Mayr, Heinrich (1898). "Ergebnisse forstlicher Anbauversuche mit japanischen, indischen, russischen und selteneren amerikanischen Holzarten in Bayern" [Results of silvicultural trials with Japanese, Indian, Russian and rarer American timber species in Bavaria]. Forstwissenschaftliches Centralblatt (in German). 20.
- Mayr, Heinrich (1906). Fremdländische Wald- und Parkbäume für Europa [Exotic forest and park trees for Europe] (in German). Berlin: P. Parey. doi:10.5962/bhl.title.30017.
- Mayr, Heinrich (1909). Waldbau auf naturgesetzlicher Grundlage. Ein Lehr- und Handbuch [Silviculture on a natural-scientific basis: a textbook and manual] (in German). Berlin: P. Parey. doi:10.5962/bhl.title.36351.

Mayr also revised Karl Gayer's standard work Die Forstbenutzung from the 9th edition (1903) onwards.
