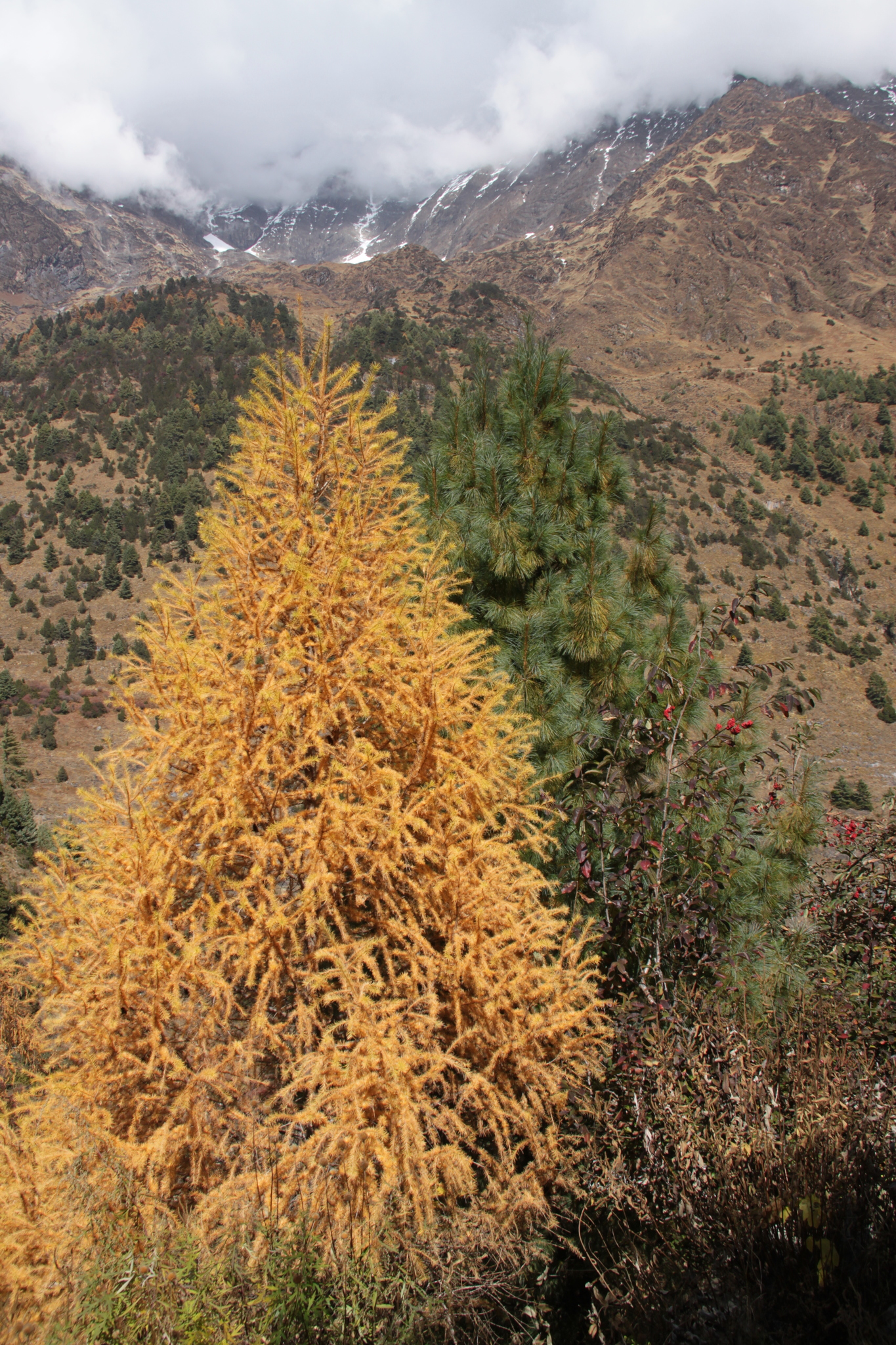
- With autumn colour in the Manaslu Conservation Area, Nepal

Scientific classification
- Kingdom: Plantae
- Clade: Tracheophytes
- Clade: Gymnospermae
- Division: Pinophyta
- Class: Pinopsida
- Order: Pinales
- Family: Pinaceae
- Genus: Larix
- Species: L. himalaica

Binomial name
- Larix himalaica W.C.Cheng & L.K.Fu

Synonyms
- Larix potaninii var. himalaica (W.C.Cheng & L.K.Fu) Farjon & Silba

= Larix himalaica =

Species of conifer

Larix himalaica, the Langtang larch, is a species of conifer in the genus Larix. As of June 2025, it is treated as Larix potaninii var. himalaica by Plants of the World Online, World Flora Online and other sources. It is native to the Himalayas in Gyirong (Jilong) in southern Tibet, from where it was described by the Chinese botanists Wan-Chun Cheng and Li-kuo Fu in 1975, and the adjacent Langtang and Manaslu areas of north-central Nepal; it occurs at altitudes of 3,000–3,500 m.

It is a deciduous tree growing to 40 m tall. The foliage is similar to other larches, with single needles on long shoots and dense clusters on short shoots; they are 1–2.5 cm long, green in summer, and colour up yellow in autumn. The cones are erect, 2–6.5 cm long, purple when immature, ripening dark brown, with typically 30–40 scales; the scales have long, exserted bracts.

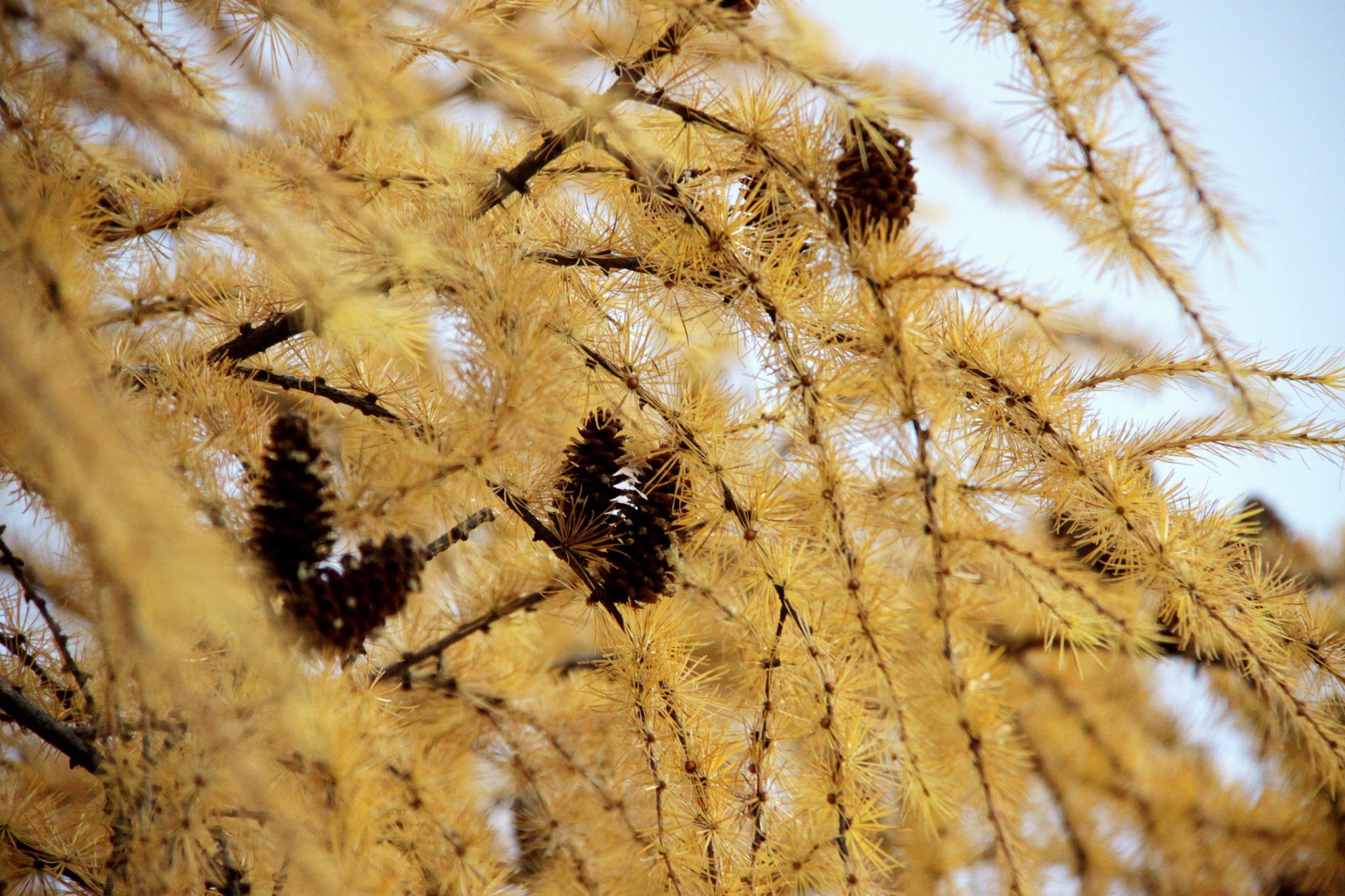
Foliage and cones in autumn; Manaslu Conservation Area, Nepal

== Taxonomy ==
It is closely related to Larix griffithii from a short distance further east along the Himalaya in eastern Nepal eastwards. A genetic study in 2024 has shown that it should probably be treated as a variety or subspecies of L. griffithii, but the necessary formal new combination has yet to be made.

It has otherwise often been treated as a variety of Larix potaninii, but this species from over 1,000 km further east in Sichuan and Yunnan in China proved significantly more distantly related in the 2024 study, so is not a parsomonious treatment.
