= Larix mastersiana =

Conservation status
- Endangered (IUCN 3.1)

Scientific classification
- Kingdom: Plantae
- Clade: Embryophytes
- Clade: Tracheophytes
- Clade: Spermatophytes
- Clade: Gymnosperms
- Division: Pinophyta
- Class: Pinopsida
- Order: Pinales
- Family: Pinaceae
- Genus: Larix
- Species: L. mastersiana

Binomial name
- Larix mastersiana Rehder & E.H.Wilson

Species of conifer

Larix mastersiana is a species of larch in the family Pinaceae. It is found only in western China in west-central Sichuan around Guanxian (now Dujiangyan City) west of the Min River, where it grows at 2,000–3,500 metres altitude. It is threatened by timber harvest and habitat loss. It is a deciduous coniferous tree growing to 20–25 metres tall, with yellow-brown bark on young trees, becoming grey on older trees. The leaves are 12–35 mm (mostly 20–30 mm) long. The cones are 2.5–4.5 cm long, with exserted bracts.

Its status as a distinct species has recently been questioned, as it is genetically nested within the very similar Larix potaninii which occurs in the same area; it may be better treated as a synonym of that species, or a variety of it.
