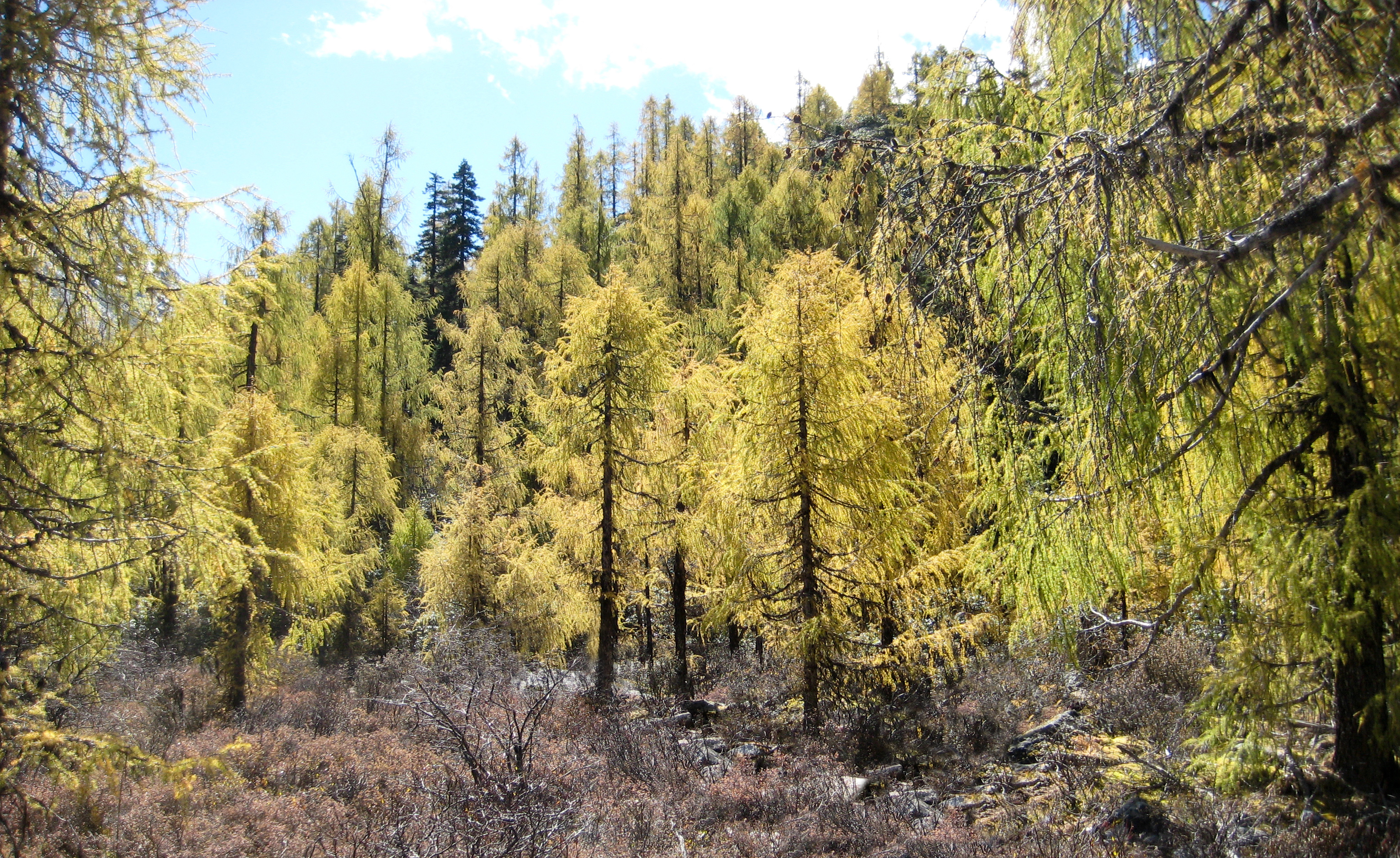
- Larix potaninii in autumn colour, Huluhai, Sichuan

Conservation status
- Least Concern (IUCN 3.1)

Scientific classification
- Kingdom: Plantae
- Clade: Embryophytes
- Clade: Tracheophytes
- Clade: Spermatophytes
- Clade: Gymnosperms
- Division: Pinophyta
- Class: Pinopsida
- Order: Pinales
- Family: Pinaceae
- Genus: Larix
- Species: L. potaninii

Binomial name
- Larix potaninii Batalin

= Larix potaninii =

Species of conifer

Larix potaninii (Potanin's larch or Chinese larch) is a species of larch in the family Pinaceae. It is found only in west-central China, in the provinces of southeastern Gansu, southern Shaanxi, Sichuan, eastern Tibet, and northwestern Yunnan, where it grows at altitudes of 2,000–4,300 metres. It is named after the Russian botanist and explorer Grigory Potanin who discovered it in May 1893 near Ta-tsien-lu (now Kangding) in western Sichuan.

It is a deciduous coniferous tree growing to 20–50 metres tall, with reddish-brown bark on young trees, becoming grey on older trees. The leaves are 12–35 mm long. The cones are erect, 2.5–5.5 cm long (to 7.5 cm, rarely even 9 cm, in var. australis), with exserted bracts.

== Varieties ==
The Flora of China accepts three varieties:

- Larix potaninii var. chinensis L.K.Fu & Nan Li – to the northeast of var. potaninii in southern Shaanxi
- Larix potaninii var. potaninii – west-central China in southeastern Gansu, southern Shaanxi, Sichuan, eastern Tibet
- Larix potaninii var. australis A.Henry (syn. var. macrocarpa Y.W.Law) – to the south of var. potaninii in southwest Sichuan and northwest Yunnan
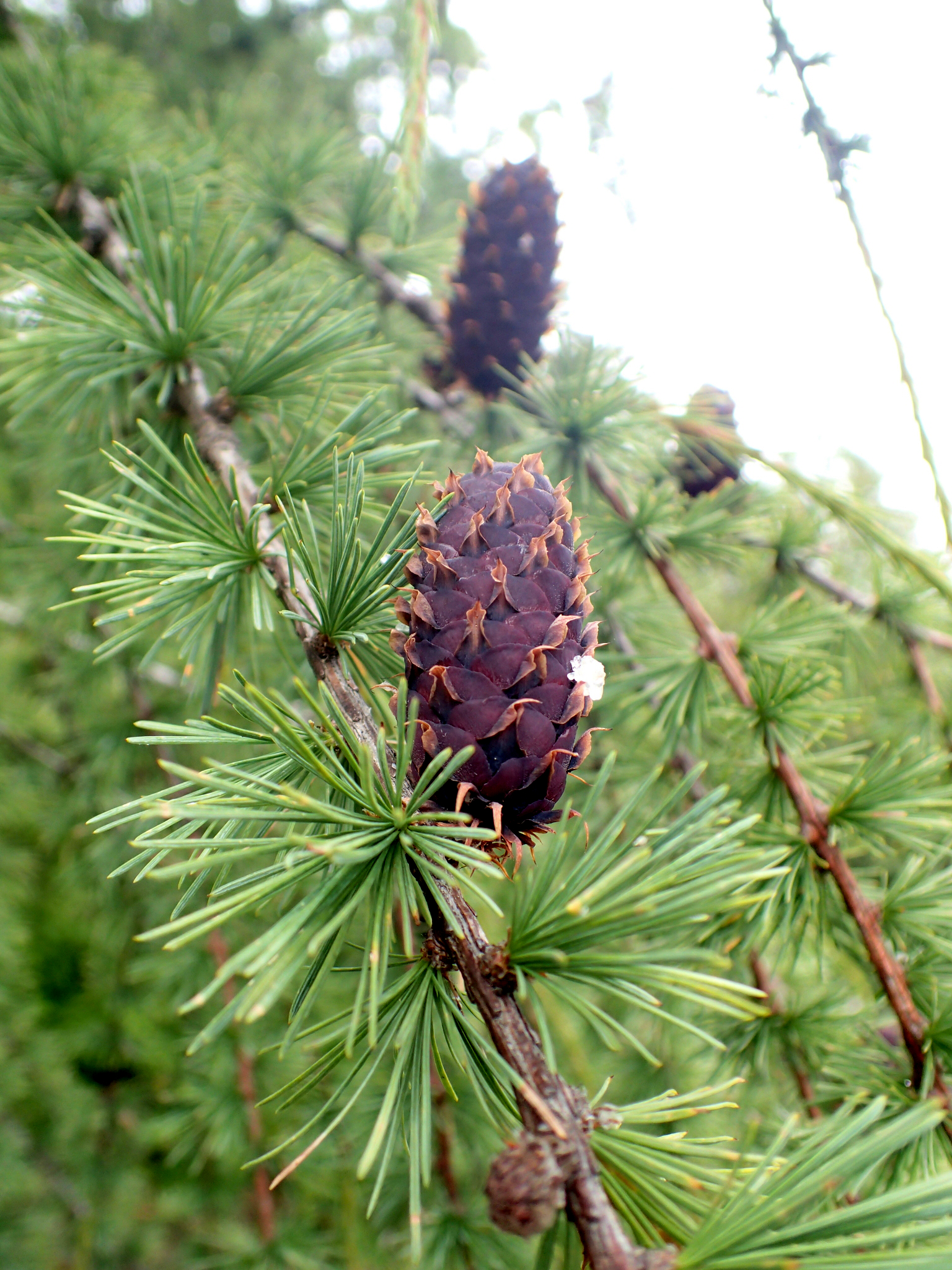
Larix potaninii var. potaninii from near the type locality of Kangding, Sichuan

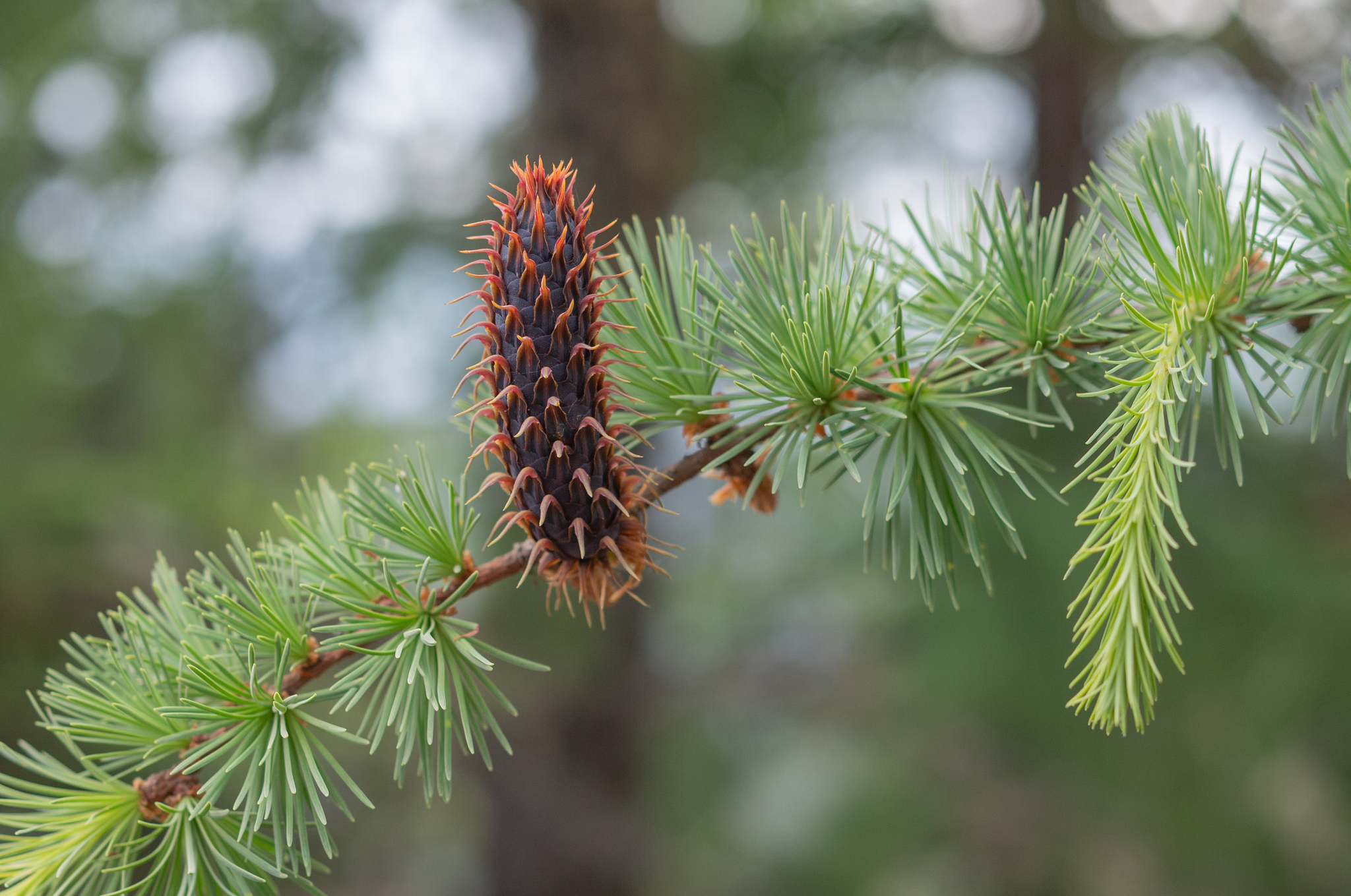
Larix potaninii var. australis, near Lijiang, Yunnan

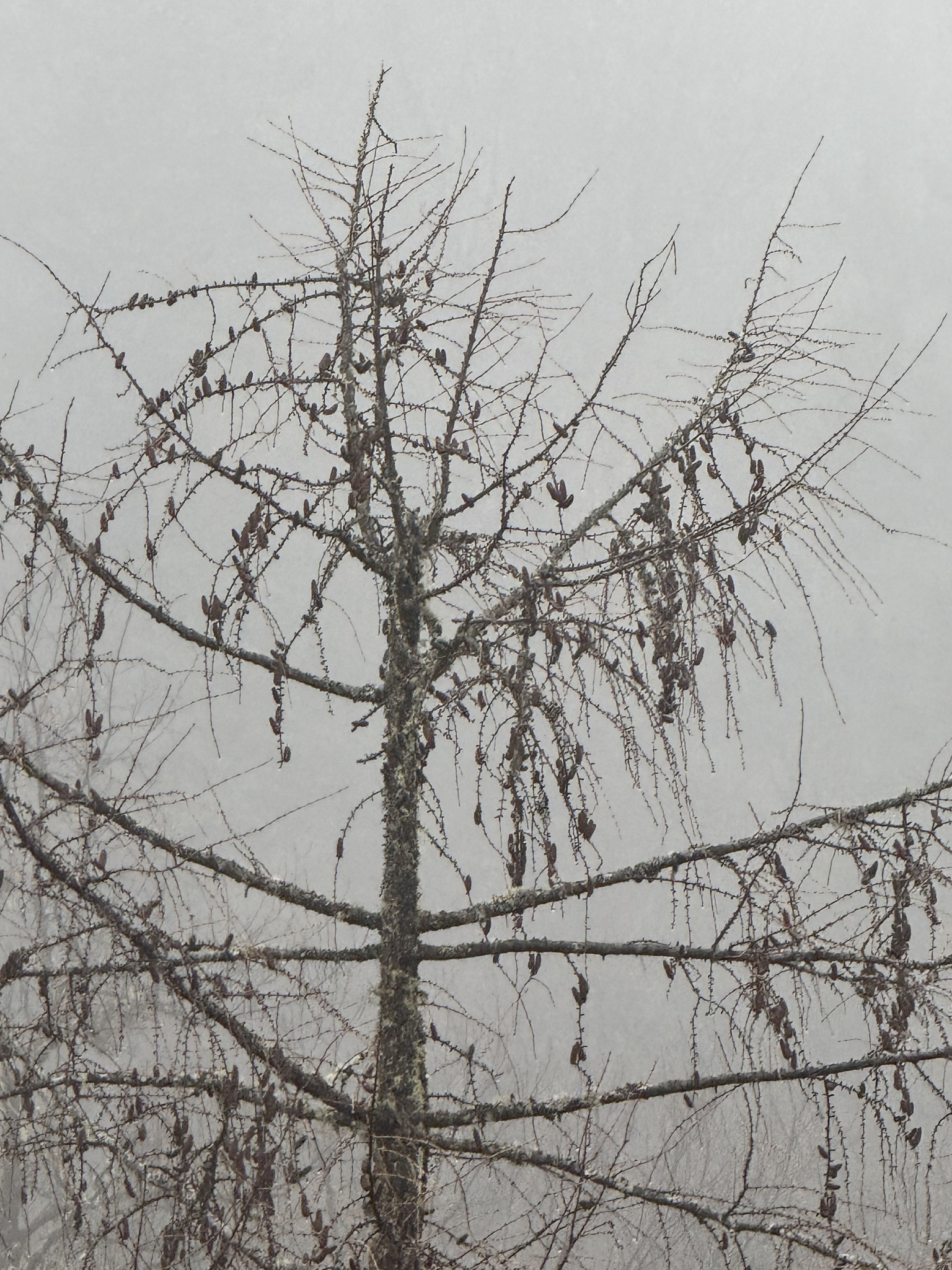
Larix potaninii var. potaninii in winter

Another larch from 1,500 km to the west in the central Himalaya, treated by the Flora of China as Larix himalaica, is treated by the Plants of the World Online database as a fourth variety Larix potaninii var. himalaica (W.C.Cheng & L.K.Fu) Farjon & Silba, but recent genetic evidence does not support this treatment, placing it instead as a close relative of Larix griffithii of the eastern Himalaya, to which it is also much closer geographically.

Conversely, the status of Larix mastersiana as a distinct species has been questioned by the same genetic data; it is genetically nested within Larix potaninii, with which it occurs in the same area of western Sichuan; L. mastersiana may be better treated as a synonym of that species, or a variety of it.
