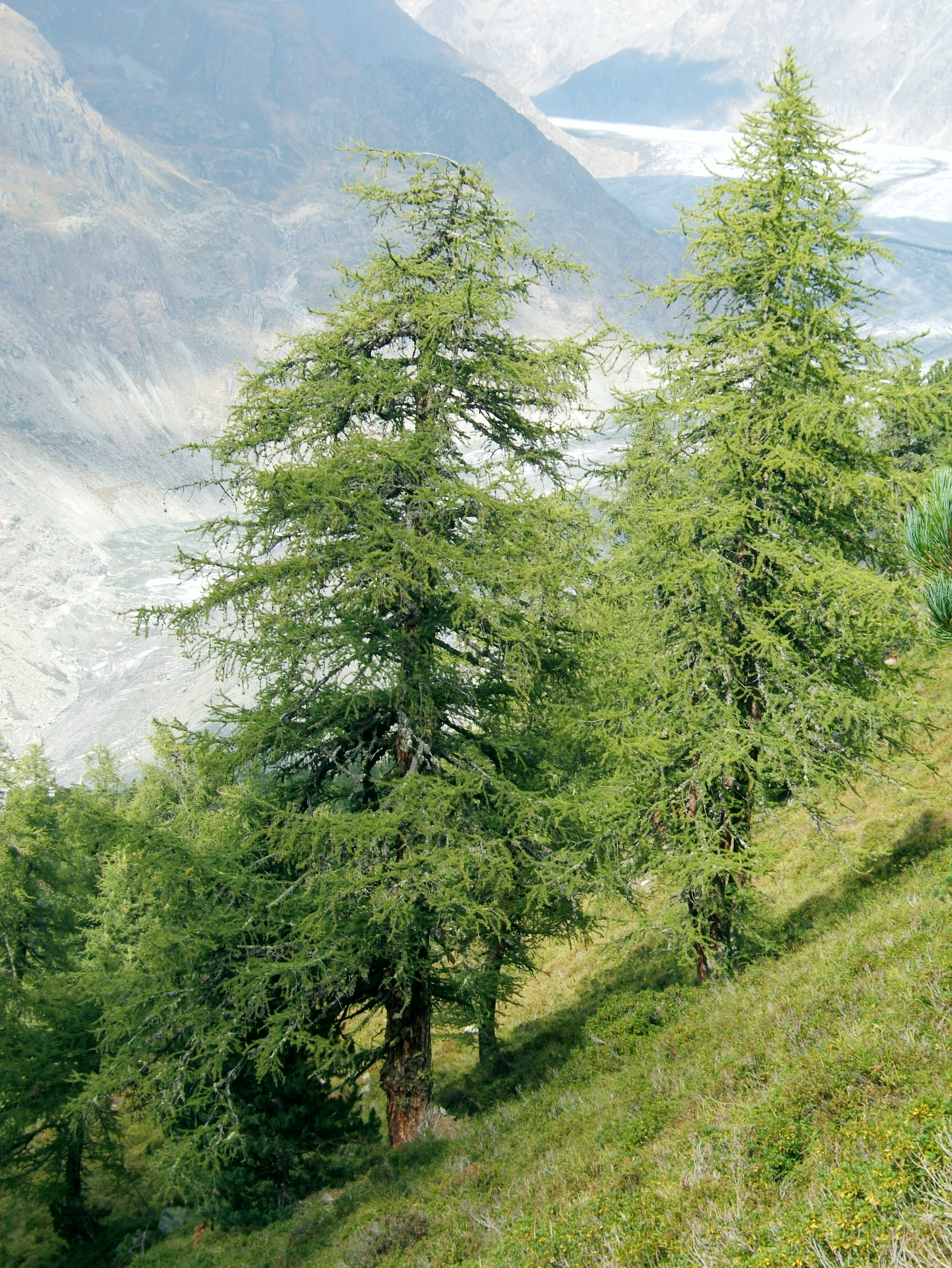
- Larix decidua in Aletschwald, Switzerland

Scientific classification
- Kingdom: Plantae
- Clade: Tracheophytes
- Clade: Gymnosperms
- Division: Pinophyta
- Class: Pinopsida
- Order: Pinales
- Family: Pinaceae
- Subfamily: Laricoideae
- Genus: Larix; Mill.

Type species
- Larix decidua Mill.

Species
- About 10–14; see text

= Larch =

Larch Temporal range: Paleogene–Recent

Genus of deciduous conifers

Larches are deciduous conifers in the genus Larix, of the pine family, Pinaceae. Growing to as much as 60 m (195 ft) tall, they are native to the cooler regions of the Northern Hemisphere. They grow in lowland forests in the far north, and high in mountains further south. Larches are among the dominant plants in the boreal forests of Siberia and Canada, making them the most abundant genus of trees on earth. Larch wood is tough and relatively durable; it is used in boatbuilding, cladding, decking, garden furniture, fencing, and construction. Products extracted from larch include arabinogalactan (larch gum), rosin, turpentine, and an essential oil.

== Etymology ==
The English name larch was recorded in 1548 by the botanist William Turner. It derives from the German Lärche, in turn from the Middle High German larche, which is conjectured to derive from an unrecorded Old High German name for the tree, *larihha. That derives from the Latin name of the tree, Larix. The Latin name probably was borrowed from a Gaulish language spoken in the Alps.

== Description ==
Larch botanical illustration labelled

=== Habit and foliage ===
The tallest species, Larix occidentalis, can reach 50 to 60 m (165 to 195 ft). Larch tree crowns are sparse, with the major branches horizontal and in whorls; the second and third order branchlets are roughly horizontal in some species, pendulous in others. Larch shoots are dimorphic, with needle-like leaves borne singly on long shoots with several buds, and in dense clusters of 20–50 needles on short shoots with only a single bud. Larch wood is resinous. The bark of young trees is smooth; that of older trees is thick and scaly. Larches are among the few deciduous conifers, which are usually evergreen.

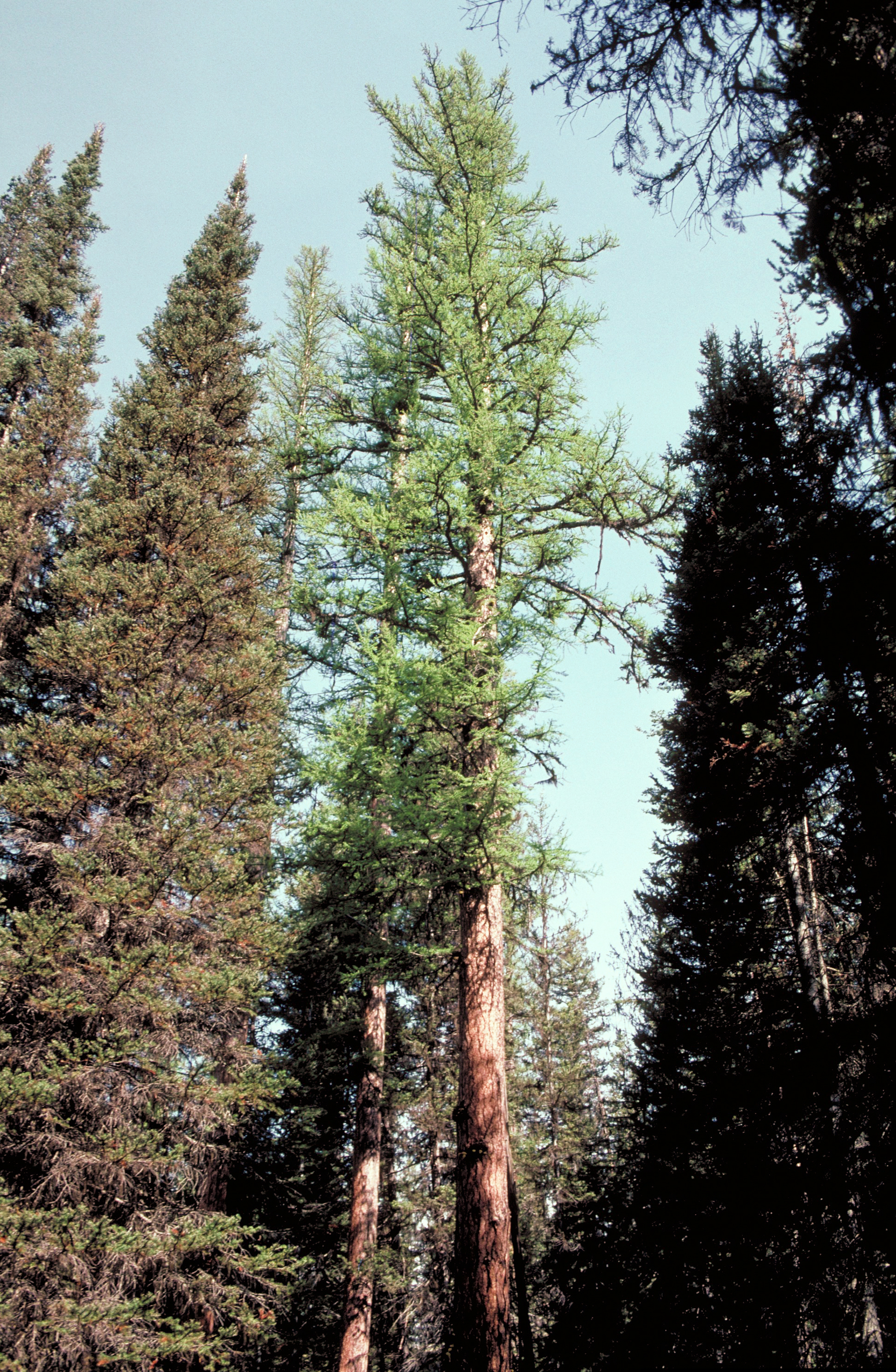
Larix occidentalis can reach 60 m (195 ft) in height. Oregon

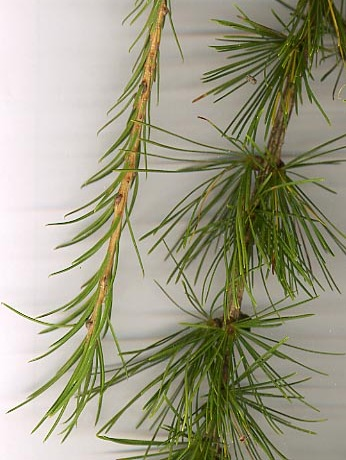
Larch shoots (here Larix decidua) are dimorphic, with long shoots with widely spaced needles, and short shoots with dense clusters of leaves.

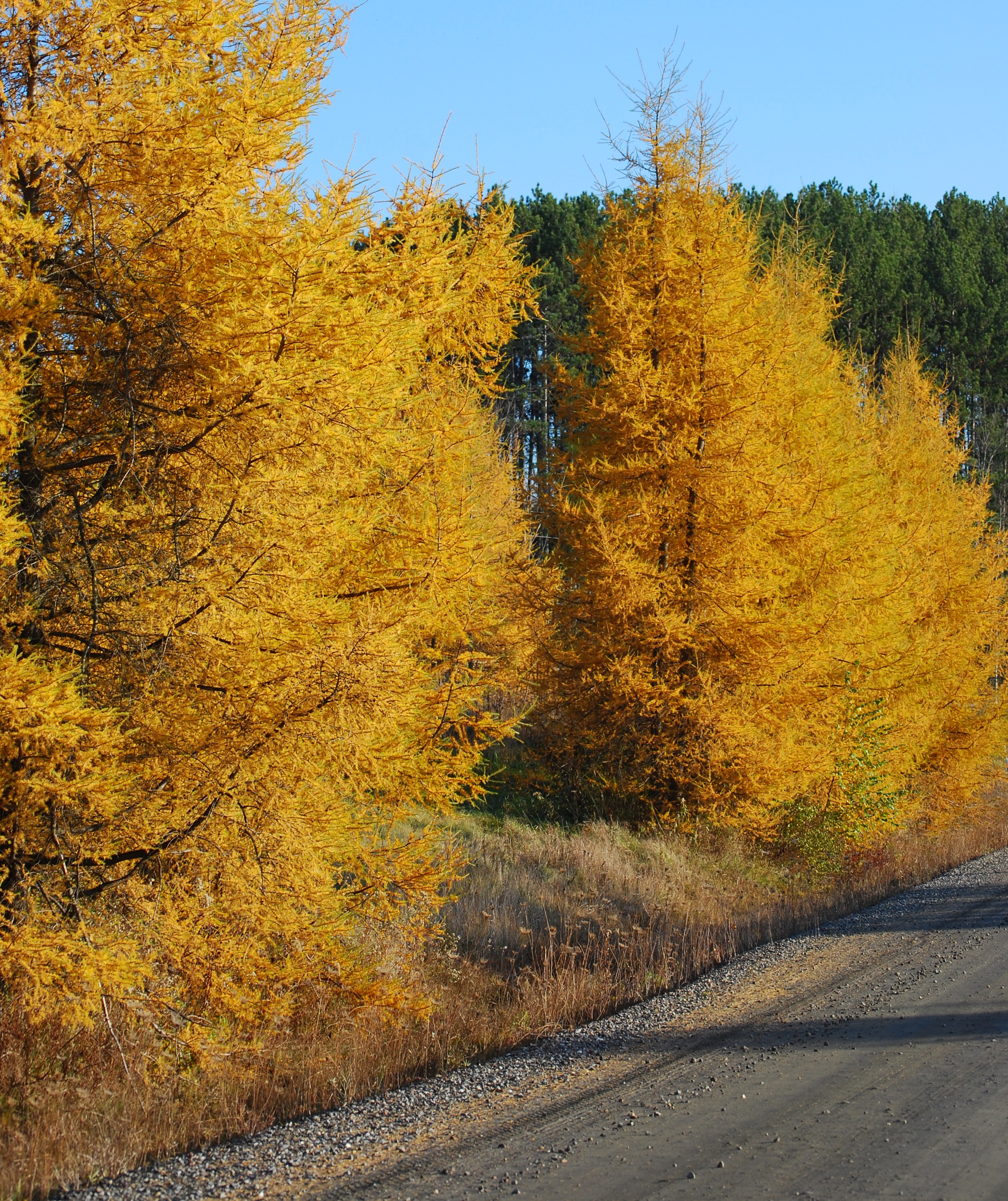
Larches, like this
Larix laricina in Vermont, are deciduous, dropping their leaves in autumn

=== Cones ===
The male (pollen) cones are small, on the ends of shoots that die after pollination. The female (seed) cones are small, typically erect, and take 4–7 months to reach maturity after pollination. The seed scales spread apart when mature, allowing the winged seeds, two per scale, to fall out. The leaflike bract scales can be either long and visible (exserted) or short and hidden between the seed scales.

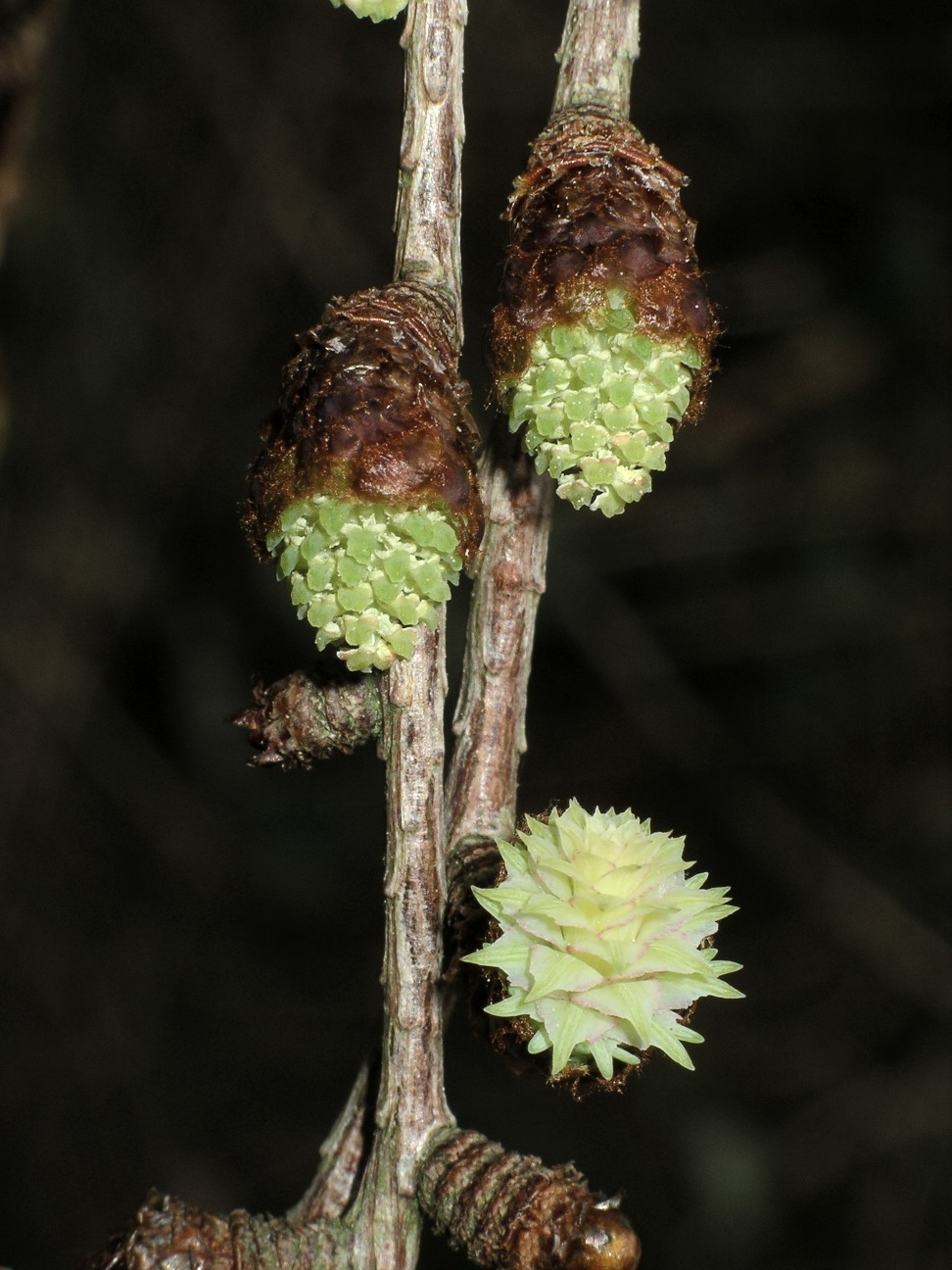
Male (above) and female (below right) cones of Larix kaempferi emerging in spring, Japan

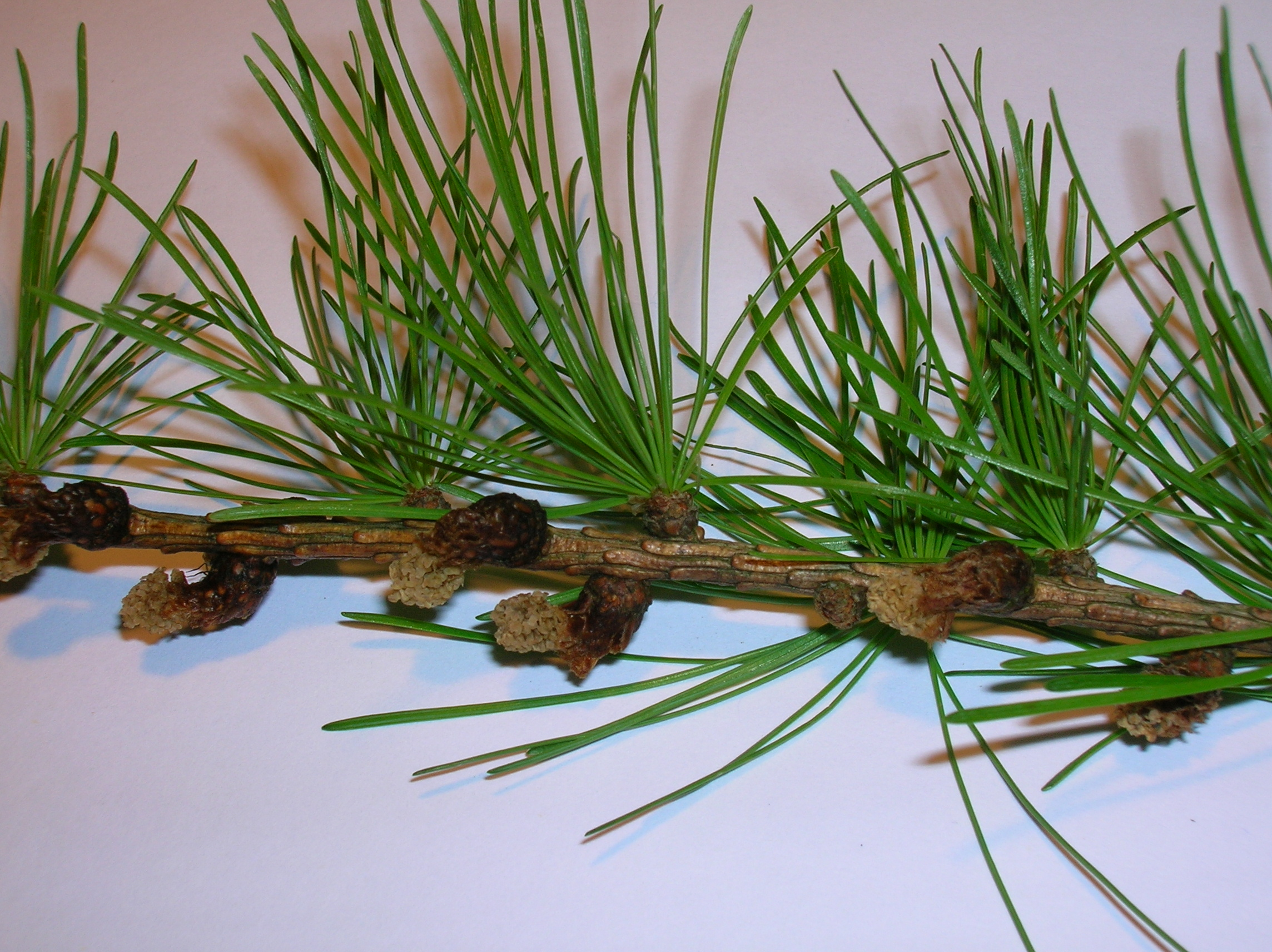
Larix decidua male cones, Scotland

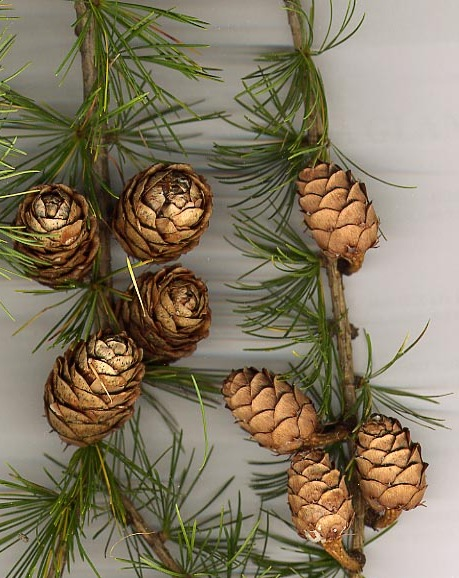
Larix decidua female cones

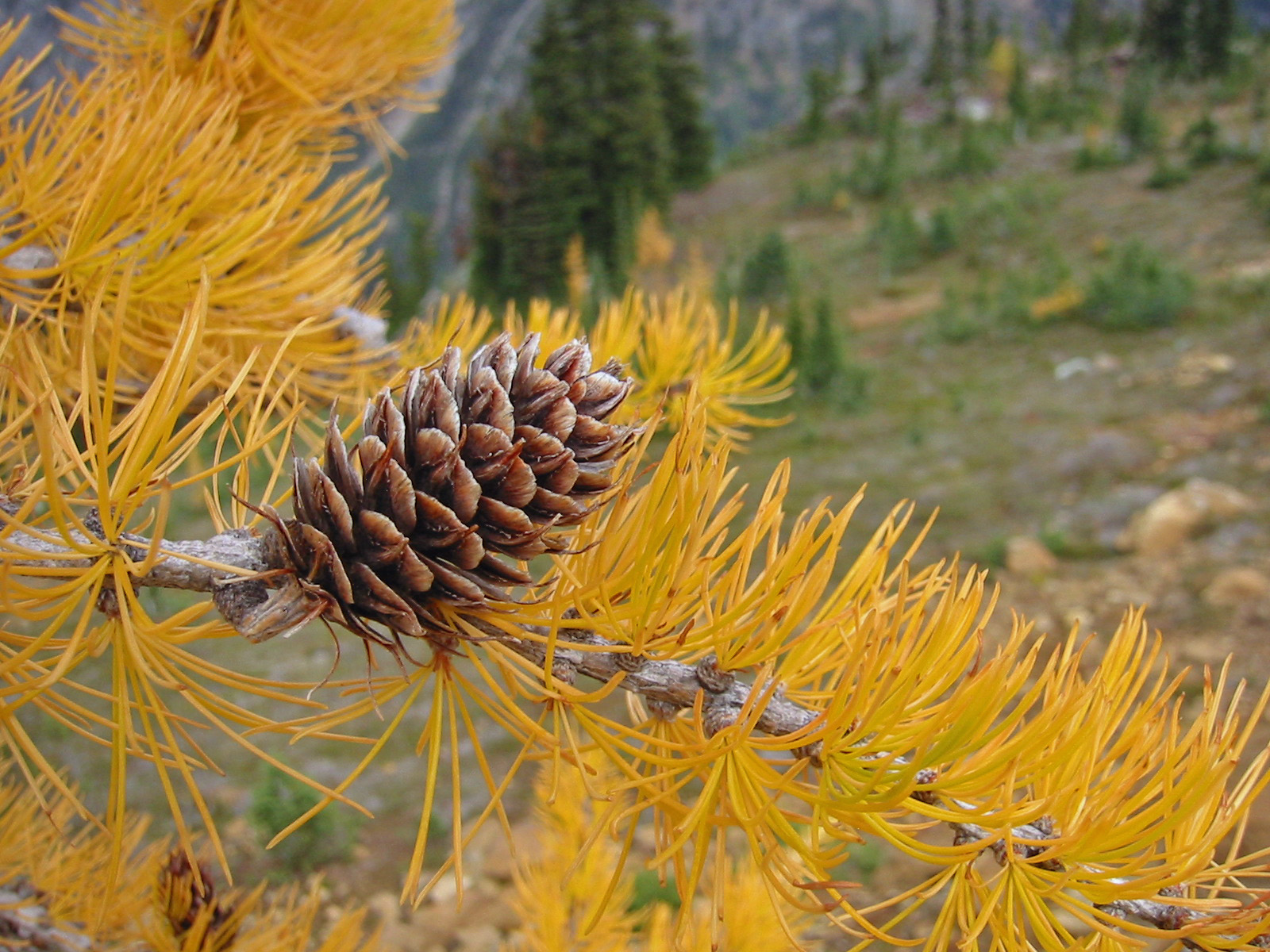
Larix lyallii autumn foliage and cone, Washington state

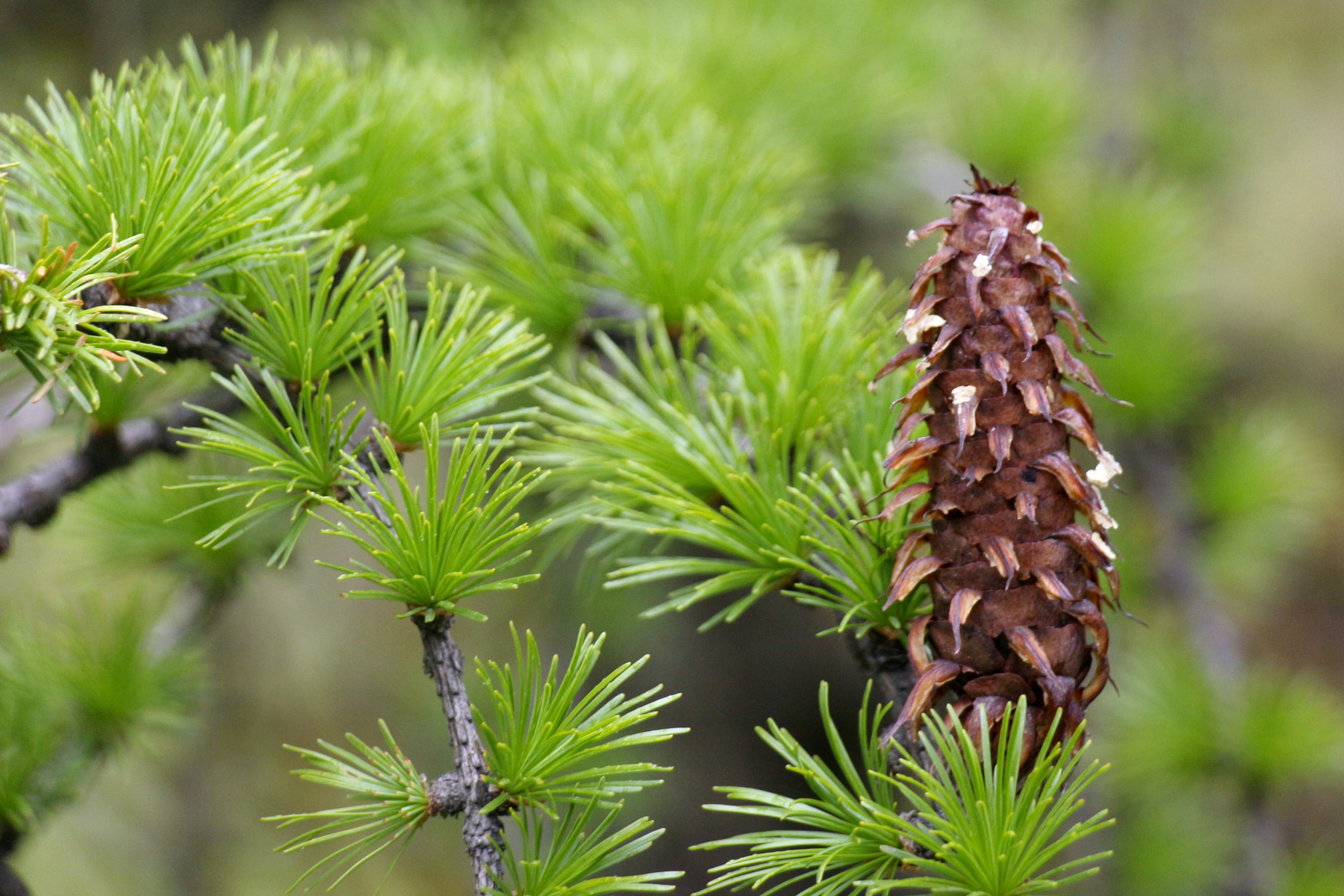
Larix griffithii foliage and cone, Sikkim

The chromosome number is 2n = 24, similar to that of most of the other species of the family Pinaceae.

== Distribution ==
The genus Larix is present in all the temperate-cold zones of the Northern Hemisphere, from North America to northern Siberia, passing through Europe, mountainous China and Japan. The larches are important forest trees of Russia, Central Europe, the United States and Canada. They require a cool and fairly humid climate, and for this reason, their distribution includes the mountains of the temperate zones, while in the northernmost boreal zones, they are also found in the plains. Larix grows further north than any other tree genus, in North America and Siberia reaching the tundra and polar ice. The larch species Larix gmelinii is the world's most northerly-growing tree, at 75° north in the Taymyr Peninsula.

Worldwide distribution of genus Larix.
The circumboreal and Sino-Himalayan groups are clades.
Positions are diagrammatic.

The larches are pioneer species not very demanding of the soil and they are very long-lived trees. They live in pure or mixed forests together with other conifers or more rarely with broad-leaved trees. In 1965, larch constituted 40.2% of the forests of the Soviet Union and had a cumulative volume of 28,450 million m^{3} (28.45 cubic kilometres, or 6.8 cubic miles) of solid wood; by a wide margin, the most abundant genus of trees on earth.

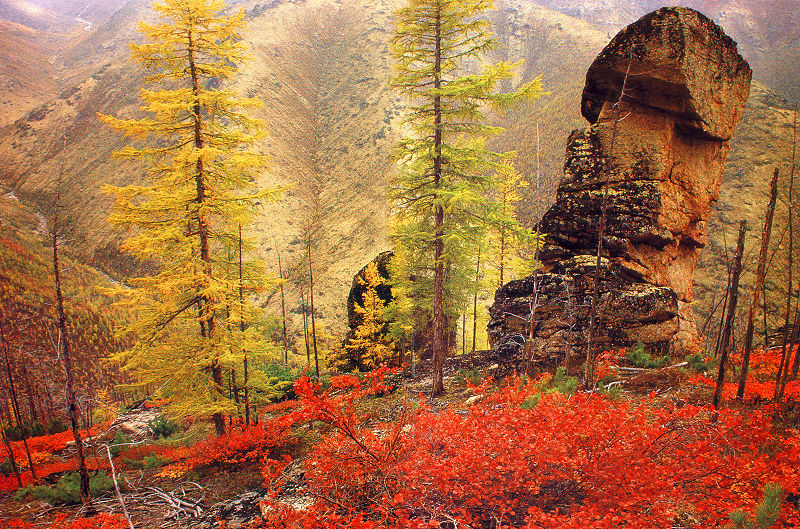
Larix sibirica in Khanty-Mansiya, Russia

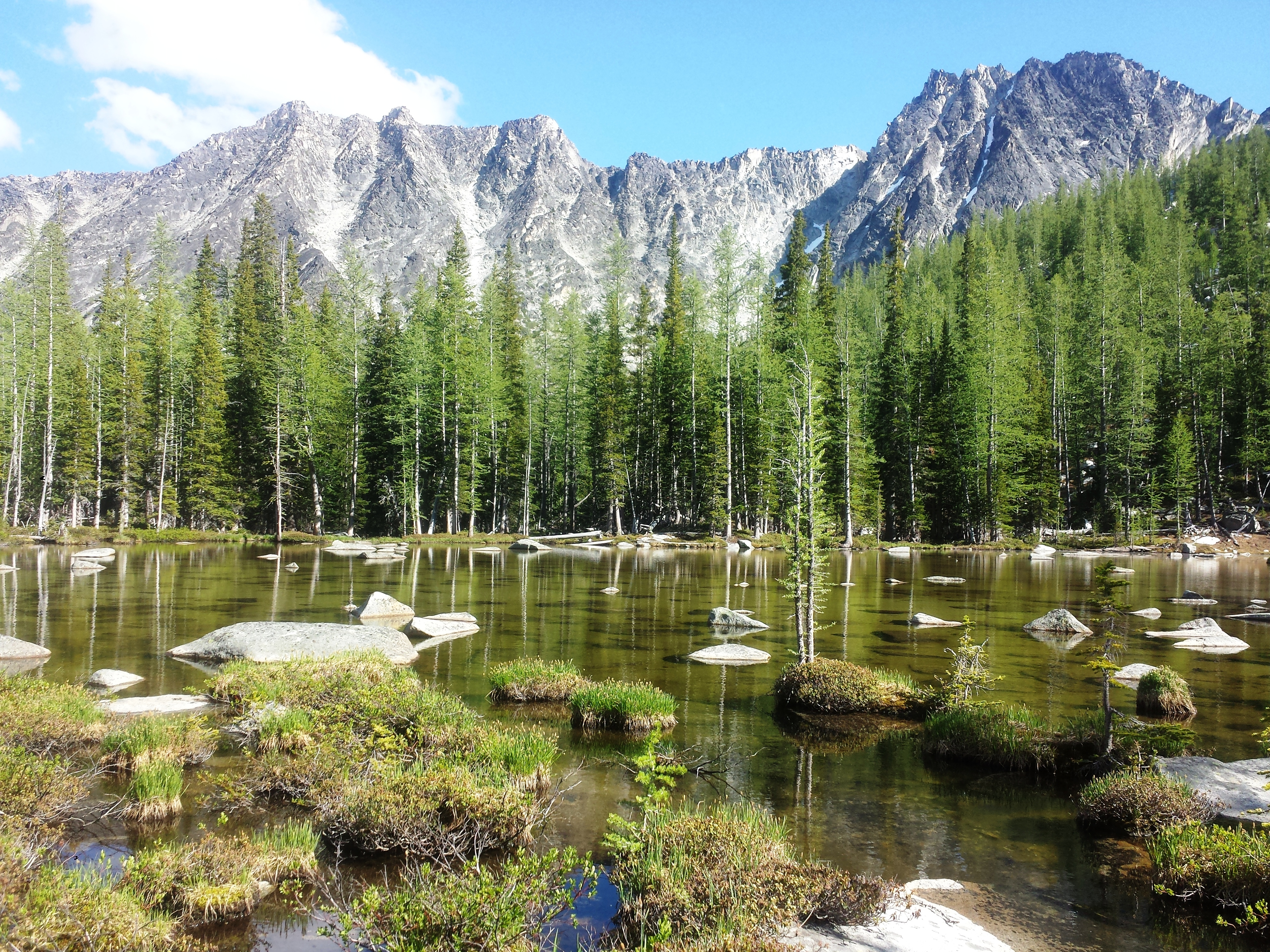
Larix lyallii forest in Washington state

== Evolution ==
=== External phylogeny ===
The genus Larix belongs to the subfamily Laricoideae, which includes the Douglas firs, genus Pseudotsuga. The genus Cathaya was included in some older studies, but based on transcriptome analysis, is now considered closer to Pinus and Picea. The split of Larix from Pseudotsuga occurred about 45 million years ago.

- Pinaceae
  - Abietoideae (firs, cedars, hemlocks)
  - Pinoideae
    - Lariceae
      - Pseudotsuga (Douglas firs)
      - Larix (larches)
    - Pineae
      - - Cathaya (1 sp.)
        - Picea (spruces)
      - Pinus (pines)

=== Taxonomy and internal phylogeny ===
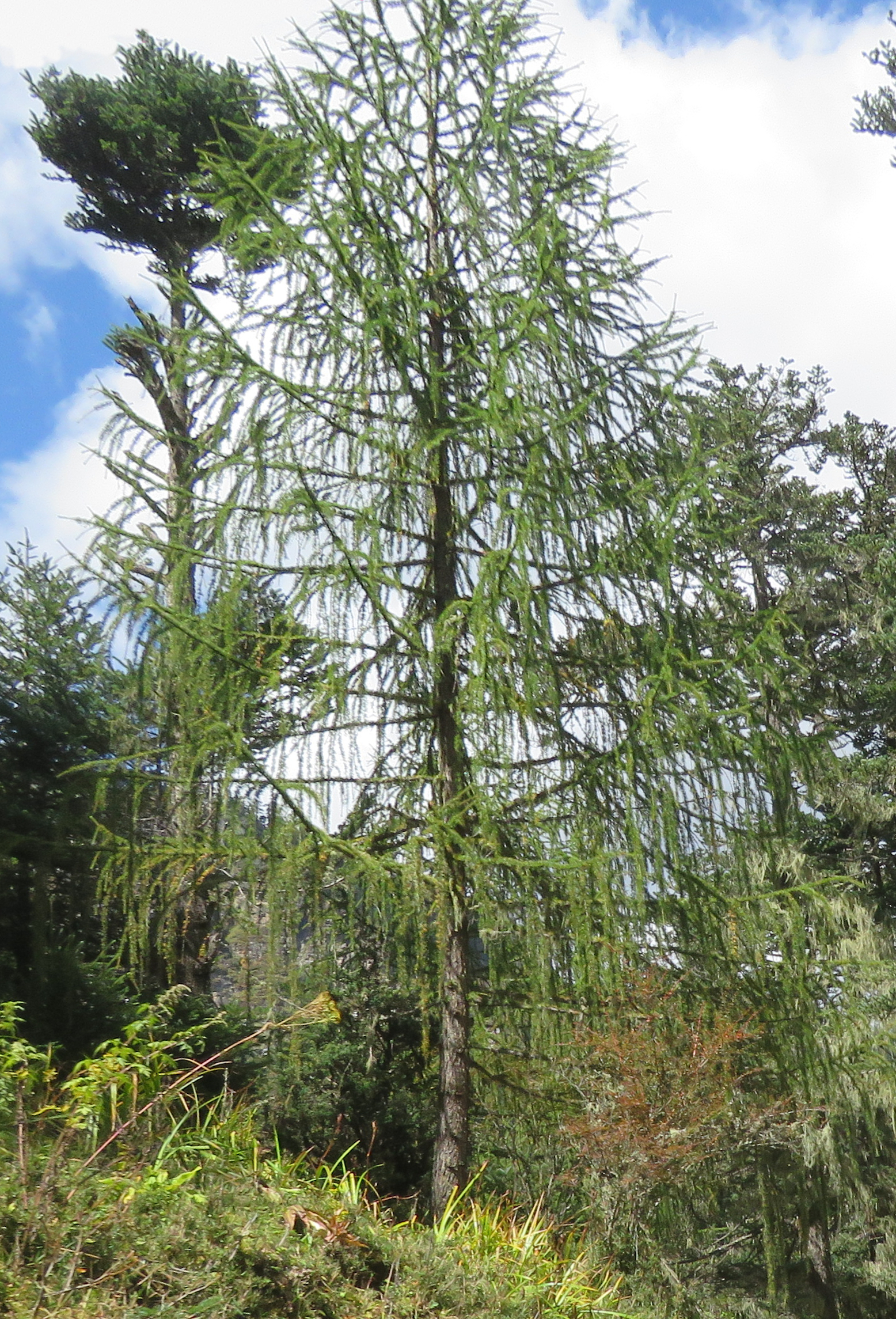
Larix griffithii in Bhutan, a species with long bracts. This attribute had been thought to define a group within the genus.

The genus Larix was described by the English botanist Philip Miller in 1754. In the 20th century, cone bract length was used to divide the larches into two sections (sect. Larix with short bracts, and sect. Multiserialis with long bracts), but genetic evidence does not support this division, indicating instead that the cone and bract size are merely adaptations to climatic conditions.

Late 20th century and early 21st century genetic studies proposed three groups within the genus, with a primary division into North American and Eurasian species, and a secondary division of the Eurasian into northern short-bracted species and southern long-bracted species; there was dispute over the position of Larix sibirica, a short-bracted species which is placed in the short-bracted group by some of the studies and the long-bracted group by others. Ten species and one natural hybrid of larch are accepted by Plants of the World Online (POWO), following the conservative treatment in Farjon (2010); several others are accepted by the Flora of China.

However, a 2025 study by Qiu and colleagues cast doubt on the species circumscriptions accepted by Farjon and the POWO; it showed that Larix himalaica is close to L. griffithii as geographic parsimony would predict (and not to L. potaninii as Farjon believed), and that L. speciosa is distinct and should be treated as a separate species. Conversely, they found that L. mastersiana was embedded within L. potaninii and may be best synonymised with it. Their results showed that the division between Old World and New World species as suggested by earlier studies is not correct, but rather, the primary divide is between the high-latitude circumboreal species, and the low latitude Sino-Himalayan species group, as shown in the cladogram.

- Larix
  - Circumboreal
    - North America
      - - L. occidentalis Nuttall – Western larch. NW United States, SW Canada
        - L. laricina (Du Roi) Koch – Tamarack or American larch. Alaska, Canada, NE United States
      - L. lyallii Parlatore – Subalpine larch. Mountains of NW United States, SW Canada, at very high altitude
    - Northern Eurasia
      - L. decidua Miller – European larch. Mountains of central Europe
      - - L. sibirica Ledeb. – Siberian larch. Plains of W Siberia
        - - L. kaempferi (Lamb.) Carrière – Japanese larch. Mountains of central Japan
          - L. gmelinii (Rupr.) Kuzen. – Dahurian larch. Plains of central and E Siberia
  - Qinghai-Tibetan Plateau
    - Hengduan Mountains
      - L. griffithii var speciosa Hooker – Yunnan larch
      - L. potaninii vars chinensis, macrocarpa, potaninii Batalin inc. L. mastersiana – (Chinese larch)
    - Eastern Himalayas
      - L. potaninii var himalaica Batalin – Langtang larch
      - L. griffithii var griffithii Hooker – Sikkim larch

=== Hybrids ===
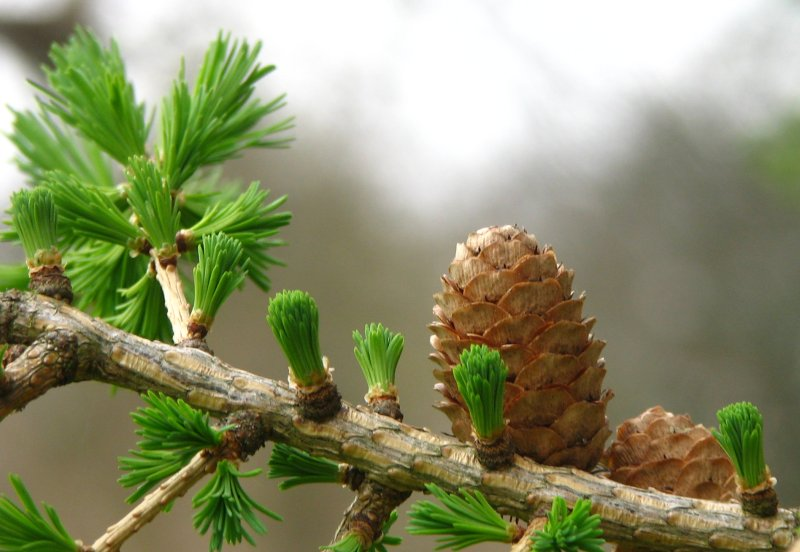
Larix × marschlinsii, the Dunkeld larch, a commercially important hybrid

Most larches can be hybridised in cultivation; these hybrids are not discussed by POWO as they are not of natural occurrence. Larix × marschlinsii Coaz (syn. L. × eurolepis), the Dunkeld larch, a hybrid of L. decidua × L. kaempferi, is by far the best known: it is of major importance in forestry in northern Europe. It arose more or less simultaneously in Switzerland and Scotland in 1901–1904. Other named hybrids include Larix × pendula (Sol.) Salisb. (L. decidua × L. laricina), and Larix × eurokurilensis Rohm. (L. decidua × L. gmelinii).

== Ecology ==
=== Species interactions ===
Larches are associated with some mycorrhizal fungal species, including species which primarily or only associate with larch. One of the most prominent of these is the larch bolete Suillus grevillei. Larch is used as a food plant by the larvae of moths such as the larch pug, Eupithecia lariciata. The large larch bark beetle, Ips cembrae, can be harmful to already-weakened larch trees, but is in general a less serious threat than a related species, the spruce bark beetle Ips typographus, is to spruces.

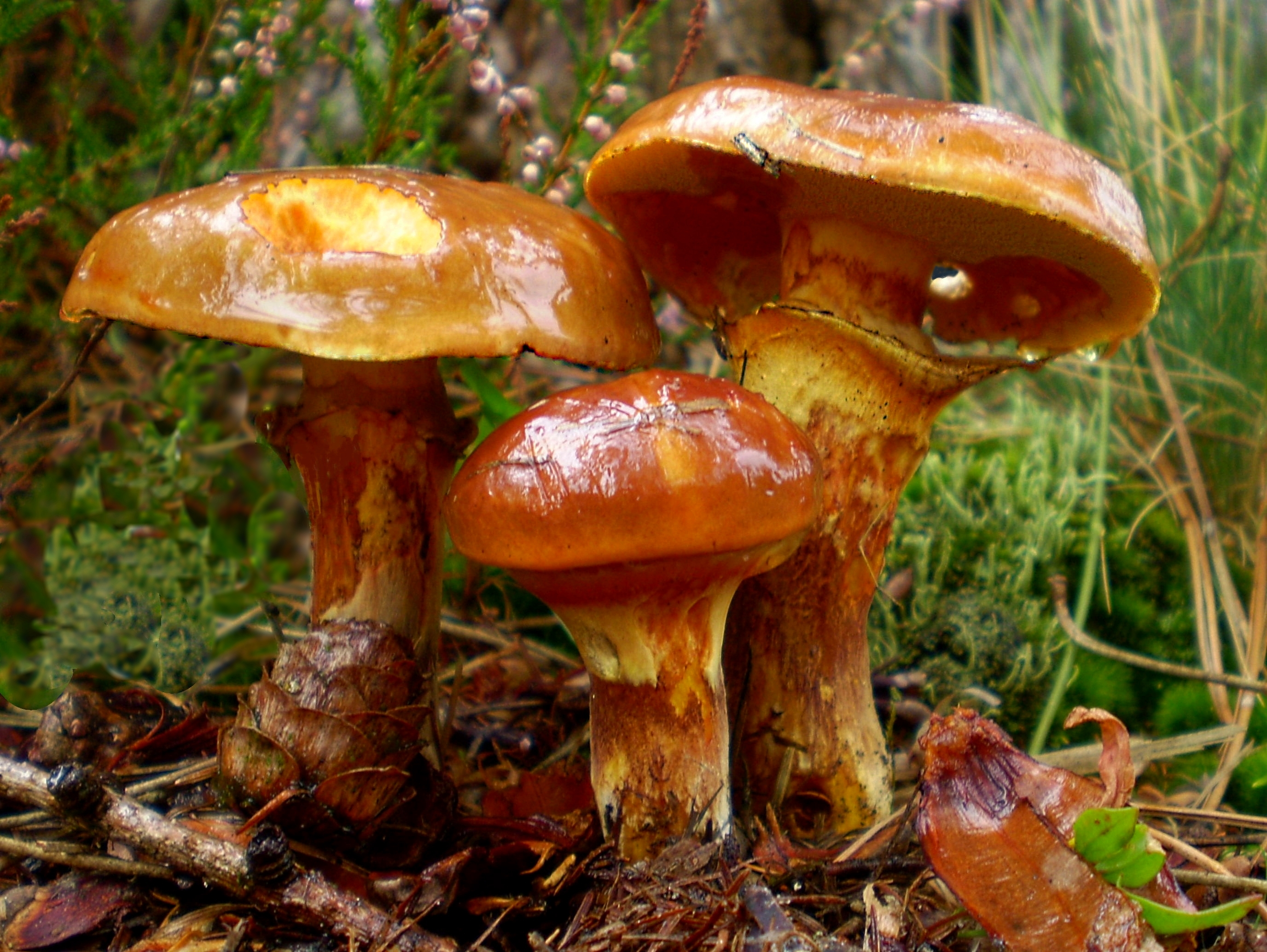
The larch bolete Suillus grevillei, a mycorrhizal mushroom, only grows under larches.

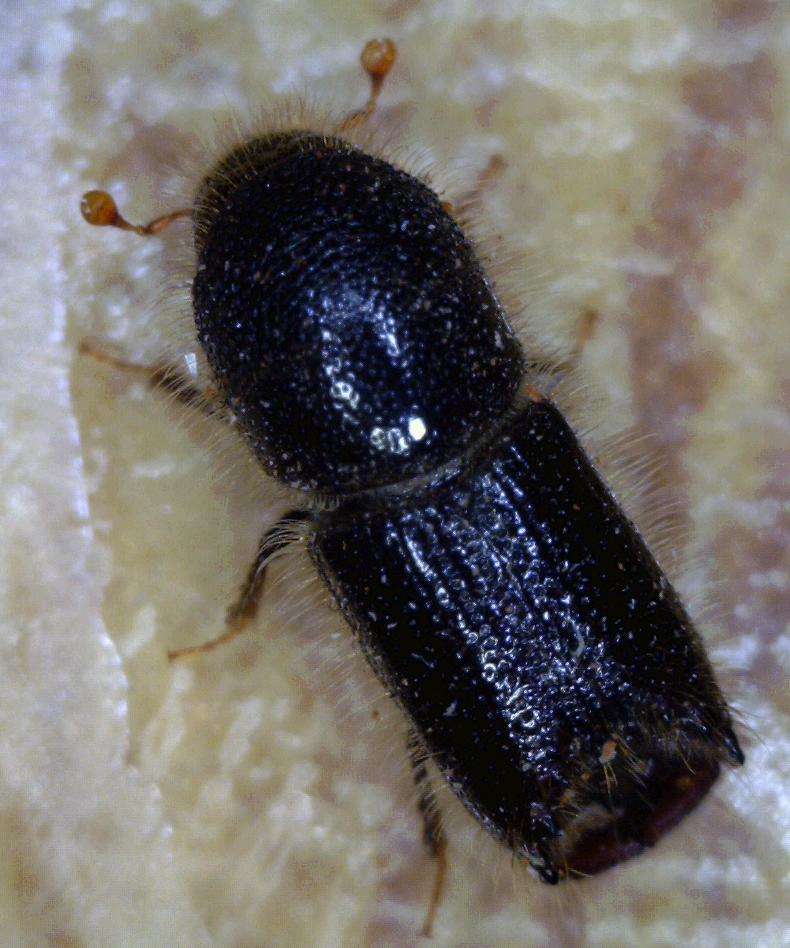
Adult large larch bark beetle, Ips cembrae

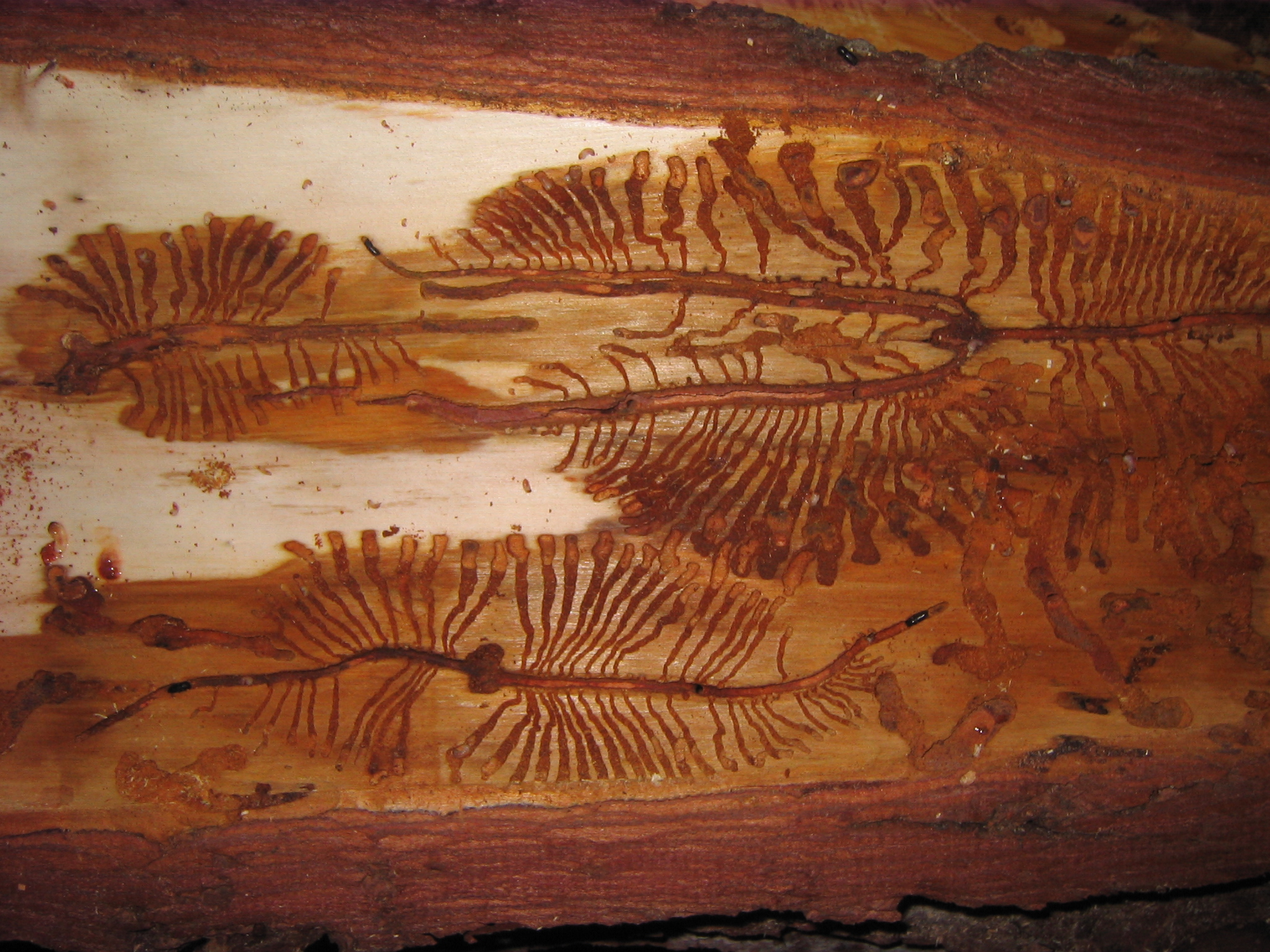
Galleries of Ips cembrae under the bark

=== Diseases ===
Larches are prone to the fungal canker disease Lachnellula spp. (larch canker); this is a problem when late spring frosts cause minor injuries to the tree, allowing entry to the fungal spores. In Canada, this disease was first detected in 1980; it kills Larix laricina of any age. Larches are vulnerable to Phytophthora ramorum. In 2013 the disease appeared in the Afan Forest Park in south Wales. Laricifomes officinalis is another mushroom found in Europe, North America and northern Asia that causes internal wood rot. It is almost exclusive to the genus Larix. Other diseases are caused by mushrooms, fungal rusts, and bacteria.

== Uses ==
Larch timber has many uses, including boatbuilding, exterior cladding, and interior panelling. Outdoor uses include fencing, gates, decking, garden furniture, and playground equipment. Since the heartwood is strong, durable, and available in large sizes, it is used for structures such as agricultural buildings. The Savill Building in Windsor Great Park has a timber roof shell made of many relatively thin laths, interlocking to provide strength. The wood is used, too, as fuel in industrial biomass energy plants. The bark used as a mulch in horticulture. Arabinogalactan, used in animal feed, cosmetics, and medicines, is extracted from heartwood. Larch trees can be tapped for liquid to be distilled into Venice turpentine. The tree yields rosin for violin bows and an essential oil used in aromatherapy. European Standard EN 350-2 lists larch as slightly to moderately durable. Dunkeld larch is widely grown as its timber is durable and strong, and the tree tolerates poor weather better than non-hybrid larches.

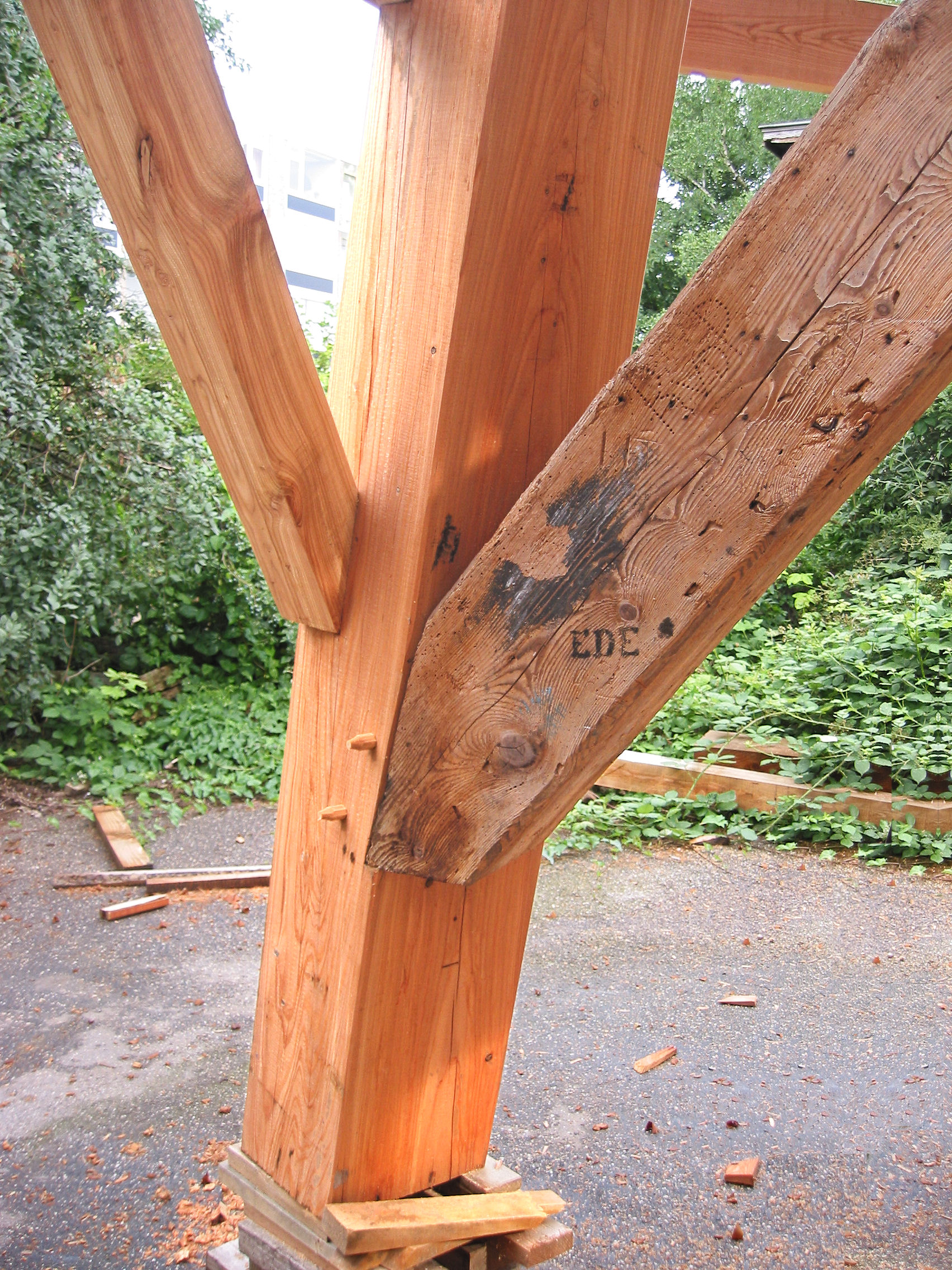
Larch wood in use to restore the Concordia mill, Netherlands

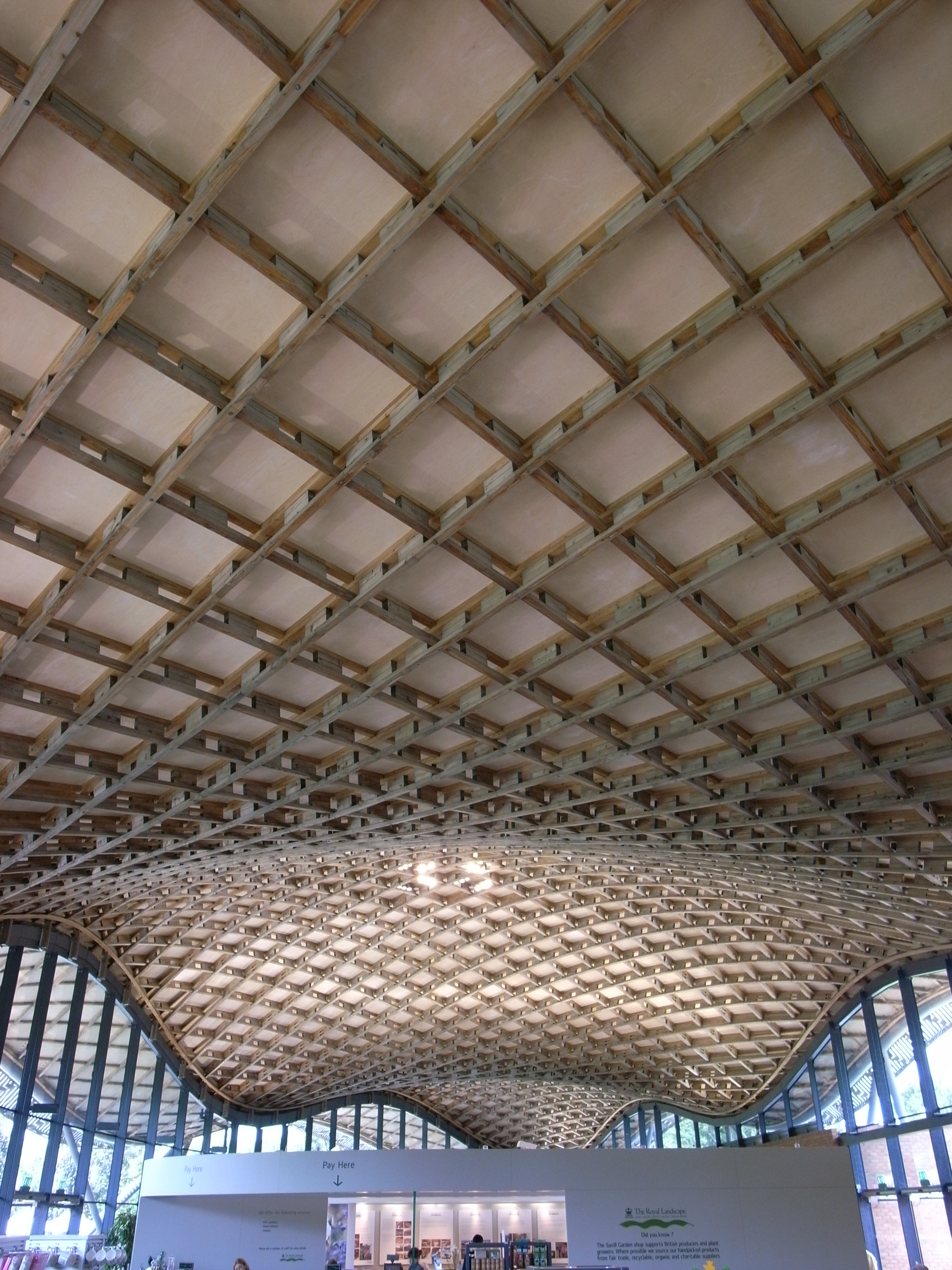
The roof shell of the Savill Building is made of interlocking larch laths.

Atrium - Helmsley Cancer Center 2023, Jerusalem

== In culture ==
The Roman architect Vitruvius conjectured in his De architectura that the Latin name for timber from the tree, larigna, came from the town of Larignum, where Julius Caesar, besieging the town, supposedly discovered the larch. More recently, the Monty Python comedy troupe filmed a sketch with three schoolboys shown slides of the larch and asked which trees they were able to identify.

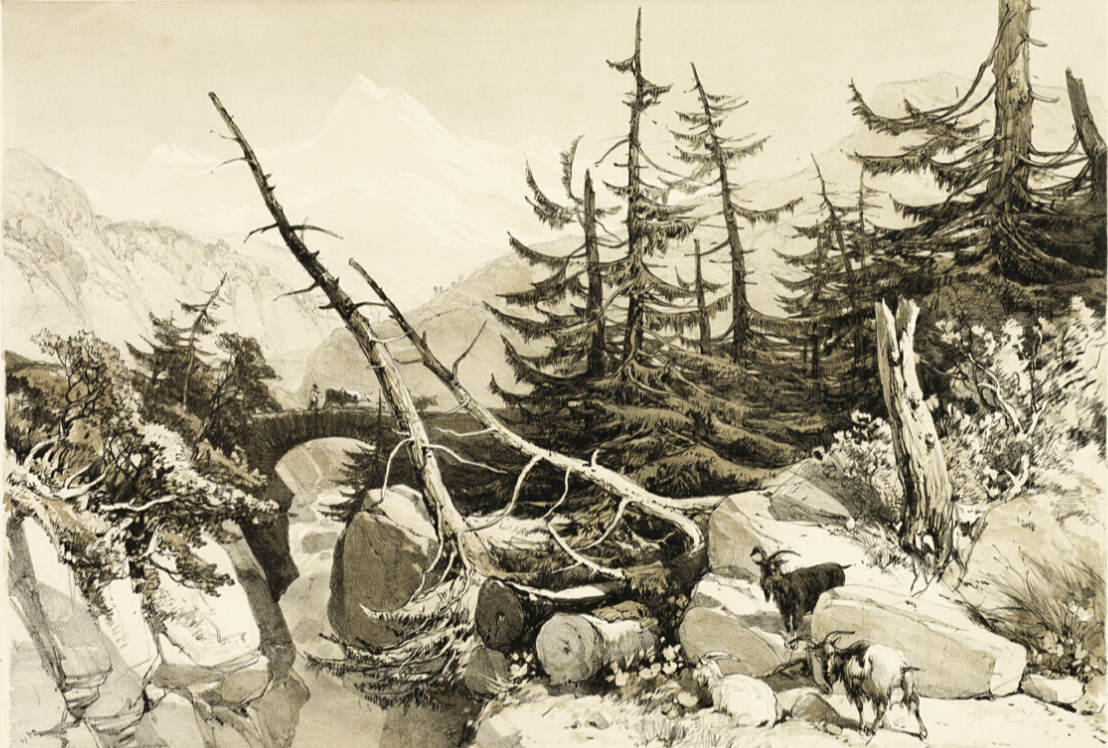
Larch, from The Park and the Forest, James Duffield Harding, 1841

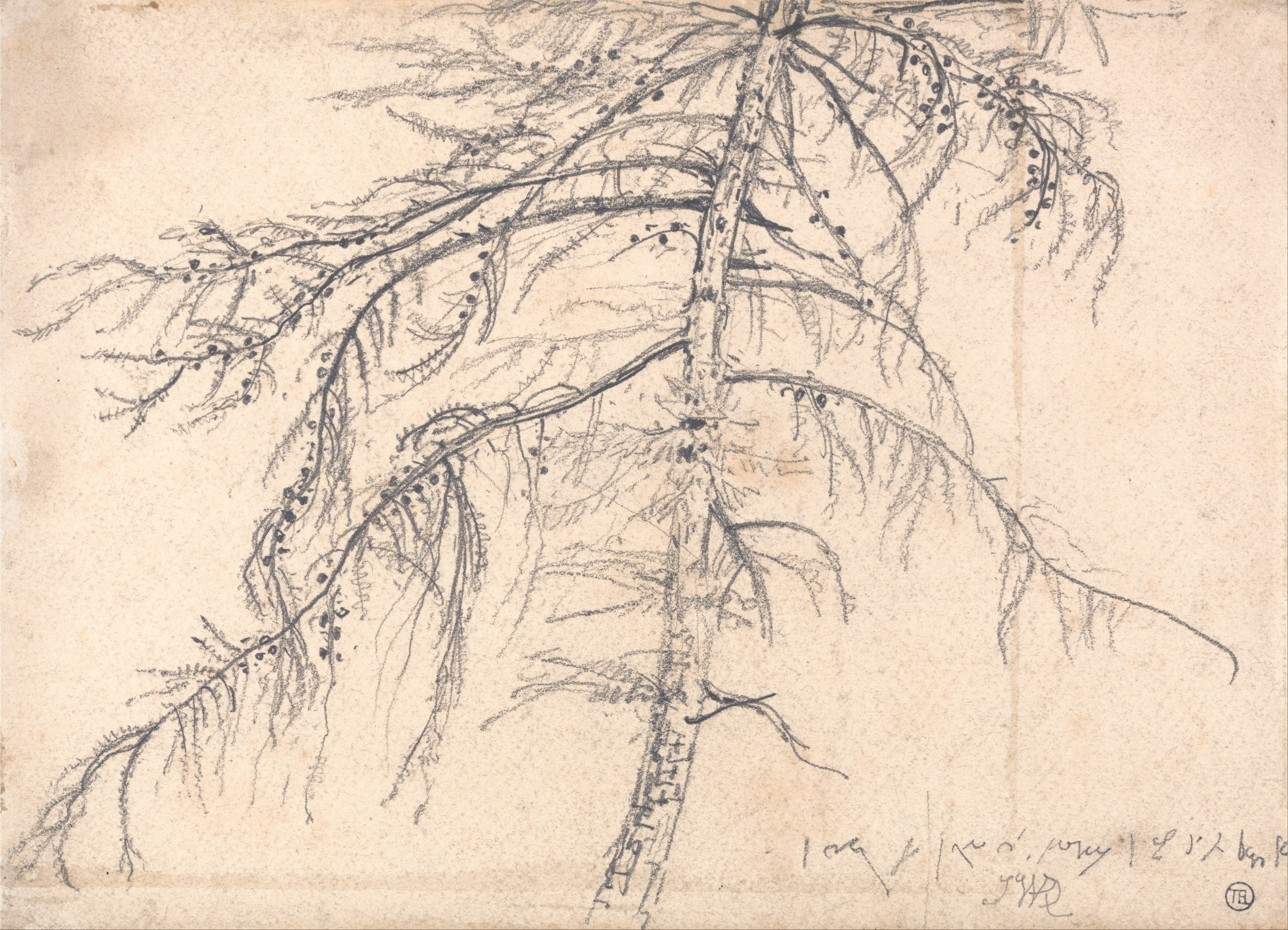
Larch tree pencil drawing,
James Ward, before 1859

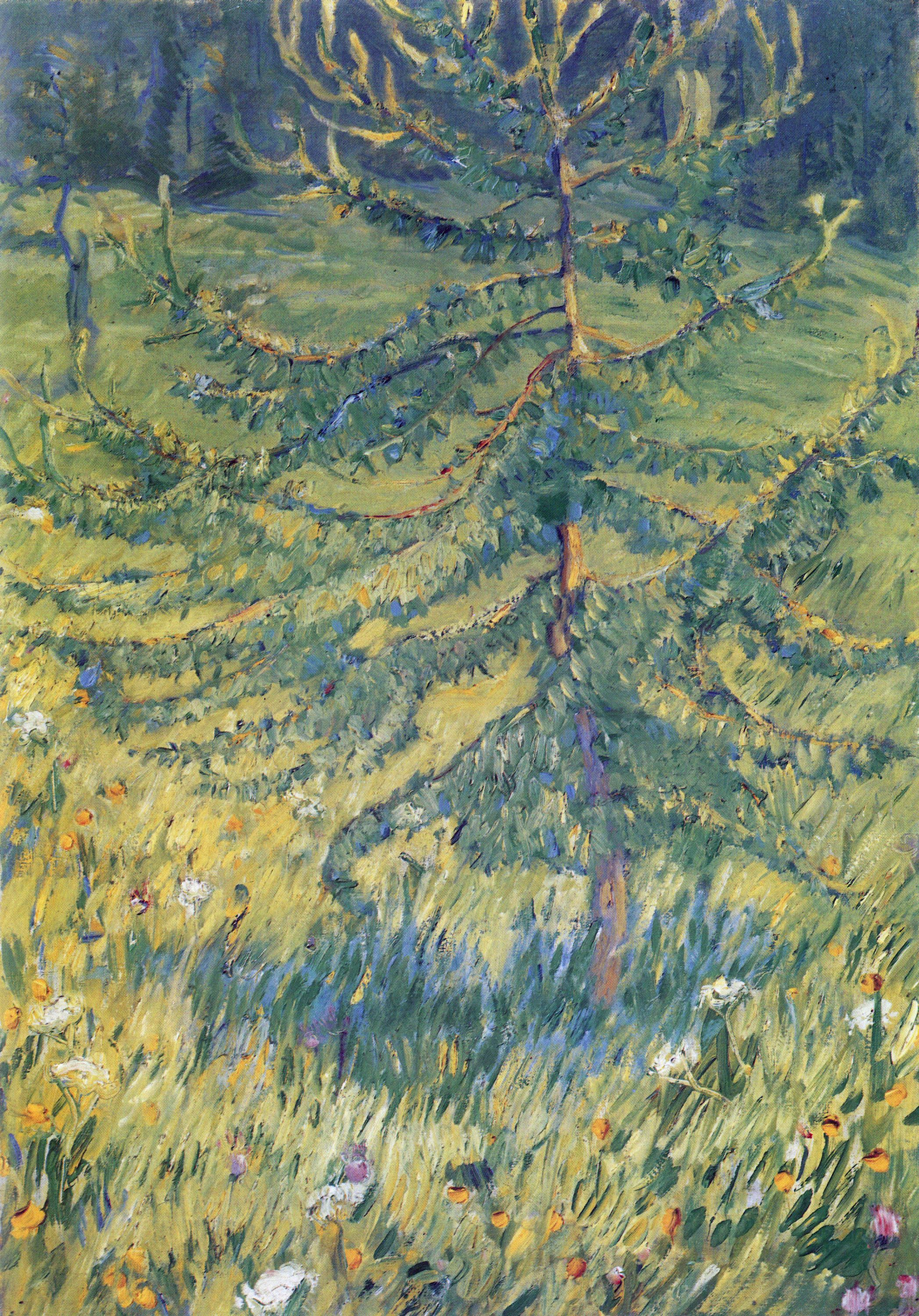
Larch sapling,
Franz Marc, 1908

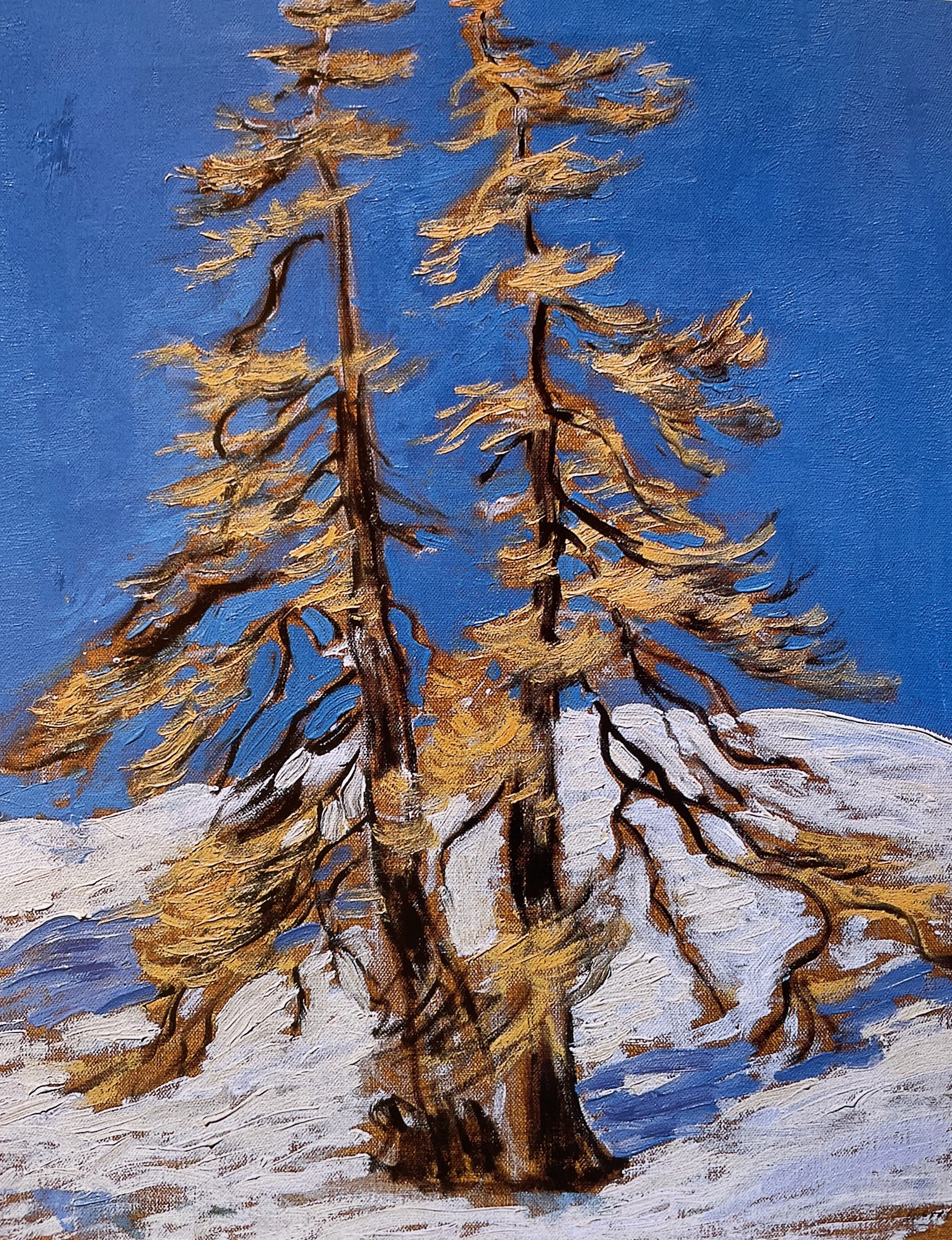
Larch in first snow,
Peter Robert Berry, 1914

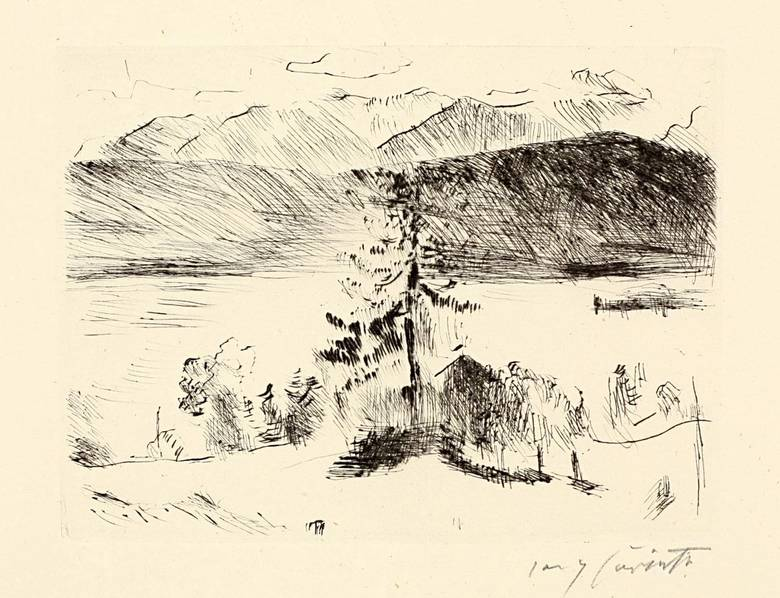
Larch by forest lake,
Lovis Corinth, 1923

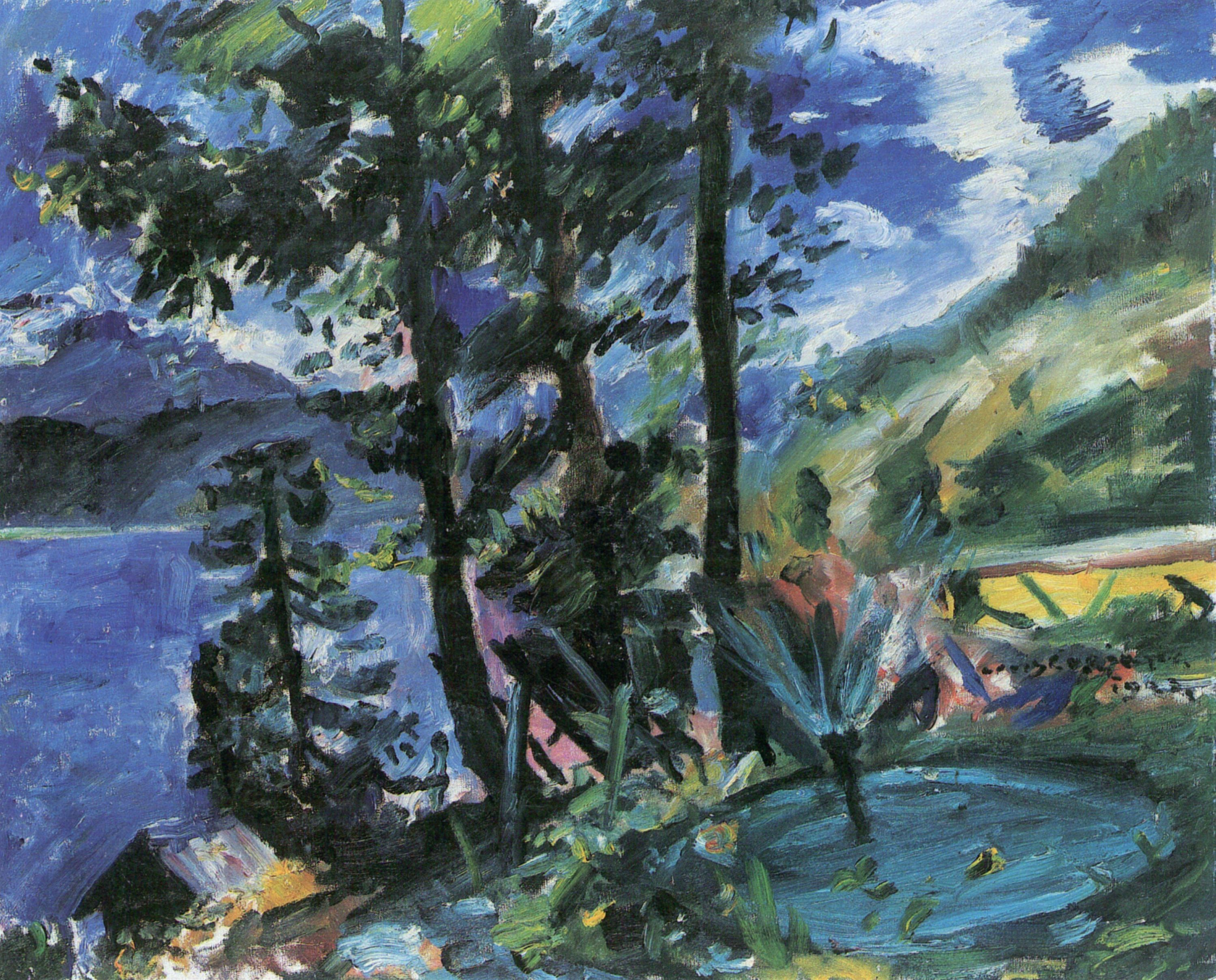
Walchensee with fountain,
Lovis Corinth, 1923

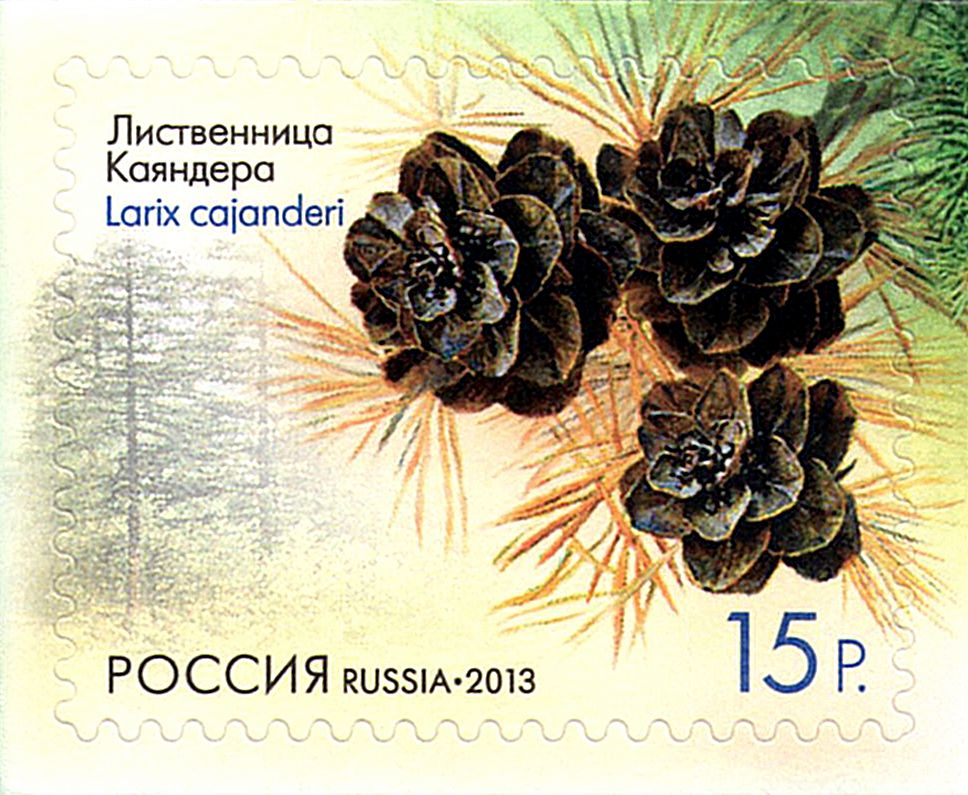
Russian 15 rouble stamp, 2013,
Larix cajanderi
