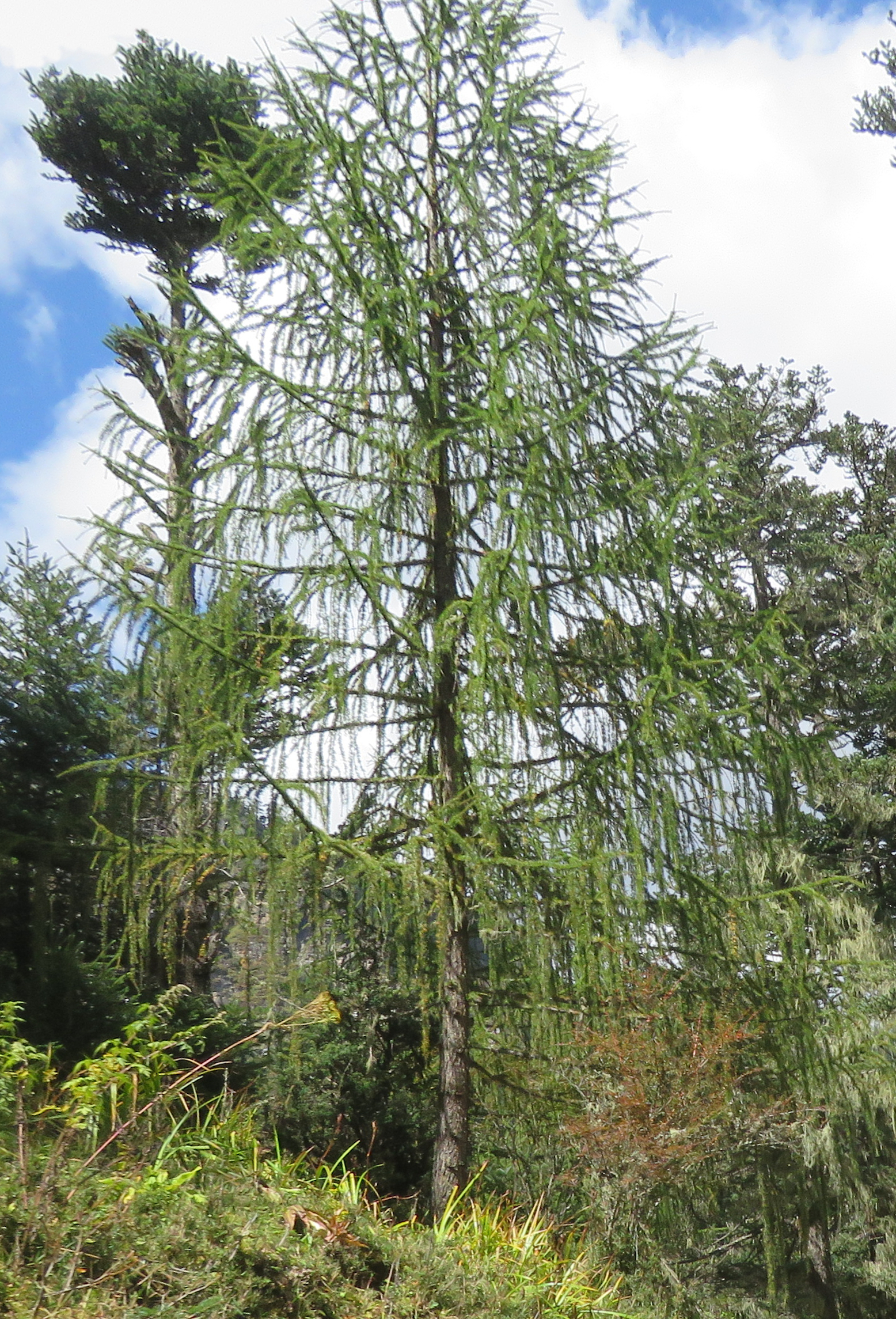
- Larix griffithii between Chelela and Paro, Bhutan

Conservation status
- Least Concern (IUCN 3.1)

Scientific classification
- Kingdom: Plantae
- Clade: Tracheophytes
- Clade: Gymnospermae
- Division: Pinophyta
- Class: Pinopsida
- Order: Pinales
- Family: Pinaceae
- Genus: Larix
- Species: L. griffithii

Binomial name
- Larix griffithii Hook.f.

Synonyms
- Pinus griffithii (Hook.f.) Parl.

= Larix griffithii =

Sikkim larch

Species of conifer

Larix griffithii, the Sikkim larch, is a species of larch, native to the eastern Himalaya in easternmost Nepal, India (Sikkim, Arunachal Pradesh), western Bhutan, and (in some interpretations) southwestern China (Xizang, Yunnan). It grows at 1,800–4,100 metres (5,900–13,500 ft) in altitude.

It is sometimes called the Himalayan larch, not to be confused with Larix potaninii var. himalaica, which is generally known as the 'Langtang larch'.

== Description ==
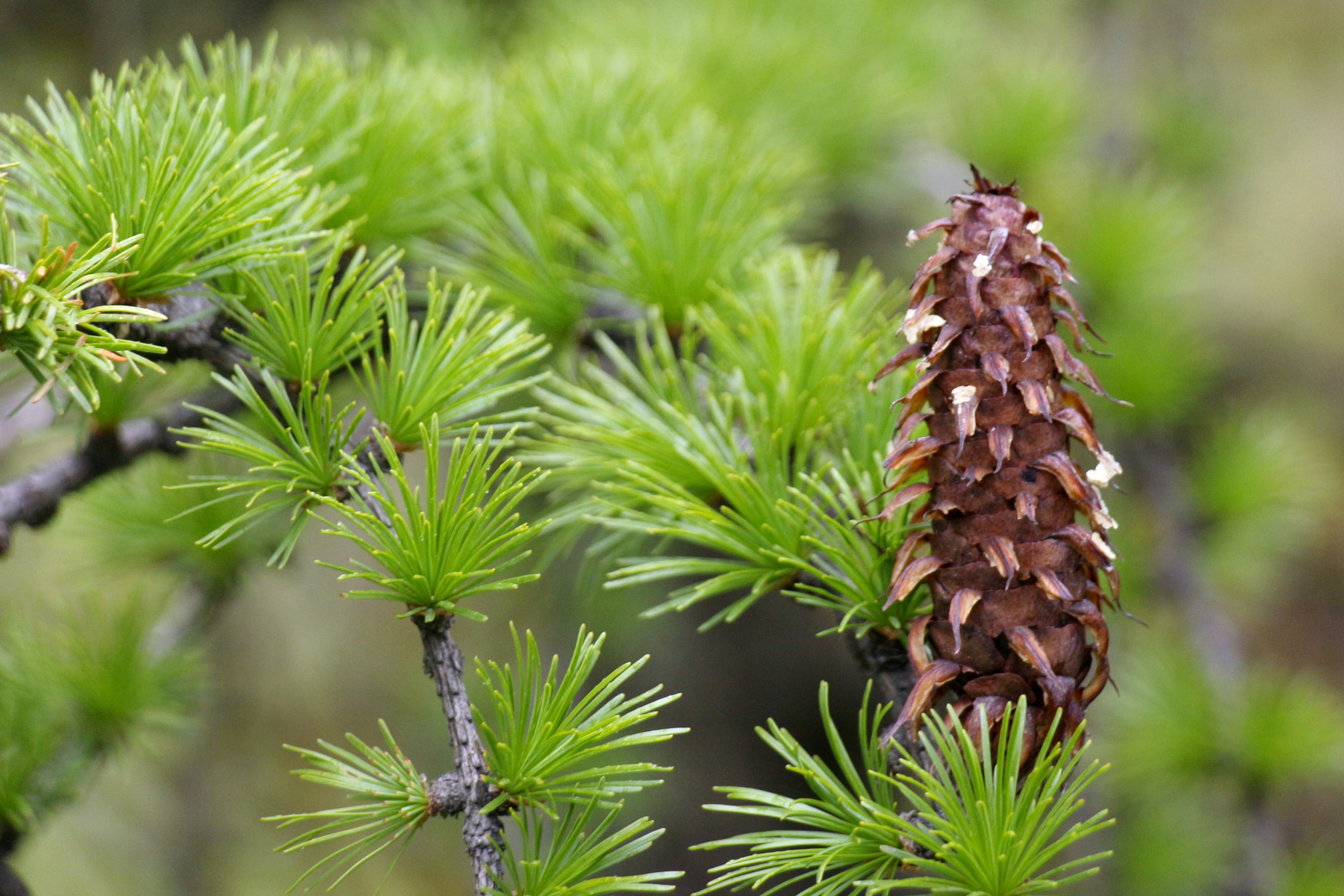
Larix griffithii female cone, Sikkim

It is a medium-sized deciduous coniferous tree reaching 20–25 m (66–82 ft) tall, with a trunk up to 0.8 m (2 ft 7 in) in diameter. The crown is slender conic; the main branches are level to upswept, the side branchlets pendulous from them. The shoots are dimorphic, with growth divided into long shoots (typically 10–50 cm (4–20 in) long) and bearing several buds, and short shoots only 1–2 mm (0.039–0.079 in) long with only a single bud. The leaves are needle-like, light glaucous green, 2–4 cm (1–2 in) long; they turn bright yellow to orange before they fall in the autumn, leaving the pale yellow-brown shoots bare until the next spring.

The cones are erect, ovoid-conic, 4–7.5 cm (2–3 in) long, with 50-100 seed scales, each seed scale with a long exserted and reflexed basal bract; they are dark purple when immature, turning dark brown and opening to release the seeds when mature, 5–7 months after pollination. The old cones commonly remain on the tree for many years, turning dull grey-black.

== Taxonomy ==
Two varieties are accepted by Kew's Plants of the World Online; these are regarded as separate species by many other authors, including the Flora of China:

- Larix griffithii var. griffithii. Himalaya in the far east of Nepal, India, and Bhutan.
- Larix griffithii var. speciosa (W.C.Cheng & Y.W.Law) Farjon. Disjunct, in Yunnan. Treated as Larix speciosa W.C.Cheng & Y.W.Law by the Flora of China.

Synonyms of L. griffithii include Abies griffithiana J. D. Hooker ex Lindley & Gordon and Larix griffithiana hort. ex Carrière.

Trees to the northeast of the range in eastern Bhutan and Xizang have been separated as Larix kongboensis (Mill 1999); they differ in smaller cones 3–5 cm (1–2 in) long. This species has been accepted by the Flora of China but not by POWO.
