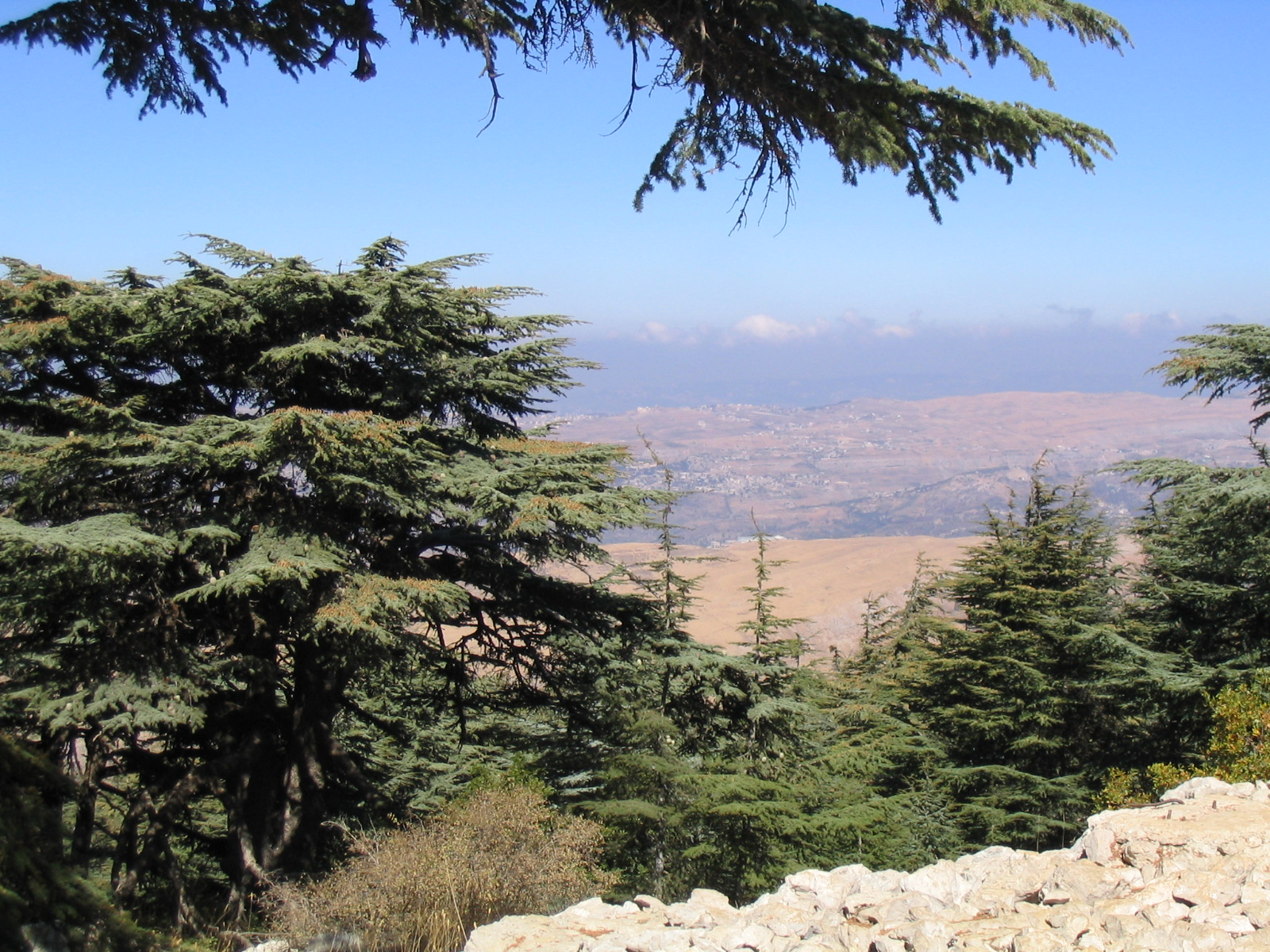
- Lebanon cedar in Al Shouf Cedar Nature Reserve in Barouk, Lebanon

Scientific classification
- Kingdom: Plantae
- Clade: Tracheophytes
- Clade: Gymnosperms
- Division: Pinophyta
- Class: Pinopsida
- Order: Pinales
- Family: Pinaceae
- Subfamily: Abietoideae
- Genus: Cedrus; Trew

Type species
- Pinus cedrus L., = Cedrus libani A.Rich.

Species (Note: See text for discussion of species-level taxonomy.)
- Cedrus atlantica (Endl.) G.Manetti ex Carrière; Cedrus deodara (Roxb. ex D.Don) G.Don; Cedrus libani A.Rich.

= Cedrus =

Cedar Temporal range: Albian–Recent

Genus of coniferous trees

Cedrus is a small genus in the pine family, Pinaceae (subfamily Abietoideae), consisting of 1-3 species of coniferous trees known in English as cedars. They are native to the mountains of the western Himalayas and the Mediterranean region at high altitudes. The trees grow tall with a cylindrical trunk and a wide leafy crown. The cones are erect; the leaves grow in tufts of 15–45 needle leaves, which can be bright green or blue-green with a waxy coat. When the cones are mature, they disintegrate to release the seeds, which are winged. Both pollen and seeds are wind-dispersed.

Cedars are often grown as bonsai. Cedar wood and cedarwood oil are naturally repellent to moths, and have an attractive, long-persistent scent.

== Etymology ==
The English name derives from Old English ceder, from Latin cedrus, used for the genus. This in turn is derived from Greek κέδρος kédros, meaning cedar or juniper. Species of both trees are native to the area where Greek language and culture originated, though as the word kédros does not seem to be derived from any of the languages of the Middle East, it has been suggested the word may originally have applied to Greek species of juniper and was later adopted for species now classified in the genus Cedrus because of their aromatic woods. The name was similarly applied to citron: the word citrus is derived from the same root. As a loan word in English, cedar had become fixed to its biblical sense of Cedrus by the time of its first recorded usage in 1000 CE.

== Description ==
=== Habit ===
Cedars are tall resinous trees growing to 30–40 metres (100–130 ft) tall, rarely to 65 m (213 ft), with a cylindrical trunk and a narrow to wide crown, conical when young but often becoming irregular with age. In some individuals, several main branches may eventually rival the main trunk in size. The bark is pale grey-brown and smooth in young trees, dark grey-brown to blackish and splitting into ridges and scales on older trees.

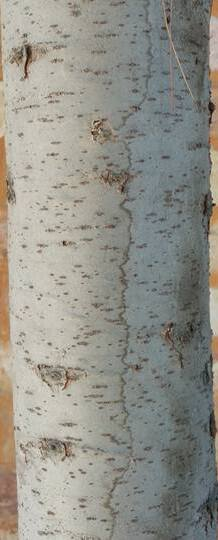
Bark on a young deodar

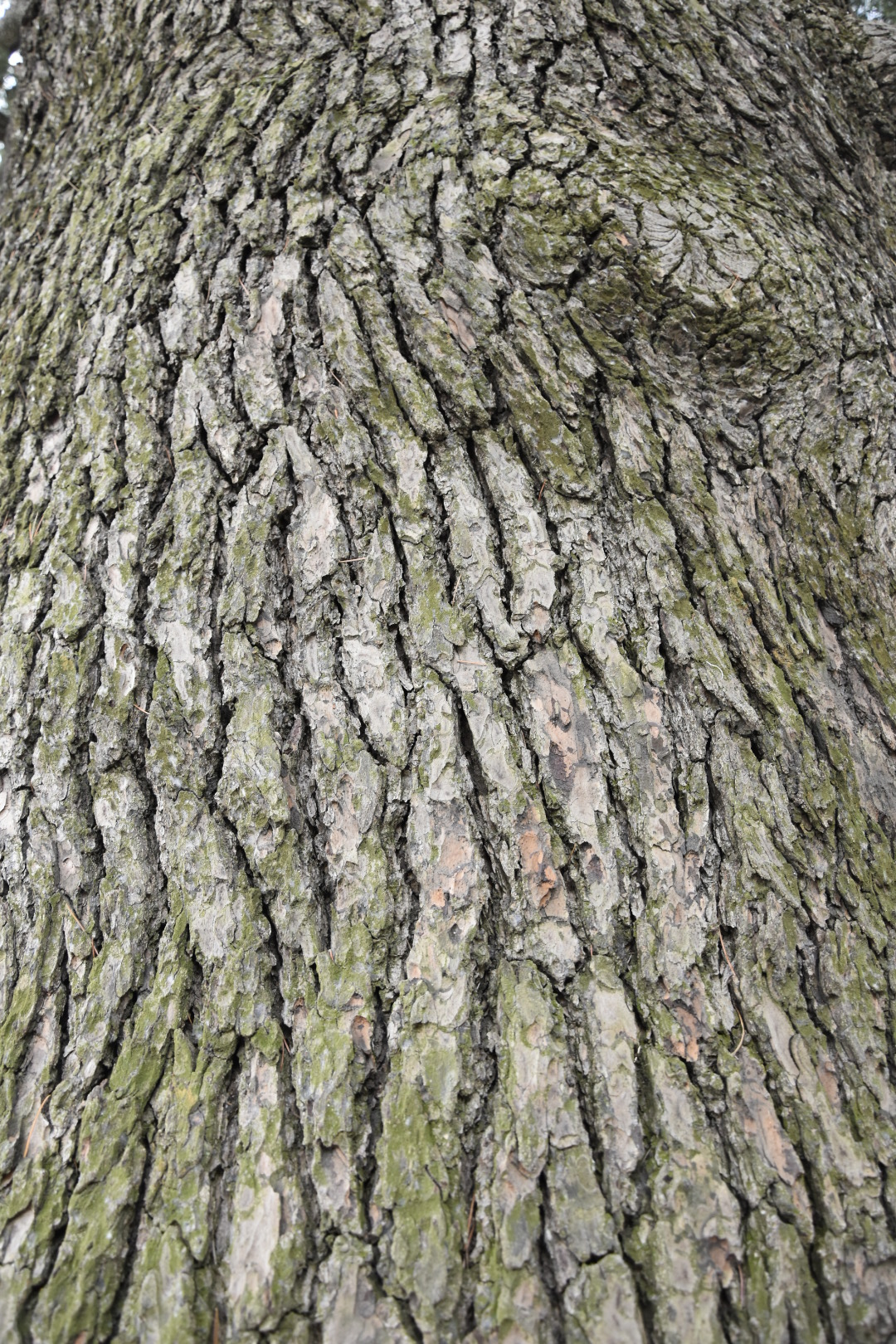
Bark on a mature Lebanon cedar

=== Foliage ===
The shoots are dimorphic, made up of long thin leading shoots from terminal buds, each one accompanied by multiple short lateral shoots. The leaves are evergreen and needle-like, 8–60 millimetres (1/4–2 1/4 in) long, arranged in an open spiral phyllotaxis on long shoots and in dense spiral clusters of 15–45 together on short shoots; they vary from bright grass-green to dark green to strongly glaucous pale blue-green, depending on the thickness of the white wax layer which protects the leaves from drying out.

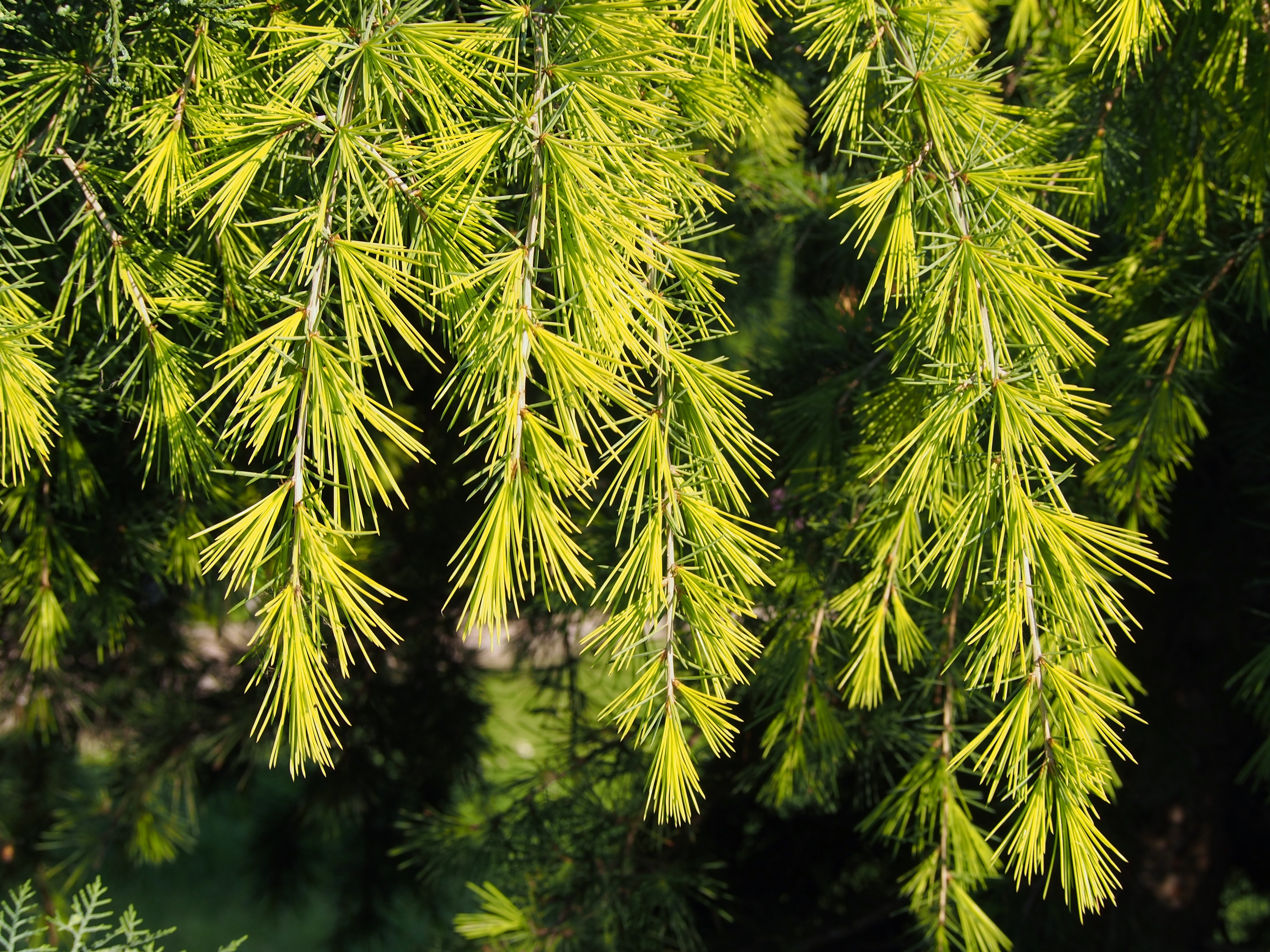
Deodar foliage in spring

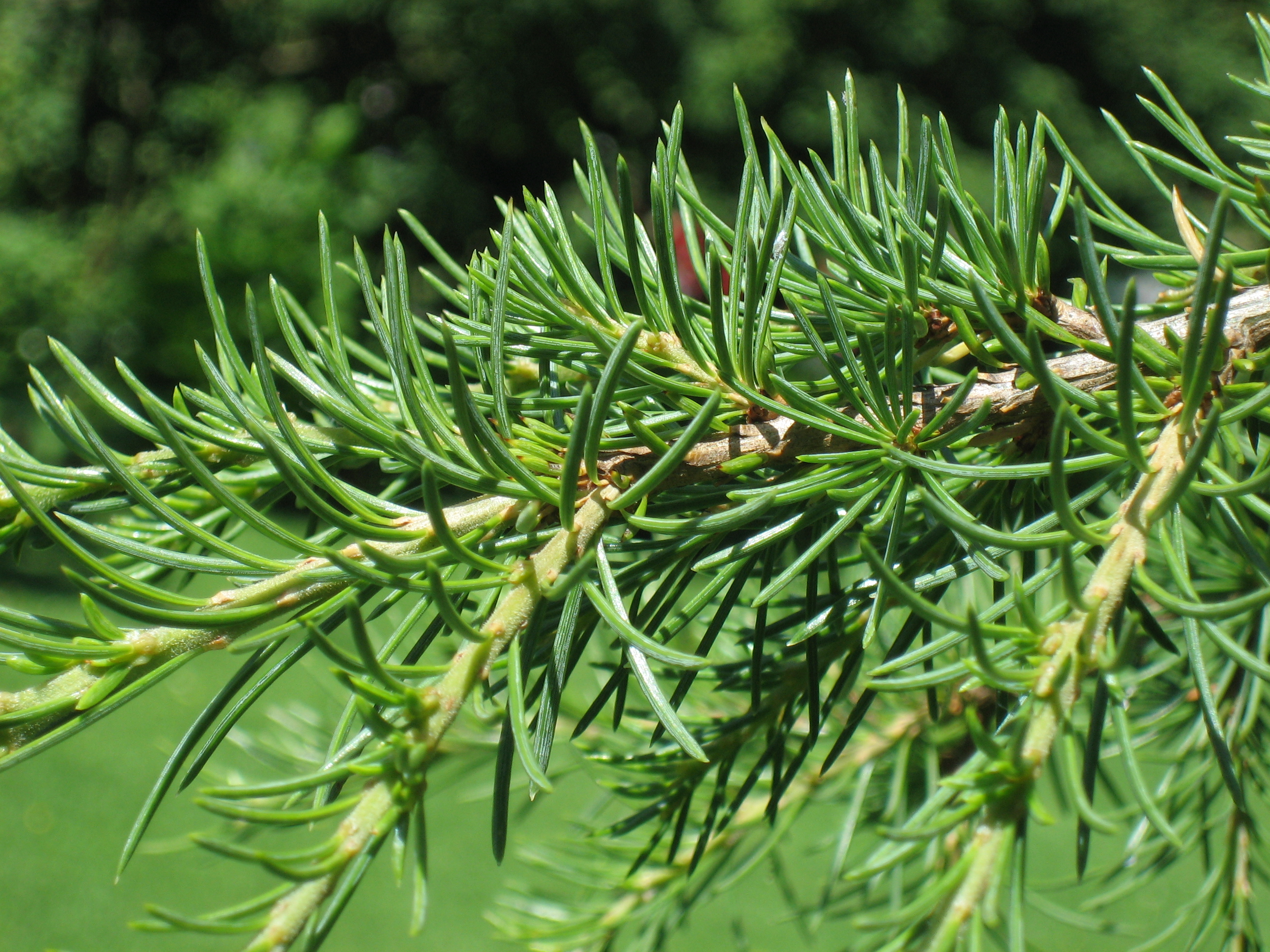
Foliage of Lebanon cedar, showing long shoots with widely spaced needles, and short shoots with densely packed needles

=== Cones ===
Cedars are monoecious, with separate male and female cones on the same tree. The seed cones are barrel-shaped, 6–12 centimetres (2 1/4–4 3/4 in) long and 3–8 cm broad, green maturing grey-brown, and, as in Abies, disintegrate at maturity to release the winged seeds. The seeds are 10–15 mm (3/8–5/8 in) long, with a 20–30 mm wing; as in Abies, the seeds have two or three resin blisters, containing an unpleasant-tasting resin, thought to be a defence against squirrel predation. Cone maturation takes one year, with pollination in autumn and the seeds maturing at the same time a year later. The pollen cones are slender ovoid, 3–8 cm long, produced in late summer, and shed pollen in autumn.

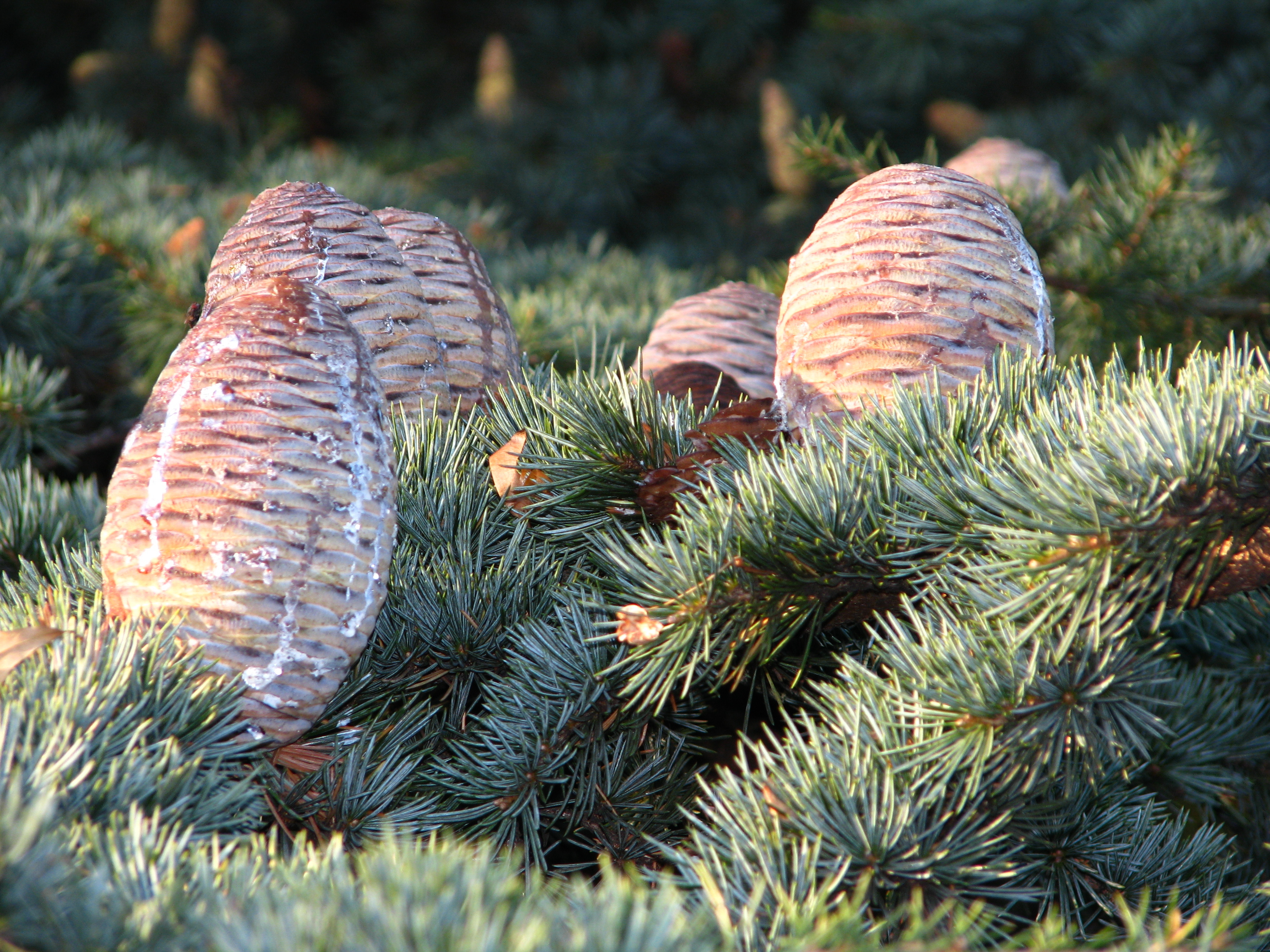
Female (seed) cones of Lebanon cedar

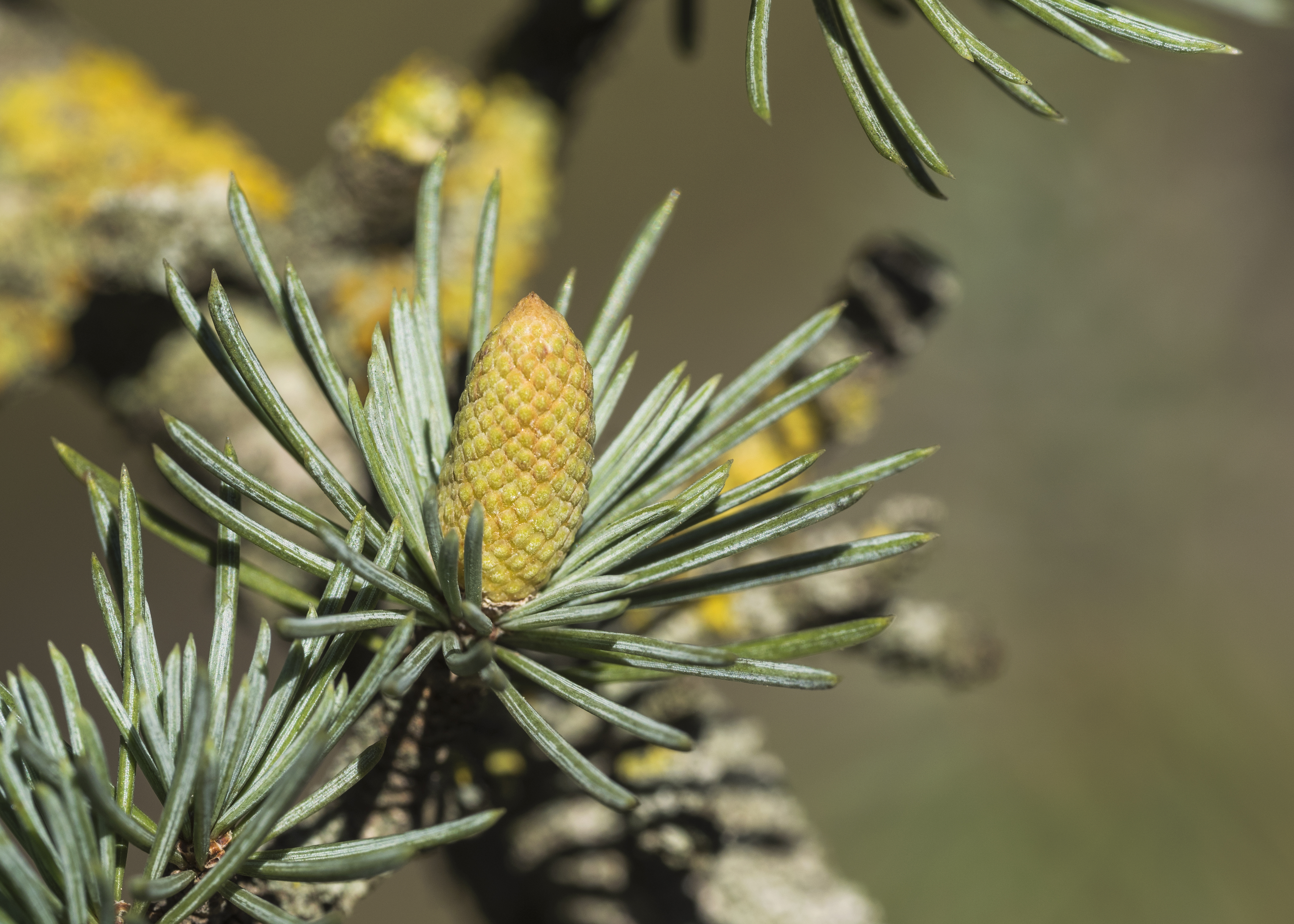
Immature male (pollen) cone of Lebanon cedar

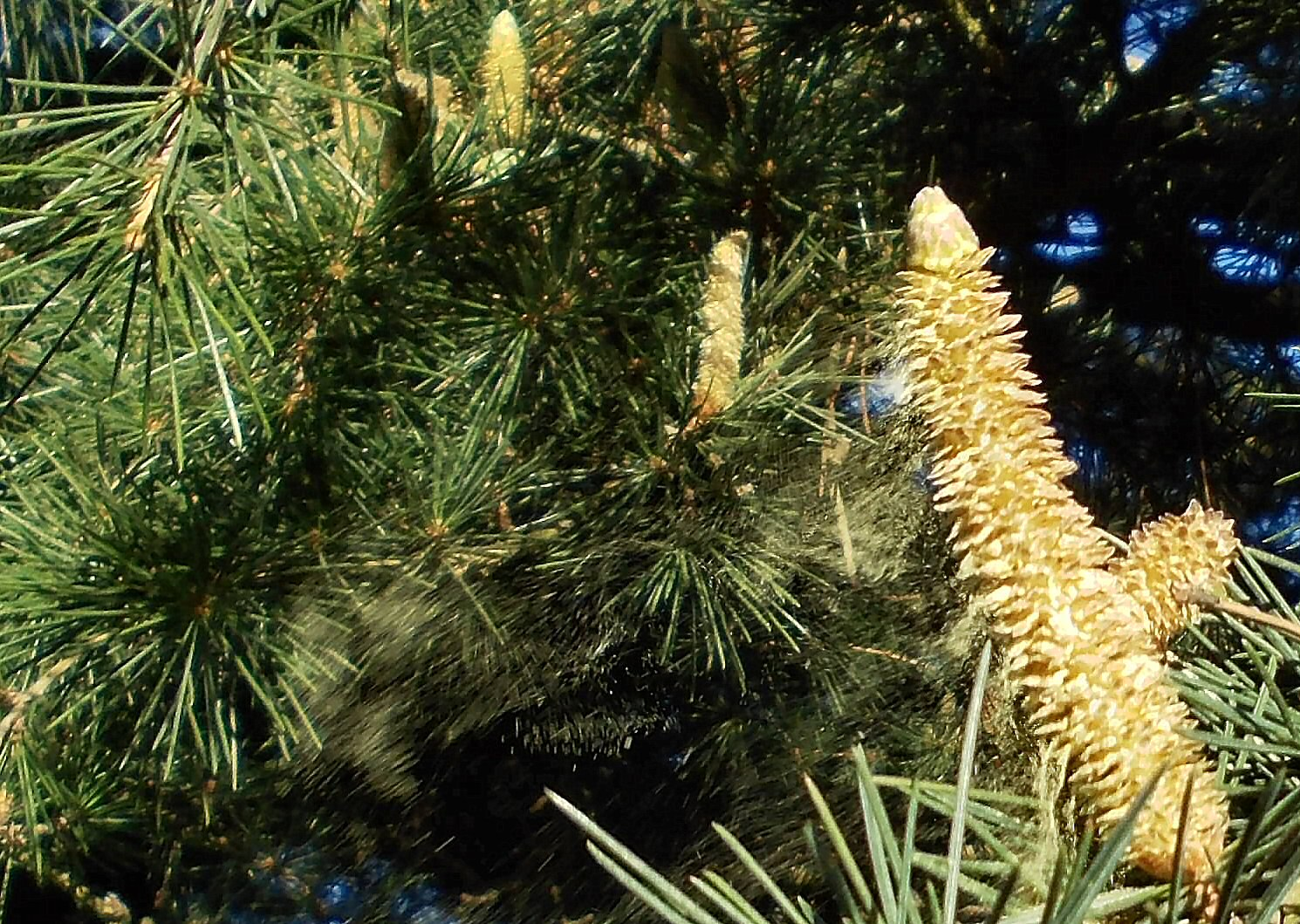
Pollen cone of deodar cedar, shedding pollen in the wind

== Evolution ==
=== Fossil history ===
The oldest fossil of Cedrus is Cedrus penzhinaensis known from fossil wood found in Early Cretaceous (Albian) sediments of Kamchatka, Russia. An Early Miocene species, Cedrus anatolica, also from petrified wood and thought to be close to C. atlantica, is known from Turkey.

=== Phylogeny ===
Cedars have a similar cone structure to firs (Abies) and were traditionally thought to be most closely related to them, but genetic evidence indicates that they are instead sister to all other lineages in the subfamily Abietoideae.

- Pinaceae
  - Abietoideae (firs and allies)
    - Cedreae
      Cedrus
    - - Pseudolariceae
        - Pseudolarix (golden larches)
        - - Nothotsuga
          - Tsuga (hemlocks)
      - Abieteae
        - Keteleeria
        - Abies (firs)
  - Pinoideae (pines, larches, etc)

=== Taxonomy and internal phylogeny ===
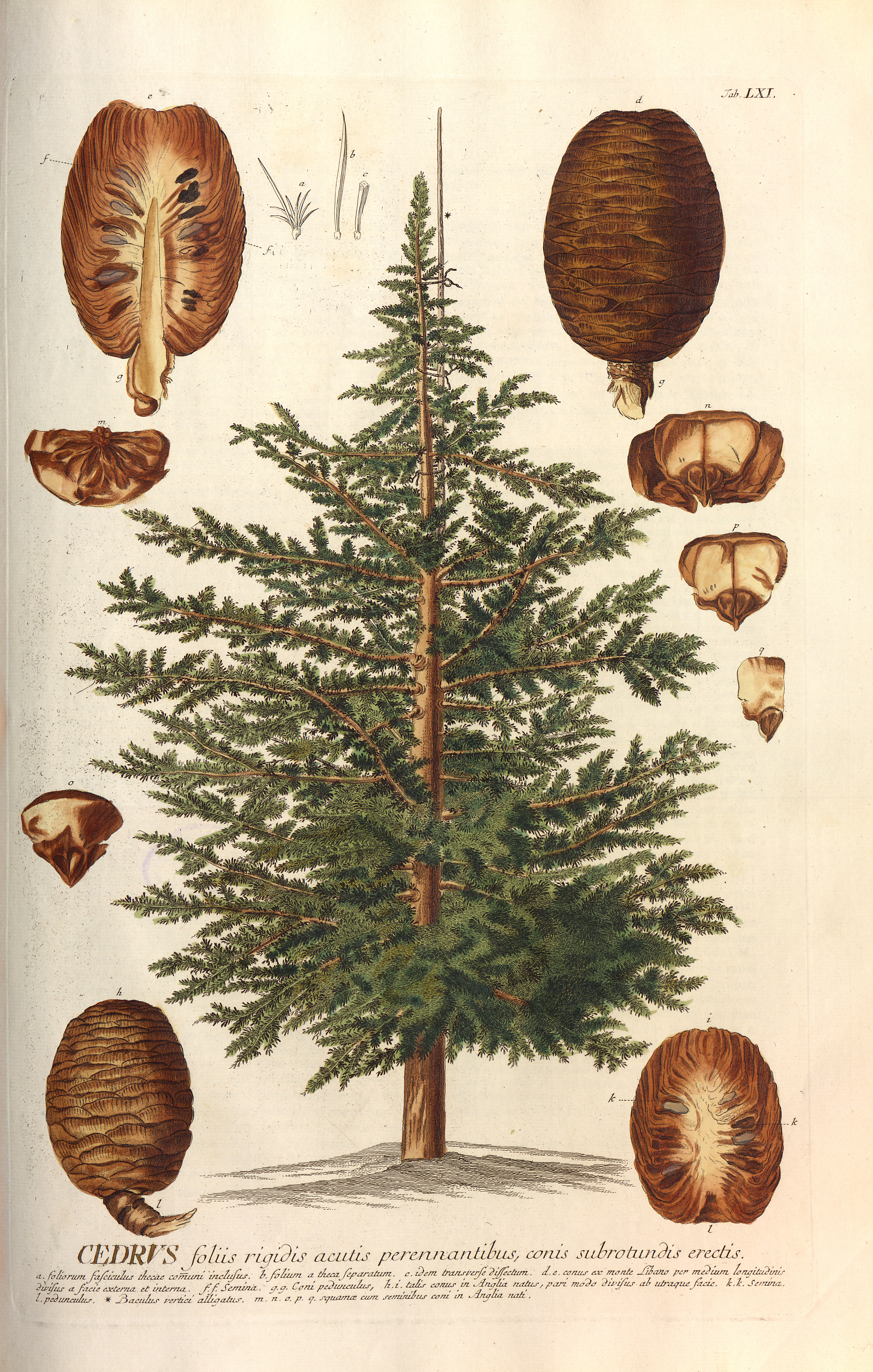
Plate "CEDRUS foliis rigidis acutis perennantibus, conis subrotundis erectis" (Cedar with sharp rigid perennial leaves, subrotund erect cones) from Christoph Jacob Trew's description of the genus in his 1757 Plantae Selectae Quarum Imagines

The genus Cedrus was described by the German botanist Christoph Jacob Trew in his Plantae Selectae Quarum Imagines in 1757. The Cedrus taxa are assigned according to taxonomic opinion to between one and four species. The deodar cedar is sister to the Mediterranean cedars. The Cyprus cedar for example is variously considered to be a variety or subspecies of Cedrus libani, or a species C. brevifolia in its own right; some evidence from allozymes suggests it may even be embedded within the range of variation in the Turkish cedar. Divergence ages are marked on the cladogram.

- Cedrus 55 mya
  - Cedrus deodara
    Deodar cedar, western Himalaya
  - Mediterranean cedars 19 mya
    - Cedrus atlantica
      Atlas cedar, Atlas Mountains in Morocco and Algeria
    - Cedrus libani 6.5 mya
      - var libani Lebanon cedar, mountains in Lebanon and Syria
      - - var stenocoma Turkish cedar, Turkey
        - var brevifolia Cyprus cedar, Troodos Mountains in Cyprus

The species cannot hybridise in nature due to their geographical separation, but when brought together in cultivation, they do so freely. However, because cedars (particularly between the Mediterranean taxa) are so similar to each other, hybrids are notoriously difficult to detect and identify. Hybrids between Atlas and Deodar cedars have been deliberately bred by the Tesi nursery in northern Italy since the 1980s, and were named in 2021 as the cultivar group Cedrus Tesi Group.

== Distribution and ecology ==
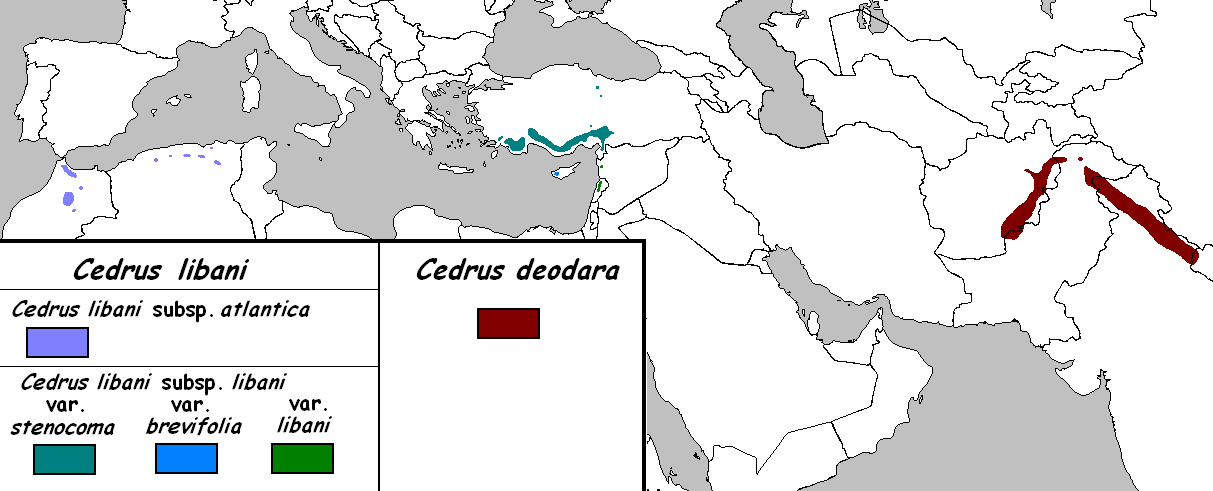
World distribution of all Cedrus species

Cedars are adapted to mountainous climates; in the Mediterranean, they receive winter precipitation, mainly as snow, and summer drought, while in the western Himalaya, they receive primarily summer monsoon rainfall and occasional winter snowfall. They are native to the mountains of the western Himalayas and the Mediterranean region, occurring at altitudes of 1,500–3,200 m (4,900–10,500 ft) in the Himalayas and 1,000–2,200 m (3,300–7,200 ft) in the Mediterranean. In Lebanon, a small number of cedars of Lebanon survive in protected areas including the Cedars of God near the Qadisha Valley, a World Heritage Site.

Fungal diseases of cedars include canker; collar, crown, and root rot; needle blight; Gymnosporangium rusts; and sirococcus blight, caused by Sirococcus tsugae, which kills shoots and branches. Cedar trees are robust but become vulnerable to bark beetles in drought conditions. Other pests include the giant conifer aphid, scale insects, and nematodes such as the pine wilt nematode. Caterpillars of the pine processionary moth sometimes make their nests in cedars.

== Uses ==
Cedars have long been highly valued for their scented, durable, and decay-resistant wood, being in demand for building temples and palaces for over 4,000 years from the period of the Epic of Gilgamesh onwards, the longest record of any conifer in human use. Cultivation of cedars for their wood has an equally long history, with recent genetic and environment studies corroborating local oral mythology and Hittite cuneiform text records that two small geographically isolated populations of Lebanon cedar in northern Anatolia 500 km north of its main native area are of human origin, deliberately planted over 3,200 years ago for cedar wood supply to the nearby capital of the Hittite Empire at Hattusa.

Cedars are popular ornamental trees and are often cultivated in temperate climates where winter temperatures do not fall below −25 °C. The Turkish cedar is slightly hardier, to −30 °C or just below. Extensive mortality of planted specimens can occur in severe winters when temperatures fall lower. Cedars are suitable for training as bonsai in varied styles. Cedar wood and cedarwood oil are naturally repellent to moths.

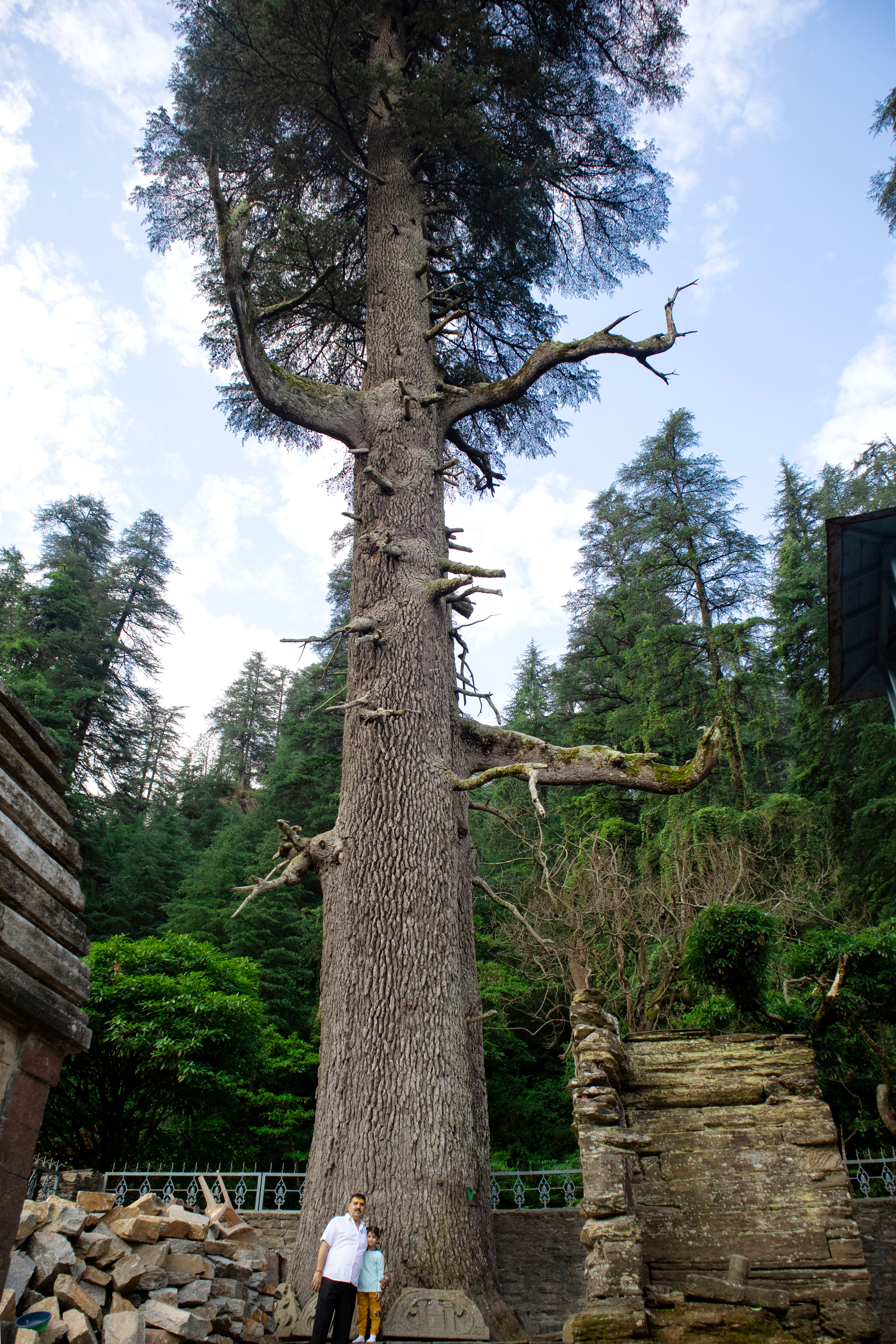
Large deodar cedar in Jageshwar temple at Almora, Uttarakhand in the Himalayas

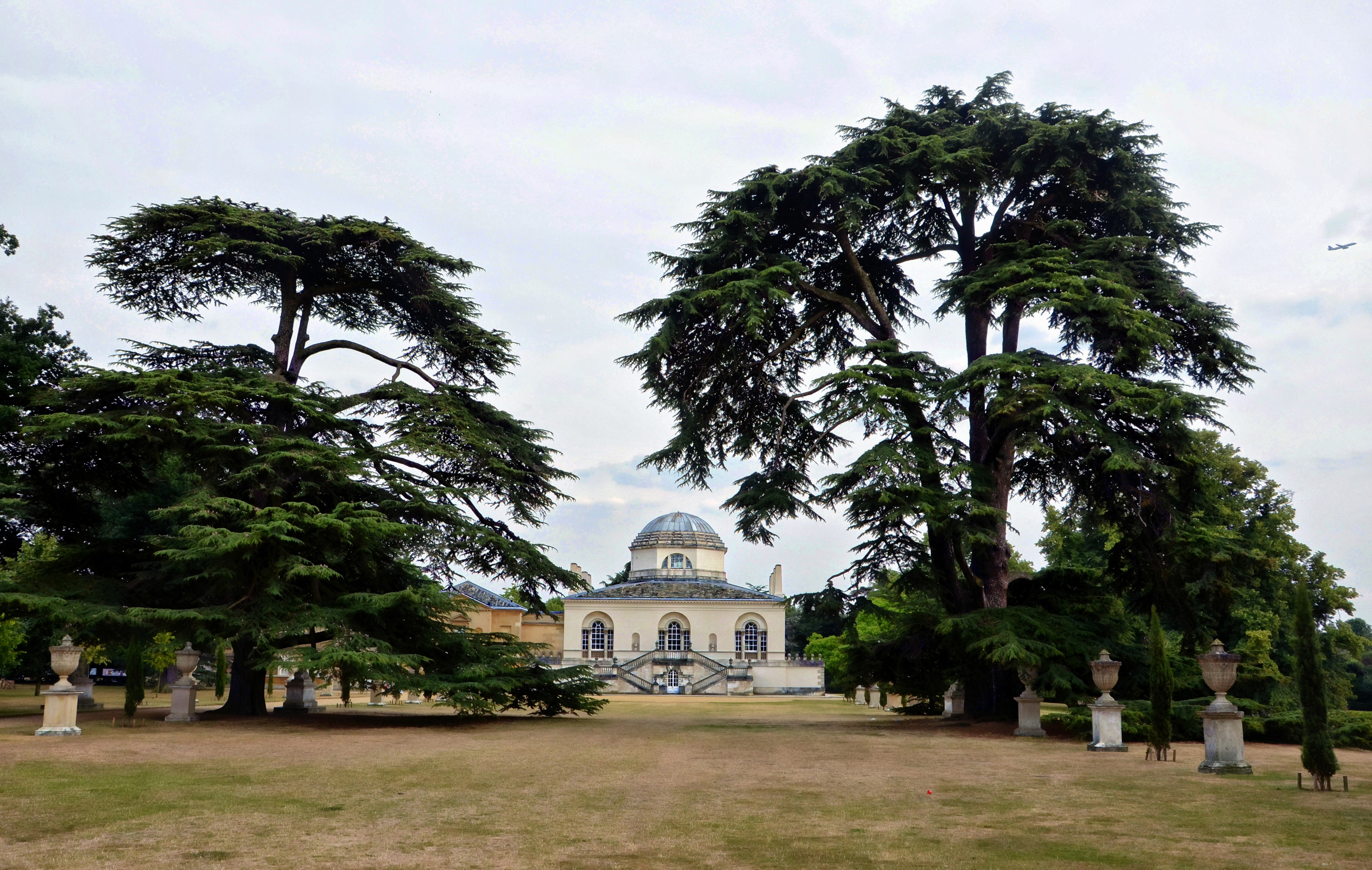
Formally planted ornamental cedars at Chiswick House, London.

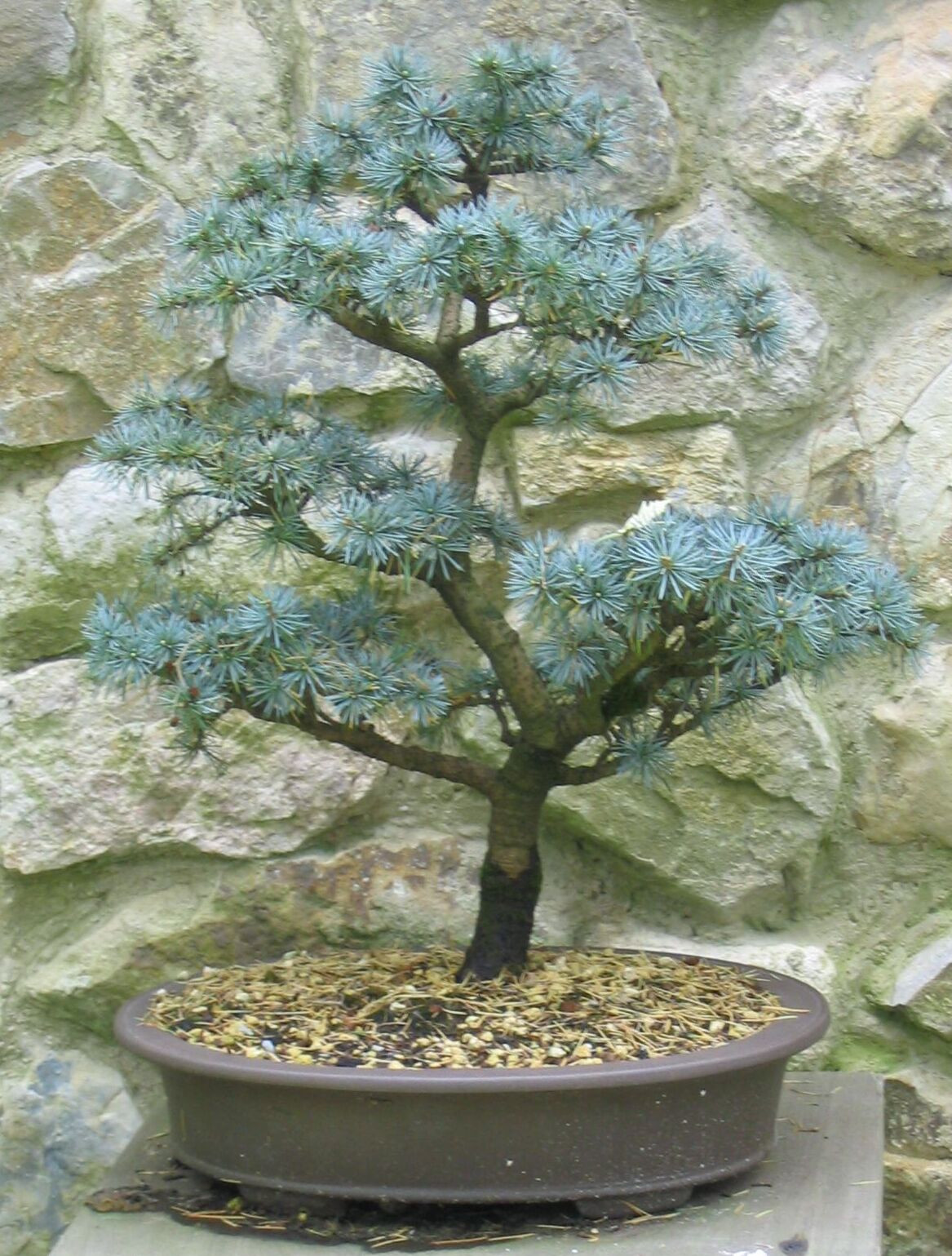
Glaucous Atlas cedar
trained as a bonsai
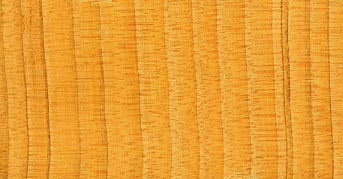
Cedar wood has a strong sweet spicy-resinous scent, and a distinctive colour and grain.

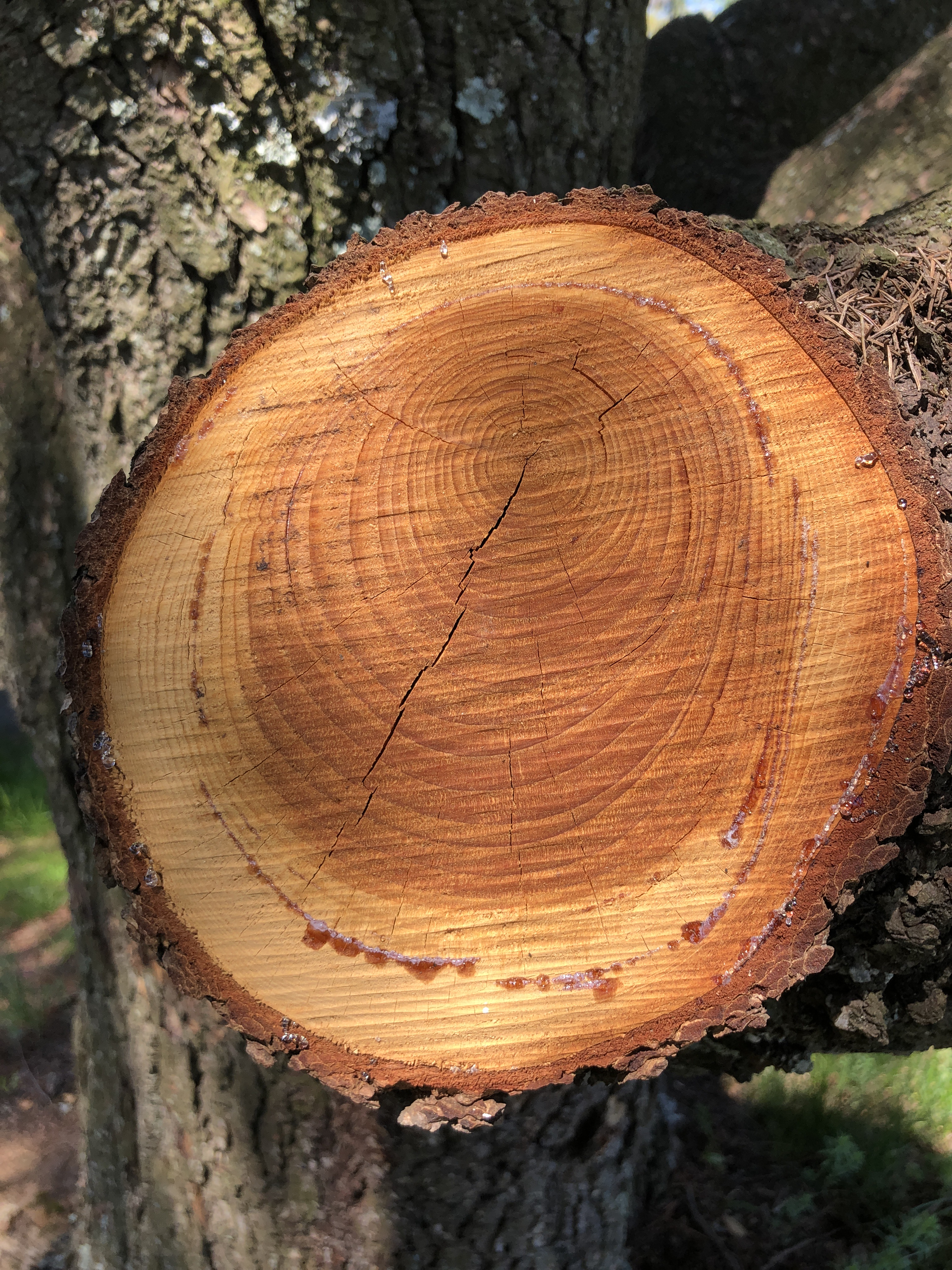
Freshly cut cedar wood has yellowish sapwood and orange-brown heartwood, and exudes strongly scented resin.

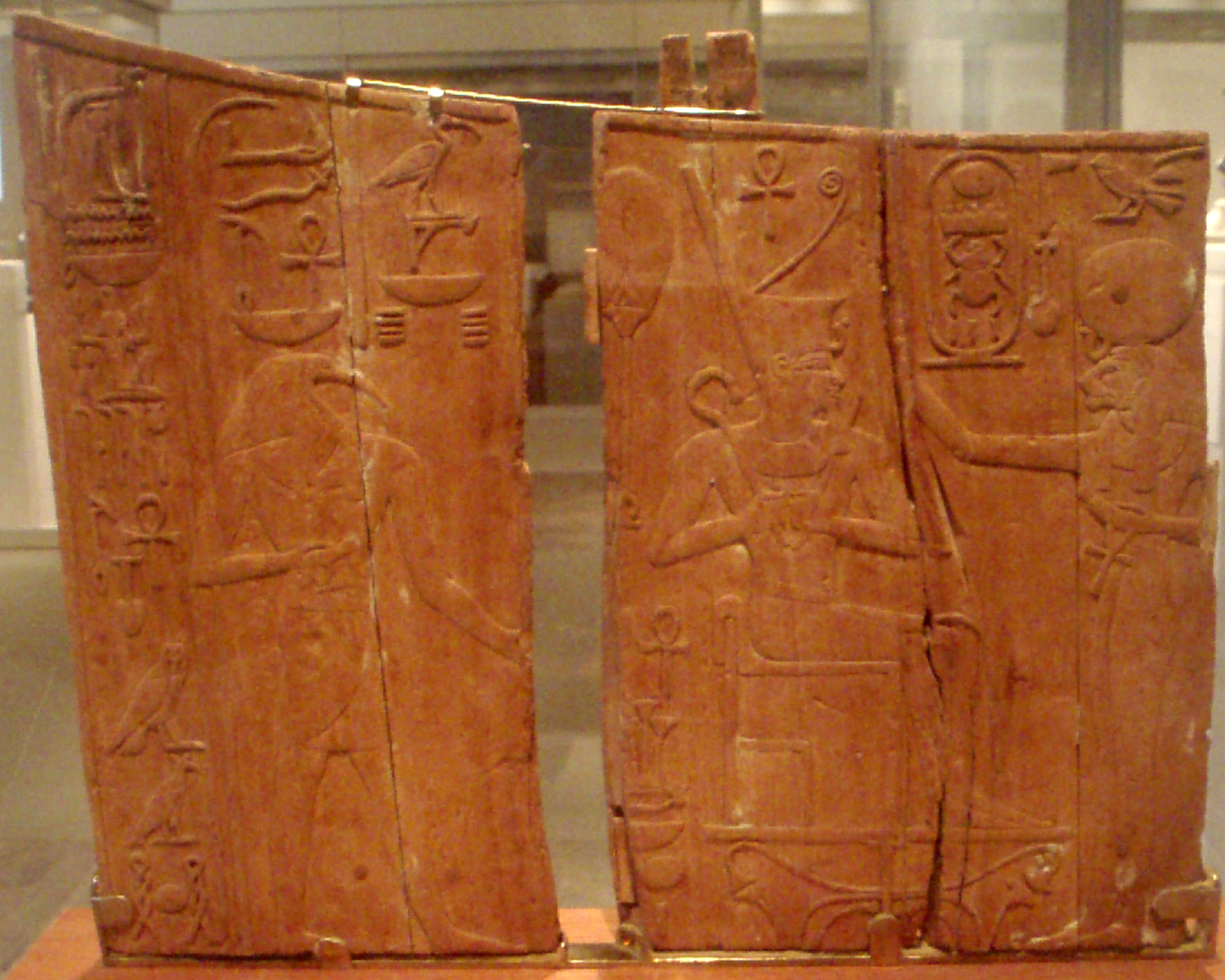
Cedar wood panel from the reign of Thutmose IV, circa 1400-1391 B.C.

The Flag of Lebanon prominently features a Lebanese cedar

== See also ==
- List of plants known as cedar
