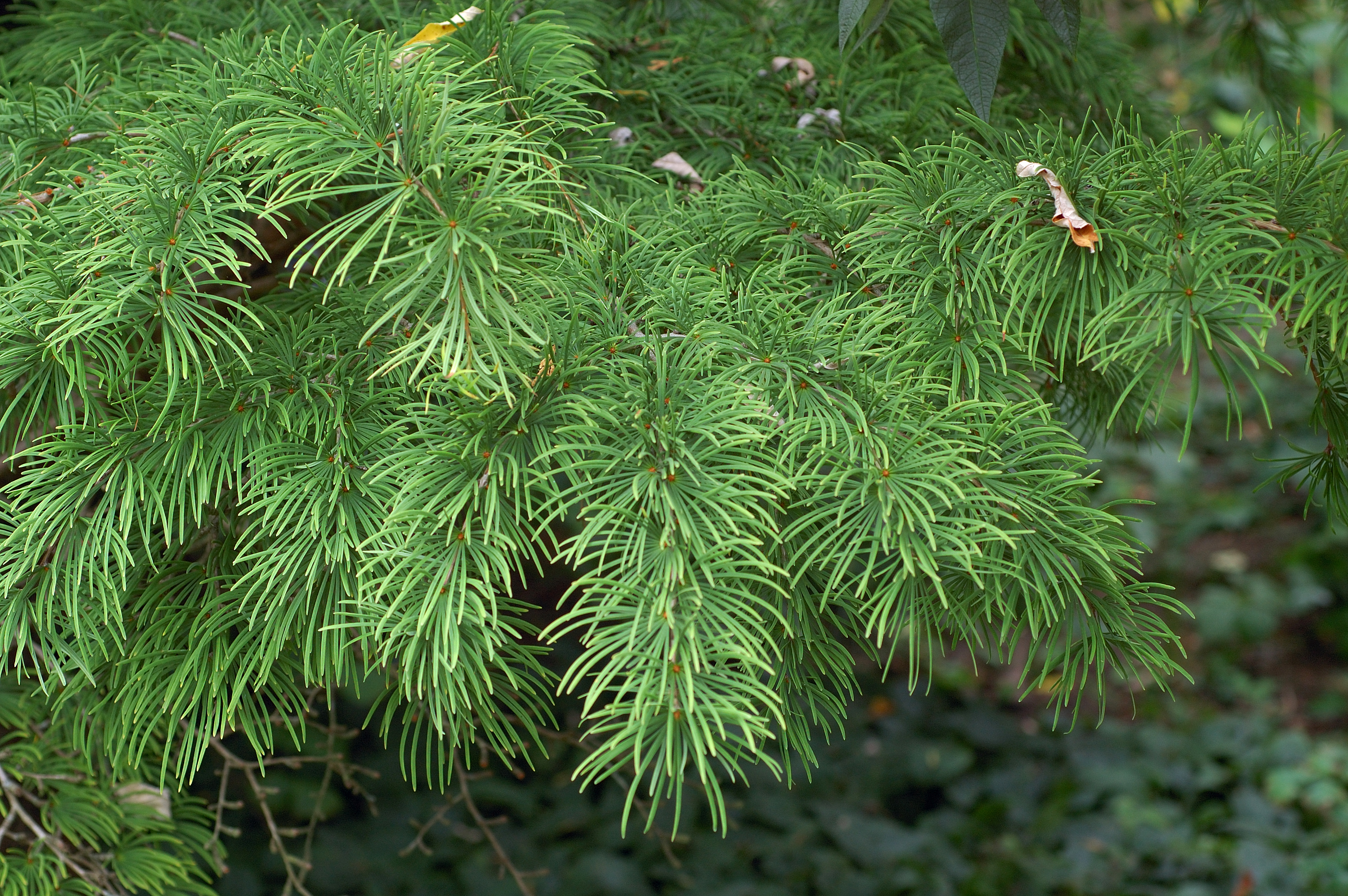

Scientific classification
- Kingdom: Plantae
- Clade: Tracheophytes
- Clade: Gymnosperms
- Division: Pinophyta
- Class: Pinopsida
- Order: Pinales
- Family: Pinaceae
- Subfamily: Abietoideae
- Genus: Pseudolarix; Gordon

Species
- P. amabilis (N. Nelson) Rehder; †P. japonica Tanai & Onoe; †P. wehrii Gooch

Synonyms
- †Archaeolarix Teslenko; Chrysolarix Moore; Laricopsis Kent

= Pseudolarix =

Pseudolarix Temporal range: 131–0 Ma Early Cretaceous to recent

Genus of coniferous trees

Pseudolarix is a genus of coniferous trees in the pine family, Pinaceae, containing three species, the single extant Pseudolarix amabilis and the two extinct species Pseudolarix japonica and Pseudolarix wehrii. Pseudolarix species are commonly known as golden larch, but are not true larches (Larix) being more closely related to Keteleeria, Abies and Cedrus. P. amabilis is native to eastern China, occurring in small areas in the mountains of southern Anhui, Zhejiang, Fujian, Jiangxi, Hunan, Hubei and eastern Sichuan, at altitudes of 100–1,500 m (328–4,921 ft). P. wehrii is described from fossils dating to the Early Eocene (Ypresian), of Western North America where it is found in the Eocene Okanagan Highlands Allenby and Klondike Mountain Formations. The youngest known occurrence is of mummified fossils found in the Late Eocene Buchanan Lake Formation on Axel Heiberg Island. P. japonica is known from Middle Miocene to Pliocene sediments in Japan and Miocene deposits of Korea. Fossils assigned to Pseudolarix as a genus date possibly as old as the Early Cretaceous Hauterivian stage in Mongolia.

== Description ==
Pseudolarix is a deciduous coniferous tree reaching 30–40 m (98–131 ft) tall, with a broad conic crown. The shoots are dimorphic, with long shoots and short shoots similar to a larch, though the short shoots are not so markedly short, lengthening about 5 mm annually. The leaves are bright green, 3–6 cm long and 2–3 mm broad, with two glaucous stomatal bands on the underside; they turn a brilliant golden yellow before falling in the autumn, hence the common name. The leaves are arranged spirally, widely spaced on long shoots, and in a dense whorl on the short shoots.

The cones are distinctive, superficially resembling a small globe artichoke, 4–7 cm long and 4–6 cm broad, with pointed triangular scales; they mature about 7 months after pollination, when (like fir and cedar cones) they disintegrate to release the winged seeds. The male cones, as in Keteleeria, are produced in umbels of several together in one bud.

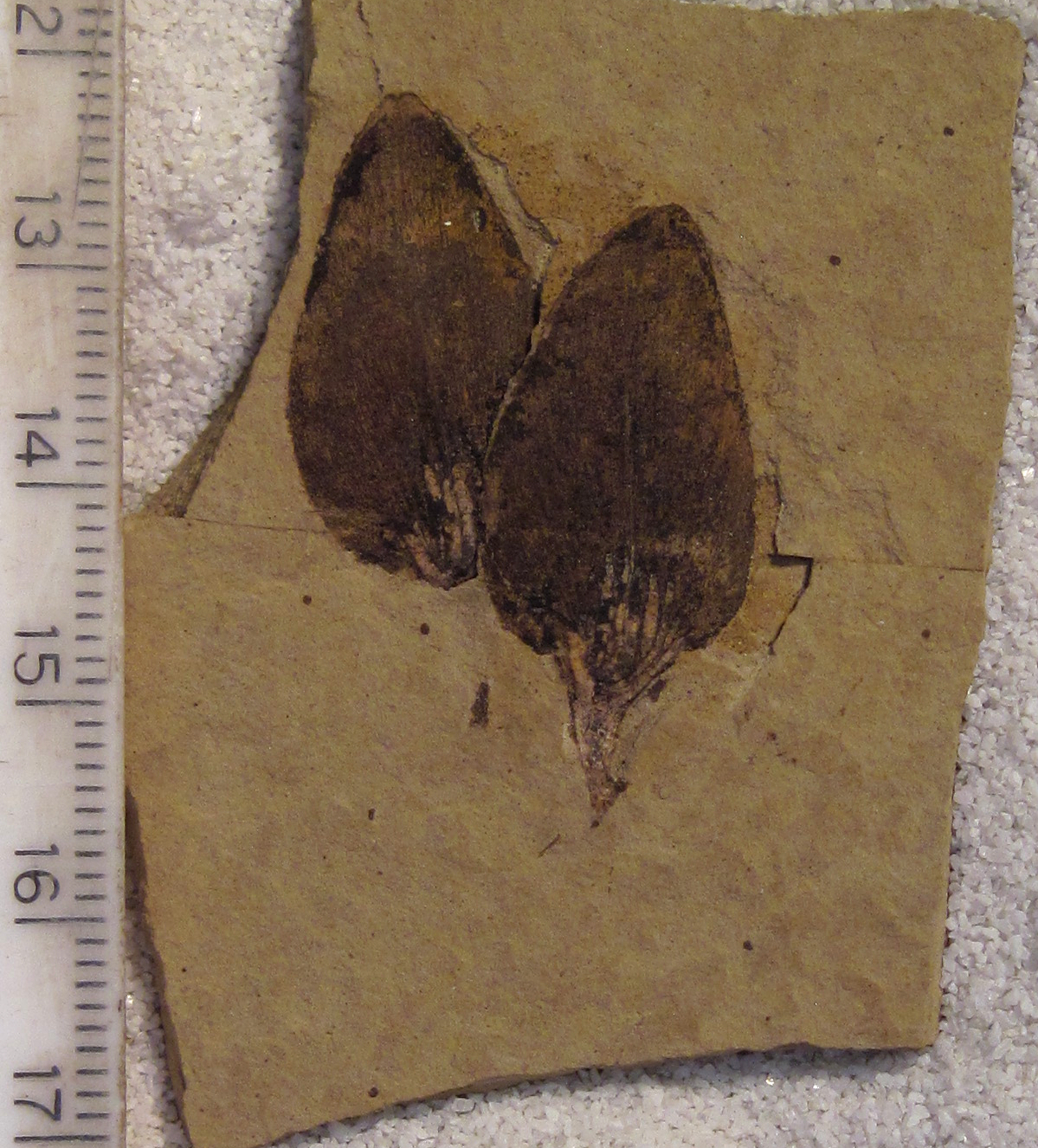
Pseudolarix wehrii cone scale fossils, Ypresian

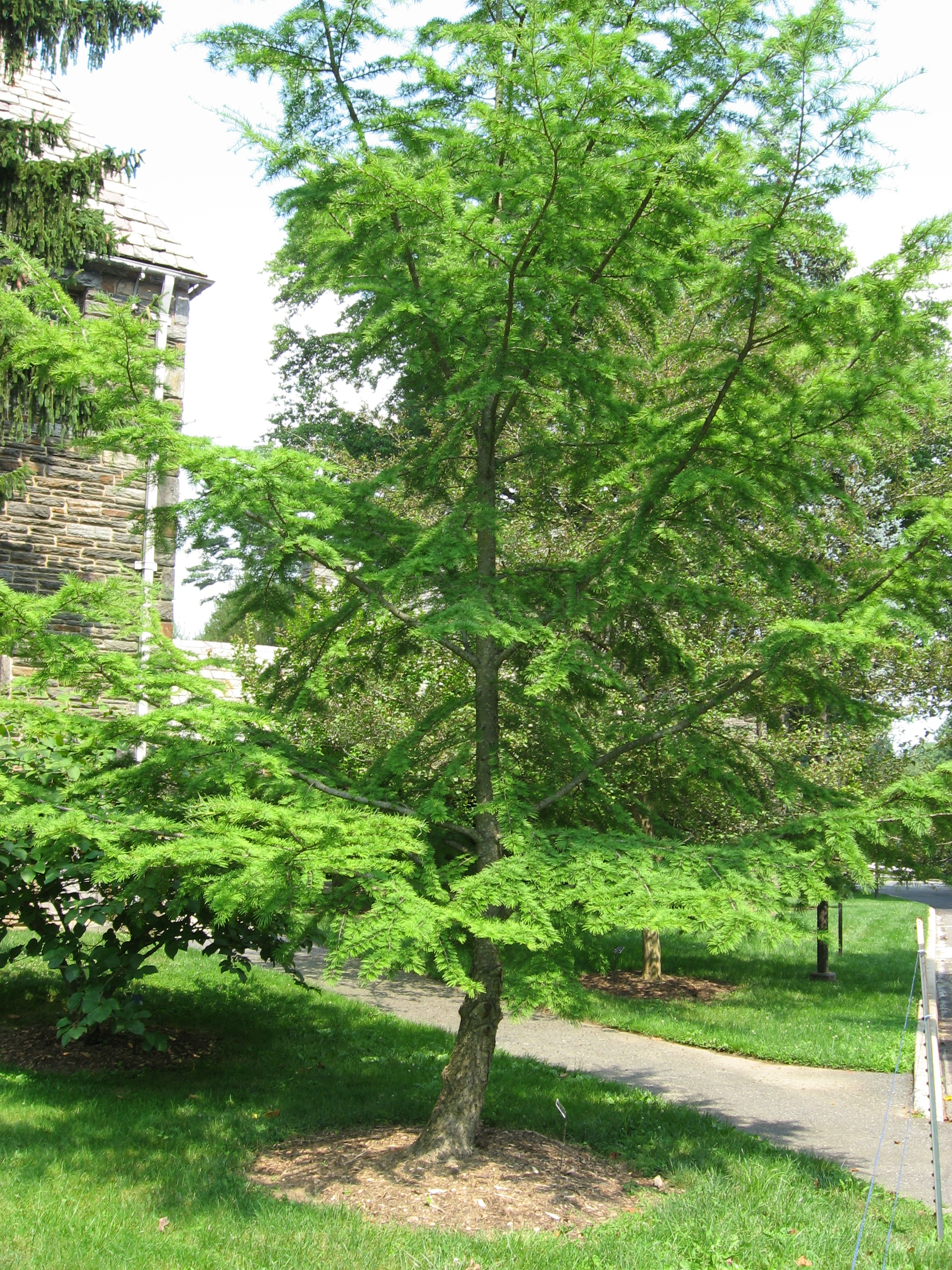
Full tree

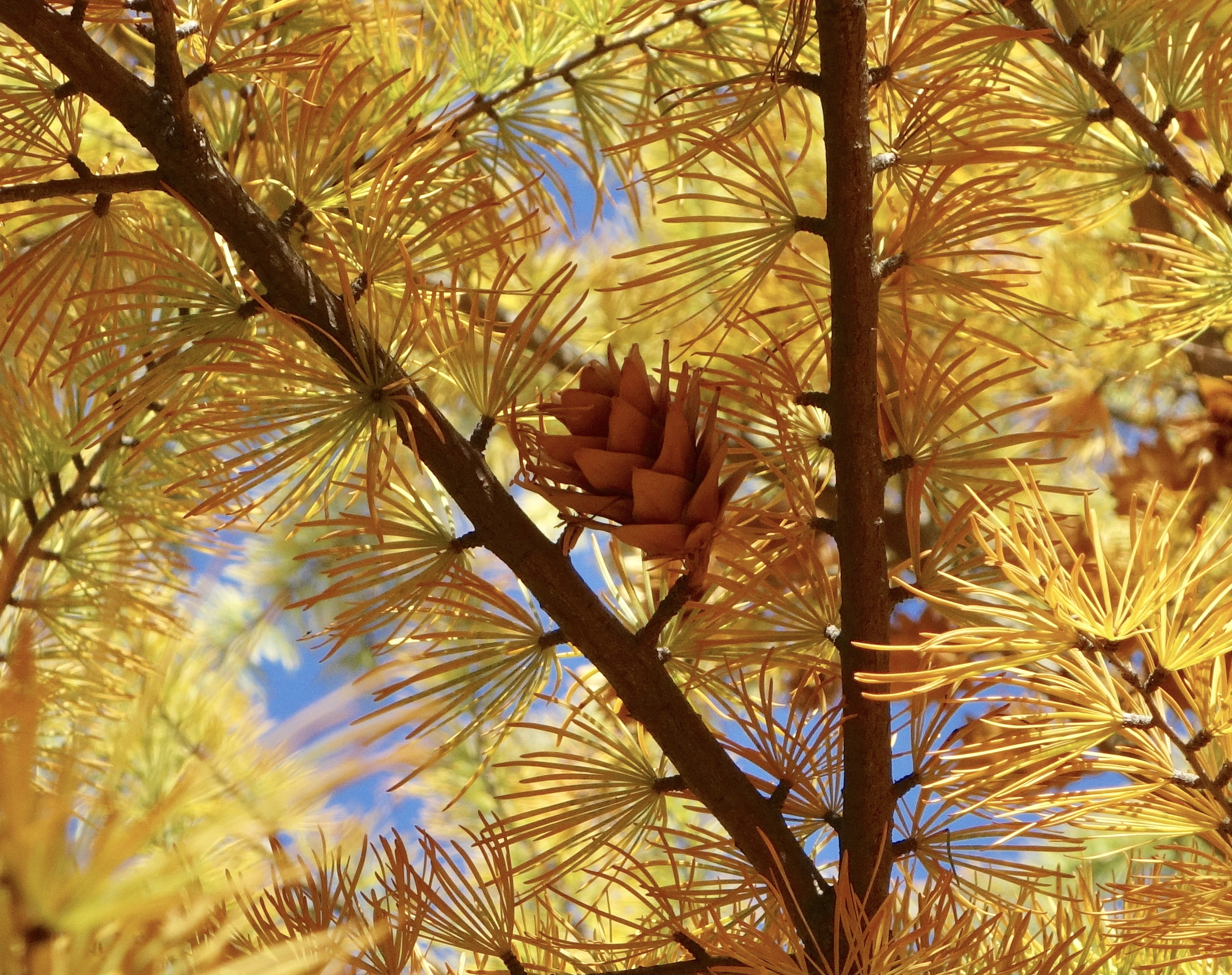
Needles and mature cone in fall

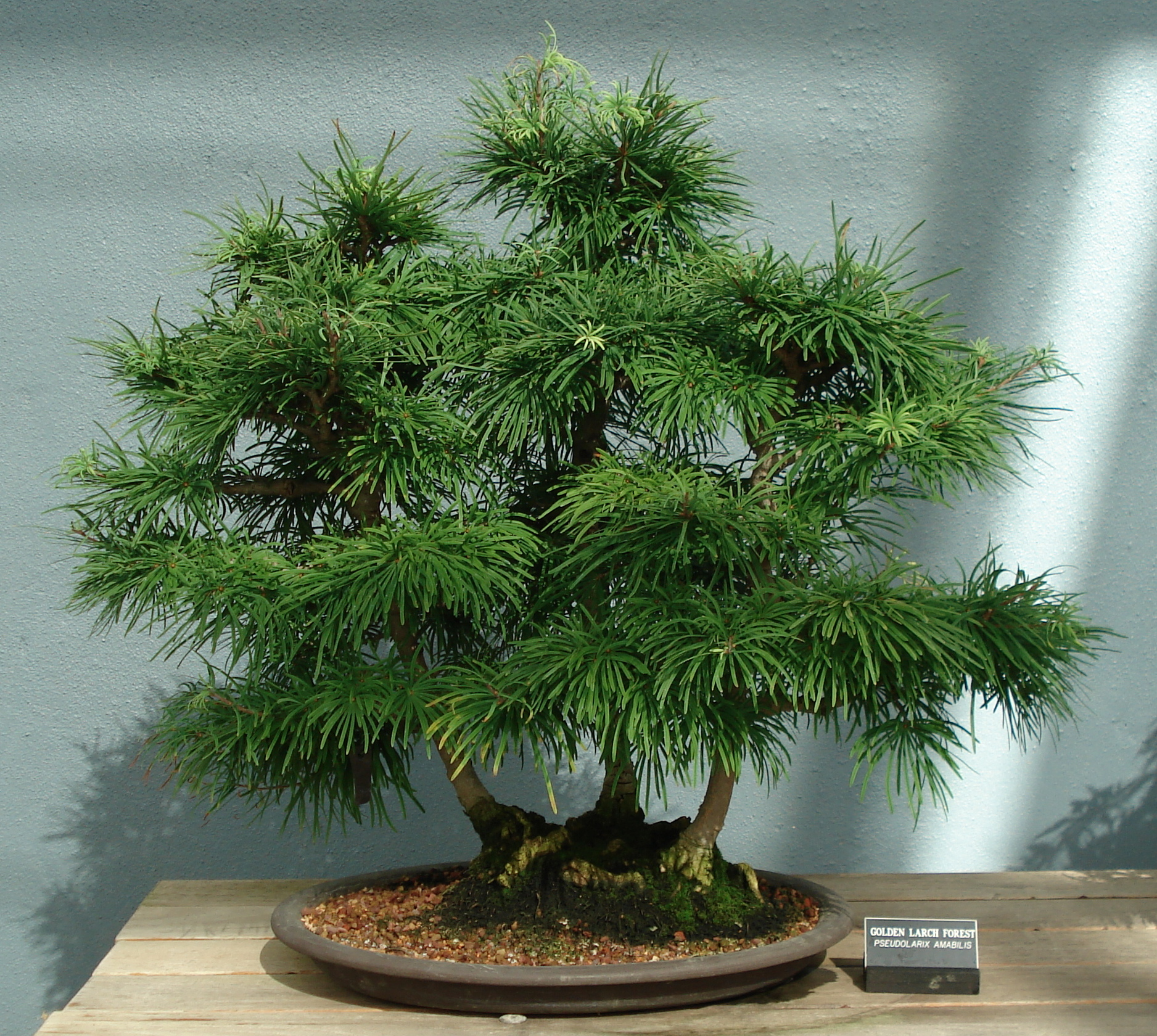
Bonsai example
