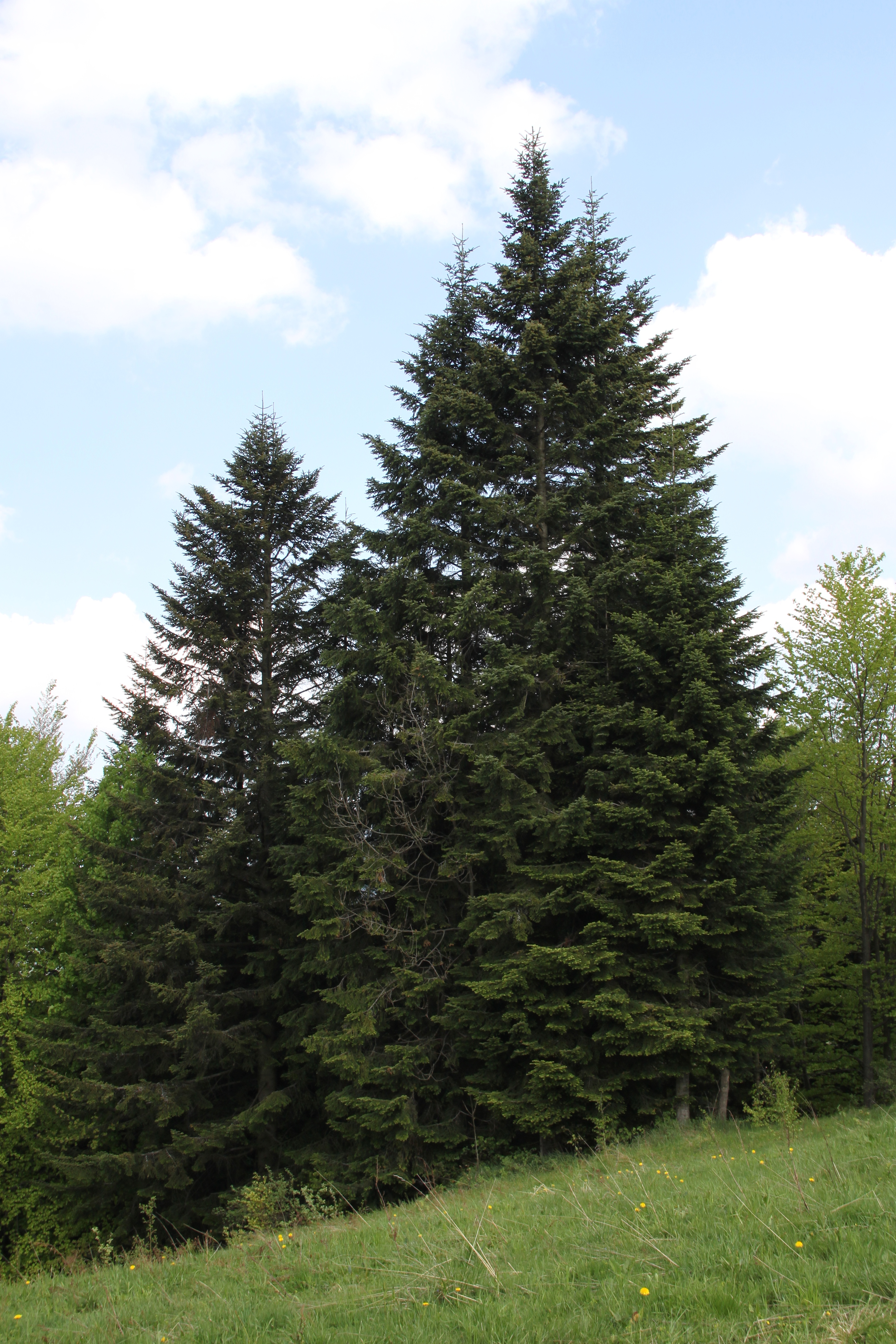
- Silver fir in Beskid Żywiecki, Poland

Scientific classification
- Kingdom: Plantae
- Clade: Tracheophytes
- Clade: Gymnosperms
- Division: Pinophyta
- Class: Pinopsida
- Order: Pinales
- Family: Pinaceae
- Subfamily: Abietoideae (Bercht. & J.Presl)

Genera
- Abies; Cedrus; Keteleeria; Nothotsuga; Pseudolarix; Tsuga

Synonyms
- Abietaceae Bercht. & J.Presl

= Abietoideae =

Abietoideae Temporal range: Early Cretaceous–Present

Subfamily of coniferous trees

Abietoideae is a subfamily of the conifer family Pinaceae. The name is from the genus Abies (firs), which contains most of the species in the genus. Six genera are currently assigned to this subfamily: Abies, Cedrus, Keteleeria, Nothotsuga, Pseudolarix, and Tsuga. The group was formerly treated as a separate family, the Abietaceae, by some plant taxonomy systems, such as the Wettstein system.

== Phylogeny ==
Based on transcriptome analysis, Cedrus is sister to the rest of the Abietoideae.

- Pinaceae
  - Abietoideae (firs and allies)
    - Cedreae
      - Cedrus (cedars)
    - - Pseudolariceae
        - Pseudolarix (golden larches)
        - - Nothotsuga (1 sp.)
          - Tsuga (hemlocks)
      - Abieteae
        - Keteleeria (1 sp.)
        - Abies (firs)
  - Pinoideae (pines, larches, etc)
