= Eathiestrobus =

Eathiestrobus Temporal range: Kimmeridgian–Berriasian

Scientific classification
- Kingdom: Plantae
- Clade: Tracheophytes
- Clade: Gymnospermae
- Division: Pinophyta
- Class: Pinopsida
- Order: Pinales
- Family: Pinaceae
- Genus: †Eathiestrobus; Rothwell et al., (2012).
- Species: †E. mackenziei

Binomial name
- †Eathiestrobus mackenziei Rothwell et al., (2012).

Extinct genus of conifers

Eathiestrobus mackenziei is a fossil conifer cone found in the Kimmeridge Clay Formation (Upper Jurassic) near Eathie, on the Black Isle in Scotland. It is the oldest fossil currently known in the family Pinaceae.

== Etymology ==
The genus name Eathiestrobus refers to the place it was found, Eathie, in Scotland, and strobus, which means cone. The species name mackenziei honours Mr. W. Mackenzie, who collected the specimen and donated it to the Hunterian Museum in 1896.

== Description ==
The holotype of Eathiestrobus mackenziei consists of an incomplete, 8 cm long seed cone. It is held in the Hunterian Museum and Art Gallery in Glasgow, and was originally identified as Pityostrobus, but later re-examined and reclassified as a new genus and species in 2012.

== Significance ==
Eathiestrobus extends the fossil record for the family Pinaceae by around 20 million years. The oldest fossil Pinaceae previously known were from the Early Cretaceous (Pinus yorkshirensis and Pityostrobus californensis). Eathiestrobus is also important because it clarifies the characteristics of the seed cones of Pinaceae, making it easier to identify members of the family in the fossil record.
