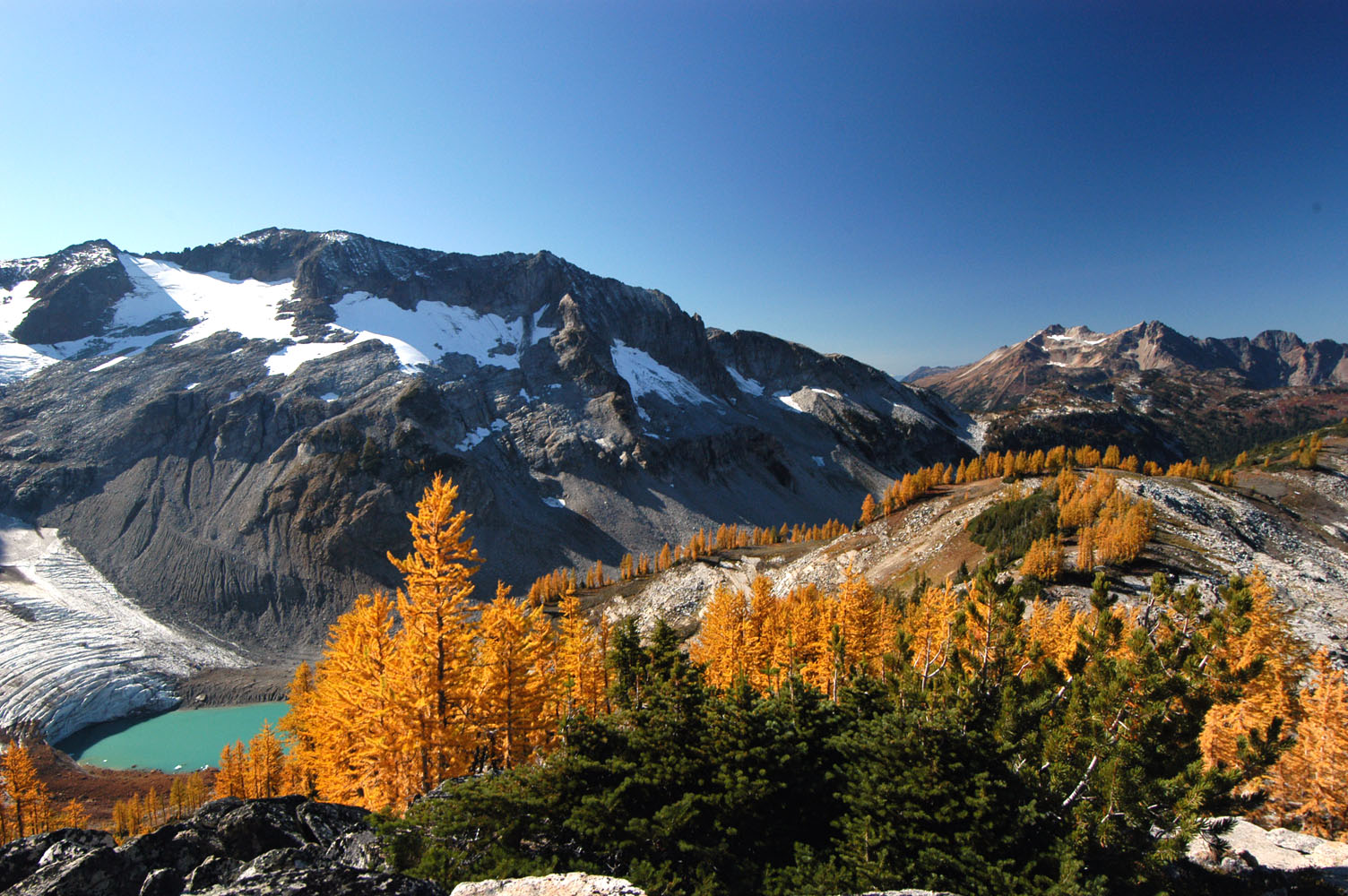
- Larix (golden), Abies (central foreground) and Pinus (right foreground)

Scientific classification
- Kingdom: Plantae
- Clade: Tracheophytes
- Clade: Gymnosperms
- Division: Pinophyta
- Class: Pinopsida
- Order: Pinales
- Family: Pinaceae; Lindley, 1836

Genera
- Abietoideae; Abies; Cedrus; Keteleeria; Nothotsuga; Pseudolarix; Tsuga; Pinoideae; Pinus; Picea; Pseudotsuga; Cathaya; Larix

Synonyms
- Abietaceae von Berchtold & Presl, 1820; Cedraceae Vest, 1818; Compsostrobaceae Delevoryas & Hope, 1973; †Kranneraceae Corda, 1866; Piceaceae Goroschankin, 1904

= Pinaceae =

Pinaceae Temporal range: Jurassic–Recent Possible Triassic record

Family of conifers

The Pinaceae, or pine family, is a large family of conifers, including many of the well-known conifers of commercial importance such as cedars, firs, hemlocks, larches, pines, and spruces. The family is included in the order Pinales, formerly known as Coniferales. Pinaceae have distinctive cones with woody scales bearing typically two ovules, and are supported as monophyletic by both morphological trait and genetic analysis. They are the largest extant conifer family in species diversity, with between 220 and 250 species (depending on taxonomic opinion) in 11 genera, and the second-largest (after Cupressaceae) in geographical range, found in most of the Northern Hemisphere, with the majority of the species in temperate climates, but ranging from subarctic to tropical. The family often forms the dominant component of boreal, coastal, and montane forests. One species, Pinus merkusii, grows just south of the equator in Southeast Asia. Major centres of diversity are found in the mountains of southwest China, Mexico, central Japan, and California.

== Description ==
The members of the family Pinaceae are trees (rarely shrubs) growing from 2 to 100 metres (7 to 300 feet) tall, mostly evergreen (except the deciduous Larix and Pseudolarix), resinous, monoecious, with subopposite or whorled branches, and spirally arranged, linear (needle-like) leaves. The embryos of Pinaceae have three to 24 cotyledons.

The female cones are large and usually woody, 2–60 centimetres (1–24 inches) long, with numerous spirally arranged scales, and two winged seeds on each scale. The male cones are small, 0.5–6 cm (1/4–2 1/4 in) long, and fall soon after pollination; pollen dispersal is by wind. Seed dispersal is mostly by wind, but some species have large seeds with reduced wings, and are dispersed by birds. Analysis of Pinaceae cones reveals how selective pressure has shaped the evolution of variable cone size and function throughout the family. Variation in cone size in the family has likely resulted from the variation of seed dispersal mechanisms available in their environments over time. All Pinaceae with seeds weighing less than 90 milligrams are seemingly adapted for wind dispersal. Pines having seeds larger than 100 mg are more likely to have benefited from adaptations that promote animal dispersal, particularly by birds. Pinaceae that persist in areas where tree squirrels are abundant do not seem to have evolved adaptations for bird dispersal.

Boreal conifers have multiple adaptations to survive winters, including the tree's conical shape to shed snow, strong tracheid vessels to tolerate ice pressure, and a waxy covering on the needle leaves to minimise water loss.

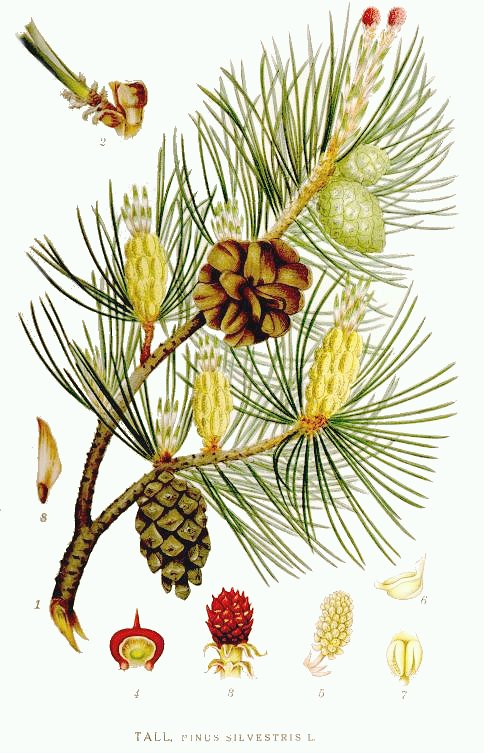
Features of Pinus sylvestris

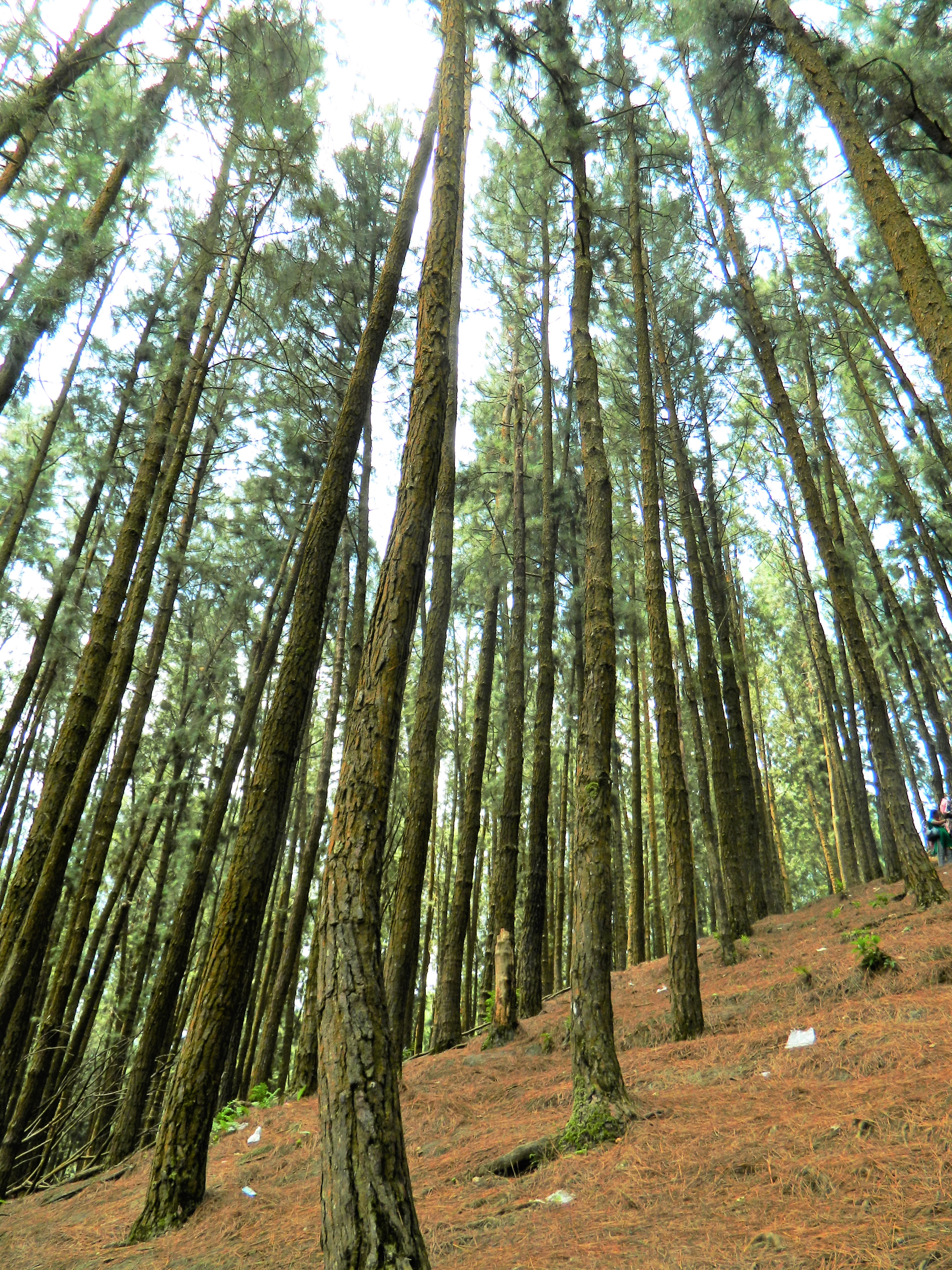
Cultivated pine forest in Western Ghats, India

== Evolution ==
=== Fossil history ===
The Pinaceae diverged from other conifer groups during the late Carboniferous ~313 million years ago. Various possible stem-group relatives have been reported from as early as the Late Permian (Lopingian) The extinct conifer cone genus Schizolepidopsis likely represent stem-group members of the Pinaceae, the first good records of which are in the Middle-Late Triassic, with abundant records during the Jurassic across Eurasia. The oldest crown group (descendant of the last common ancestor of all living species) member of Pinaceae is the cone Eathiestrobus, known from the Upper Jurassic (lower Kimmeridgian, 157.3-154.7 million years ago) of Scotland, which likely belongs to the pinoid grouping of the family. Pinaceae rapidly radiated during the Early Cretaceous. Members of the modern genera Pinus (pines), Picea (spruce), and Cedrus (cedar) first appear during the Early Cretaceous. The extinct Cretaceous genera Pseudoaraucaria and Obirastrobus appear to be members of Abietoideae, while Pityostrobus appears to be non-monophyletic, containing many disparately related members of Pinaceae. While Pinaceae, and indeed both of its subfamilies, substantially predate the break up of the super-continent Pangea, its distribution was limited to northern Laurasia. During the Cenozoic, Pinaceae had higher rates of species turnover than Southern Hemisphere conifers, thought to be driven by range shifts in response to glacial cycle.

=== Phylogeny ===
Molecular studies show that Gnetophyta is the sister group to the Pinaceae, the lineages having diverged during the early-mid Carboniferous. This is the gnepine hypothesis. The Abietoideae and the Pinoideae diverged in the Jurassic. Pineae and Lariceae diverged in the Late Jurassic, while the Abieteae and Pseudolariceae diverged in the Cretaceous. A transcriptomic analysis in 2018 divided the Pinaceae into two clades, which have since been considered the two subfamilies Abietoideae and Pinoideae.

- Pinaceae
  - Abietoideae
    - Cedreae
      Cedrus
    - - Pseudolariceae
        - Pseudolarix (golden larches)
        - - Nothotsuga (bristlecone hemlock)
          - Tsuga (hemlocks)
      - Abieteae
        - Keteleeria
        - Abies (firs)
  - Pinoideae
    - Lariceae
      - Pseudotsuga (Douglas‑firs)
      - Larix (larches)
    - Pineae
      - - Cathaya (1 sp.)
        - Pinus (pines)
      - Picea (spruces)

A study by J. D. Lockwood and colleagues in 2013 produced a broadly similar phylogeny, but with different placements for Pseudolarix and Cathaya. In this scheme, Pseudolariceae is subsumed by Abieteae.

=== Taxonomic history ===
Classification of the subfamilies and genera of Pinaceae has been subject to debate in the past. Pinaceae ecology, morphology, and history have all been used as the basis for methods of analyses of the family. In 1891, Van Tieghem divided the family into two subfamilies, using the number and position of resin canals in the primary vascular region of the young taproot as the primary consideration. In 1910, Friedrich Vierhapper divided the family into two tribes based on the occurrence and type of long–short shoot dimorphism. In 1976, Charles Miller divided the subfamilies and genera based on the consideration of features of ovulate cone anatomy among extant and fossil members of the family.

Cone features used in Pinaceae taxonomy

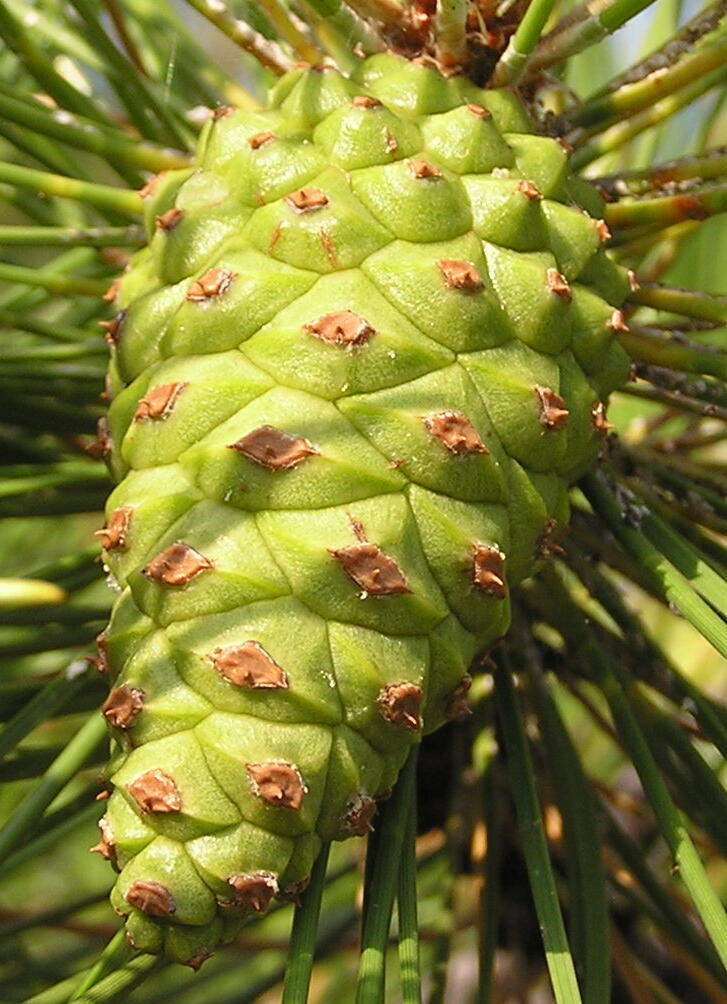
Immature 2nd-year cone of Pinus nigra, light brown umbo on green cone scales

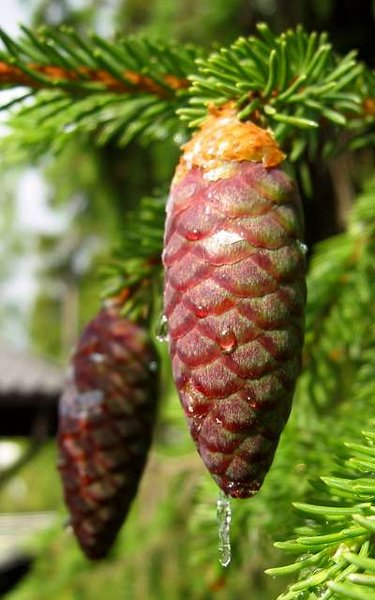
Immature cone of Picea abies, no umbo

For example, Price (1987) classified the Pinaceae into 11 genera, grouped into four subfamilies, based on the microscopical anatomy and the morphology of the cones, pollen, wood, seeds, and leaves:

- Subfamily Pinoideae (Pinus): cones are biennial, rarely triennial, with each year's scale-growth distinct, forming an umbo on each scale, the cone scale base is broad, concealing the seeds fully from abaxial (below the phloem vessels) view, the seed is without resin vesicles, the seed wing holds the seed in a pair of claws, leaves have primary stomatal bands adaxial (above the xylem) or equally on both surfaces.
- Subfamily Piceoideae (Picea): cones are annual, without a distinct umbo, the cone scale base is broad, concealing the seeds fully from abaxial view, seed is without resin vesicles, blackish, the seed wing holds the seed loosely in a cup, leaves have primary stomatal bands adaxial (above the xylem) or equally on both surfaces.
- Subfamily Laricoideae (Larix, Pseudotsuga, and Cathaya): cones are annual, without a distinct umbo, the cone scale base is broad, concealing the seeds fully from abaxial view, the seed is without resin vesicles, whitish, the seed wing holds the seed tightly in a cup, leaves have primary stomatal bands abaxial only.
- Subfamily Abietoideae (Abies, Cedrus, Pseudolarix, Keteleeria, Nothotsuga, and Tsuga): cones are annual, without a distinct umbo, the cone scale base is narrow, with the seeds partly visible in abaxial view, the seed has resin vesicles, the seed wing holds the seed tightly in a cup, leaves have primary stomatal bands abaxial only.

Subsequently, Yang (2022) reclassified the Pinaceae by grouping the 11 genera into two subfamilies on the basis of phylogenetic analysis:

- Subfamily Pinoideae (Cathaya, Larix, Picea, Pinus, and Pseudotsuga)
- Subfamily Abietoideae (Abies, Cedrus, Pseudolarix, Keteleeria, Nothotsuga, and Tsuga)

== Genera ==
=== Extant ===
- Abies
- Cedrus
- Keteleeria
- Nothotsuga
- Pseudolarix
- Tsuga
- Pinus
- Picea
- Pseudotsuga
- Cathaya
- Larix

=== Extinct ===
- †Tsugaepollenites
- †Abietipites
- †Cedripites
- †Schizolepidopsis
- †Eathiestrobus
- †Pesudoaraucaria
- †Obirostrobus
- †Pityostrobus

== Defense mechanisms ==
External stresses on plants have the ability to change the structure and composition of forest ecosystems. Common external stresses that Pinaceae experience are herbivore and pathogen attacks, which can kill trees. In order to combat these stresses, trees need to adapt or evolve defenses against these stresses. Pinaceae have evolved myriad mechanical and chemical defenses, or a combination of the two, in order to protect themselves against antagonists. Pinaceae have the ability to up-regulate a combination of constitutive mechanical and chemical strategies to further their defenses.

Pinaceae defenses are prevalent in the bark of the trees. This part of the tree contributes a complex defensive boundary against external antagonists. Constitutive and induced defenses are both found in the bark.

=== Constitutive defenses ===
Constitutive defenses are typically the first line of defenses used against antagonists. These defenses include sclerified cells, lignified periderm cells, and secondary compounds such as phenolics and resins. Constitutive defenses are always expressed and offer immediate protection from invaders but can be defeated by antagonists that have evolved adaptations to these defense mechanisms. Common secondary compounds used by Pinaceae are phenolics or polyphenols. These are preserved in vacuoles of polyphenolic parenchyma cells (PP) in the secondary phloem.

=== Induced defenses ===
Induced defense responses need to be activated by certain cues, such as herbivore damage or other biotic signals.

A common induced defense mechanism used by Pinaceae is resins. Resins are also one of the primary defenses used against attack. Resins are short term defenses that are composed of a complex combination of volatile mono- (C_{10}) and sesquiterpenes (C_{15}) and nonvolatile diterpene resin acids (C_{20}). They are produced and stored in specialized secretory areas known as resin ducts, resin blisters, or resin cavities. Resins have the ability to wash away, trap, fend off antagonists, and are also involved in wound sealing. They are an effective defense mechanism because they have toxic and inhibitory effects on invaders, such as insects or pathogens. Resins could have developed as an evolutionary defense against bark beetle attacks. One well researched resin present in Pinaceae is oleoresin. Oleoresin had been found to be a valuable part of the conifer defense mechanism against biotic attacks. They are found in secretory tissues in tree stems, roots, and leaves.

Many studies use methyl jasmonate as an antagonist. Methyl jasmonate induces defense responses in the stems of multiple Pinaceae species. Methyl jasmonate stimulates the activation of PP cells and formation of xylem traumatic resin ducts (TD). These are involved in the release of phenolics and resins, both forms of defense mechanism.

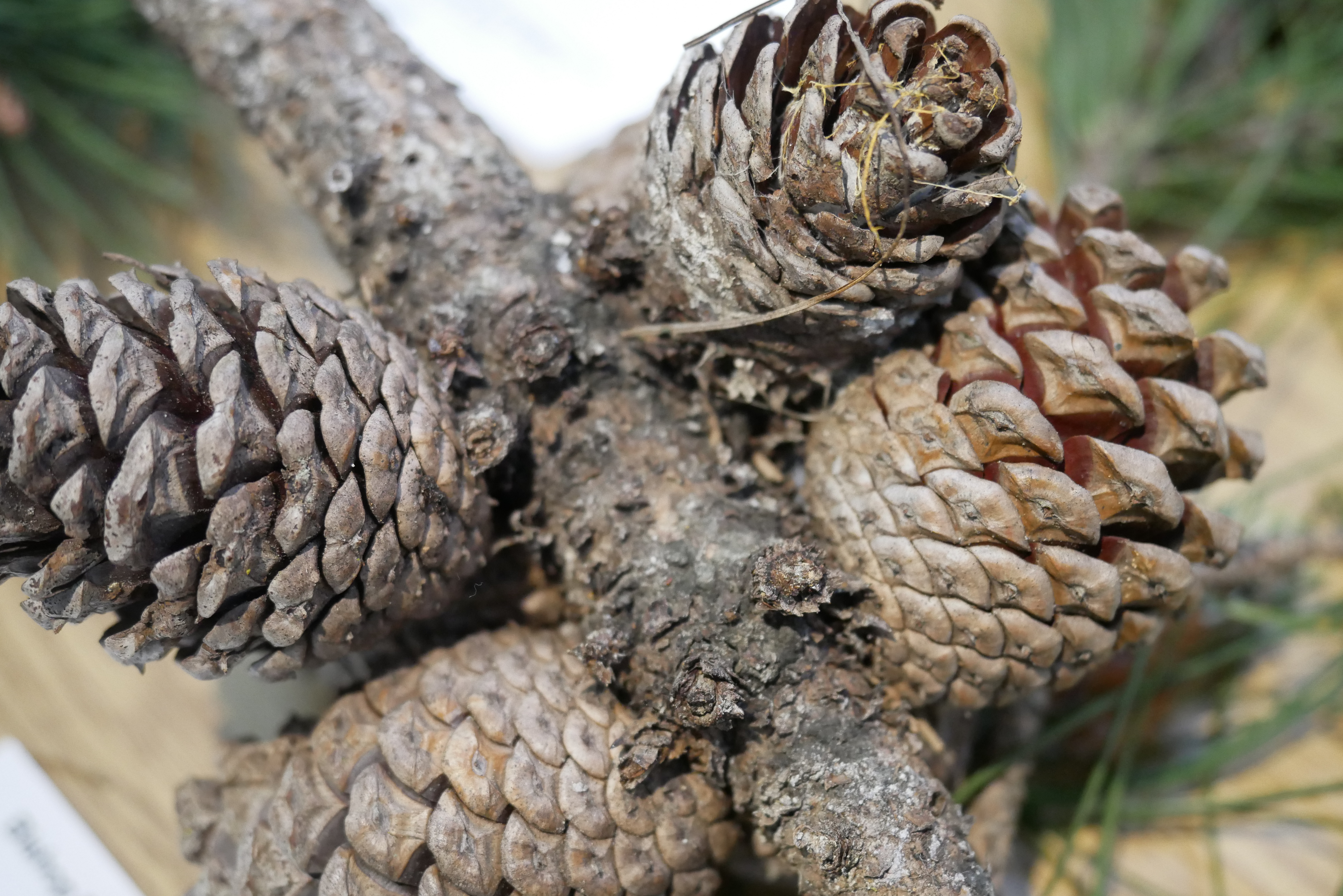
Bishop pine cones

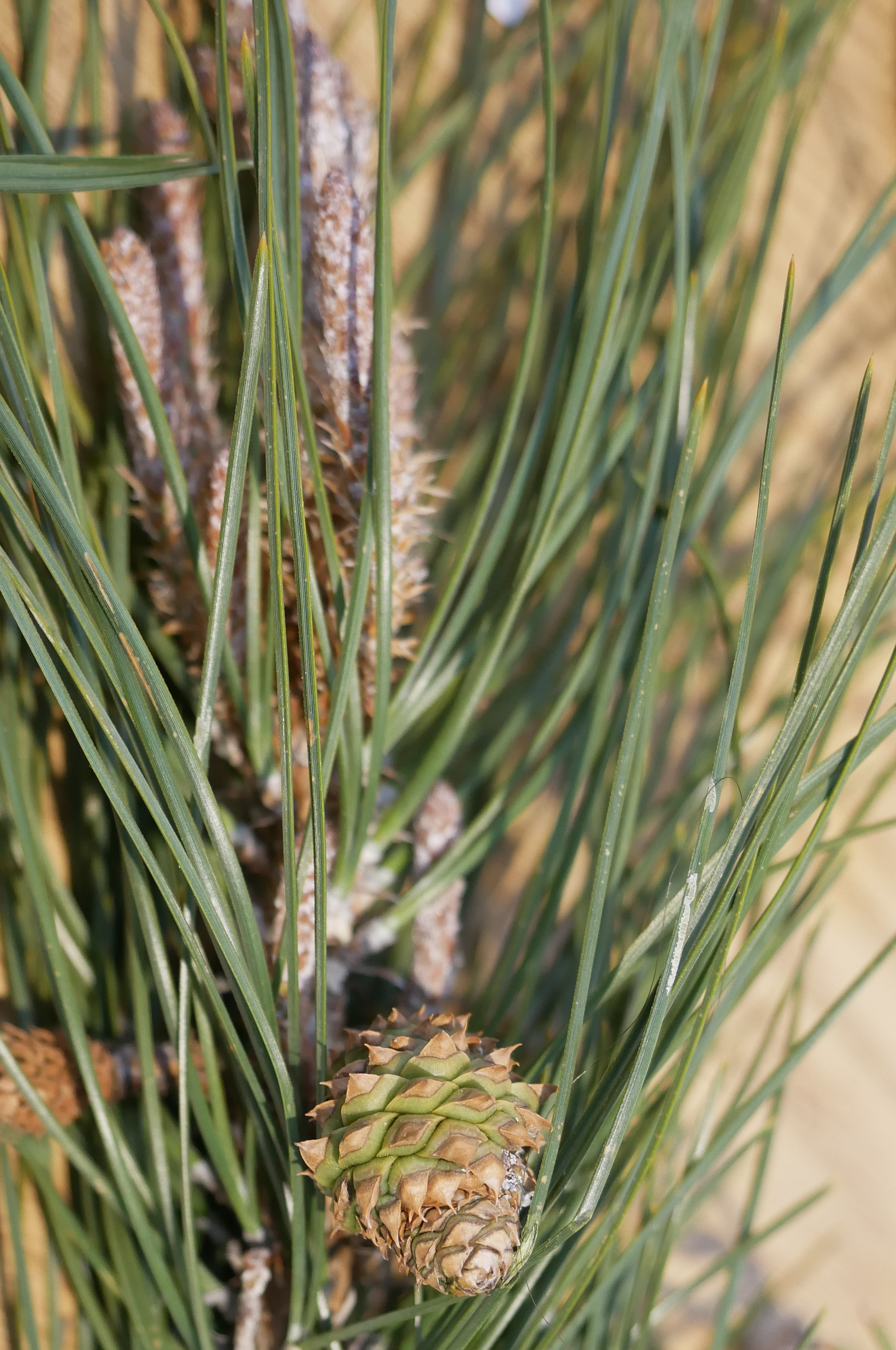
Knobcone pine cone
