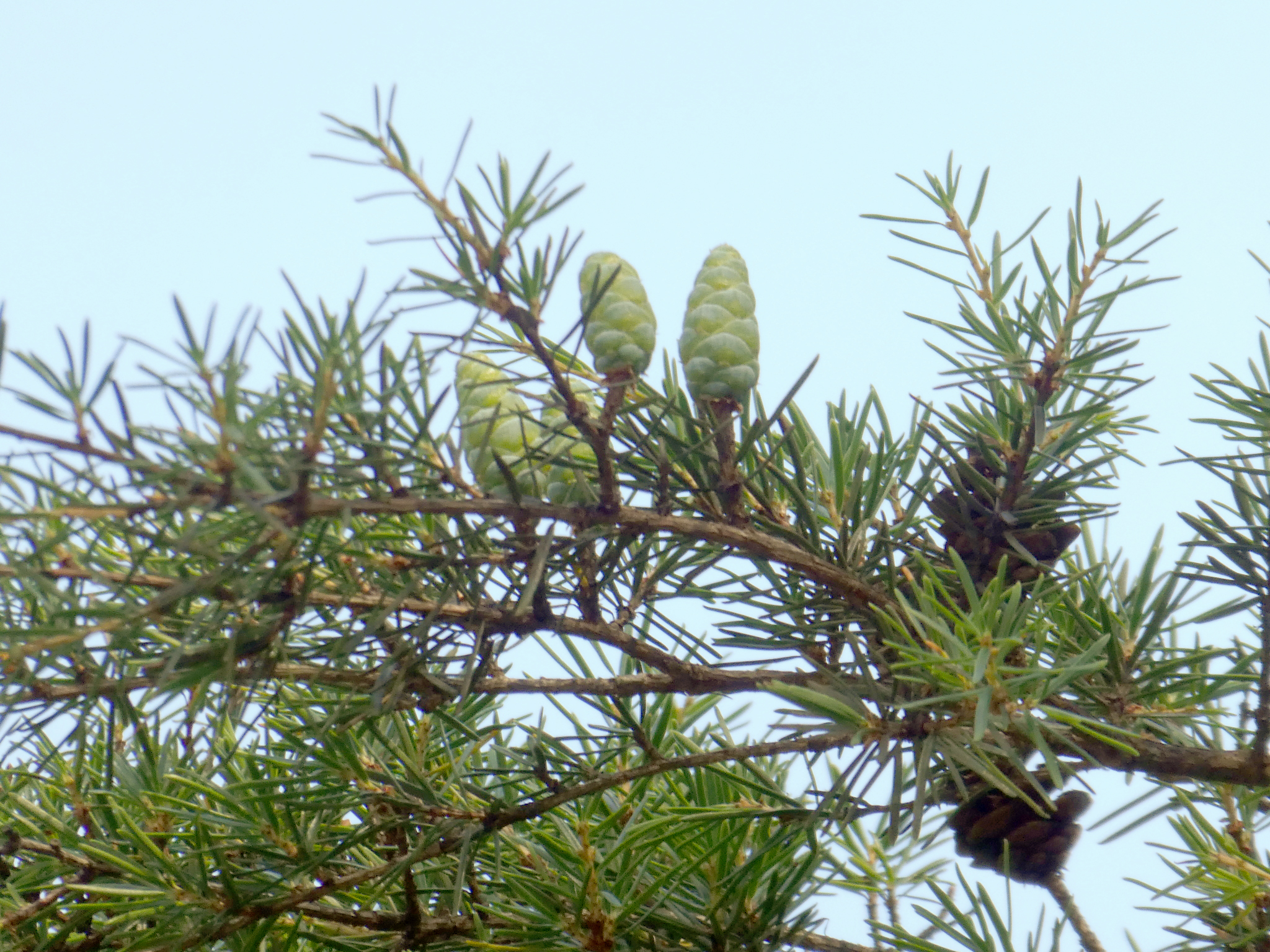
- Nothotsuga longibracteata

Conservation status
- Near Threatened (IUCN 3.1)

Scientific classification
- Kingdom: Plantae
- Clade: Tracheophytes
- Clade: Gymnosperms
- Division: Pinophyta
- Class: Pinopsida
- Order: Pinales
- Family: Pinaceae
- Subfamily: Abietoideae
- Genus: Nothotsuga; Hu ex C.N.Page
- Species: N. longibracteata

Binomial name
- Nothotsuga longibracteata (W.C.Cheng) Hu ex C.N.Page

Synonyms
- Tsuga longibracteata W.C.Cheng; Nothotsuga tsugo-keteleeria (W.C.Cheng) Van Campo & Gaussen; Tsugo-keteleeria longibracteata (W.C.Cheng) Van Campo & Gaussen; Nothotsuga longibracteata subsp. fanjingshenensis Silba; Keteleeria longibracteata (W.C.Cheng) de Laub.

= Nothotsuga =

Nothotsuga Temporal range: Eocene–Recent

Genus of conifers

Nothotsuga is a genus of coniferous trees in the pine family, Pinaceae, endemic to China. Nothotsuga contains only one living species, Nothotsuga longibracteata, commonly known as the bristlecone hemlock or chang bao tie shan (长苞铁杉), which is found in southeastern China, in southern Fujian, northern Guangdong, northeast Guangxi, northeast Guizhou, and southwest Hunan.

The genus was more diverse in the past, with its earliest fossils being known from Europe during the late Eocene epoch, with the genus being present in Europe as recently as the Pliocene. The oldest fossils near its current distribution dating to the Miocene epoch.

== Description ==
N. longibracteata is a large coniferous tree reaching 30 m (100 ft) tall. The leaves are flat, needle-like, 1.2–4 cm (0.5–1.6 in) long and 1–2 mm (0.04–0.08 in) broad, very similar to those of Tsuga. The cones are very similar to those of Keteleeria, but smaller, 2.5–5 cm (1–2 in) long, erect, and mature in about 6–8 months after pollination.

=== Taxonomy ===
In many respects, Nothotsuga is intermediate between the genera Keteleeria and Tsuga. It was discovered in 1932, and at first treated as Tsuga longibracteata, being classified in its own genus in 1989 when new research indicated how distinct it is from other species of Tsuga - by the larger, erect cones with exserted bracts, and (like Keteleeria) male cones in umbels, and from Keteleeria by the shorter leaves and smaller cones.

== Conservation ==
It is a very rare tree listed as a near-threatened species by the International Union for Conservation of Nature due to historical deforestation, though it is now protected.
