= Hangzhou–Fuzhou–Shenzhen railway =

Chinese railway line

Hangzhou–Fuzhou–Shenzhen railway 杭福深客运专线
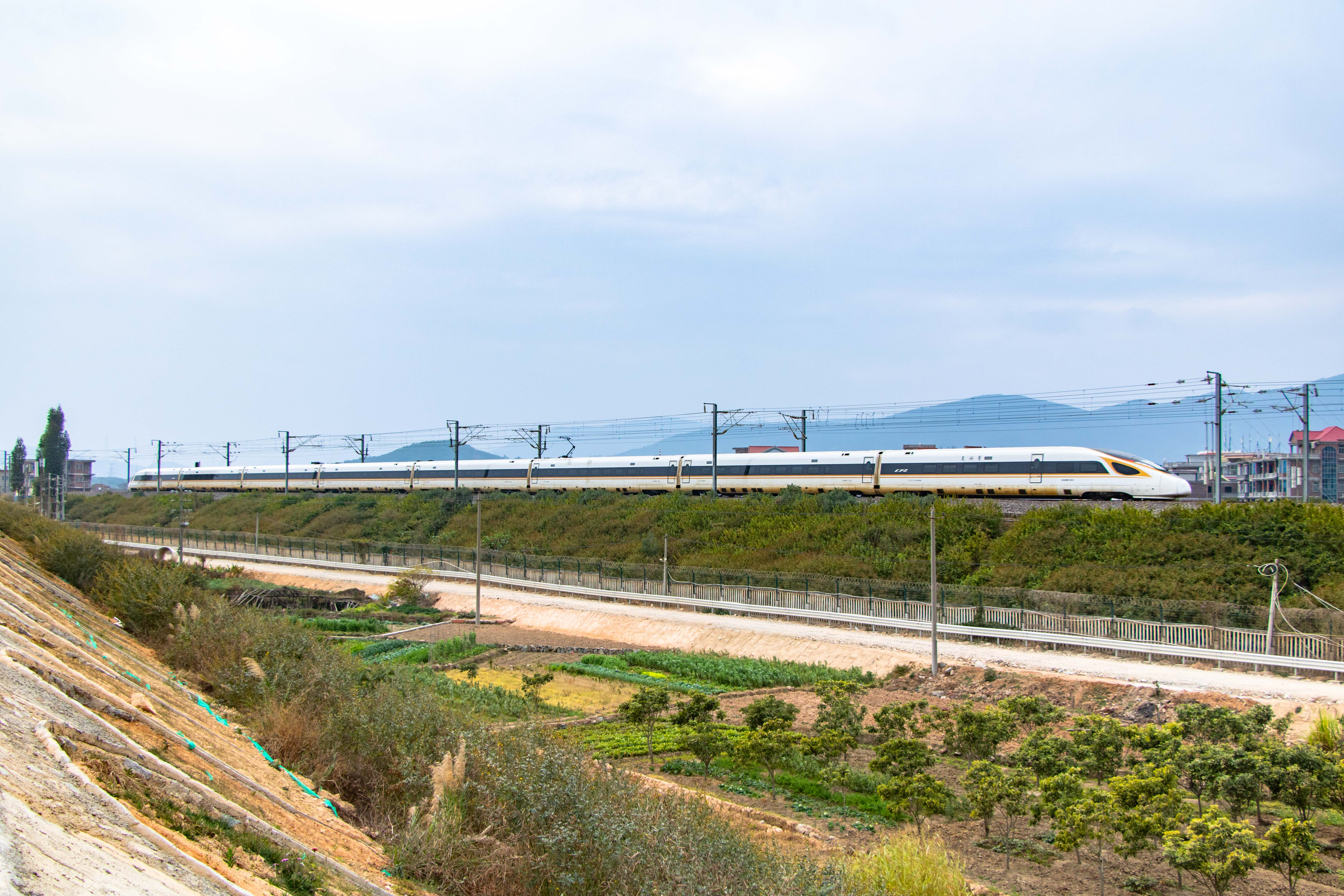
- A CR400BF train passing through Putian, Fujian

Overview
- Owner: China Railway
- Locale: Zhejiang, Fujian, Guangdong

Service
- Type: High-speed rail Heavy rail
- Operator: China Railway High-speed

History
- Opened: December 28, 2013

Technical
- Line length: 1,495 km (929 mi)
- Track gauge: 1,435 mm (4 ft 8 1/2 in)
- Operating speed: 350–250 km/h (220–160 mph)

Hangzhou–Fuzhou–Shenzhen railway
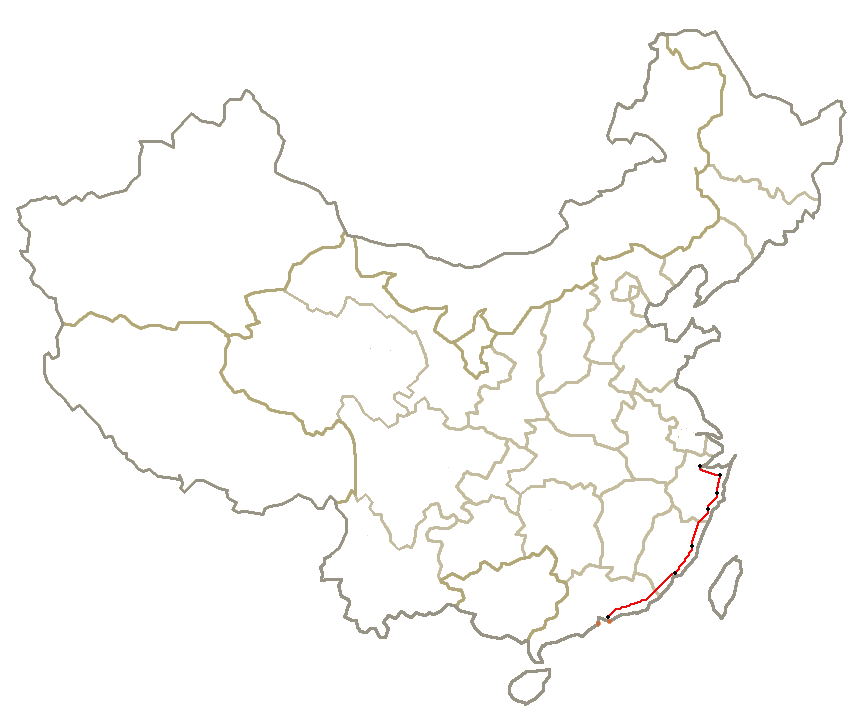
- Route of the Hangzhou–Fuzhou–Shenzhen high-speed railway
- Traditional Chinese: 杭福深客運專線
- Simplified Chinese: 杭福深客运专线
Transcriptions
Standard Mandarin
- Hanyu Pinyin: Hángfúshēn Kèyùn Zhuānxiàn
Yue: Cantonese
- Jyutping: hong^{4}fuk^{1}sam^{1} haak^{3}wan^{6} zyun^{1}sin^{3}
Southern Min
- Hokkien POJ: hâng-hok-chhim kheh-ūn choan-sòaⁿ

Southeast Coastal Railway
- Traditional Chinese: 東南沿海鐵路 or 東南沿海快速通道
- Simplified Chinese: 东南沿海铁路 or 东南沿海快速通道
Transcriptions
Standard Mandarin
- Hanyu Pinyin: Dōngnán Yánhǎi Tiělù or Dōngnán Yánhǎi Kuàisù Tōngdào^{3}lou^{6}
Yue: Cantonese
- Jyutping: dung^{1}naam^{4} jyun^{4}hoi^{2} tit^{3}lou^{6} or dung^{1}naam^{4} jyun^{4}hoi^{2} faai^{3}cuk^{1} tung^{1}dou^{6}
Southern Min
- Hokkien POJ: tang-lâm iân-hái thih-lō͘ or tang-lâm iân-hái khòai-sok Thang-tō

The Hangzhou–Fuzhou–Shenzhen railway, also called the Hangshen railway (Chinese: 杭福深客运专线, formerly 东南沿海快速通道 or 东南沿海铁路) is the dual-track, electrified, high-speed rail lines (HSR) in service along the southeastern coast of China, linking the Yangtze River Delta on the East China Sea and Pearl River Delta on the South China Sea. It is one of the eight arterial high-speed rail corridors of the national 4+4 high-speed rail grid. Major cities along the route include Hangzhou, Ningbo, Taizhou and Wenzhou in Zhejiang; Fuzhou, Quanzhou, Xiamen and Zhangzhou in Fujian; and Chaozhou, Shantou, Shanwei, Huizhou and Shenzhen in Guangdong. An additional bridge will be built across Hangzhou Bay for high-speed rail, which would provide a direct link between Shanghai and Ningbo.

The Southeast Coast HSR Corridor is approximately 1,745 km (1,084 mi) in length, and crosses three coastal provinces, Zhejiang, Fujian and Guangdong. The southeast coast is the only region of high-speed rail construction where no previous conventional railroads existed. Hence, the high-speed rail lines built on the southeast coast will, for the most part are designed to carry both passenger and freight traffic, and will not be passenger-dedicated lines that comprise most of the other HSR corridors in China.

The line was later folded into the Coastal corridor as part of the reorganization into the national 8+8 high-speed rail grid plan. A number of sections, particularly in the southeast coast in Fujian and Guangdong Provinces, are now being superseded by a newly constructed roughly parallel 350kph rated fully passenger-dedicated lines.

== Constituent lines ==
All lines are now in operation.

Section	Description	Designed speed (km/h)	Length (km)	Construction start date	Open date
Hangzhou–Fuzhou–Shenzhen railway	PDL linking coastal cities from Hangzhou to Shenzhen, built in five segments.	350-250	1495	2005-08-01	2013-12-28
Hangzhou–Ningbo Section (Hangzhou–Ningbo high-speed railway)	HSR from Hangzhou to Ningbo	350	152	2009-04	2013-07-01
Ningbo–Taizhou–Wenzhou Section (Ningbo–Taizhou–Wenzhou Railway)	Mixed passenger & freight HSR line along the coast of Zhejiang Province.	250	268	2005-10-27	2009-09-28
Wenzhou–Fuzhou Section (Wenzhou–Fuzhou Railway)	Mixed passenger & freight HSR line from Wenzhou to Fuzhou.	250	298	2005-01-08	2009-09-28
Fuzhou–Xiamen Section (Fuzhou–Xiamen Railway)	Mixed passenger & freight HSR line along the coast of Fujian Province from Fuzhou to Xiamen via Putian & Quanzhou.	250	275	2005-10-01	2010-04-26
Xiamen–Shenzhen Section (Xiamen–Shenzhen Railway)	Mixed passenger & freight HSR line along the coast of Fujian and Guangdong via Zhangzhou, Shantou & Huizhou.	250	502	2007-11-23	2013-12-28

== Station list ==
Station	Chinese	Distance (km)	Prefecture	Province	Metro transfers
Hangzhou East	杭州东		Hangzhou	Zhejiang	1 4
Hangzhou South	杭州南		Hangzhou	Zhejiang	5
Shaoxing North	绍兴北		Shaoxing	Zhejiang	
Shaoxing East	绍兴东		Shaoxing	Zhejiang	
Yuyao North	余慈		Ningbo	Zhejiang	
Zhuangqiao	庄桥		Ningbo	Zhejiang	
Ningbo	宁波		Ningbo	Zhejiang	2 4
Ningbo East	宁波东		Ningbo	Zhejiang	
Fenghua	奉化		Ningbo	Zhejiang	
Ninghai	宁海		Ningbo	Zhejiang	
Sanmen	三门		Taizhou	Zhejiang	
Linhai	临海		Taizhou	Zhejiang	
Taizhou	台州		Taizhou	Zhejiang	
Taizhou South	台州南		Taizhou	Zhejiang	
Wenling	温岭		Taizhou	Zhejiang	
Yandangshan	雁荡山		Wenzhou	Zhejiang	
Shenfang	绅坊		Wenzhou	Zhejiang	
Yueqing	乐清		Wenzhou	Zhejiang	
Yongjia	永嘉		Wenzhou	Zhejiang	
Wenzhou South	温州南		Wenzhou	Zhejiang	
Rui'an	瑞安		Wenzhou	Zhejiang	
Aojiang	鳌江		Wenzhou	Zhejiang	
Pingyang	平阳		Wenzhou	Zhejiang	
Cangnan	苍南		Wenzhou	Zhejiang	
Fuding	福鼎		Ningde	Fujian	
Taimushan	太姥山		Ningde	Fujian	
Xiapu	霞浦		Ningde	Fujian	
Fu'an	福安		Ningde	Fujian	
Ningde	宁德		Ningde	Fujian	
Luoyuan	罗源		Fuzhou	Fujian	
Lianjiang	连江		Fuzhou	Fujian	
Mawei	马尾		Fuzhou	Fujian	
Fuzhou South	福州南		Fuzhou	Fujian	1 5
Fuqing	福清		Fuzhou	Fujian	
Yuxi	渔溪		Fuzhou	Fujian	
Hanjiang	涵江		Putian	Fujian	
Putian	莆田		Putian	Fujian	
Fengting	枫亭		Putian	Fujian	
Hui'an West	惠安西		Quanzhou	Fujian	
Quanzhou	泉州		Quanzhou	Fujian	
Jinjiang	晋江		Quanzhou	Fujian	
Xiang'an	翔安		Xiamen	Fujian	
Xiamen North	厦门北		Xiamen	Fujian	1 4 BRT
Xinglin	杏林		Xiamen	Fujian	
Xiamen Gaoqi	厦门高崎		Xiamen	Fujian	
Xiamen	厦门		Xiamen	Fujian	3 R3
Qianchang	前场		Xiamen	Fujian	
Jiaomei	角美		Zhangzhou	Fujian	
Zhangzhou	漳州		Zhangzhou	Fujian	
Zhangpu	漳浦		Zhangzhou	Fujian	
Yunxiao	云霄		Zhangzhou	Fujian	
Zhao'an	诏安		Zhangzhou	Fujian	
Raoping	饶平		Chaozhou	Guangdong	
Chaoshan	潮汕		Chaozhou	Guangdong	
Chaoyang	潮阳		Shantou	Guangdong	
Puning	普宁		Jieyang	Guangdong	
Kuitan	葵潭		Jieyang	Guangdong	
Lufeng	陆丰		Shanwei	Guangdong	
Shanwei	汕尾		Shanwei	Guangdong	
Houmen	鲘门		Shanwei	Guangdong	
Huidong	惠东		Huizhou	Guangdong	
Huizhou South	惠州南		Huizhou	Guangdong	
Shenzhen Pingshan	深圳坪山		Shenzhen	Guangdong	
Shenzhen North	深圳北		Shenzhen	Guangdong	4 5 6

== See also ==
- High-speed rail in China
