= Coastal corridor =

High-speed railway corridor in China

Coastal corridor 沿海通道

Overview
- Status: Partly operational
- Locale: People's Republic of China
- Termini: Dandong; Fangchenggang

Service
- Type: High-speed rail
- Operator: China Railway High-speed

Technical
- Track gauge: 1,435 mm (4 ft 8 1/2 in) standard gauge
- Electrification: 50 Hz 25 kV AC
- Operating speed: 200 to 350 km/h (124 to 217 mph)

The Coastal corridor is a high-speed rail corridor running along the eastern coast of China, stretching from Dalian in the north to Fangchenggang in the south and passing through the cities of Shenyang, Qinhuangdao, Tianjin, Dongying, Weifang, Qingdao, Lianyungang, Yancheng, Nantong, Shanghai, Ningbo. Fuzhou, Xiamen, Shenzhen, and Zhanjiang. The Weifang–Qingdao stretch splits into two, one directly connecting Weifang to Qingdao, the other connecting Weifang to Qingdao through Yantai. As part of China's "Eight Vertical and Eight Horizontal" network, announced in 2016, this corridor is an extension of the Hangzhou–Fuzhou–Shenzhen passenger railway from "Four Vertical and Four Horizontal" network. The line will comprise a mixture of high-speed railway lines, upgraded conventional rail lines and intercity railways.

== Route ==
=== Dalian (Dandong) — Qinhuangdao — Tianjin — Dongying — Weifang — Qingdao (Yantai) — Lianyungang — Yancheng — Nantong Section ===
Name	Route	Design speed (km/h)	Length (km)	Status	Construction start date	Open date	Remarks
Dandong–Dalian intercity railway	Dandong – Dalian	200	293	open	17 March 2010	17 December 2015	
Harbin–Dalian high-speed railway	Dalian – Shenyang North	350	383	open	23 August 2007	1 December 2012	
Qinhuangdao–Shenyang passenger railway	Shenyang North – Qinhuangdao	250	393	open	16 August 1999	12 October 2003	Part of Beijing–Harbin railway
Second Qinhuangdao-Shenyang high-speed railway	Shenyang West — Qinhuangdao North	350	409	being planned			Connects to Shenyang North via the Beijing–Shenyang HSR
Tianjin–Qinhuangdao high-speed railway	Qinhuangdao – Binhai	350	223	open	8 November 2008	1 December 2013	Connects to Binhai via Beijing–Tianjin ICR
Tianjin–Weifang high-speed railway	Binhai – Weifang North.	350 (expected)	354	under construction	31 December 2022	2026 (expected)	Also part of Beijing−Shanghai east route.
Weifang–Yantai high-speed railway	Weifang North – Yantai South	350	236	open	31 October 2020	21 October 2024	
Jinan–Qingdao high-speed railway	Weifang North – Qingdao North	350	117	open	11 August 2015	26 December 2018	
Qingdao–Rongcheng intercity railway	Qingdao North – Yantai South.	250	186	open	10 October 2010	16 November 2016	
Qingdao–Yancheng railway	Qingdao North – Lianyungang – Yancheng.	200	429	open	26 December 2010	26 December 2018	
Yancheng–Nantong high-speed railway	Yancheng – Nantong West	350	157	open	16 January 2018	29 December 2020	Connects to Nantong–Suzhou–Jiaxing–Ningbo HSR at Nantong West

=== Existing route: Nantong—Shanghai—Ningbo—Fuzhou—Xiamen—Shenzhen—Zhanjiang section ===
Name		Route	Design speed (km/h)	Length (km)	Status	Construction start date	Open date	Remarks
Shanghai–Suzhou–Nantong railway		Nantong West – Anting West	200	123	open	1 March 2014	1 July 2020	Connecting to Shanghai Hongqiao
Shanghai–Hangzhou high-speed railway		Shanghai Hongqiao – Hangzhou East	350	159	open	26 February 2009	26 October 2010	
Hangzhou–Fuzhou–Shenzhen railway	Hangzhou–Ningbo high-speed railway	Hangzhou East – Ningbo	350	152	open	19 March 2009	1 July 2013	
Hangzhou–Fuzhou–Shenzhen railway	Ningbo–Taizhou–Wenzhou railway	Ningbo – Taizhou West – Wenzhou South	250	279	open	27 October 2005	28 September 2009	
Hangzhou–Fuzhou–Shenzhen railway	Wenzhou–Fuzhou railway	Wenzhou South – Fuzhou South	250	298	open	26 August 2005	28 September 2009	
Hangzhou–Fuzhou–Shenzhen railway	Fuzhou–Xiamen railway	Fuzhou South – Xiamen North	250	226	open	30 September 2005	26 April 2010	
Hangzhou–Fuzhou–Shenzhen railway	Xiamen–Shenzhen railway	Xiamen North – Shenzhen North	250	514	open	23 November 2007	28 December 2013	
Shenzhen–Zhanjiang high-speed railway	Shenzhen–Jiangmen railway	Shenzhen North/Xili – Jiangmen	250	116	under construction	2 July 2020	2028 (expected)	
Shenzhen–Zhanjiang high-speed railway	Jiangmen–Maoming railway	Jiangmen – Maoming	200	268	open	28 June 2014	1 July 2018	
Shenzhen–Zhanjiang high-speed railway	Maoming–Zhanjiang railway	Maoming – Zhanjiang West	200	103	open	21 March 2009	28 December 2013	

=== New route: Nantong—Ningbo—Fuzhou—Xiamen—Guangzhou (Shenzhen)—Zhanjiang section ===
Name		Route	Design speed (km/h)	Length (km)	Status	Construction start date	Open date	Remarks
Nantong–Suzhou–Jiaxing–Ningbo high-speed railway		Nantong West – Ningbo West	350 (expected)	310	under construction	30 November 2022	2027 (expected)	
Ningbo–Guangzhou high-speed railway	Ningbo–Taizhou–Wenzhou high-speed railway	Ningbo West – Taizhou — Wenzhou East	350 (expected)	307	being planned			
Ningbo–Guangzhou high-speed railway	Wenzhou–Fuzhou high-speed railway	Wenzhou East – Fuzhou South	350 (expected)	284	under construction	September 2025	2030 (expected)	
Ningbo–Guangzhou high-speed railway	Fuzhou–Xiamen high-speed railway high-speed railway	Fuzhou South – Xiamen North — Zhangzhou	350	277	open	15 January 2017	28 September 2023	
Ningbo–Guangzhou high-speed railway	Zhangzhou–Shantou high-speed railway	Zhangzhou – Shantou	350 (expected)	176	under construction	4 February 2024	2028 (expected)	
Ningbo–Guangzhou high-speed railway	Shantou–Shanwei high-speed railway	Shantou – Shanwei	350	162	open	26 December 2018	26 December 2023	
Ningbo–Guangzhou high-speed railway	Guangzhou–Shanwei high-speed railway	Shanwei – Guangzhou East	350	241	partly open	5 July 2017	26 September 2023 (partially)	Trains currently run over the Guangshen railway to Guangzhou
Guangzhou–Zhanjiang high-speed railway		Guangzhou – Zhanjiang North	350	400	open	30 September 2019	22 December 2025	
Shenzhen–Shanwei high-speed railway		Shenshan – Xili	350 (expected)	125	under constructions	4 January 2021	2027 (expected)	

=== Zhanjiang–Beihai–Fangchenggang–Dongxing section ===
Name	Route	Design speed (km/h)	Length (km)	Status	Construction start date	Open date	Remarks
Hepu–Zhanjiang railway	Zhanjiang West – Hepu	350 (expected)	137	under constructions	29 December 2024	2028 (expected)	Shared route with Baotou (Yinchuan)–Hainan corridor
Qinzhou–Beihai high-speed railway	Hepu – Qinzhou East	250	67	open	23 June 2009	30 December 2013	
Qinzhou–Fangchenggang railway	Qinzhou North – Fangchenggang North	250	62	open	1 April 2010	30 December 2013	
Fangchenggang–Dongxing railway	Fangchenggang North – Dongxingshi	200	47	open	15 March 2019	27 December 2023	

== See also ==
- High-speed rail in China
- Hangzhou–Fuzhou–Shenzhen passenger-dedicated railway
