= Jinjiang railway station =

Railway station in Quanzhou, China

Jinjiang 晋江
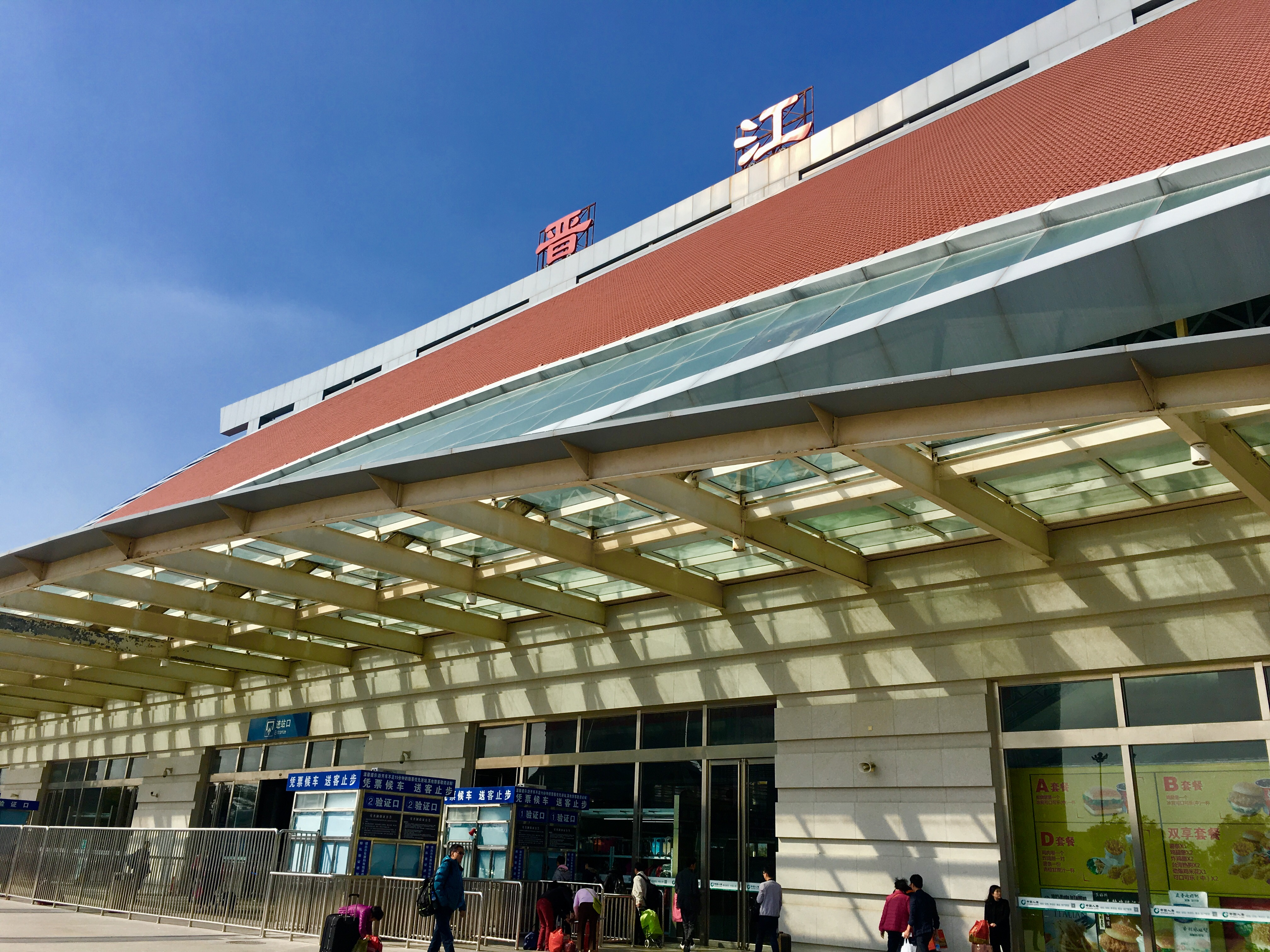

General information
- Location: Jinjiang, Quanzhou, Fujian; China
- Coordinates: 24°47′51″N 118°27′14″E
- Operated by: China Railway Nanchang Group, China Railway Corporation
- Line: Fuzhou–Xiamen railway
Location

Jinjiang railway station (Chinese: 晋江站) is a railway station in Jinjiang, Quanzhou, Fujian Province, People's Republic of China, on the Fuzhou–Xiamen railway which is operated by China Railway Nanchang Group, China Railway Corporation.

Preceding station	China Railway High-speed	Following station
Quanzhou towards Fuzhou South	Fuzhou–Xiamen railway	Xiamen North towards Xiamen
