= Hanjiang railway station =

Rail station in Putain City, China

Coordinates: 25.49220°N 119.17583°E

Hanjiang 涵江
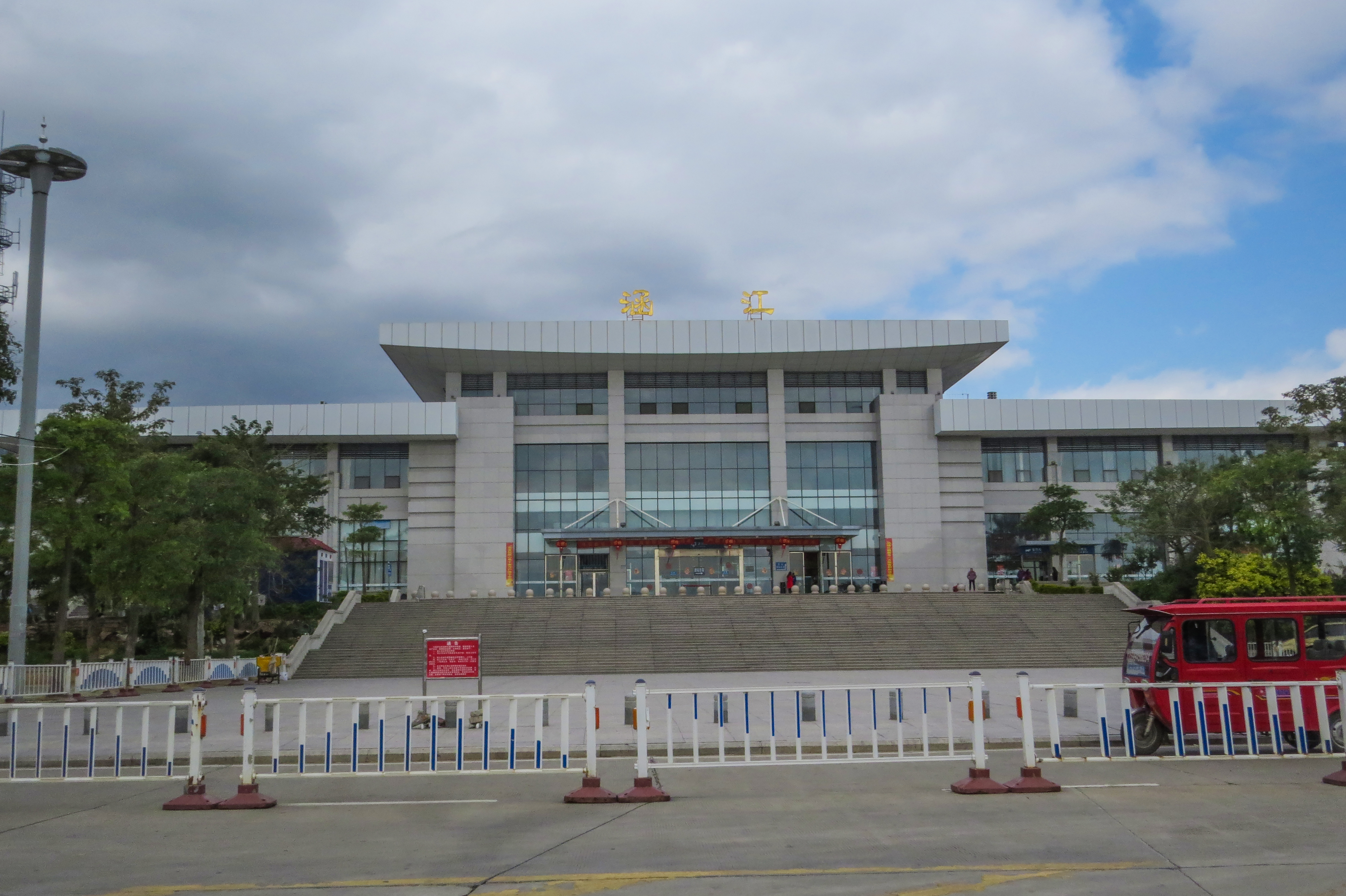
- Hanjiang Railway Station

General information
- Location: Putian, Fujian; China
- Operator: Nanchang Railway Bureau, China Railway Corporation
- Line: Fuzhou–Xiamen railway
Location

Hanjiang railway station (Chinese: 涵江站) is a railway station located in the Hanjiang District of Putian City, Fujian Province, China, on the Fuzhou–Xiamen railway operated by the Nanchang Railway Bureau, China Railway Corporation.

Preceding station	China Railway High-speed	Following station
Fuqing towards Fuzhou South	Fuzhou–Xiamen railway	Putian towards Xiamen
