= Hui'an railway station =

Railway station in Quanzhou, China

Hui'an 惠安
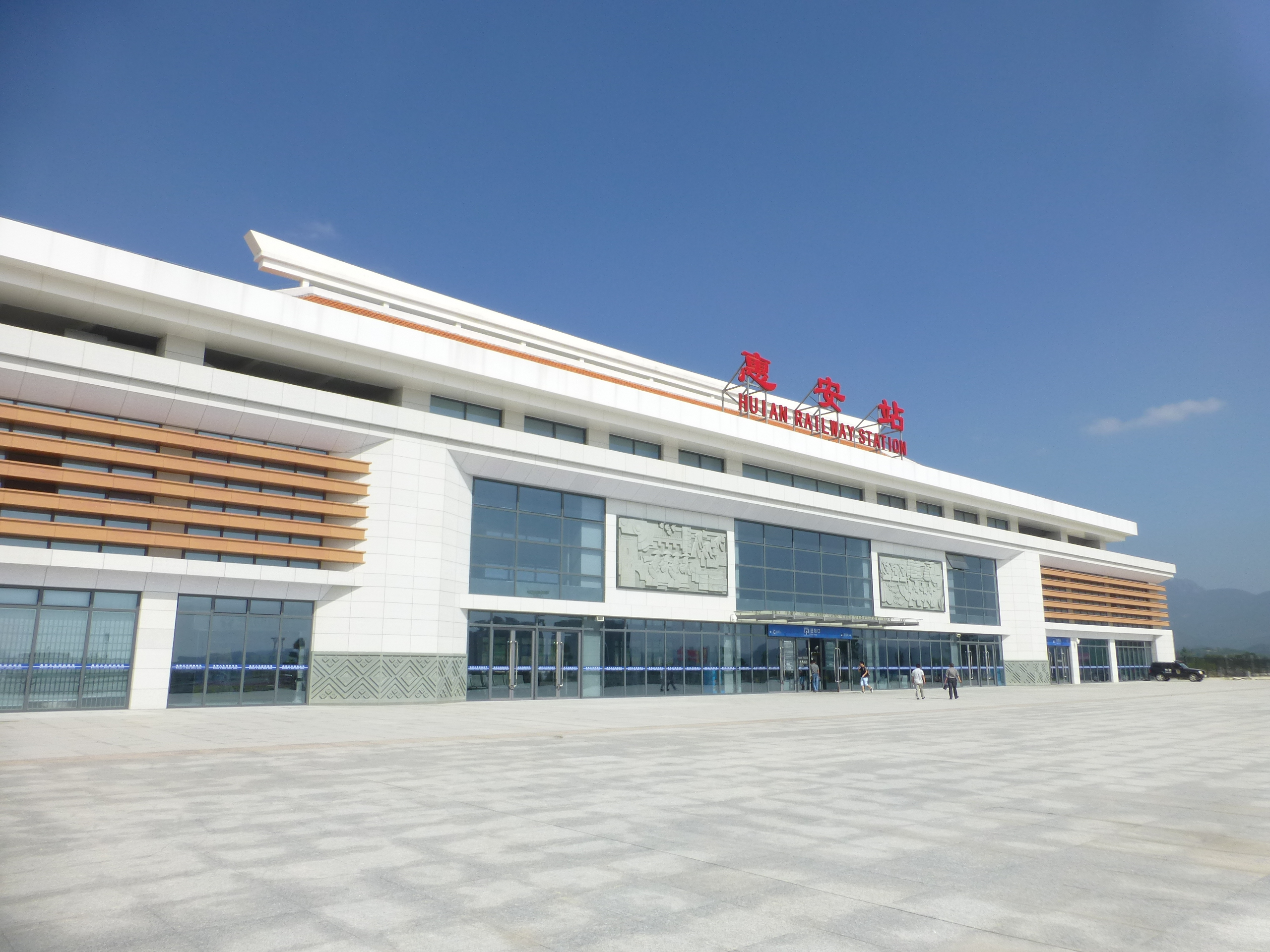

General information
- Location: Zishan Town, Hui'an County, Quanzhou, Fujian; China
- Coordinates: 25.0606°N 118.7094°E
- Operated by: China Railway Nanchang Group, China Railway Corporation
- Line(s): Fuzhou–Xiamen railway

Hui'an railway station (Chinese: 惠安站) is a railway station located in Hui'an County, Quanzhou, Fujian Province, China, on the Fuzhou–Xiamen railway operated by the China Railway Nanchang Group, China Railway Corporation.

In early design documents the station have been referred to as "Hui'an West railway station" (Chinese: 惠安西站).

Preceding station	China Railway High-speed	Following station
Xianyou towards Fuzhou South	Fuzhou–Xiamen railway	Quanzhou towards Xiamen
