= Putian railway station =

Railway station in Putian, Fujian, China

Coordinates: 25.35089°N 119.06401°E

Putian 莆田
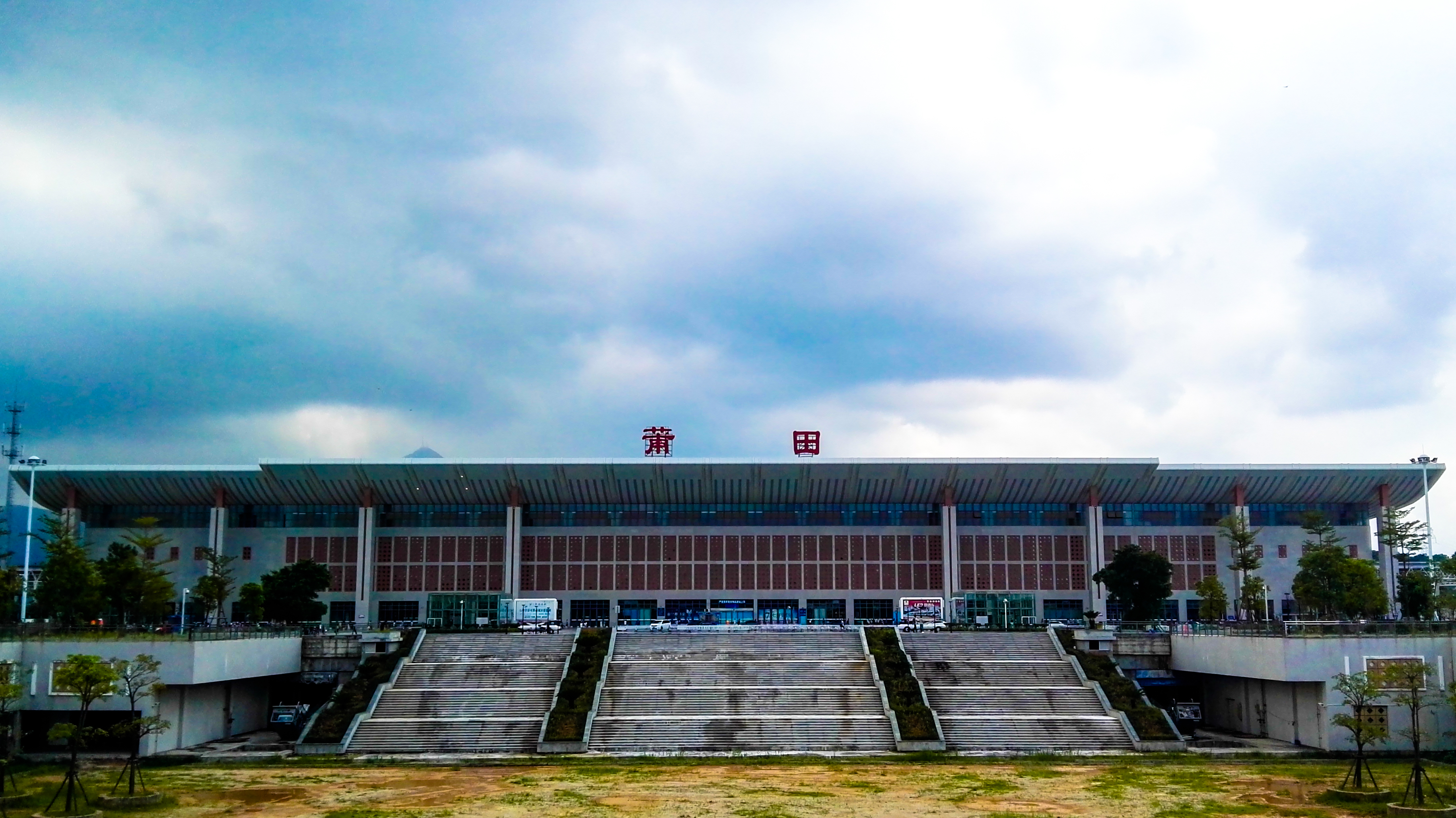

General information
- Location: Putian, Fujian; China
- Operated by: Nanchang Railway Bureau, China Railway Corporation
- Line(s): Fuzhou–Xiamen railway; Xiangtang–Putian railway; Dongwu line (freight only)

History
- Opened: 26 April 2010

Putian railway station (Chinese: 莆田站) is a railway station located in Putian, Fujian Province, China, on the Fuzhou-Xiamen railway. The station is operated by the Nanchang Railway Bureau, China Railway Corporation. It opened on 26 April 2010.

It is a stop in the Fuzhou–Xiamen high-speed railway.

Preceding station	China Railway High-speed	Following station
Hanjiang towards Fuzhou South	Fuzhou–Xiamen railway	Xianyou towards Xiamen
Yongtai towards Nanchang West	Xiangtang–Putian railway	Terminus
