= Xianyou railway station =

Railway station in Putian, China

Coordinates: 25.23724°N 118.86269°E

Xianyou 仙游
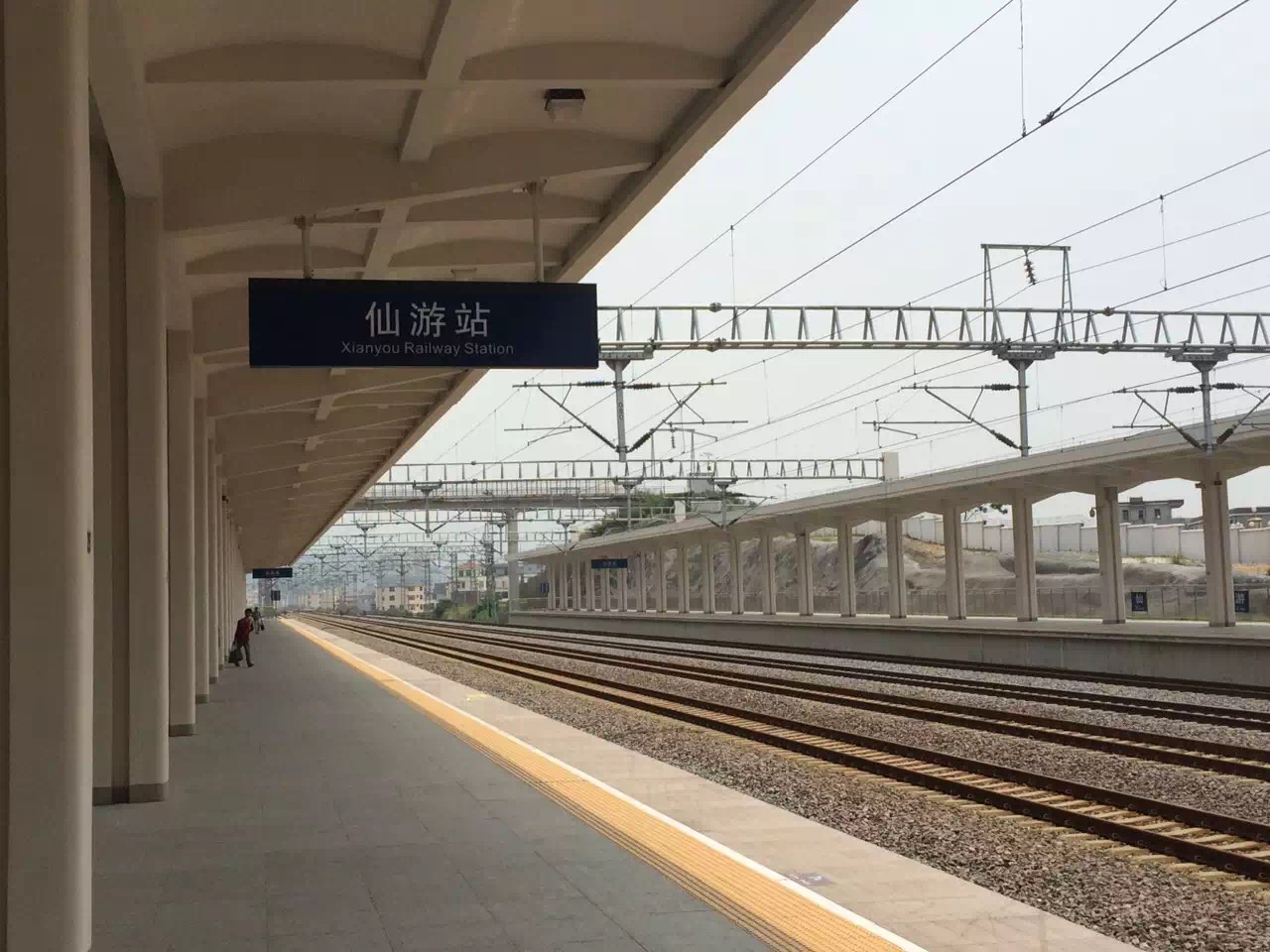
- Station Platform

General information
- Location: Xianyou County, Putian, Fujian; China
- Operated by: Nanchang Railway Bureau, China Railway Corporation
- Line(s): Fuzhou–Xiamen railway

Other information
- Station code: TMIS: 34166; Telegraph: XWS; Pinyin: XYO

Xianyou railway station (Chinese: 仙游站) is a railway station located in Xianyou County, Putian City, Fujian Province, China, on the Fuzhou–Xiamen railway operated by the Nanchang Railway Bureau, China Railway Corporation.

Preceding station	China Railway High-speed	Following station
Putian towards Fuzhou South	Fuzhou–Xiamen railway	Hui'an towards Xiamen
