= Fuqing railway station =

Railway station in Fuqing, China

Coordinates: 25.67566°N 119.38387°E

Fuqing 福清
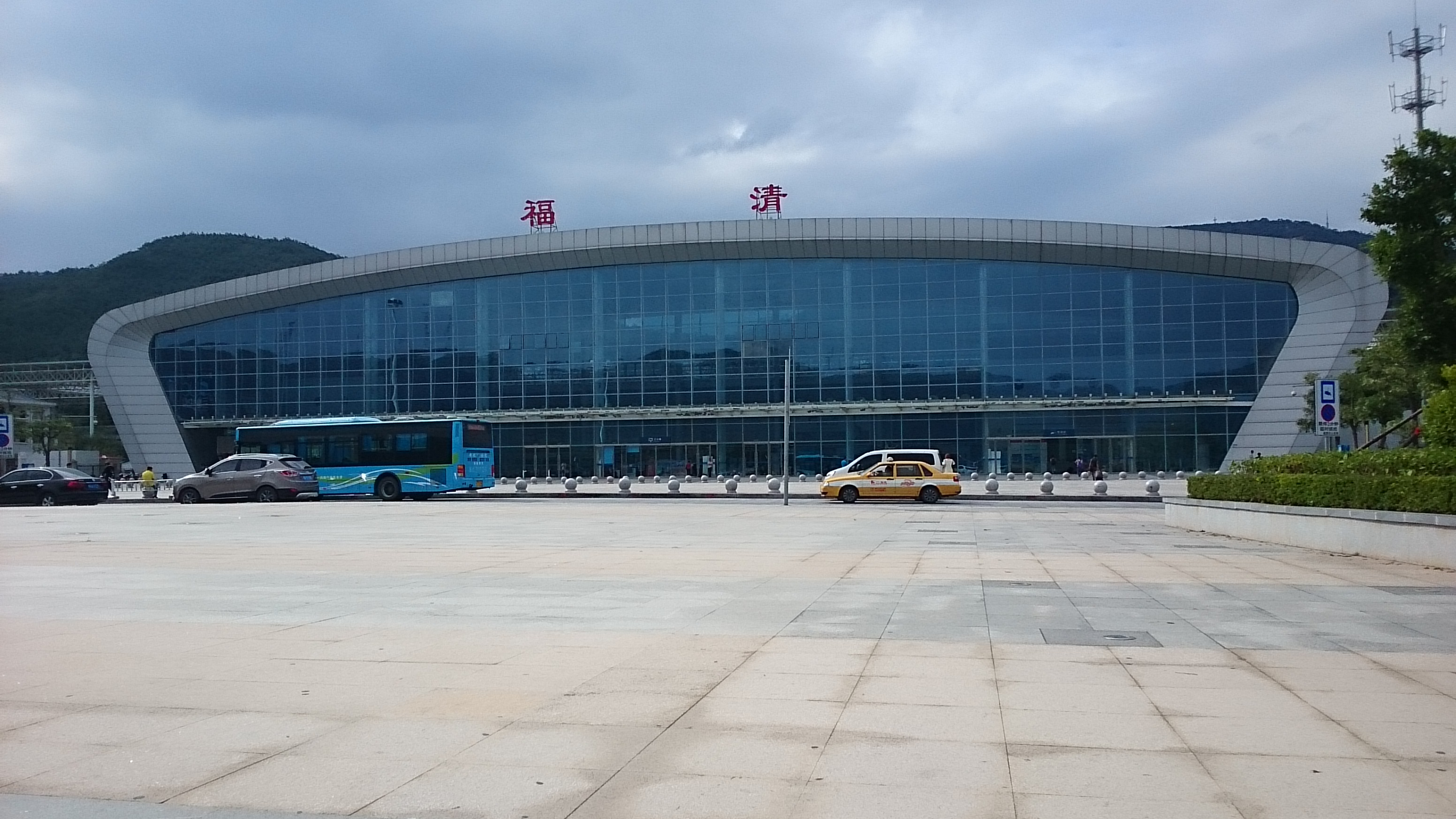

General information
- Location: Fuqing, Fujian; China
- Operated by: Nanchang Railway Bureau, China Railway Corporation
- Line(s): Fuzhou–Xiamen railway

Fuqing railway station (Chinese: 福清站) is a railway station located in Fuqing City, Fujian Province, China, on the Fuzhou–Xiamen railway operated by the Nanchang Railway Bureau, China Railway Corporation.

Preceding station	China Railway High-speed	Following station
Fuzhou South Terminus	Fuzhou–Xiamen railway	Hanjiang towards Xiamen
