= Quanzhou railway station =

Railway station in Quanzhou, China

Coordinates: 24°58′36″N 118°33′47″E

Quanzhou 泉州
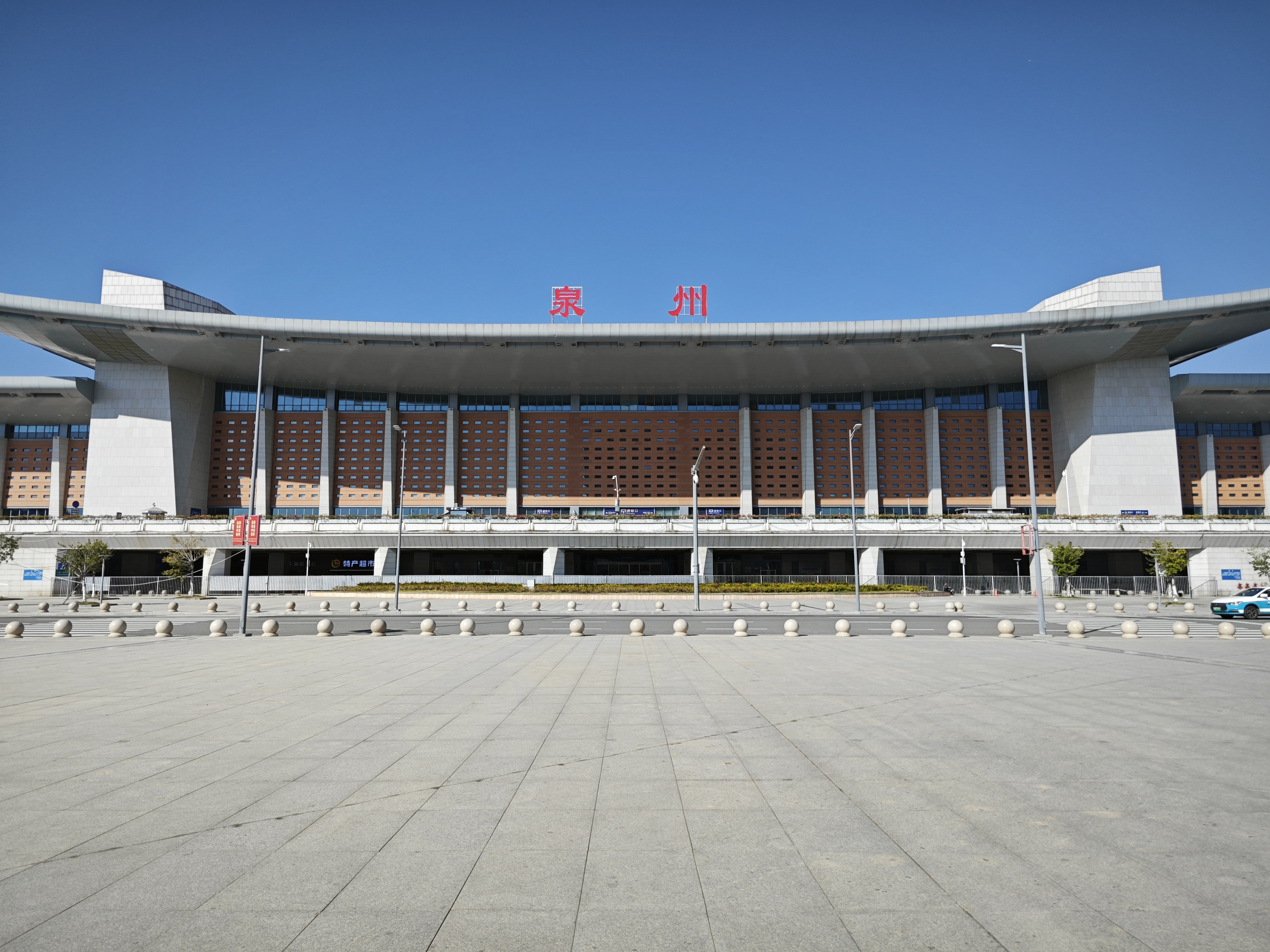

General information
- Location: Fengze District, Quanzhou, Fujian; China
- Operated by: China Railway Nanchang Group, China Railway Corporation
- Lines: Fuzhou–Xiamen railway Xingguo–Quanzhou railway (under construction)

History
- Opened: April 26, 2010
Location

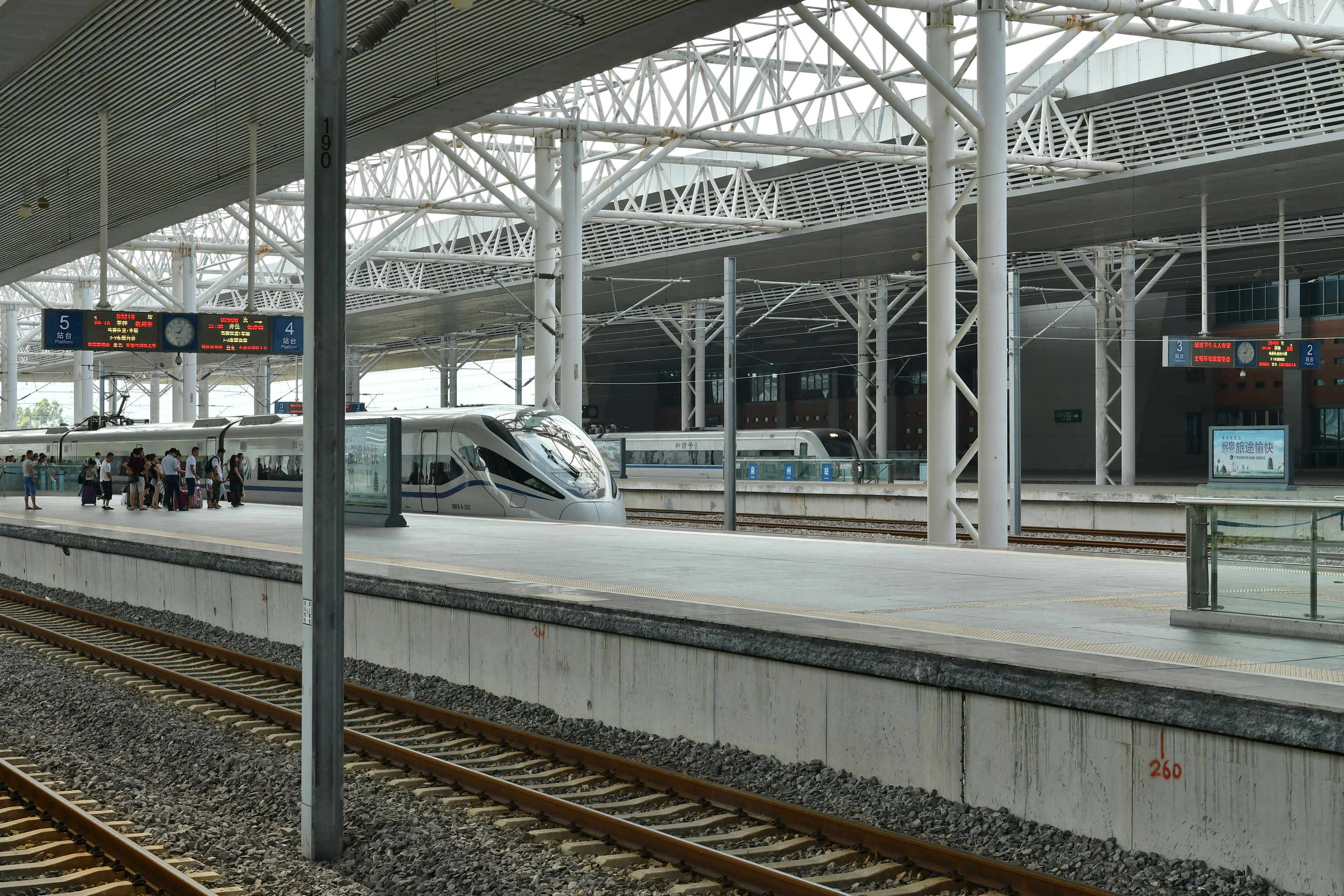
Quanzhou railway station platform

Quanzhou railway station is located in Fengze District, Quanzhou, Fujian Province, People's Republic of China, on the Fuzhou–Xiamen railway which is operated by China Railway Nanchang Group, China Railway Corporation. It opened on 26 April 2010.

== Nearby bus station ==
Quanzhou North bus station is located beside the railway station. Construction began in 2017 and it opened in 2019.

== Other railway stations in Quanzhou ==
The older Quanzhou East railway station, served by conventional (not high-speed) trains, closed on December 9, 2014, a few years after the opening of the new Quanzhou railway station.

Preceding station	China Railway High-speed	Following station
Hui'an towards Fuzhou South	Fuzhou–Xiamen railway	Jinjiang towards Xiamen
