= Xinglin railway station =

Railway station in China

Coordinates: 24.5710°N 118.0622°E

Xinglin 杏林站
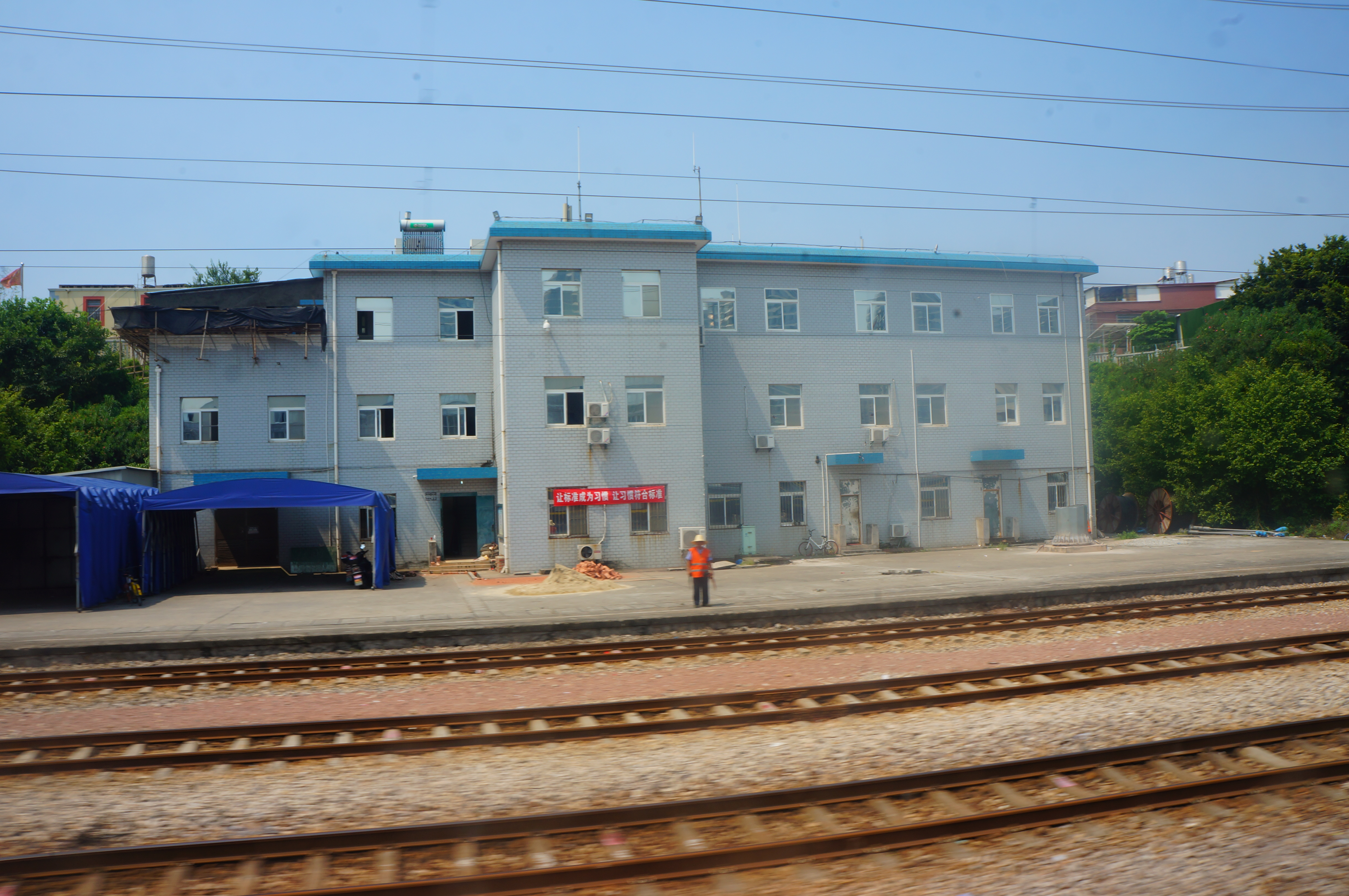

General information
- Location: Xiamen, Fujian; China
- Operated by: Nanchang Railway Bureau, China Railway Corporation
- Line: Fuzhou-Xiamen Railway

Xinglin railway station (Chinese: 杏林站) is a railway station located in Xinglin Village, Jimei District of Xiamen, Fujian Province, China, on the Fuzhou-Xiamen Railway line. The original station was built in 1956.
