= Yuxi railway station =

Yuxi railway station may refer to:

- Yuxi railway station (Yunnan), on the Kunming–Yuxi–Hekou railway and Yuxi–Mohan railway
- Yuxi railway station (Fujian), a planned station
- Yuxi railway station (Hubei), on the Jiaozuo–Liuzhou railway
