= Gao Qi =

Gao Qi may refer to:

- Northern Qi (550–577), also known as Gao Qi, short-lived Chinese dynasty
- Gao Qi (Ming dynasty) (1336–1374), early Ming dynasty writer
- Gao Qi (musician) (born 1968), Chinese rock musician

== See also ==
- Gaoqi (disambiguation)
