= Xiang'an railway station =

Proposed railway station in Xiamen, China

Coordinates: 24.6910°N 118.308°E

Xiang'an 翔安

General information
- Location: Xiang'an District, Xiamen, Fujian; China
- Operated by: Nanchang Railway Bureau, China Railway Corporation
- Line(s): Fuzhou-Xiamen Railway

Xiang'an railway station (Chinese: 翔安站; pinyin: Xiáng'ān zhàn) is a not-yet-constructed railway station planned to be located in the Xiang'an District of Xiamen City, Fujian Province, China, on the Fuzhou-Xiamen Railway operated by the Nanchang Railway Bureau, China Railway Corporation.

== Construction ==
Currently the station has not been constructed but conditions for construction have been reserved.
