= Zhanglin railway station =

Railway station in Fujian, China

Zhanglin 樟林站
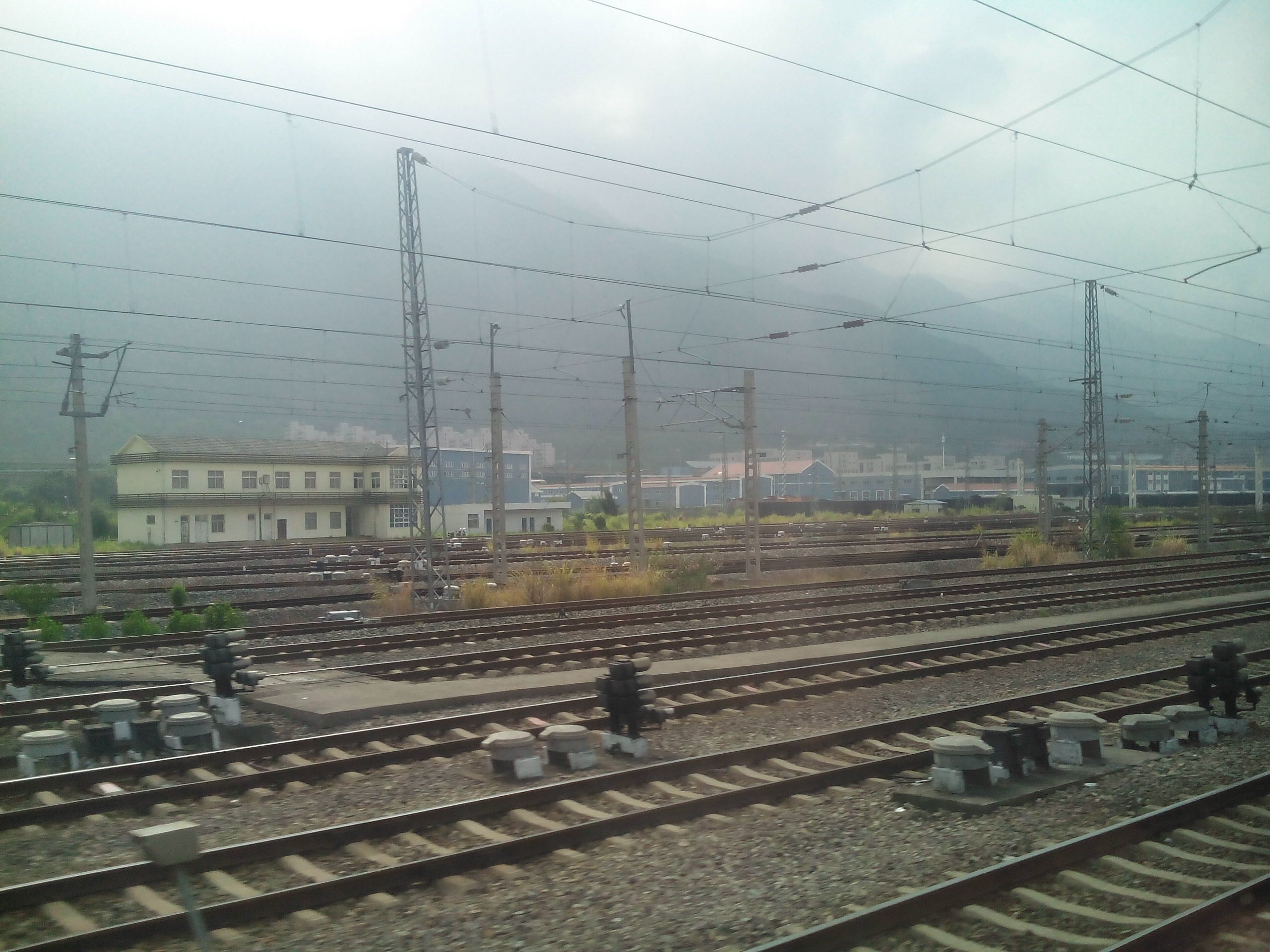

General information
- Location: Zhanglin, Gushan, Jin'an District, Fuzhou, Fujian; China
- Coordinates: 26.084722°N 119.361111°E
- Operated by: CR Nanchang
- Lines: Fuzhou–Mawei railway Fuzhou–Xiamen railway

History
- Opened: 1971
Location

Zhanglin railway station (Chinese: 樟林站; pinyin: Zhānglín zhàn; Foochow Romanized: Ciŏng-lìng câng) is a railway station located in Gushan (鼓山镇; Gǔshān Zhèn), Jin'an District (晋安区; Jìn'ān Qū), in the northeast of the city of Fuzhou, Fujian, China.

Built in 1971, it is currently the site of the Fuzhou Depot of Nanchang Railway Bureau. It holds the largest classification yard on the Wenzhou-Fuzhou Railway, having undergone a major station upgrade with the construction of the line. This was marked by the first freight train departure on the new line from this station on the 30th June 2009. It is the largest freight station in Fujian, and handles no passenger services.

A project to reduce congestion and to prevent freight services from entering the urban area of Fuzhou has been planned with Zhanglin station as a major hub.

== See also ==
- Fuzhou railway station
