= Qianchang railway station =

Railway station in Xiamen, China

Coordinates: 24.5950°N 118.0132°E

Qianchang 前场站
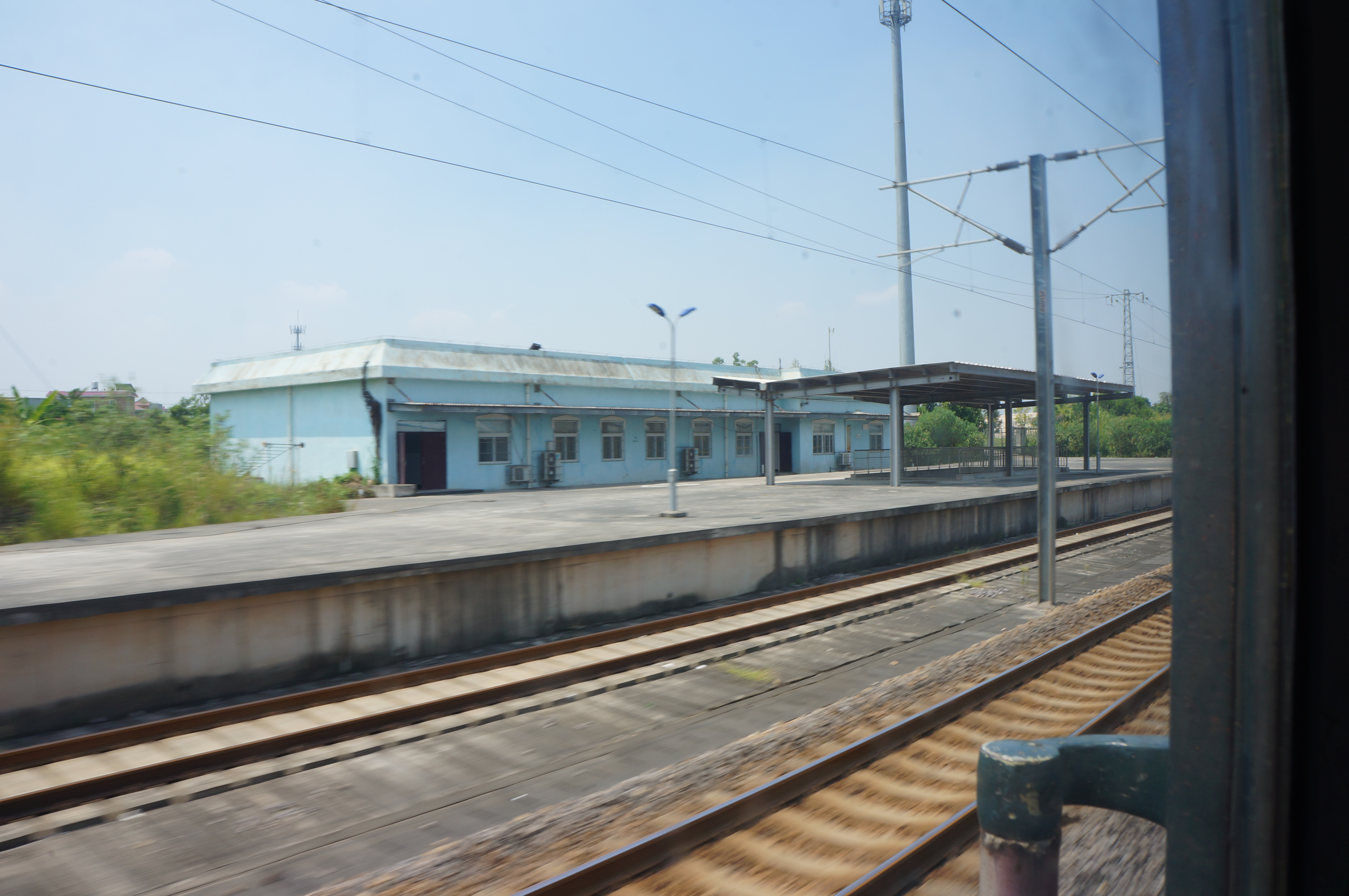

General information
- Location: Jimei District, Xiamen, Fujian; China
- Operated by: Nanchang Railway Bureau, China Railway Corporation
- Line(s): Xiamen-Shenzhen Railway

Qianchang railway station (Chinese: 前场站) is a railway station located in Guankou Town (灌口镇), Jimei District, Xiamen City, Fujian Province, China, on the Xiamen-Shenzhen Railway operated by the Nanchang Railway Bureau, China Railway Corporation.

== Service ==
Currently the station only operates freight trains (and no passenger trains).
