= Gaoqi =

Gaoqi (高崎) may refer to:

- Xiamen Gaoqi International Airport, in Huli District of Xiamen City, Fujian, China
- Xiamen Gaoqi railway station, formerly known as Xiamen North Railway Station, train station in Huli District of Xiamen City, near the above-mentioned airport
- Gaoqi station, a metro station on Line 1 (Xiamen Metro)

== See also ==
- Takasaki (高崎)
