= Dongwu line =

Railway line in Fujian, China

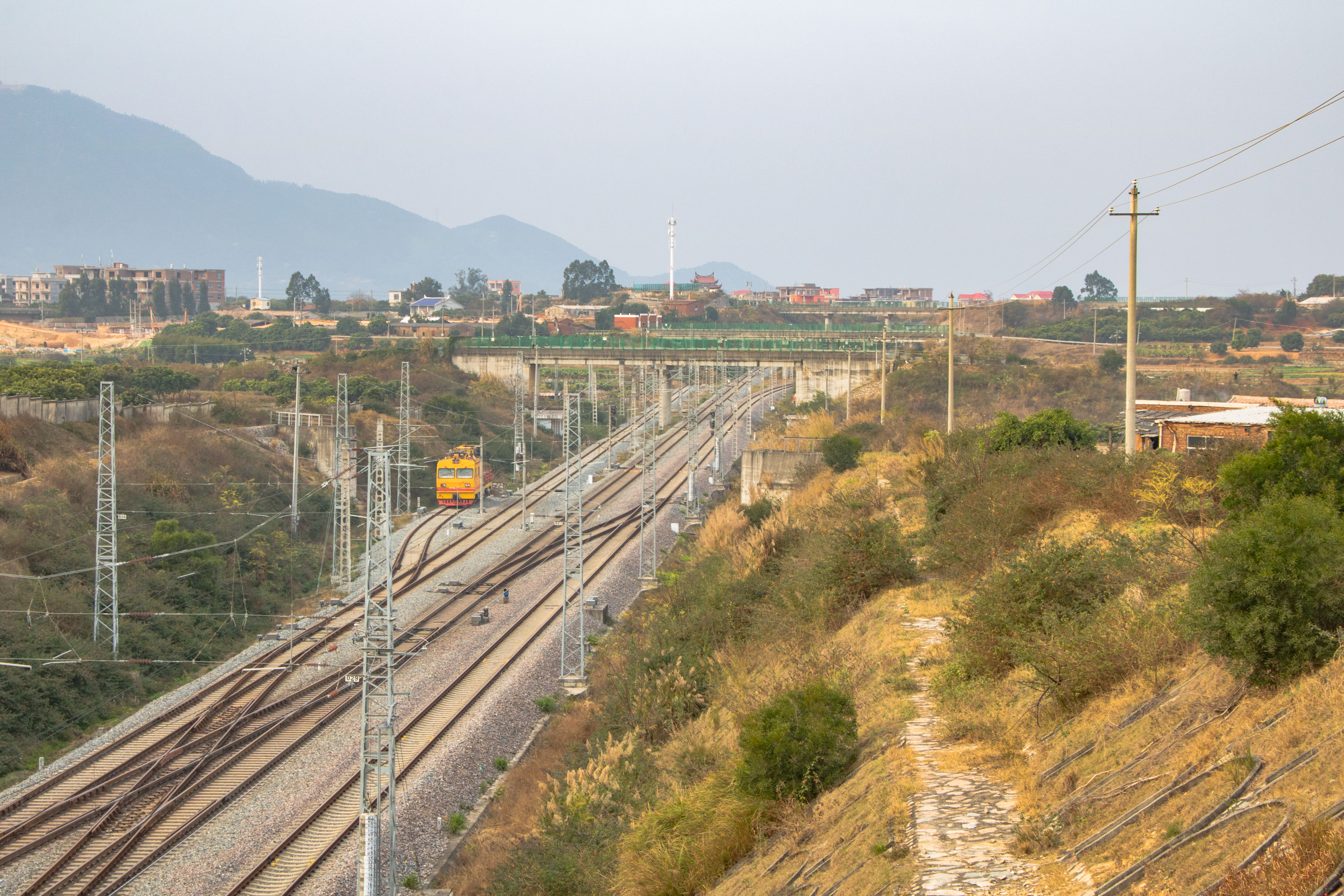
View looking towards the connection to the mainline at Putian railway station.

The Dongwu line is a single-track electrified freight-only railway line from Putian railway station to the Port of Meizhou Bay.

== History ==
Construction began in July 2008. The line opened on 30 December 2013.
