= Mawei railway station =

Railway station in Fuzhou, Fujian, China

Coordinates: 25.98950°N 119.46031°E

Mawei railway station 马尾站
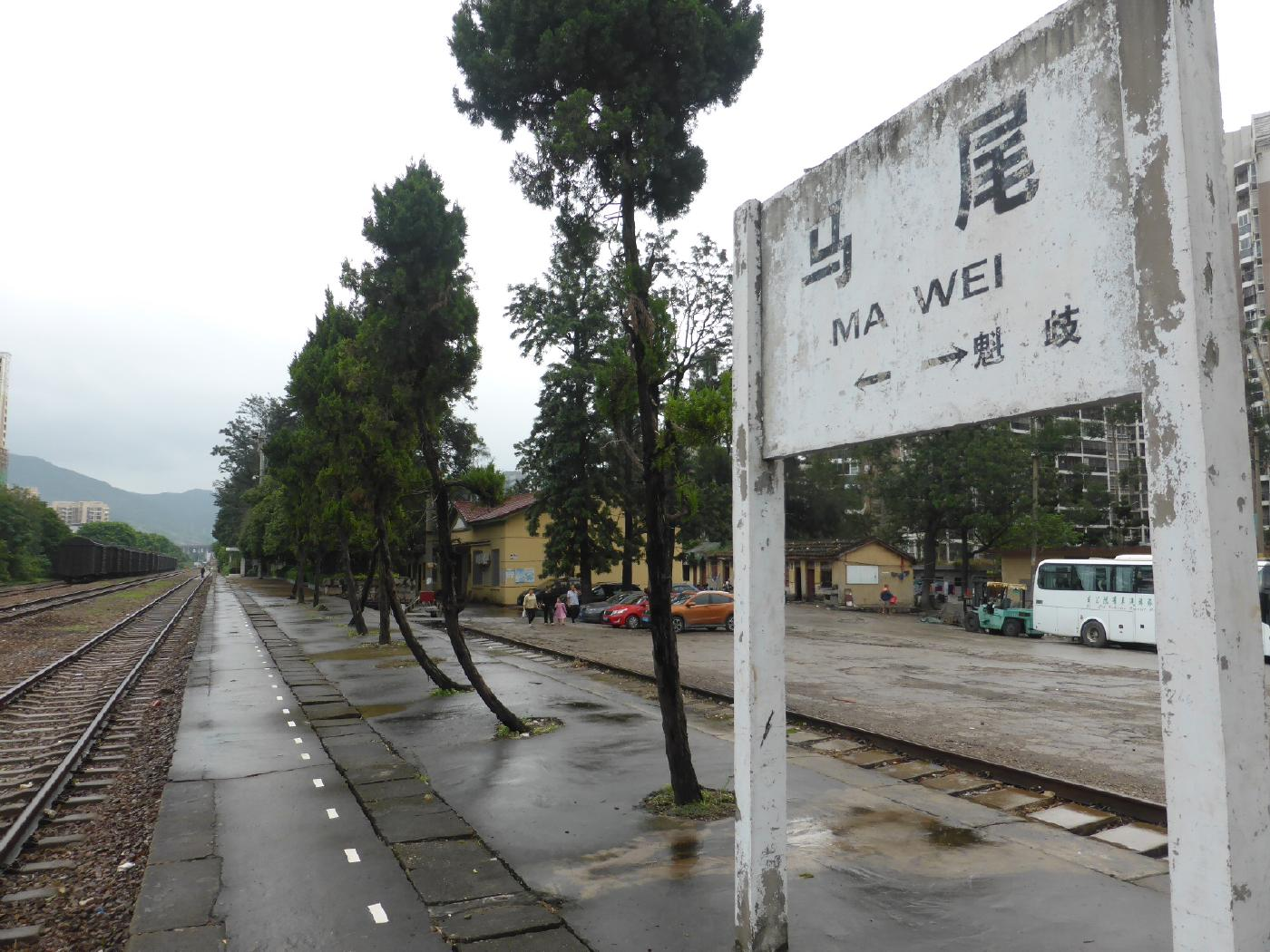

General information
- Location: Fujian; China
- Operated by: Nanchang Railway Bureau, China Railway Corporation
- Line(s): Fuzhou-Mawei railway

Mawei railway station (Chinese: 马尾站) is a railway station located in the Mawei District of Fuzhou, Fujian Province, China, on the Fuzhou-Mawei railway operated by the Nanchang Railway Bureau, China Railway Corporation.
