= Yuxi railway station (Fujian) =

Railway station in Fujian, China

Coordinates: 25.6058°N 119.3288°E

Yuxi 渔溪

General information
- Location: Fuqing, Fuzhou, Fujian Province; China
- Operator: Nanchang Railway Bureau, China Railway Corporation
- Line: Fuzhou–Xiamen Railway
Location

Yuxi railway station (simplified Chinese: 渔溪站; traditional Chinese: 漁溪站; pinyin: Yúxī zhàn) is a railway station located in the county-level city of Fuqing, Fuzhou, Fujian Province, China, on the Fuzhou–Xiamen Railway operated by the Nanchang Railway Bureau, China Railway Corporation.

== Construction ==
Currently this station has not yet been constructed. Conditions for construction have been reserved.
