= Zhangzhou railway station =

Railway station in Zhangzhou, China

Zhangzhou 漳州
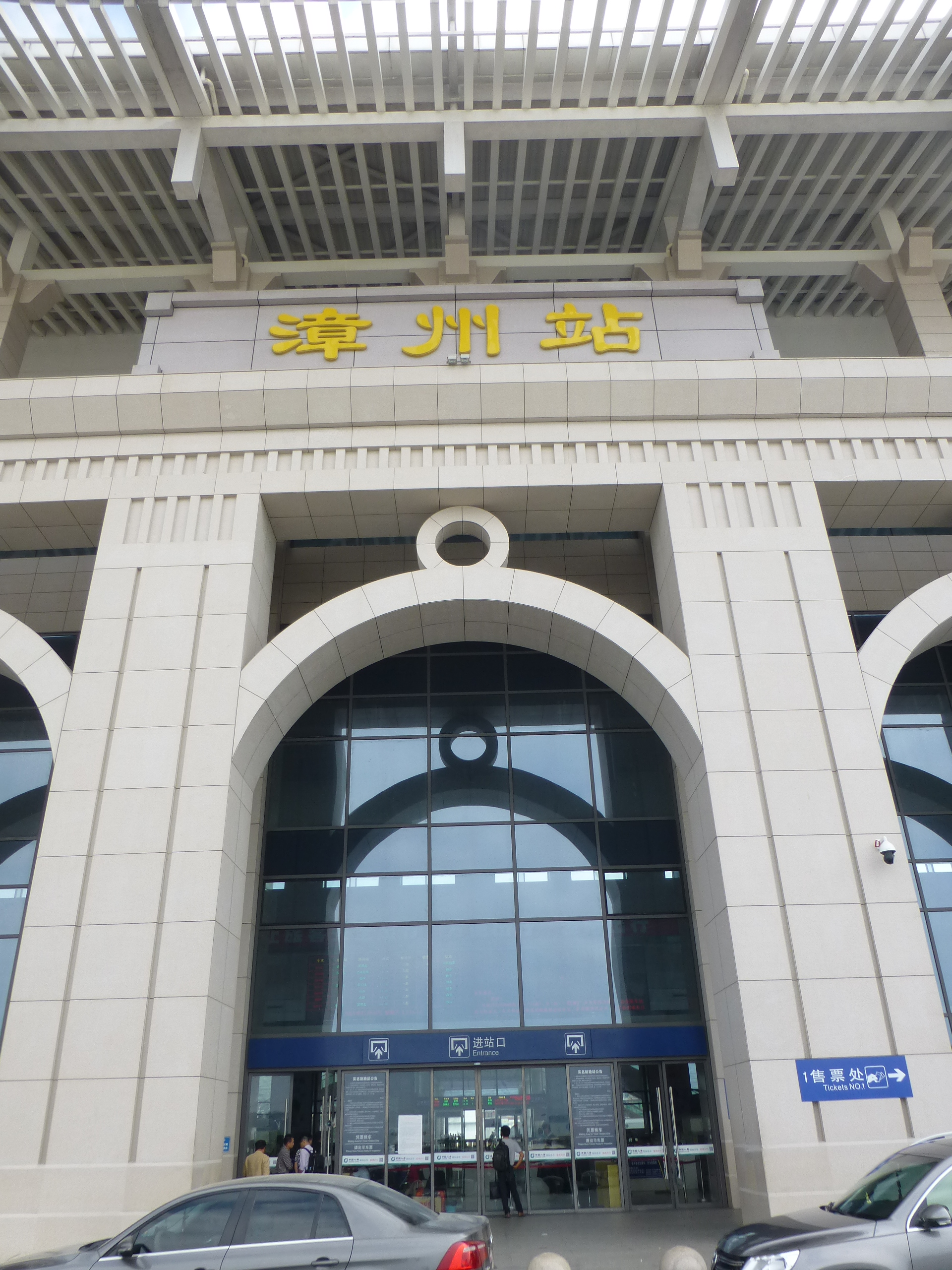

General information
- Location: Hongtang Village (洪塘村), Yancuo Town (颜厝镇), Longhai District, Zhangzhou, Fujian; China
- Coordinates: 24°27′35″N 117°42′39″E
- Operated by: Nanchang Railway Bureau; China Railway Corporation
- Line(s): Xiamen–Shenzhen railway Longyan–Xiamen railway Fuzhou–Xiamen high-speed railway (under construction)
Location

Zhangzhou railway station is the main train station of the Zhangzhou metropolitan area in China's Fujian Province. The station is located in Hongtang Village (洪塘村) of Longhai District, about 10 km south of downtown Zhangzhou. It is located on the common section of the Longxia Railway (Longyan-Xiamen; opened in mid-2012) and the Xiashen Railway (Xiamen-Shenzhen Railway; opened at the end of 2013).

Railway development plans also include the construction of a 45-km-long branch line from Zhangzhou railway station eastward, across most of Longhai District, to terminate at the China Merchants Group industrial area (招商局漳州开发区) on the southwestern shore of Xiamen Harbor, opposite Xiamen Island (24°24′31″N 118°01′037″E). The branch will be known as the Gangwei Railway (港尾铁路), and will support trains running at speeds up to 120 km/h. Its opening is planned for 2013.

== Service ==
Zhangzhou railway station is served by high-speed (D-series) trains traveling along the coast (east, toward Xiamen, Fuzhou, Hangzhou, and Shanghai, and west, toward Shantou and Shenzhen), as well as inland, toward Longyan. A few "conventional" passenger trains, traveling from Xiamen to various points in the interior of the country, stop at Zhangzhou as well.

== History ==
During planning and construction, the station was known as Zhangzhou South railway station, because the name "Zhangzhou Station" was used at the time by another station (see Zhangzhou North railway station below). The station was opened in mid-2012, along with the new Longxia Railway.

== Nearby stations ==
- Zhangzhou East railway station located on the older (1950s) Yingtan–Xiamen Railway, northeast of the city. It was the main train station of the Zhangzhou metropolitan area until the opening of the new Zhangzhou Station. As of 2015, it is used by only a small number of passenger trains.
- Zhangzhou North railway station. It is a freight-only station located in Nankeng St (南坑路) in Xiangcheng District of Zhangzhou, just north of the central city area. It was known as Zhangzhou Station until July 1, 2011, when it was renamed Zhangzhou North, so that the new station could be simply called Zhangzhou. As of October 2012, some maps (e.g., http://map.sogou.com/ ) still label Zhangzhou North Station with its old name, "Zhangzhou Station". This station used to have a very limited passenger service, which has been abolished with the opening of the Longxia Railway and the new Zhangzhou Station.

Preceding station	China Railway	Following station
Nanjing towards Longyan	Longyan–Xiamen railway	Jiaomei towards Xiamen
Preceding station	China Railway High-speed	Following station
Jiaomei towards Xiamen North	Xiamen–Shenzhen railway	Zhangpu towards Shenzhen North
