= Fuzhou–Xiamen high-speed railway =

High-speed rail line in southeastern China

Fuzhou–Xiamen high-speed railway 福厦高速铁路
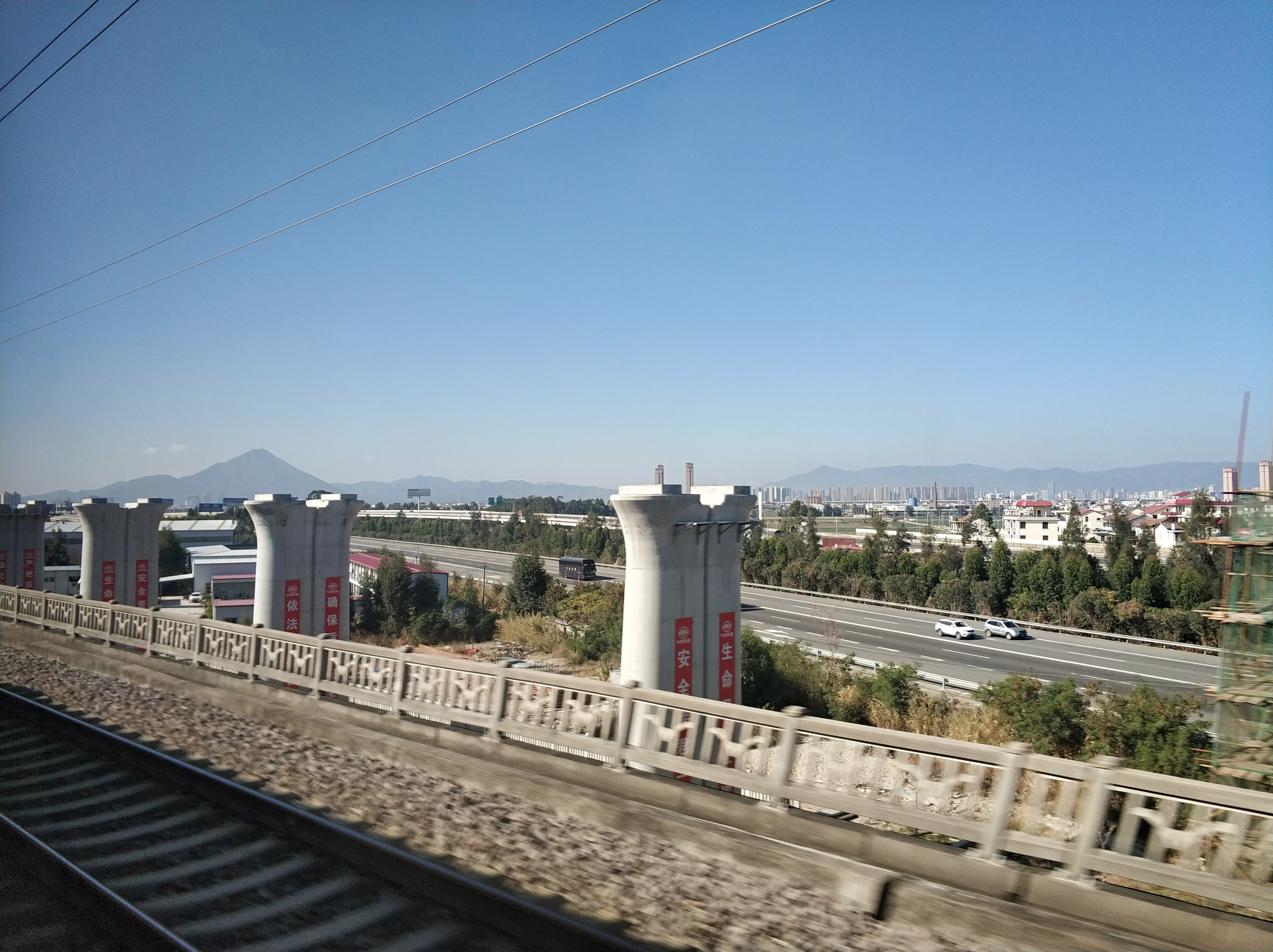

Overview
- Status: Complete
- Locale: Fujian Province, China
- Termini: Fuzhou; Zhangzhou
- Stations: 9

Service
- Operator(s): China Railway Nanchang Group

History
- Opened: 28 September 2023

Technical
- Line length: 284 km (176 mi)
- Track gauge: 1,435 mm (4 ft 8 1/2 in)
- Operating speed: 350 km/h (217 mph)

The Fuzhou–Xiamen high-speed railway is a 277 km (172 mi) railway that runs between the cities of Fuzhou, Xiamen and Zhangzhou in Fujian Province, China.

== History ==
In 2015, it was announced that a second high-speed railway line between Fuzhou, Xiamen and Zhangzhou would be constructed, as the existing Fuzhou–Xiamen railway was at capacity.

Construction began in 2017. The railway opened on 28 September 2023, with the inaugural bullet train, Fuxing G9801, departing from Fuzhou at 9:15 a.m. local time. Chinese state media has previously touted the railway as part of a broader regional integrated development plan with Taiwan, with potential expansion of the railway into Taiwan through what would be the world's longest undersea tunnel beneath the Taiwan Strait. These plans have been dismissed by Taiwan's Mainland Affairs Council.

== Route ==
The high-speed railway runs parallel to the existing Fuzhou–Xiamen railway which opened in 2010. Trains run at 350 km/h (220 mph), faster than the 250 km/h (160 mph) design speed of the existing railway. The expected journey time between Fuzhou and Xiamen is 55 minutes.

The project includes a new depot north of Xiamen North railway station.

== Stations ==
Station Name	Chinese	Metro transfers/connections	Location	
Fuzhou	福州	1 Binhai Express	Jin'an District	Fuzhou
Fuzhou South	福州南	1 5	Cangshan District	Fuzhou
Fuqing West	福清西			
Putian	莆田			
Quangang	泉港			
Quanzhou East	泉州东			
Quanzhou South	泉州南			
Xiamen North	厦门北	1		
Zhangzhou	漳州			
