= Houxi =

Houxi 后溪镇
- Town
- Location in Fujian Houxi (China)
- Coordinates: 24°37′41″N 118°02′08″E
- Country: People's Republic of China
- Province: Fujian
- Sub-provincial city: Xiamen
- District: Jimei
- Time zone: UTC+8 (China Standard)

Houxi Town (simplified Chinese: 后溪; traditional Chinese: 後溪; pinyin: Hòuxī; lit. 'back creek') is a township-level division of Jimei District, Xiamen City, Fujian, China.

== See also ==
- List of township-level divisions of Fujian
