= Xiamen Gaoqi railway station =

Railway station in Fujian, China

Xiamen Gaoqi 厦门高崎
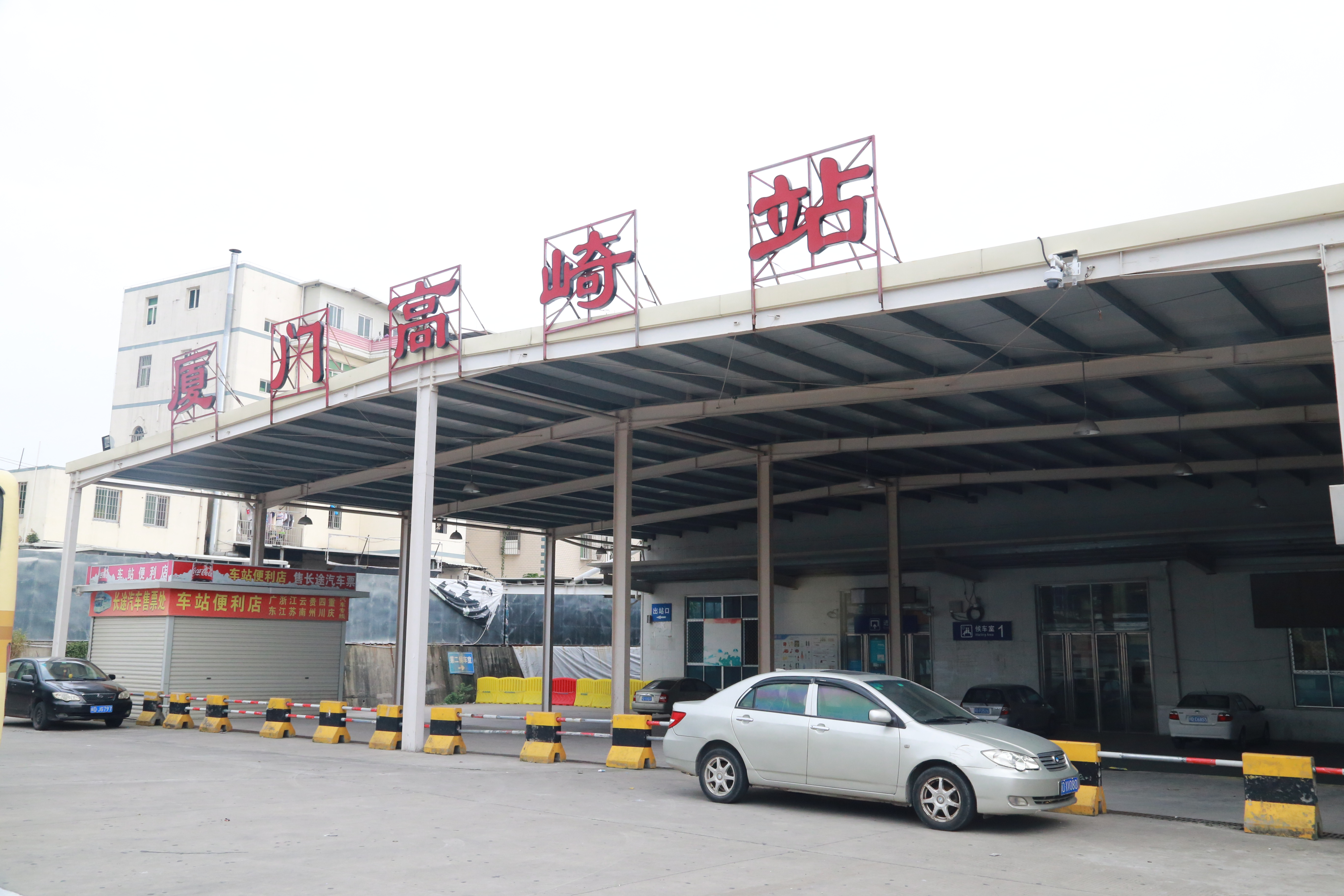

General information
- Location: Huli District, Xiamen, Fujian; China
- Coordinates: 24.53997°N 118.10966°E
- Operator: China Railway
- Line: Yingtan–Xiamen railway

Other information
- Station code: TMIS code: 34574; Telegraph code: XBS; Pinyin code: XMQ
Location
- Location within Fujian Location within China

Xiamen Gaoqi railway station is a freight railway station in Huli District, Xiamen, Fujian, China.

== History ==
This station was built with the Yingtan–Xiamen railway.

Its name was changed from Xiamen North to Gaoqi in April 2010, coinciding with the opening of the new Xiamen North railway station. It renamed from Gaoqi to Xiamen Gaoqi in 2012.

In January 2011, the railway station began serving passenger trains to relieve pressure on Xiamen railway station. Passenger service was discontinued after 13 March 2015, as the expansion project of Xiamen was nearly complete and expected to be finished before the following year's spring festival.
