= Fuzhou South railway station =

Railway station in Cangshan, Fuzhou

Fuzhou South 福州南
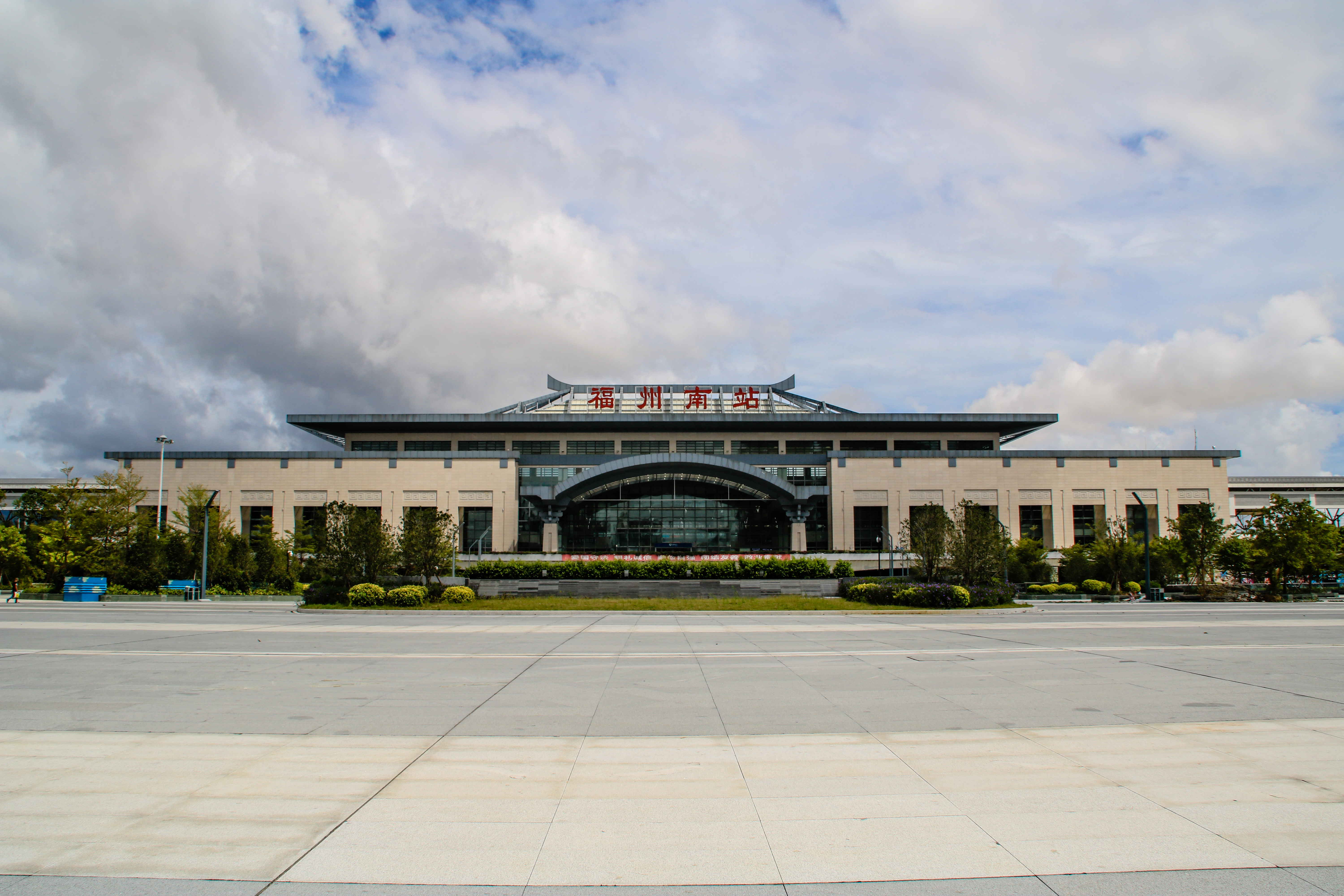

General information
- Other names: Fuzhou South
- Location: Cangshan District, Fuzhou, Fujian; China
- Coordinates: 25.98625°N 119.39037°E
- Operated by: CR Nanchang; Fuzhou Metro
- Lines: Fuzhou–Pingtan railway Fuzhou–Xiamen high-speed railway
- Connections: Bus terminal

History
- Opened: April 26, 2010; May 18, 2016
Location

Fuzhounan (Fuzhou South) Railway Station (Chinese: 福州南站; pinyin: Fúzhōu Nánzhàn; Foochow Romanized: Hók-ciŭ Nàng-câng) is a metro station and a railway station located in Cangshan District, Fuzhou, Fujian Province, China, along the Wenzhou–Fuzhou railway and Fuzhou–Xiamen railway operated by the CR Nanchang, part of the China Railway Corporation. It is the largest railway station in Fujian.

== History ==
The station began construction on September 2, 2008 and opened on April 26, 2010. The older station building, the Hangzhou-Shenzhen Square Station Building (Chinese: 杭深场站房; pinyin: Háng-Shēn Chǎng Zhànfáng), lies over the Fuzhou–Xiamen railway line.

The station has undergone expansion to accommodate the Fuzhou–Xiamen high-speed railway, with the new Yong Square Station Building (甬广场站房; Yǒng Guǎngchǎng Zhànfáng) opening with the new line on September 28, 2023. Currently there are 7 entrances and 8 exits, and six floors in total, including those for the metro platforms below ground, and the train platforms at on the highest level.

== Services ==
=== China Railway ===
Fuzhou South 福州南

General information
- Other names: Fuzhou South
- Location: Cangshan District, Fuzhou, Fujian; China
- Operated by: Nanchang Railway Bureau, China Railway Corporation
- Lines: Wenzhou–Fuzhou Railway, Fuzhou–Xiamen Railway, Fuzhou–Pingtan railway, Fuzhou–Xiamen high-speed railway
- Platforms: 26
- Connections: Bus terminal; Metro

History
- Opened: 2010

Services
| Preceding station | China Railway High-speed | Following station |
|---|---|---|
| Lianjiang towards Hangzhou East | Hangzhou–Fuzhou–Shenzhen railway | Fuqing towards Shenzhen North |
| Zhanglin towards Fuzhou | Fuzhou–Xiamen railway | Terminus |
| Fuzhou Terminus | Fuzhou–Pingtan railway | Changle towards Pingtan |
| Fuzhou Terminus | Fuzhou–Xiamen high-speed railway | Fuqing West towards Zhangzhou |
Location

Fuzhounan railway station (Chinese: 福州南站) is a railway station in Cangshan District, Fuzhou, Fujian, China, and is served by the Wenzhou–Fuzhou Railway, the Fuzhou–Xiamen railway, the Hangzhou–Fuzhou–Shenzhen railway and the local Fuzhou-Pingtan railway. In September 2023, the Fuzhou–Xiamen high-speed railway as part of the coastal corridor to improve the flow between the main urban areas of coastal Fujian.

=== Fuzhou Metro ===
Fuzhou South Railway Station 福州火车南站
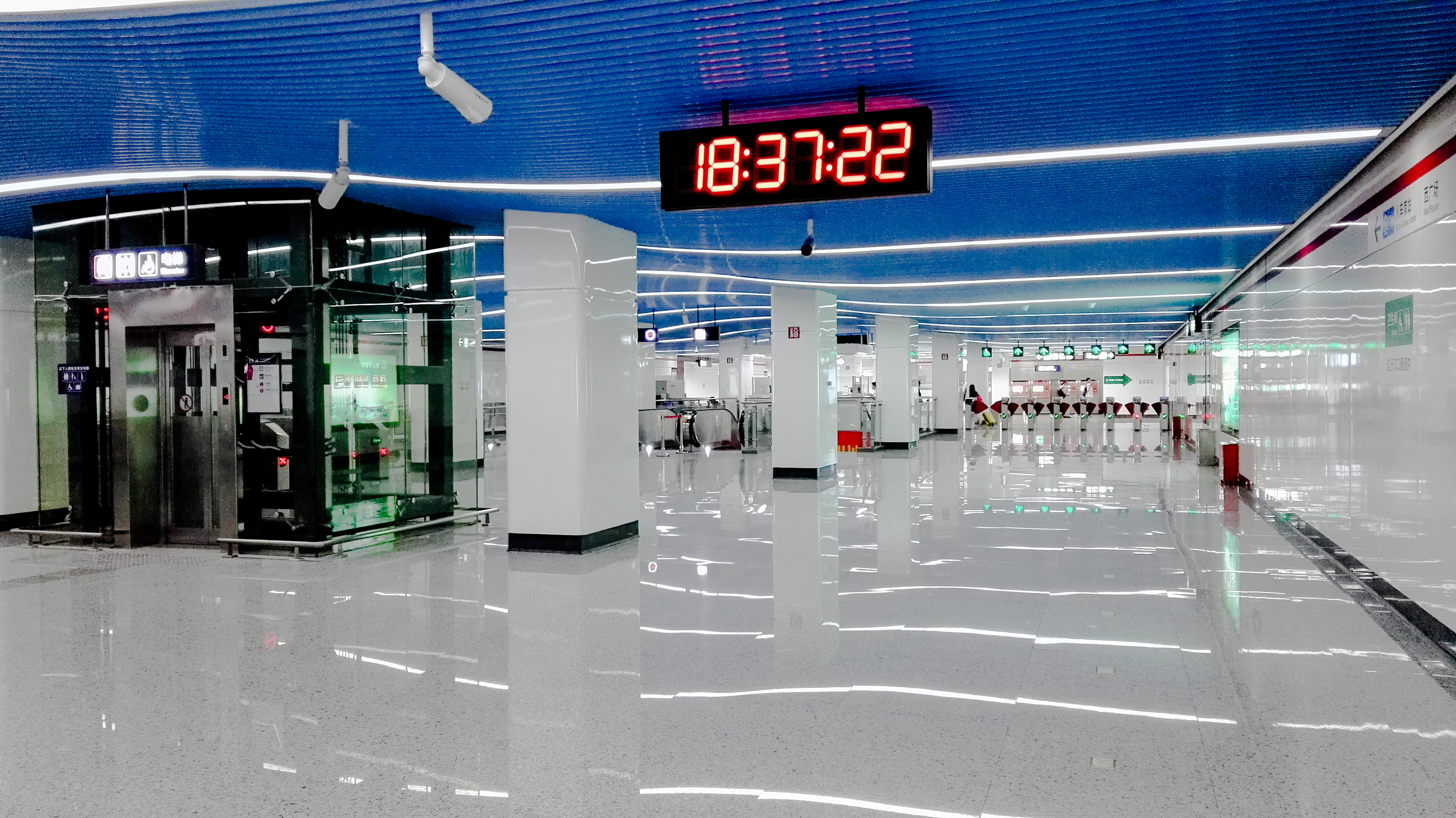

General information
- Location: Cangshan District, Fuzhou, Fujian; China
- Coordinates: 25.9882°N 119.3838°E
- Operated by: Fuzhou Metro Co. Ltd.
- Lines: Line 1 Line 5
- Platforms: 2
- Connections: Fuzhou South railway station

Construction
- Structure type: Underground

History
- Opened: Line 1: May 18, 2016; Line 5: August 27, 2023

Services
| Preceding station | Fuzhou Metro | Following station |
|---|---|---|
| Lulei towards Xiangfeng | Line 1 | Anping towards Sanjiangkou |
| Longjiang towards Jingxi Houyu | Line 5 | Terminus |
Location

Fuzhou South Railway Station (Chinese: 福州火车南站站; pinyin: Fúzhōu Huǒchē Nánzhàn zhàn; Fuzhounese: [huʔ˨˩ t͡siu˥˥ huoi˨˩ ʒia˥˥ nɑŋ˨˩ ʒiɑŋ˨˦˨]) is a metro station of Line 1 and Line 5 of the Fuzhou Metro. It is located on Lulei Road at the underground of CR railway station in Cangshan District, Fuzhou, Fujian, China. This station started operation on May 18, 2016.

==== Station layout ====
| G | Street level | Exits |
| B1 | Concourse | Customer Service, Automatic Ticketing Machines |
| B2 | Platform 1 | ← Line 1 towards Xiangfeng (Lulei) |
| Platforms | Island platform, doors will open on the left |
| | Platform 2 | Line 1 towards Sanjiangkou (Anping)→ |
| B3 | Platform 3 | ← Line 5 towards Jingxi Houyu (Longjiang) |
| Platforms | Island platform, doors will open on the left |
| | Platform 4 | Line 5 termination track (alighting passengers only) |

==== Exits ====
| Exit number | Exit location |
|---|---|
| Exit B | East of the north entrance of the transfer floor of the Fuzhounan |
| Exit C | West of the north entrance of the transfer floor of the Fuzhounan |
| Exit D1 | Southwest Exit of Transfer Floor of Fuzhounan |
| Exit D2 | Northwest Exit of Transfer Floor of Fuzhounan |
| Exit E | West of the south entrance of the transfer floor of the Fuzhounan |
| Exit F | East of the south entrance of the transfer floor of the Fuzhounan |

== See also ==
- Fuzhou Metro
- Fuzhou Railway Station
