= Xiamen North railway station =

Railway station in Houxi Town, Xiamen, China

Coordinates: 24.6388°N 118.0690°E

Xiamenbei 厦门北
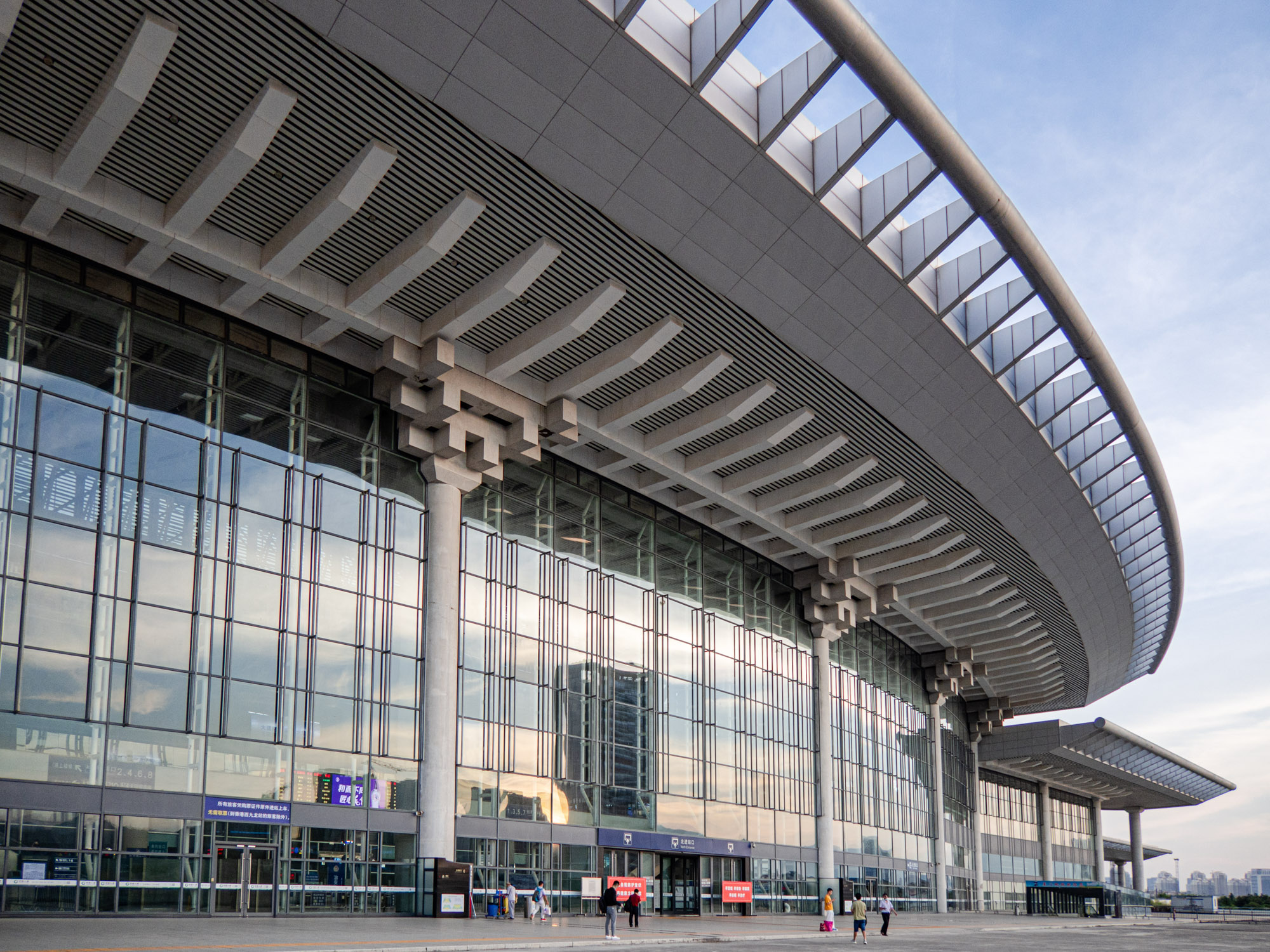

General information
- Other names: Xiamen North
- Location: Houxi Town (后溪镇), Jimei District, Xiamen, Fujian; China
- Operated by: Nanchang Railway Bureau, China Railway Corporation
- Line(s): Fuxia Railway (福厦铁路); Fuzhou–Xiamen high-speed railway (under construction)
- Platforms: 6

Other information
- Station code: TMIS code: 34178; Telegraph code: XKS; Pinyin code: XMB

History
- Opened: April 26, 2010; 15 years ago
- Previous names: New Xiamen
Location

Xiamen North railway station (simplified Chinese: 厦门北站; traditional Chinese: 廈門北站; pinyin: Xiàmén-běi Zhàn; Pe̍h-ōe-jī: Ē-mn̂g-pah Chām) is a railway station located in Houxi Town, Jimei District, Xiamen City, Fujian province, China, on the Fuzhou-Xiamen railway and Xiamen-Shenzhen railway which is operated by the Nanchang Railway Group, a subsidiary of the China Railway Group. It was built to allow train lines that pass through Xiamen to continue to the southwest rather than going into downtown Xiamen at Xiamen railway station. Due to this advantage it is now bigger than Xiamen railway station.

== History ==
The construction of the new Xiamen station (simplified Chinese: 厦门新站; traditional Chinese: 廈門新站; pinyin: Xiàmén-xīn Zhàn; Pe̍h-ōe-jī: Ē-mn̂g-chhenn Chām) started on July 10, 2007. New Xiamen Station was renamed Xiamen North Station on April 9, 2010. Xiamen North Station opened on April 26, 2010.

As New Xiamen Station (located on the mainland, in Jimei District) was renamed Xiamen North Station, the station previously known as Xiamen North Station (located in the northern part of Xiamen Island, in Huli District, near the airport) was renamed Gaoqi railway station (高崎站). Gaoqi railway station is still in operation, as the terminal station for several comparatively low-speed (K-, L-, and no-letter series) trains. The two stations are located on the opposite sides of the narrow strait separating Xiamen Island from the mainland, and should not be confused.

Line 1 of Xiamen Metro, finished in 2017, connects Xiamen North railway station with the island part of the city.

== See also ==
- Xiamen railway station
