= Xiamen railway station =

Railway station in Xiamen, China

Xiamen 厦门
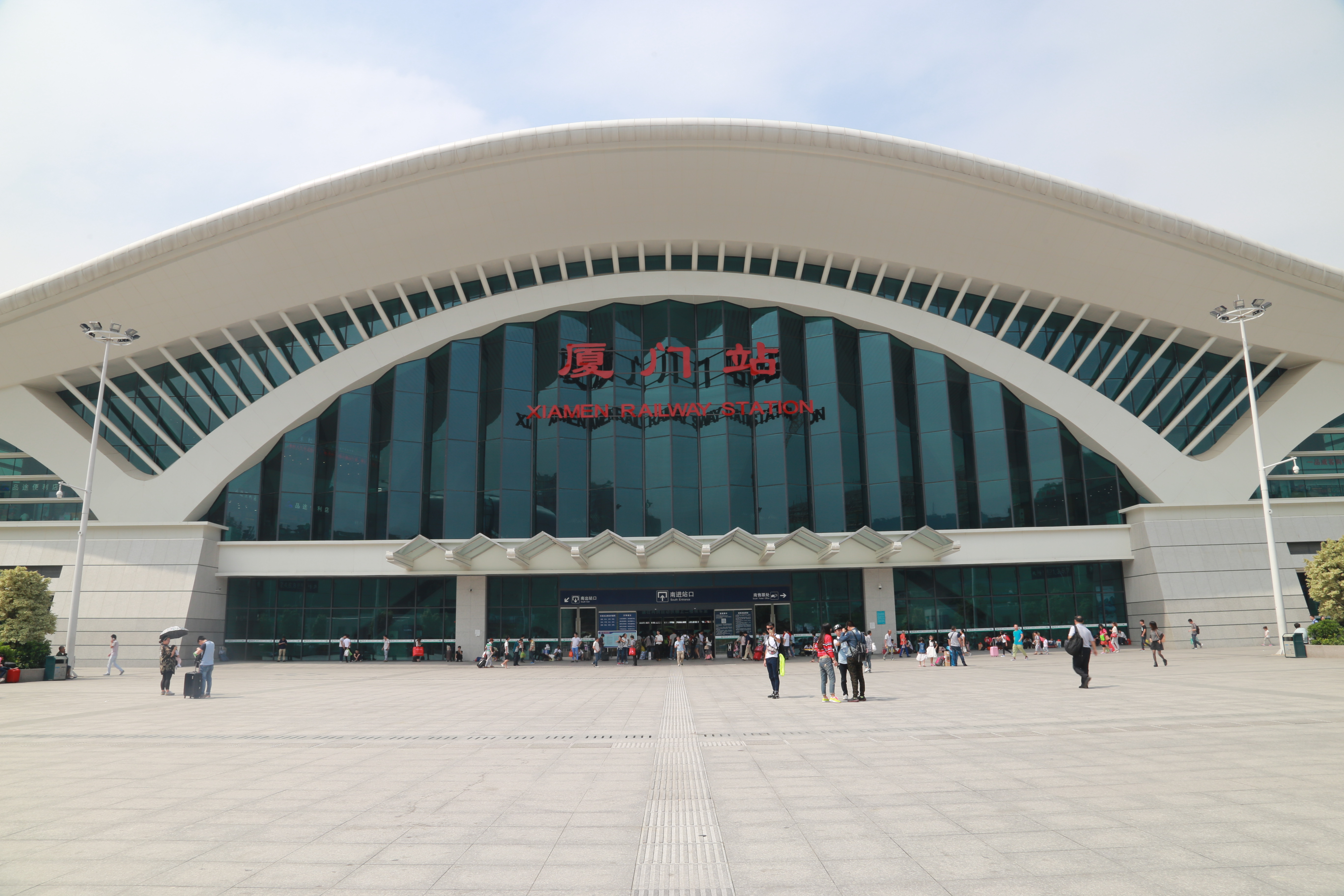
- Southern entry of Xiamen railway station

General information
- Location: Zhanqian Lu, Siming District, Xiamen, Fujian; China
- Coordinates: 24.4705°N 118.1113°E
- Operated by: Nanchang Railway Bureau, China Railway Corporation
- Line: Yingxia Railway
- Platforms: 5
- Connections: Bus terminal

Other information
- Station code: TMIS code: 34583; Telegraph code: XMS; Pinyin code: XME

History
- Opened: April 17, 1957; 69 years ago
Location

Xiamen railway station (simplified Chinese: 厦门站; traditional Chinese: 廈門站; pinyin: Xiàmén zhàn; Pe̍h-ōe-jī: Ē-mn̂g-chām) is a railway station located in Xiamen, Fujian, China, on the Yingxia Railway which is operated by Nanchang Railway Bureau, China Railway Corporation.

Located in the south-western part of Xiamen Island, near downtown Xiamen, Xiamen railway station is the terminal station for Line 3 of Xiamen Metro as well as Fuxia railway.

== Service ==
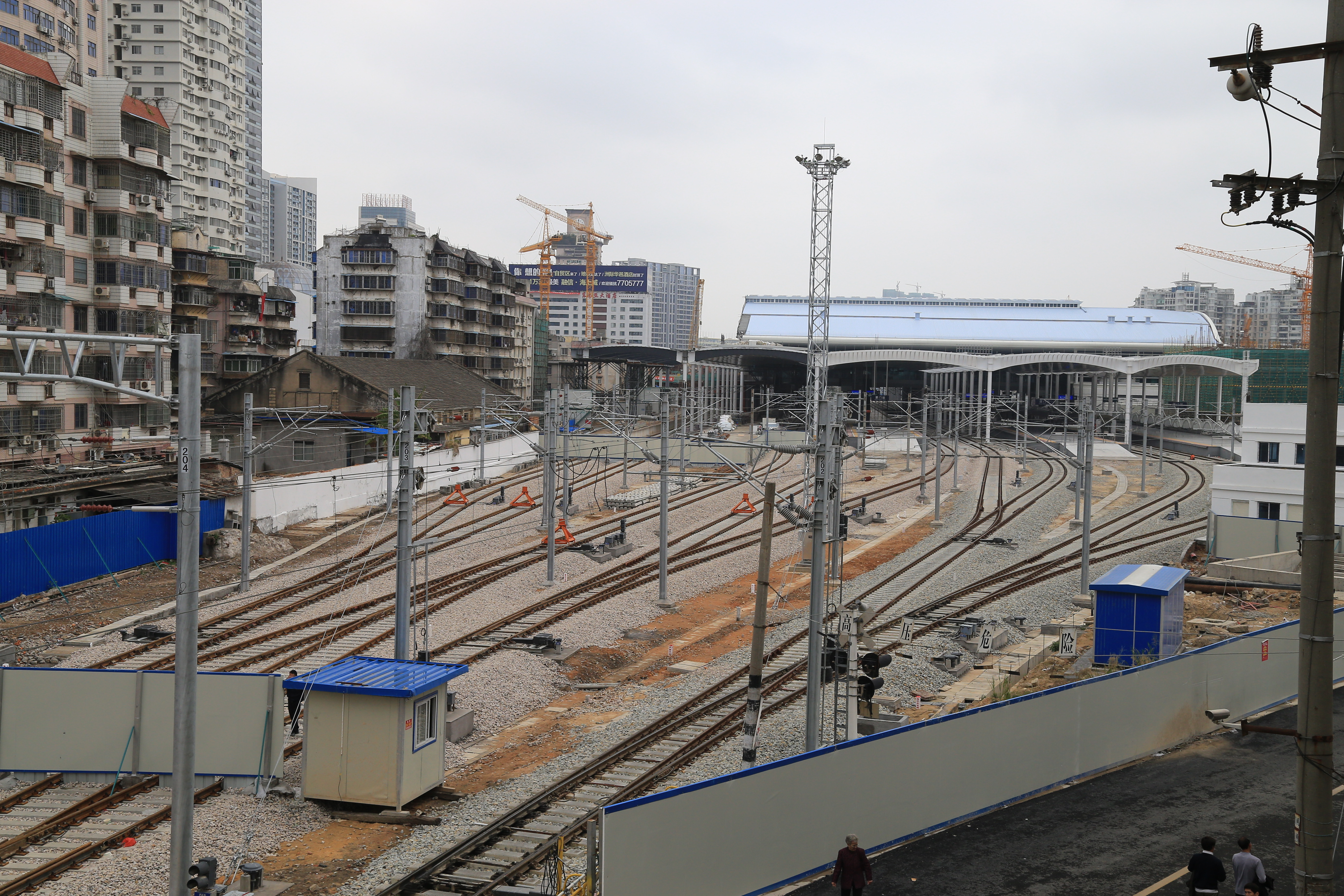
Xiamen Station tracks. The station building, seen from the trackside, is in the middle

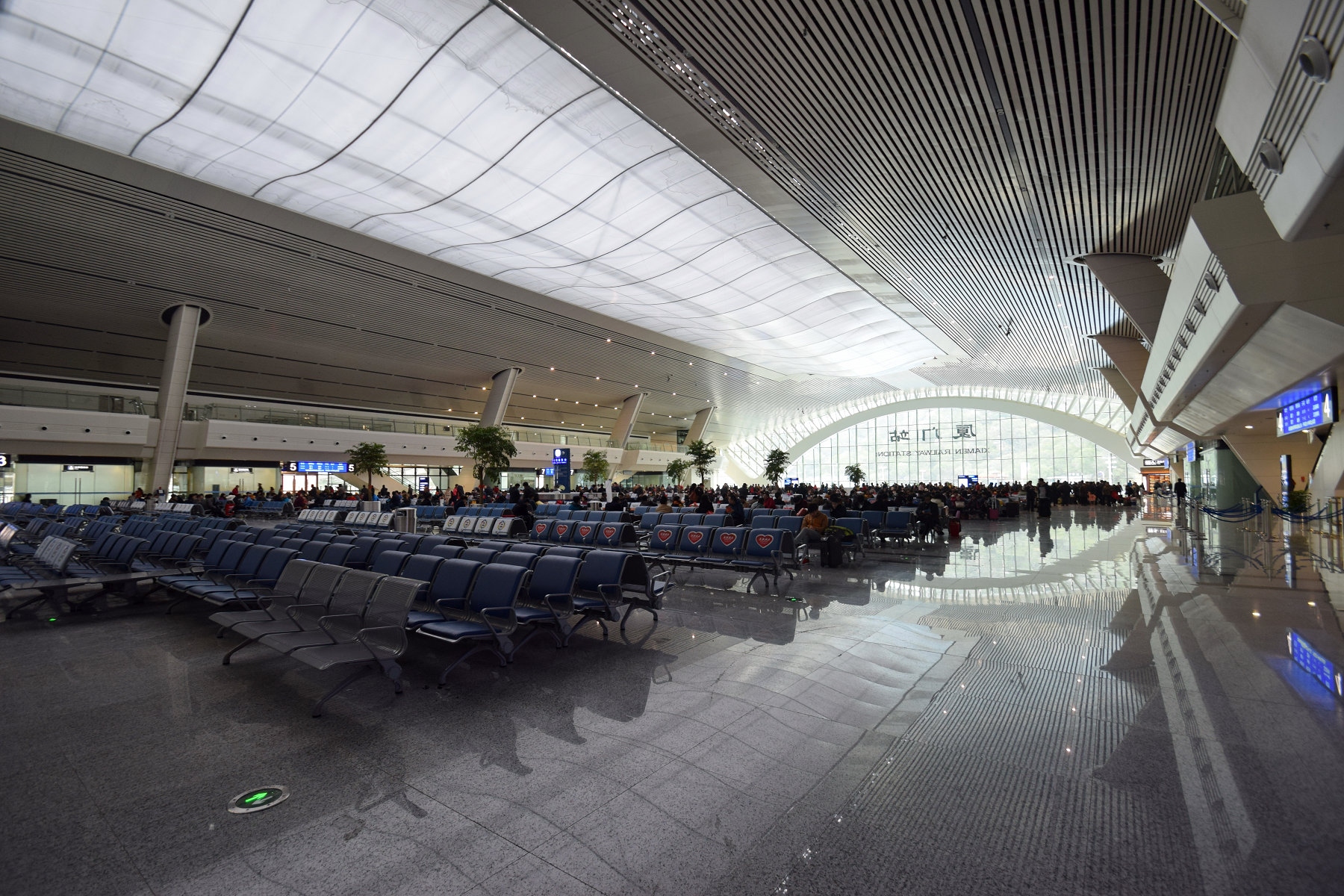
Xiamen railway station waiting hall

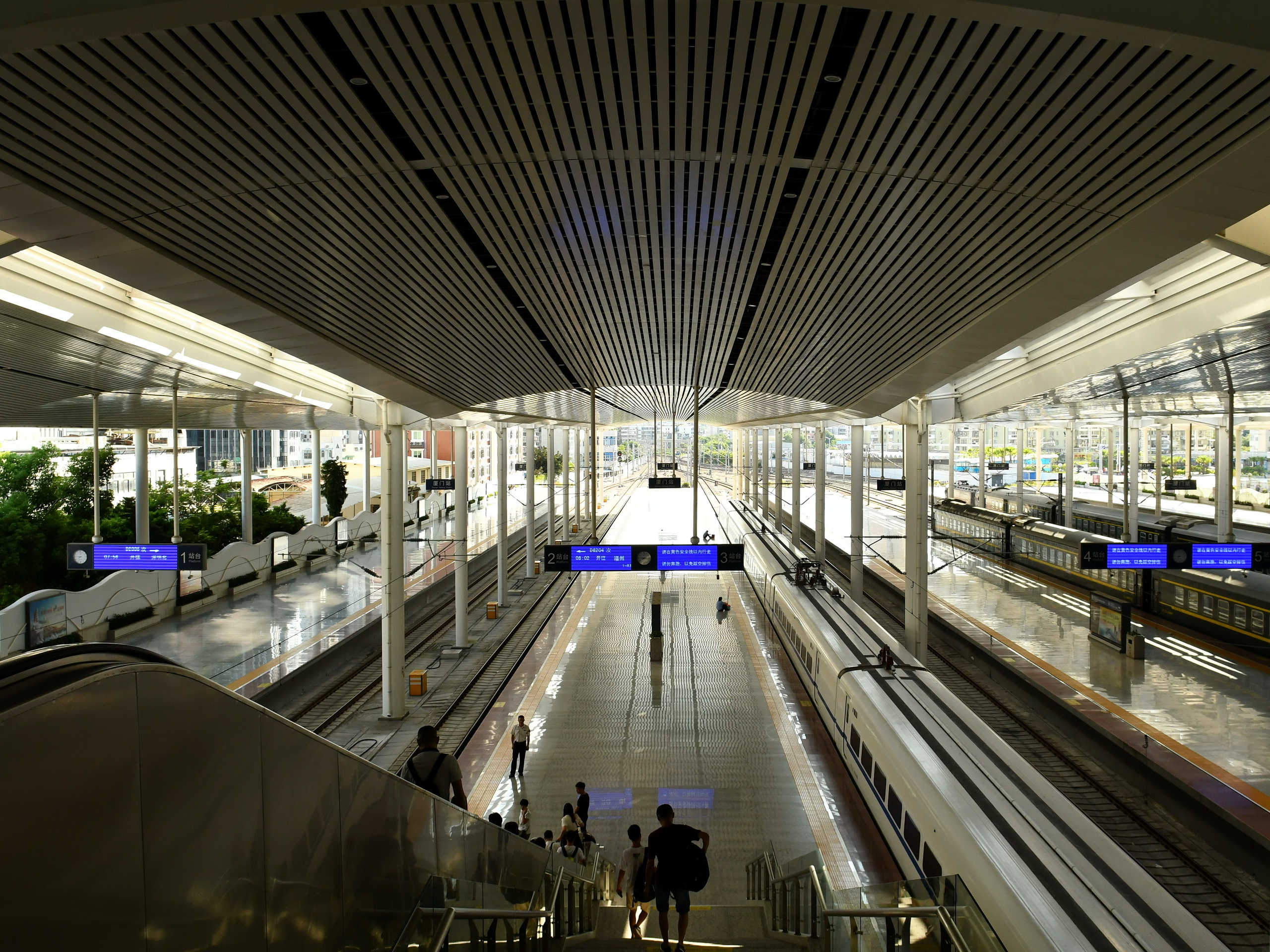
Xiamen railway station Platform

Xiamen railway station is an exception from the typical arrangement of rail services in Fujian's cities, in that it combines both "traditional" passenger trains and high-speed (D-series) trains at a single downtown location.

Since 2010, this has been the southern terminal of the Fuzhou–Xiamen railway (Fuxia), with frequent D-series trains departing to Fuzhou (via Quanzhou and other coastal cities), some of them continuing north to Wenzhou, Ningbo, Hangzhou and Shanghai Hongqiao. On June 29, 2012, the new Longyan–Xiamen railway (Longxia) opened as well, with frequent D-series trains connecting Xiamen with Longyan (with stops in Zhangzhou and Nanjing County).

Numerous conventional (K-series) trains connect Xiamen with major cities throughout China's interior. They have traditionally left the city via the Yingtan–Xiamen railway, although some (those with destinations in southern China) may have been now switched to the faster Longxia line.

The late 2023 commencement of the Fuzhou–Xiamen high-speed railway only has service at Xiamen North Railway Station at Jimei only.

== History ==
The station opened on April 17, 1957. In 2012, the upgrade construction for the station began, the project will increase the numbers of tracks from 5 to 9, platforms from 3 to 5, with the rebuild of the main building of the station, in order to relieve crowding.

== Nearby stations ==
- Xiamen Gaoqi railway station (formerly known Xiamen North) - near the north-western corner of Xiamen Island; it serves as a terminal for a few conventional trains

== Local transportation ==
Xiamen BRT has a stop outside of the railway station.

Xiamen railway station serves as the terminus for Line 3 of the Xiamen Metro.
