= Fuzhou–Xiamen railway =

Railway line in China

Coordinates: 24.8590°N 118.4825°E

Fuzhou-Xiamen railway Fuzhou–Xiamen Section of the Hangzhou–Fuzhou–Shenzhen railway
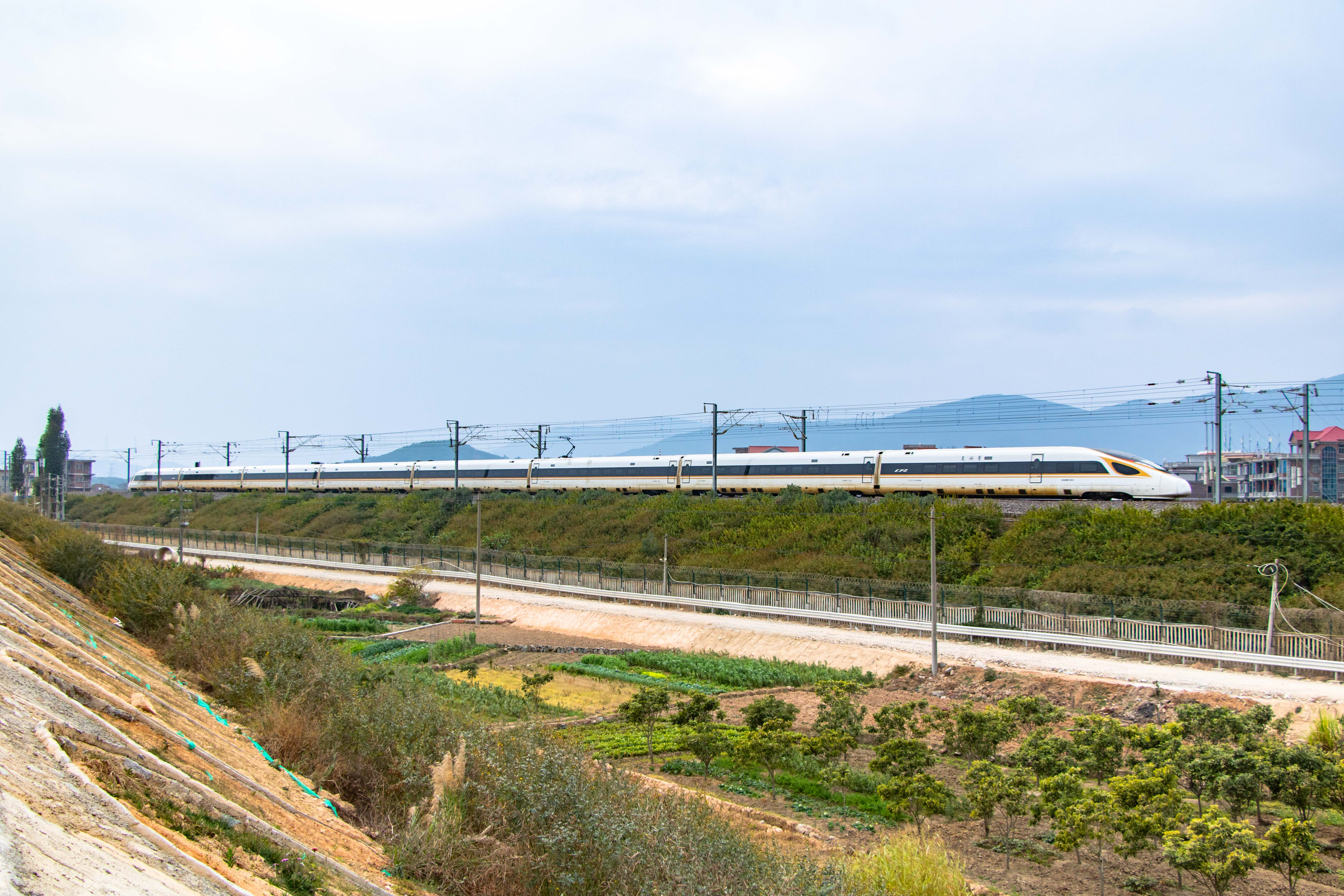
- A CR400BF high-speed train in Putian.

Overview
- Native name: 杭福深客运专线福厦段 福厦铁路 福厦高速铁路
- Owner: China Railway
- Locale: Fujian province: Fuzhou; Putian; Quanzhou; Xiamen
- Termini: Fuzhou; Xiamen
- Stations: 12

Service
- Type: High-speed rail Heavy rail
- System: China Railway High-speed
- Operator(s): CR Nanchang

History
- Opened: April 26, 2010

Technical
- Line length: 274.9 km (171 mi)
- Number of tracks: 2 (Double-track)
- Track gauge: 1,435 mm (4 ft 8 1/2 in) standard gauge
- Electrification: 25 kV 50 Hz AC (Overhead line)
- Operating speed: 200 km/h (124 mph) (current maximum speed); 250 km/h (155 mph) (designed maximum speed)

The Fuzhou–Xiamen railway or Fuxia railway (simplified Chinese: 福厦铁路; traditional Chinese: 福廈鐵路; pinyin: Fúxià Tiělù; Pe̍h-ōe-jī: Hok-ē Thih-lo̍; Foochow Romanized: Hók-â Tʰiā-le̤) is a dual-track, electrified, higher-speed rail line in eastern China. The line is named after its two terminal cities Fuzhou and Xiamen, both coastal cities in Fujian. The line has a total length of 274.9 kilometres (170.8 mi) and forms part of China's Hangzhou–Fuzhou–Shenzhen passenger-dedicated railway. Construction began in 2005, and the line entered into operation on April 26, 2010.

The line is used for both passenger and freight operations. Trains running on the line reached top speeds of 250 kilometres per hour (155 mph), although that was later reduced to 200 km/h (124 mph).

== Route ==
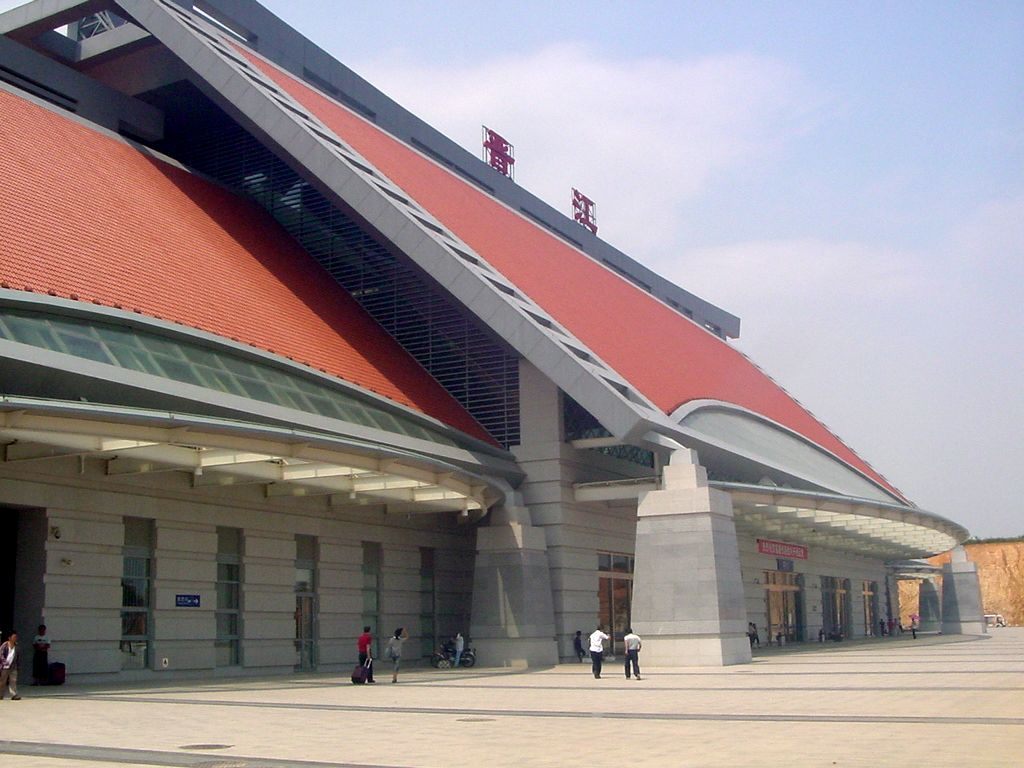
The recently built Jinjiang railway station. Prior to the construction of the Fuzhou–Xiamen railway, there was no railway service to Jinjiang.

The Fuzhou–Xiamen railway follows the rugged but prosperous coast of Fujian with 14 stations between Fuzhou South Station and Xiamen Station including Fuqing, Hanjiang, Putian, Xianyou, Quanzhou, Jinjiang, Xiamen North, Xinglin and Xiamen Gaoqi. Bridges and tunnels account for over 37% of the line's total length.

== History ==
The Fuzhou–Xiamen railway is the first railway between Fujian's two important most cities, Fuzhou, the provincial capital, and Xiamen, the province's most prosperous city. Most high-speed rail lines in China follow the routes of older conventional railroads, but there were no railways on the southeast coast prior to the introduction of high-speed rail. Historically, the southeast coastal region relied on maritime transportation, and rugged terrain made railway construction more expensive. In the first half of the 20th century, warfare and political instability delayed railway construction. During the Cold War, the southeast coast faced the threat of invasion from Republic of China on Taiwan and all railways were built inland. Only when political tensions across the Taiwan Strait eased in the late 1990s did planning of the Fuzhou–Xiamen railway take place.

The project was approved by the State Council in July 2004. Construction began in September 2005 and was completed in December 2009. Commercial operation began on April 26, 2010. Unlike later Chinese high-speed rail lines which were built to higher speed standards of 300 or 350 km/h (186 or 217 mph), the Fuzhou–Xiamen line was built to the 250 km/h (155 mph) standard with the capacity for upgrade to 300 km/h (186 mph). The opening of high-speed rail line greatly reduced travel times by rail on the coast of Fujian. Passenger train service on the line average 200 km/h (124 mph). The trip from Fuzhou to Xiamen on the non-stop express train takes 1 hr. 28 min. compared to the 10-hour train ride via railroads that cut inland. The trip by long-distance bus on the express highway takes 2.5 to 4 hours.

In the first year of operation from 2010 to 2011, the line carried over 18 million passengers, averaging 50,000 per day, and reported occupancy rates exceeding 100%.

== Competitiveness ==
Occupancy rate on the Fuxia line is among the highest of China's high-speed railways. The line offers competitive fares and passes through large cities with well-developed public transportation and high demand for intercity travel. As of February 2011, a regular ticket from Fuzhou to Xiamen costs ¥85, and a first class ticket costs ¥103. Drivers making the same trip by express highway will pay ¥300-400 including gas and tolls, and spend 1.5 more hours on the road. During the Chinese New Year, the peak season for intercity travel, the number of long distance bus trips between Fuzhou and Xiamen fell from 98 per day in 2010 to just 7 per day in 2011. Long distance bus ridership from Fuzhou to Xiamen fell by 83%, to Quanzhou by 63%, to Jinjiang by 50%, to Shishi by 25% and to Putian by 38%. In August 2015, it was announced that a parallel passenger-dedicated line (resulting in journey time savings) would be built between Fuzhou and Zhangzhou on account of the existing line having reached its capacity.

== Rail connections ==
- Fuzhou: Wenzhou–Fuzhou railway, Nanping–Fuzhou railway, Xiangtang–Putian railway
- Putian: Xiangtang–Putian railway
- Quanzhou: Zhangping–Quanzhou–Xiaocuo railway, Xingguo–Quanzhou railway
- Xiamen: Longyan–Xiamen railway, Xiamen–Shenzhen railway

== Parallel route ==
As of 2015, passenger services on the line were approaching capacity. To increase capacity and improve travel times between Fujian Province's two largest cities, plans were announced in 2015 for the construction of a new parallel passenger dedicated railway called the Fuzhou–Xiamen high-speed railway. Construction of this new railway started in 2017. It follows the existing Fuzhou–Xiamen railway, but supports a higher maximum speed of 350 km/h, further reducing travel times between the two cities to below one hour. Opening of the new line was scheduled for 2022, the route finally opened in 2023.

== See also ==
- List of railways in China
