= China Railway Nanchang Group =

Chinese railway operator

China Railway Nanchang Group Co., Ltd.
- Company type: state-owned enterprise
- Industry: Railway operations
- Predecessor: Nanchang Railway Administration
- Founded: 19 November 2017
- Headquarters: 7 Zhanqian Road, Xihu, Nanchang, Jiangxi, China
- Area served: Jiangxi; Fujian
- Owner: Government of China
- Parent: China Railway
- Website: Official Weibo Website

China Railway Nanchang Group
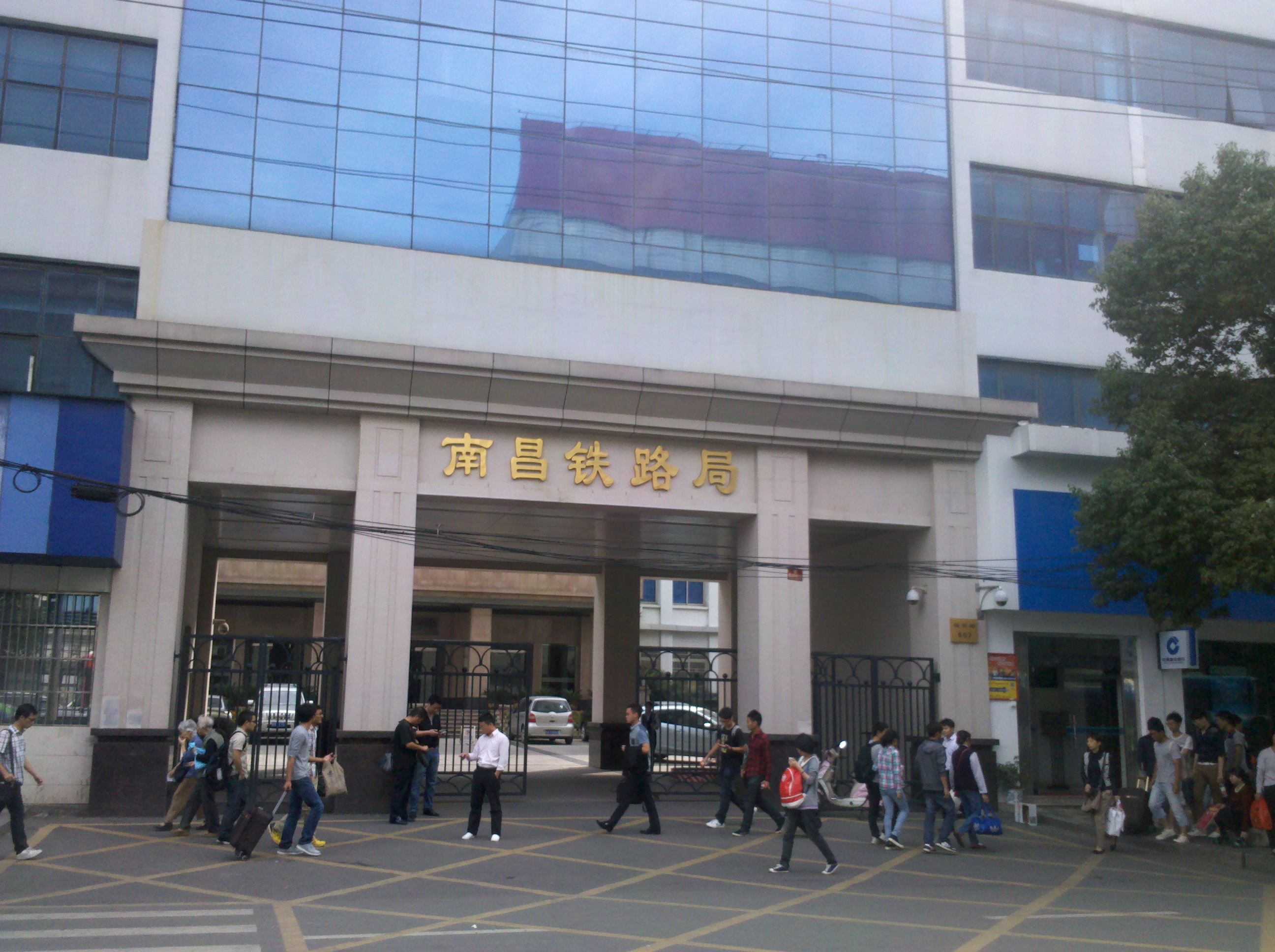
- Headquarter of CR Nanchang
- Simplified Chinese: 中国铁路南昌局集团
- Traditional Chinese: 中國鐵路南昌局集團
Transcriptions
Standard Mandarin
- Hanyu Pinyin: Zhōngguó Tiělù Nánchāng Jú Jítuán

Nanchang Railway Administration
- Simplified Chinese: 南昌铁路局
- Traditional Chinese: 南昌鐵路局
Transcriptions
Standard Mandarin
- Hanyu Pinyin: Nánchāng Tiělù Jú

CR Nanchang
- Simplified Chinese: 昌铁
- Traditional Chinese: 昌鐵
Transcriptions
Standard Mandarin
- Hanyu Pinyin: Chāngtiě

China Railway Nanchang Group, officially abbreviated as CR Nanchang or CR-Nanchang, formerly, Nanchang Railway Administration is a subsidiary company operating under the umbrella of the China Railway Group (formerly the Ministry of Railway). The railway administration was reorganized as a company in November 2017.

It is responsible for the railway network within Jiangxi and Fujian.

== Hub stations ==
- Nanchang
  - Nanchang, Xiangtang West
- Yingtan
  - Yingtan
- Fuzhou
  - Fuzhou
- Xiamen
  - Xiamen, Xiamen North
