= Aojiang =

Aojiang could mean:

- Ao River (鳌江) in Zhejiang, China
  - Aojiang Town (鳌江镇), a town on the Ao River in Zhejiang
  - Pingyang railway station, formerly Aojiang station
- Ao River (敖江) in Fujian, China
  - Aojiang Town (敖江镇), a town on the Ao River in Fujian
- Aojiang Town (鳌江镇) in Guangdong, China
