= Lianjiang railway station =

Railway station in Fuzhou, Fujian, China

Coordinates: 26.1942°N 119.5675°E

Lianjiang 连江
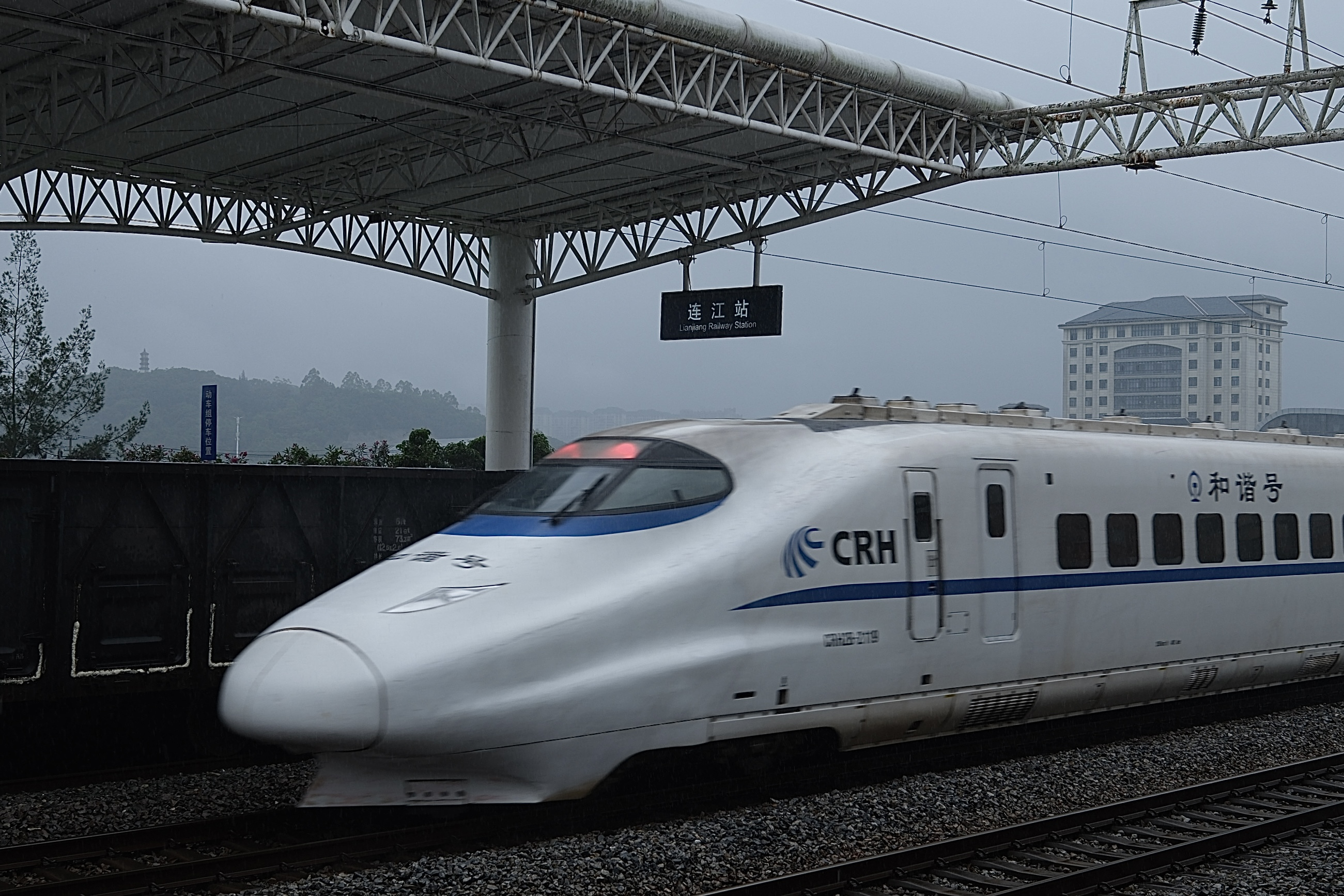
- CRH2 train passing Lianjiang Railway Station, 2026

General information
- Location: Lianjiang County, Fujian; China
- Operated by: Nanchang Railway Bureau, China Railway Corporation
- Line: Wenzhou–Fuzhou railway
Location

Lianjiang railway station (Chinese: 连江站) is a railway station located in Lianjiang County, Fuzhou, Fujian Province, China, on the Wenzhou–Fuzhou railway operated by the Nanchang Railway Bureau, China Railway Corporation. The station is located on the south bank of the Ao River.

| Preceding station | China Railway High-speed | Following station |
|---|---|---|
| Luoyuan towards Wenzhou South | Wenzhou–Fuzhou railway | Fuzhou South Terminus |
