= Lianjiang County =

County of Fuzhou, Fujian, China

Lianjiang 连江县 Lienkong, Lienkiang, Lienchiang
- County
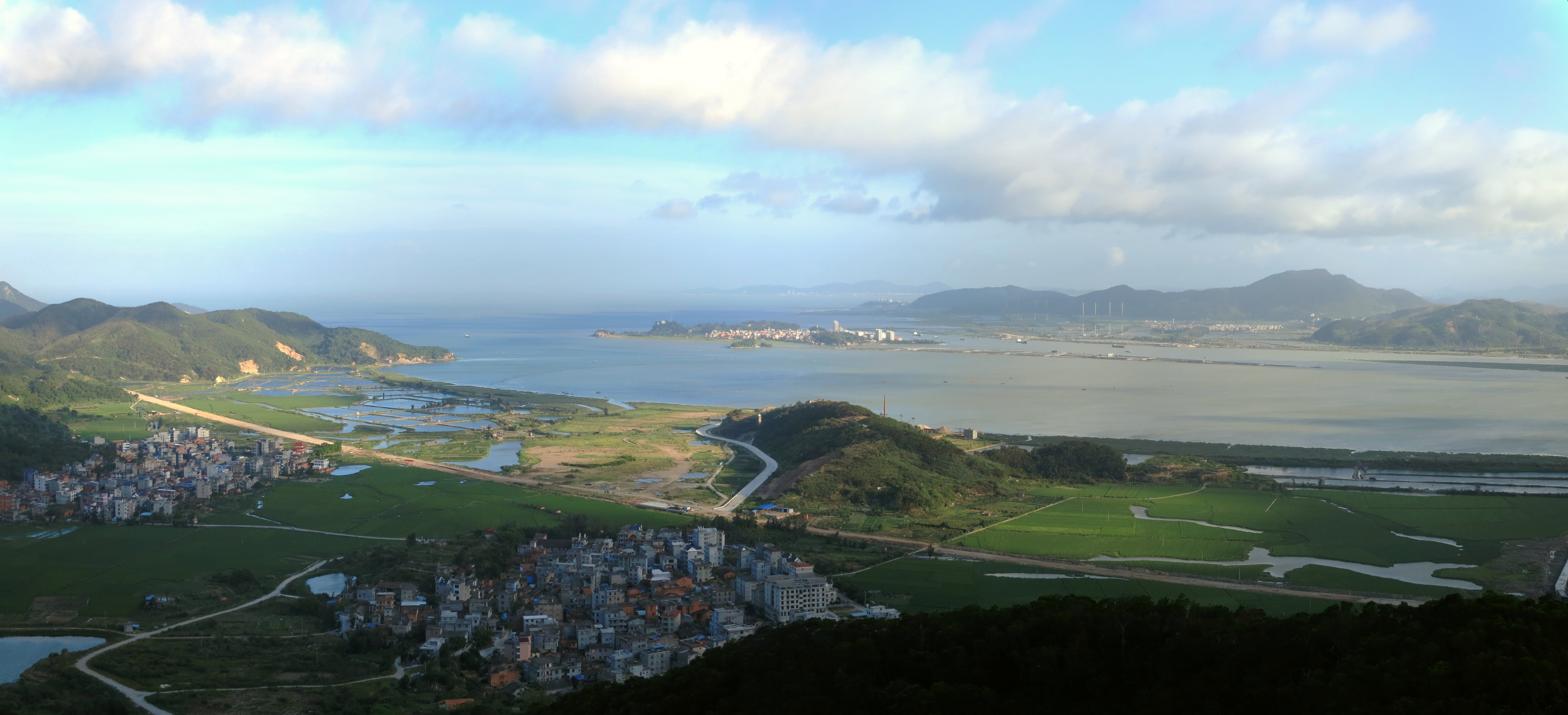
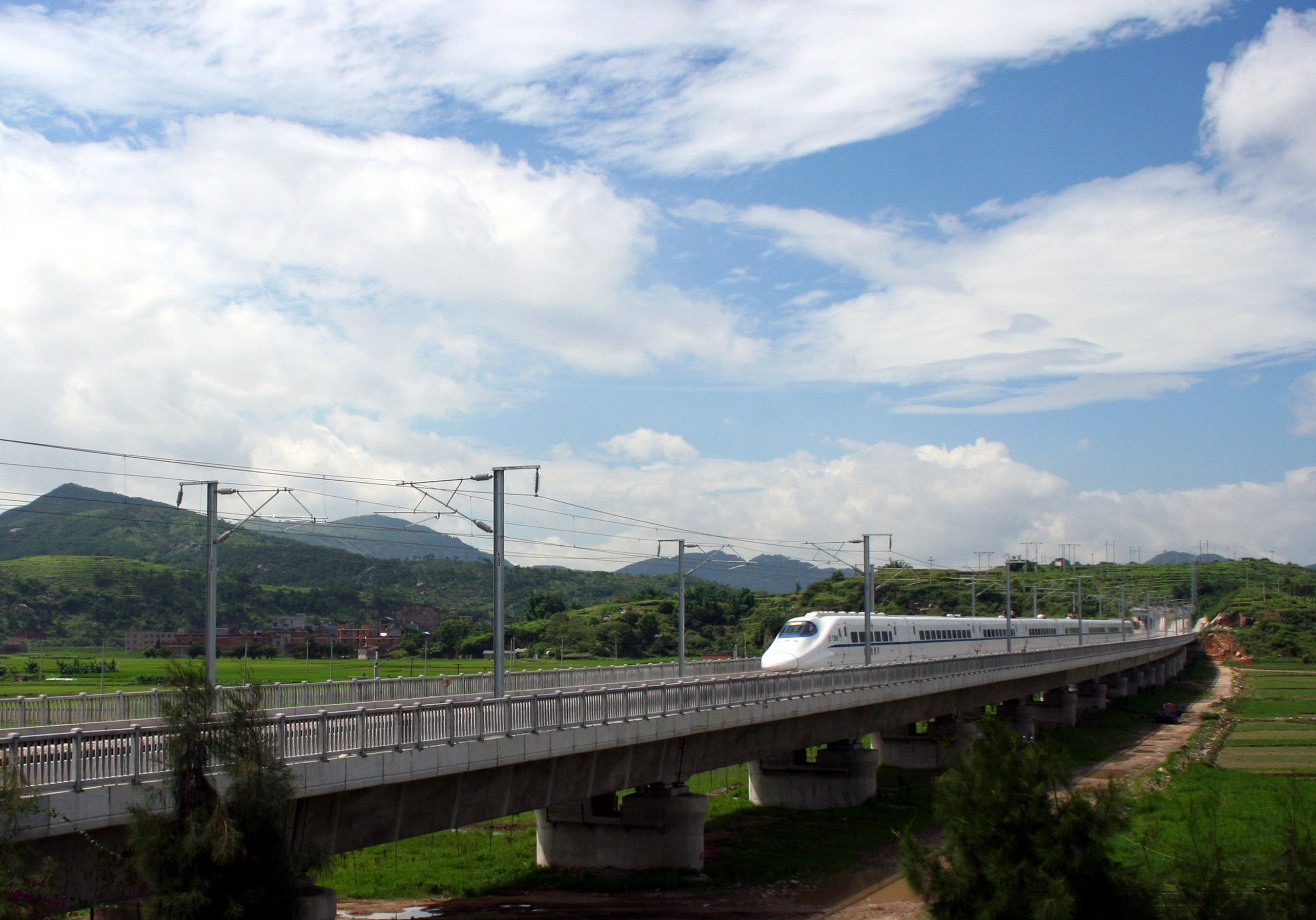
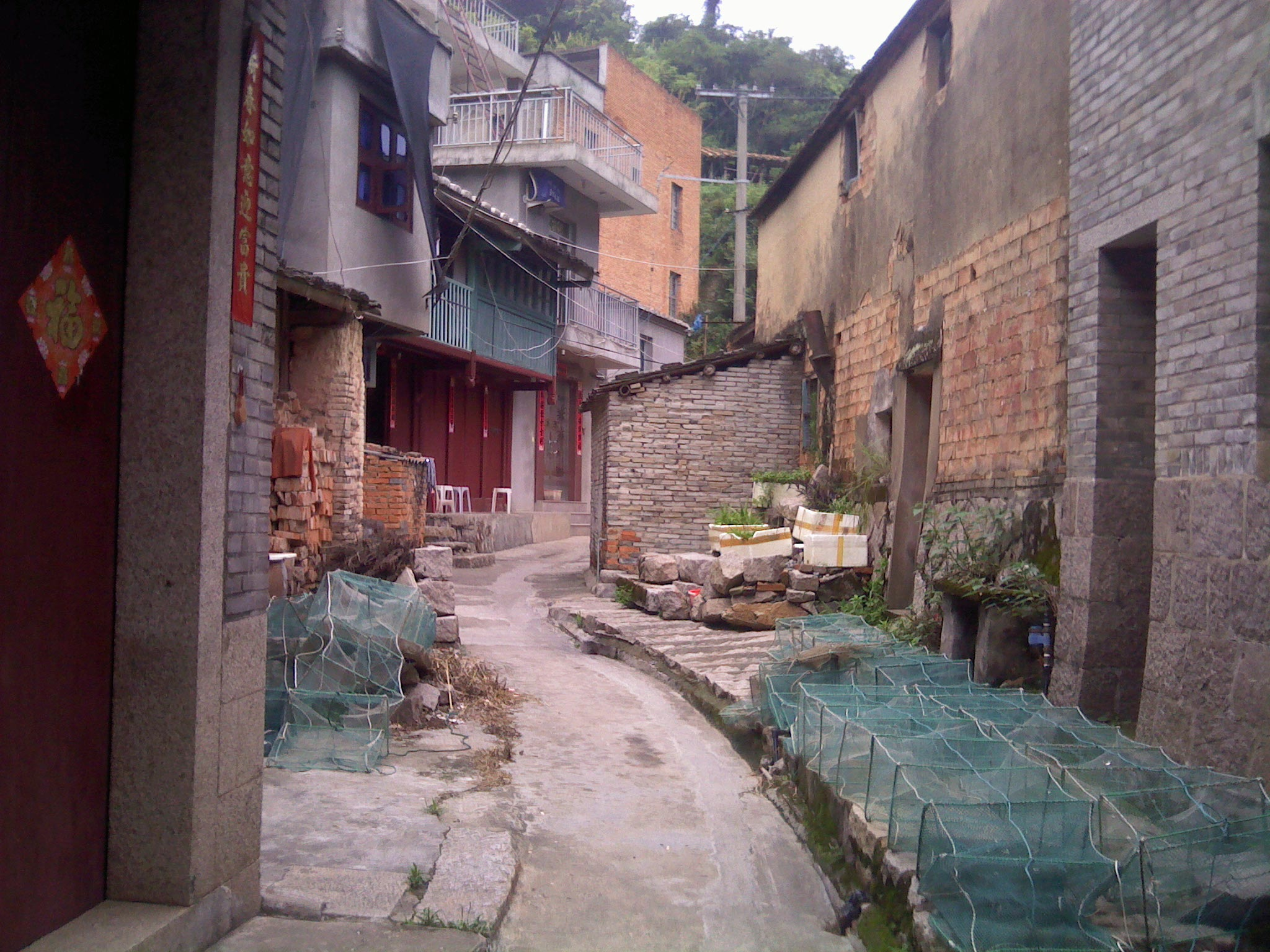
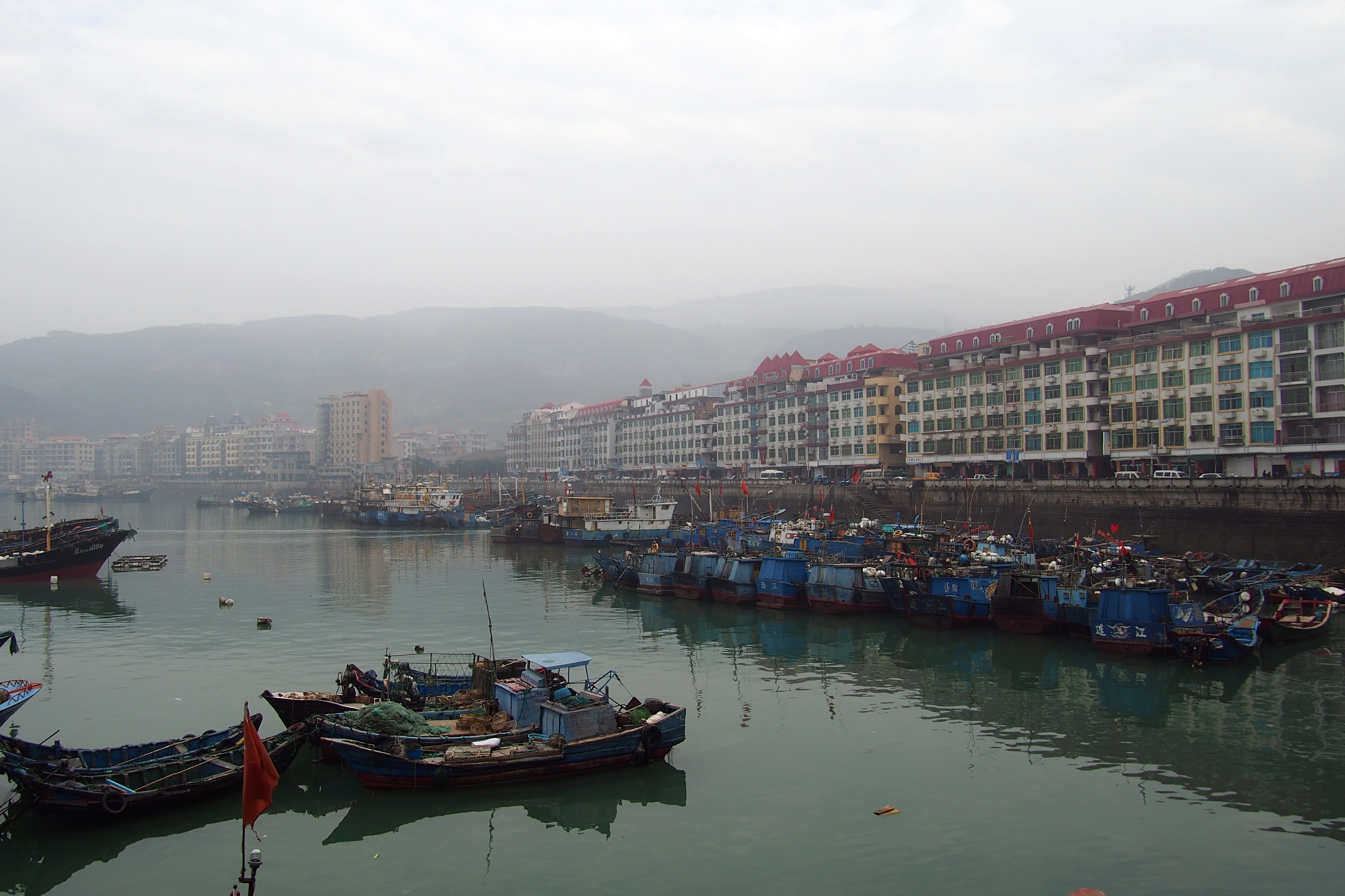
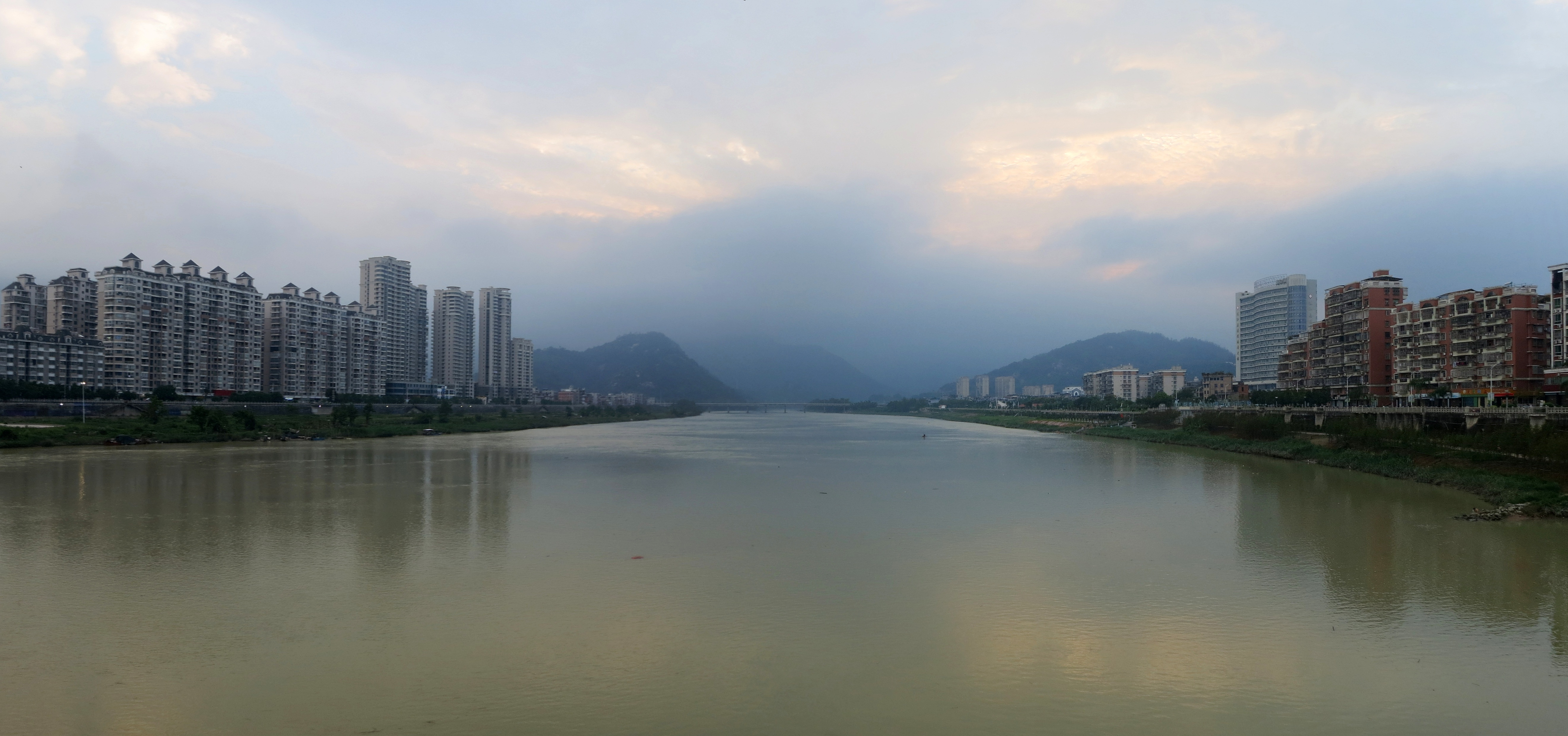
- Clockwise from top: Southward View from Jiulong Mountain, a street in Chuanshi Village, the Ao River passing through Fengcheng, Huangqi fishing port, and the Wenzhou-Fuzhou Railway.

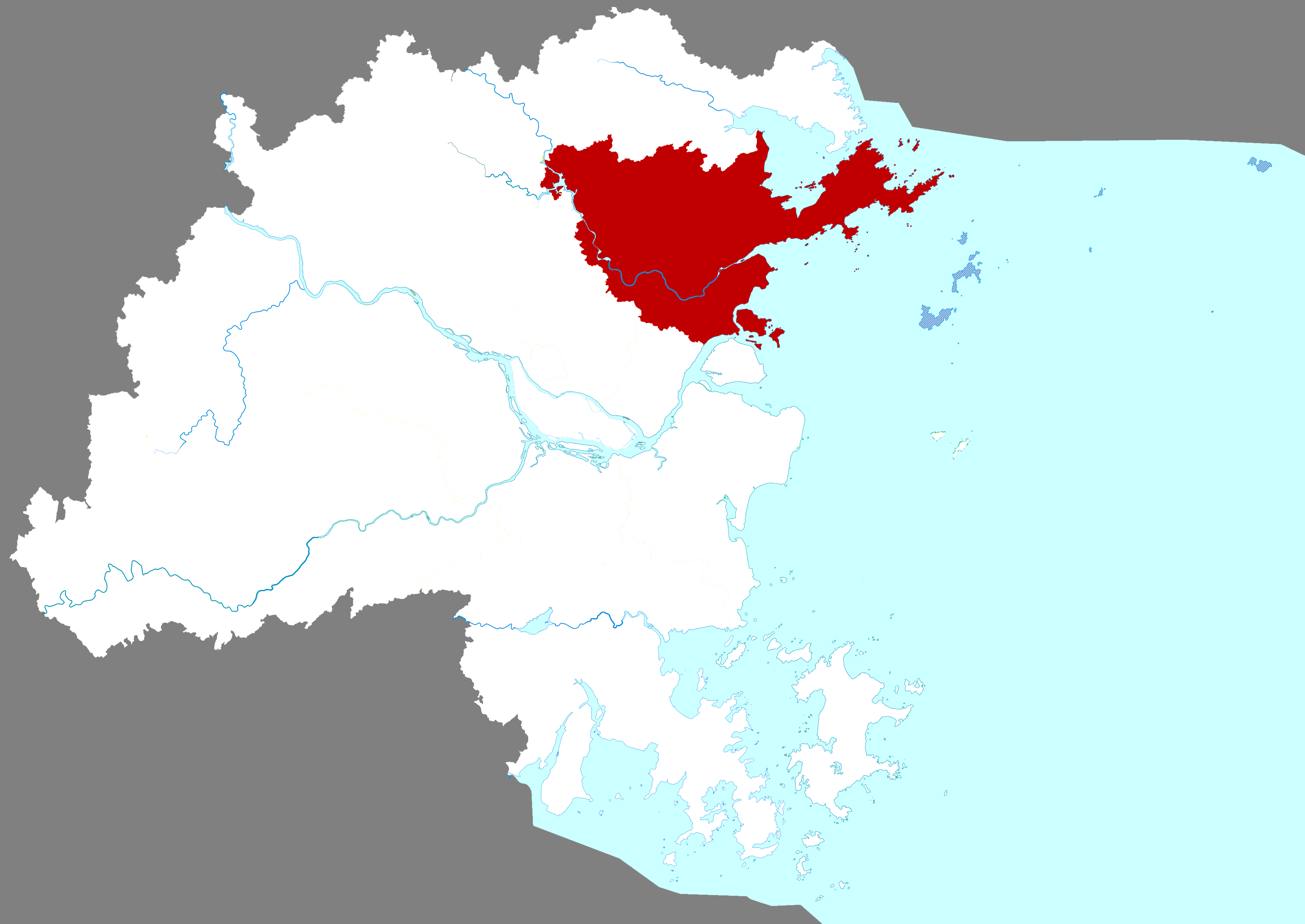
- Location in Fuzhou City

- Location in Fujian Province
- Coordinates: 26°12′N 119°32′E
- Country: People's Republic of China
- Province: Fujian
- Prefecture-level city: Fuzhou
- Seat: Fengcheng
- Township-level divisions: 16 towns, 6 townships

Area (Note: Area figure excludes the Matsu Islands (north).)
  - Total: 1,168 km^{2} (451 sq mi)

Population (2010)
  - Total: 561,490
  - Density: 480.7/km^{2} (1,245/sq mi)
- Time zone: UTC+08:00 (China Standard)
- Postal code: 350500
- Website: ljx.fuzhou.gov.cn (in Chinese)

Lianjiang (simplified Chinese: 连江; traditional Chinese: 連江; pinyin: Liánjiāng; Wade–Giles: Lien²-chiang¹; BUC: Lièng-gŏng) is a county on the eastern coast in Fuzhou prefecture-level city, the provincial capital of Fujian Province, China. Most of the county is administered by the People's Republic of China (PRC), while a number of outlying islands, collectively referred to as the Matsu Islands, are administered as Lienchiang County (referred to using Wade–Giles romanization) by the Republic of China (ROC) ever since the end of its occupation by Japan in World War II.

== History ==
Lianjiang, in 282, during the Jin dynasty, was Wenma, named after a shipyard there, Wensha Ship-hamlet (溫麻船屯). It was incorporated into Min Prefecture (閩縣) in 607, during the Sui dynasty.

Wenma was changed to the present name and made its own county in 623, during the Tang dynasty, when Baisha (白沙) or Fusha (伏沙) of Aojiang was the capital of Lianjiang County. The capital was changed to Fengcheng as today in 742.

After the Republic of China was established, Lianjiang switched back and forth numerous times between two special regions:

- Minhou Special Region (閩侯專區): 18 years in total
- Fu'an (Ningde) Special Region (福安（寧德）專區): 16 years in total

During the Second Sino-Japanese War on 10 September 1937, Japan seized the two Lianjiang islands of Beigan and Nangan via the Collaborationist Chinese Army, making the islands the first in Fujian to fall to Japan. This led the county government to relocate to Danyang Township on April 19, 1941, before returning at the end of the war.

In 1949, the county was split in two due to the Chinese Civil War, as it remains today.

On 4 March 1964, a Chinese Nationalist commando raid on the Chinese Communist Party headquarters of the county captured and returned a commune file to Taipei.

Beginning on 1 July 1983, the PRC side reverted control to Fuzhou Municipality. In the late 1980s, people living in Lianjiang County began a massive emigration wave to western countries like the United Kingdom and the United States.

== Geography ==
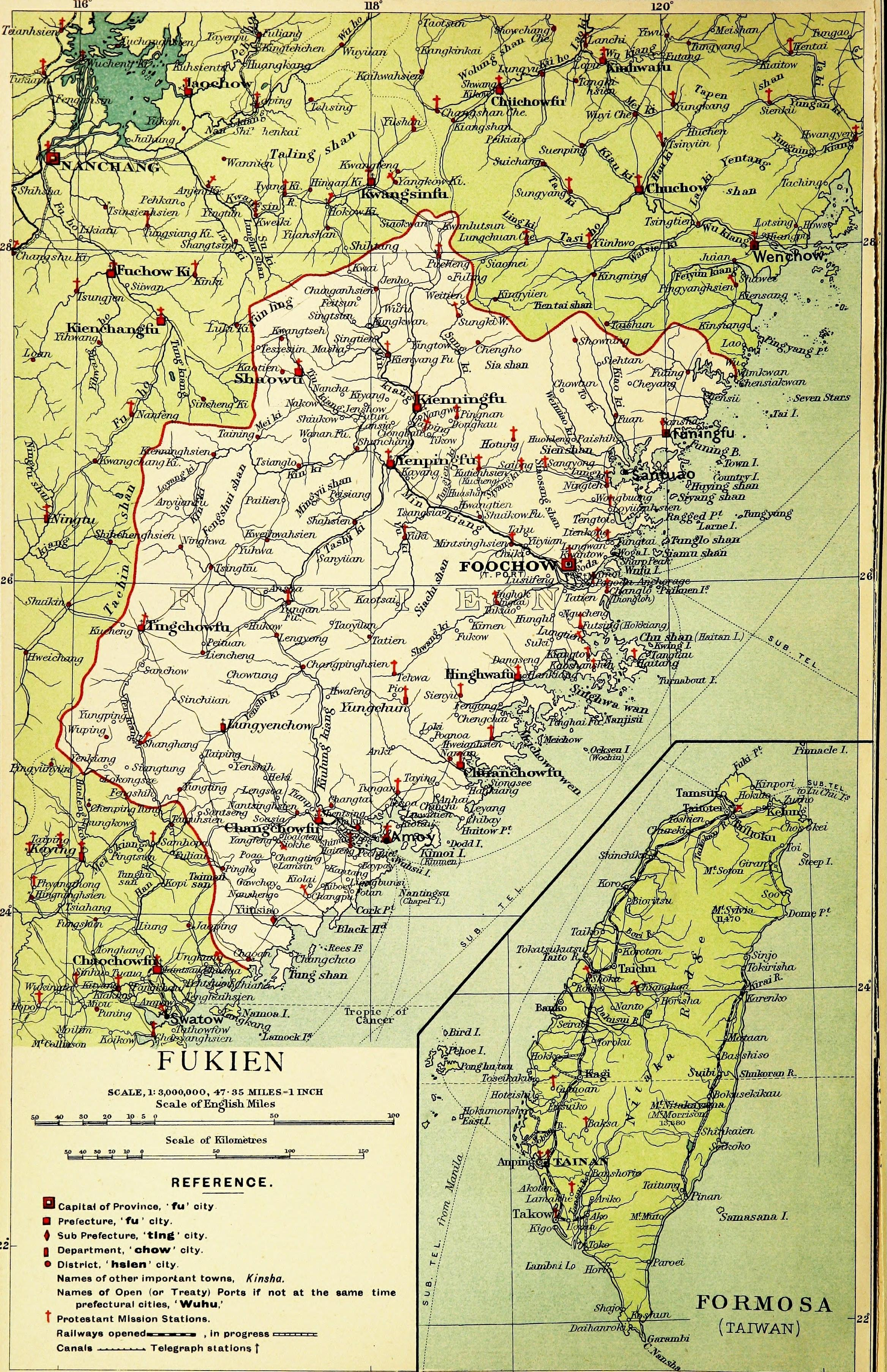
Map including Lianjiang (labelled as Lienkong) (1917)

Gaodeng Island in Lienchiang County (the Matsu Islands), ROC (Taiwan), is located 9.25 kilometres (5.75 mi) away from the Beijiao Peninsula (北茭半岛) in Lianjiang County, China (PRC).

- Geographic coordinates: 26°03'-26°27' N, 119°17'-120°31' E
- Coastline length: 209 km (130 mi)

== Climate ==
Climate data for Lianjiang, elevation 13 m (43 ft), (1991–2020 normals, extremes 1981–2022)
Month	Jan	Feb	Mar	Apr	May	Jun	Jul	Aug	Sep	Oct	Nov	Dec	Year
Record high °C (°F)	26.5 (79.7)	29.1 (84.4)	32.2 (90.0)	32.9 (91.2)	34.7 (94.5)	37.2 (99.0)	38.7 (101.7)	38.0 (100.4)	36.0 (96.8)	33.2 (91.8)	31.6 (88.9)	27.9 (82.2)	38.7 (101.7)
Mean daily maximum °C (°F)	14.7 (58.5)	15.2 (59.4)	17.8 (64.0)	22.4 (72.3)	26.5 (79.7)	30.1 (86.2)	33.3 (91.9)	32.6 (90.7)	29.9 (85.8)	25.9 (78.6)	21.8 (71.2)	17.1 (62.8)	23.9 (75.1)
Daily mean °C (°F)	10.7 (51.3)	11.2 (52.2)	13.5 (56.3)	18.0 (64.4)	22.4 (72.3)	26.2 (79.2)	28.9 (84.0)	28.5 (83.3)	26.1 (79.0)	21.9 (71.4)	17.9 (64.2)	13.0 (55.4)	19.9 (67.8)
Mean daily minimum °C (°F)	8.0 (46.4)	8.4 (47.1)	10.6 (51.1)	14.9 (58.8)	19.4 (66.9)	23.1 (73.6)	25.4 (77.7)	25.3 (77.5)	23.1 (73.6)	18.7 (65.7)	14.9 (58.8)	10.0 (50.0)	16.8 (62.3)
Record low °C (°F)	−1.9 (28.6)	−1.1 (30.0)	−0.9 (30.4)	5.5 (41.9)	10.7 (51.3)	13.7 (56.7)	19.9 (67.8)	20.1 (68.2)	14.4 (57.9)	7.7 (45.9)	2.8 (37.0)	−3.6 (25.5)	−3.6 (25.5)
Average precipitation mm (inches)	63.7 (2.51)	85.6 (3.37)	137.6 (5.42)	140.0 (5.51)	189.1 (7.44)	239.5 (9.43)	160.8 (6.33)	218.4 (8.60)	150.2 (5.91)	61.2 (2.41)	71.1 (2.80)	56.5 (2.22)	1,573.7 (61.95)
Average precipitation days (≥ 0.1 mm)	12.0	14.6	17.7	16.3	17.6	15.9	10.7	14.1	12.7	8.6	9.6	10.6	160.4
Average snowy days	0.1	0.2	0.1	0	0	0	0	0	0	0	0	0.1	0.5
Average relative humidity (%)	79	80	81	81	83	84	80	81	80	76	76	76	80
Mean monthly sunshine hours	90.3	81.0	98.7	116.5	128.3	141.5	233.2	205.4	163.7	156.5	107.4	104.9	1,627.4
Percentage possible sunshine	27	25	27	30	31	34	56	51	45	44	33	32	36
Source: China Meteorological Administrationall-time May low

== Administrative divisions ==
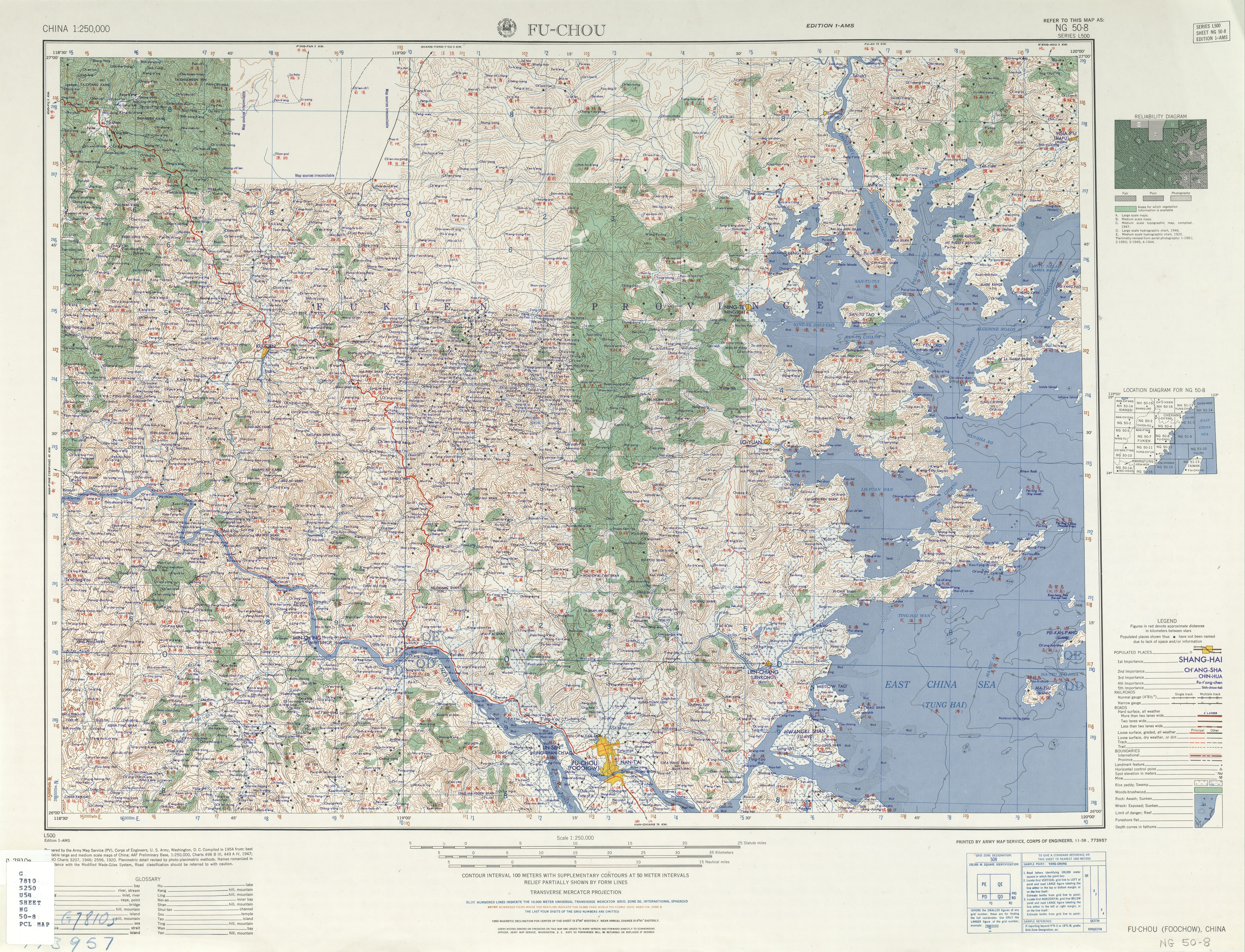
Map including Lianjiang (labeled as LIEN-CHIANG (LIENKONG) 連江) and surrounding region (AMS, 1954)

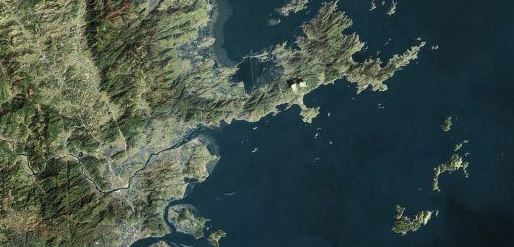
Satellite image including part of Lianjiang County, PRC and part of Lienchiang County, ROC

Lianjiang County Administrative Divisions
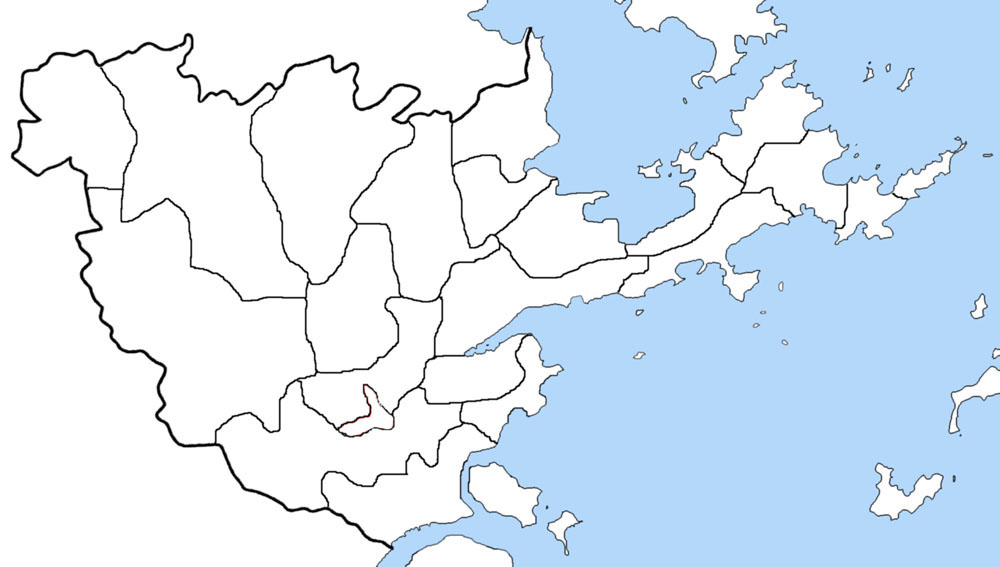

The PRC (China) administers 16 towns and 6 townships:

Towns (镇, zhen):

- Fengcheng (凤城镇) ("Phoenix City Town")
- Mabi (Ma-pi; 马鼻镇) ("Horse Snout Town")
- Danyang (丹阳镇)
- Dongdai (Tungtai; 东岱镇)
- Donghu (东湖镇) ("East Lake Town")
- Guanban (官坂镇) (Traditional: 官阪镇)
- Tailu (T'ai-lu; 苔菉镇)
- Aojiang (敖江镇) ("Ao River Township")
- Pukou (P'u-k'ou; 浦口镇) ("River Mouth Township")
- Toubao (T'ou-pao; 透堡镇)
- Huangqi (Huang-ch'i, Huangchi; 黄岐镇)
- Xiao'ao (Hsiao-ao; 晓澳镇)
- Guantou (Kwantow, Kuan-t'ou; 琯头镇 – Guǎntóu)
- Xiaocheng (Hsiao-ch'eng; 筱埕镇 – Xiǎochéng)
- Changlong (长龙镇, formerly 长龙乡) ("Long Dragon")
- Kengyuan (K'eng-yüan; 坑园镇, formerly 坑园乡)

Townships (乡, xiang):

- Xiagong (Hsia-kung; 下宫乡)
- Xiaocang She Ethnic Township (小沧畲族乡; Traditional: 小滄畲族鄉)
- Ankai (安凯乡)
- Liaoyan (蓼沿乡)
- Pandu (潘渡乡)
- Jiangnan (江南乡)
- Mazu (马祖乡)*

*The People's Republic of China ("Mainland China") claims the Matsu Islands (spelled as Mazu in Hanyu Pinyin), which are de facto under control of the Republic of China (Taiwan), as Mazu township of Lianjiang county.

These townships are divided into 266 villages.

== Culture ==
Residents of Lianjiang – both on the Mainland and Matsu – speak the Lianjiang dialect, a subdialect of the Fuzhou dialect, a branch of Eastern Min. The dialect is also known as Bàng-uâ (平話).

=== Language ===
The Lianjiang dialect is a subdialect of Fuzhou dialect (the most prestigious dialect of Eastern Min). The Lianjiang dialect is mutually intelligible with Fuzhou dialect. It differs from Fuzhou dialect in its tonal sandhi pattern and vowel sandhi system. Small lexical differences also exist on object names, e.g. waxmelon is called "卷瓜" /kuoŋ˨ŋua˦/ in Fuzhou but "冬瓜" /tøyŋ˦ŋua˦/ in Lianjiang.

Generally speaking, the tonal sandhi system of Lianjiang is more conservative than that of Fuzhou, in that the Lianjiang tonal sandhi is still largely controlled by the Middle Chinese tonal registers, while the Fuzhou tonal sandhi shows more deviation and irregularity.

Lianjiang vowel sandhi is more complicated than that of Fuzhou. Both Lianjiang and Fuzhou have systematic vowel variations between citation forms and non-final forms of the same morpheme, e.g. "地" /tei/ "land" – "地主" /ti-tsuo/ "landlord". However, not all morphemes have such variations. Only the morphemes with low-starting tones show such variation. The morphemes with high-starting tones instead only have the more close variant, e.g. "迟" /ti/ "late"- "迟早" /ti tsia/ "early or late". However, some cognates are produced with different vowels in Lianjiang and Fuzhou, e.g. "江 river" is produced as /kyeŋ/ in Lianjiang, but /kouŋ/ in Fuzhou. Also, the rimes in Lianjiang are generally more close and front than that in Fuzhou, which is especially salient in the open vowels, e.g. "下 down" is [ɑ] in Fuzhou, but [a] in Lianjiang.

Surrounded by mountains, Lianjiang used to be a relatively isolated from the inland part of China for centuries. This explains why the Lianjiang phonological system is relatively more conservative. However, with the construction of the high-speed railway system and the improvement of tunnel system, northern migrants are flooding into Lianjiang in the past decade, which may bring language contact into perspective. Just like in Fuzhou, most young or middle-aged Lianjiang speakers speak Mandarin Chinese fluently, but usually with a local accent influenced by the local dialect. However, due to the misleading language policy (Not speaking Mandarin Chinese is taken as "immoral".) and disadvantageous status of the dialect, both Fuzhou and Lianjiang dialects are losing speakers in the youngest generation. More and more young people and children are only receptive bilinguals in Lianjiang.

== Economy ==
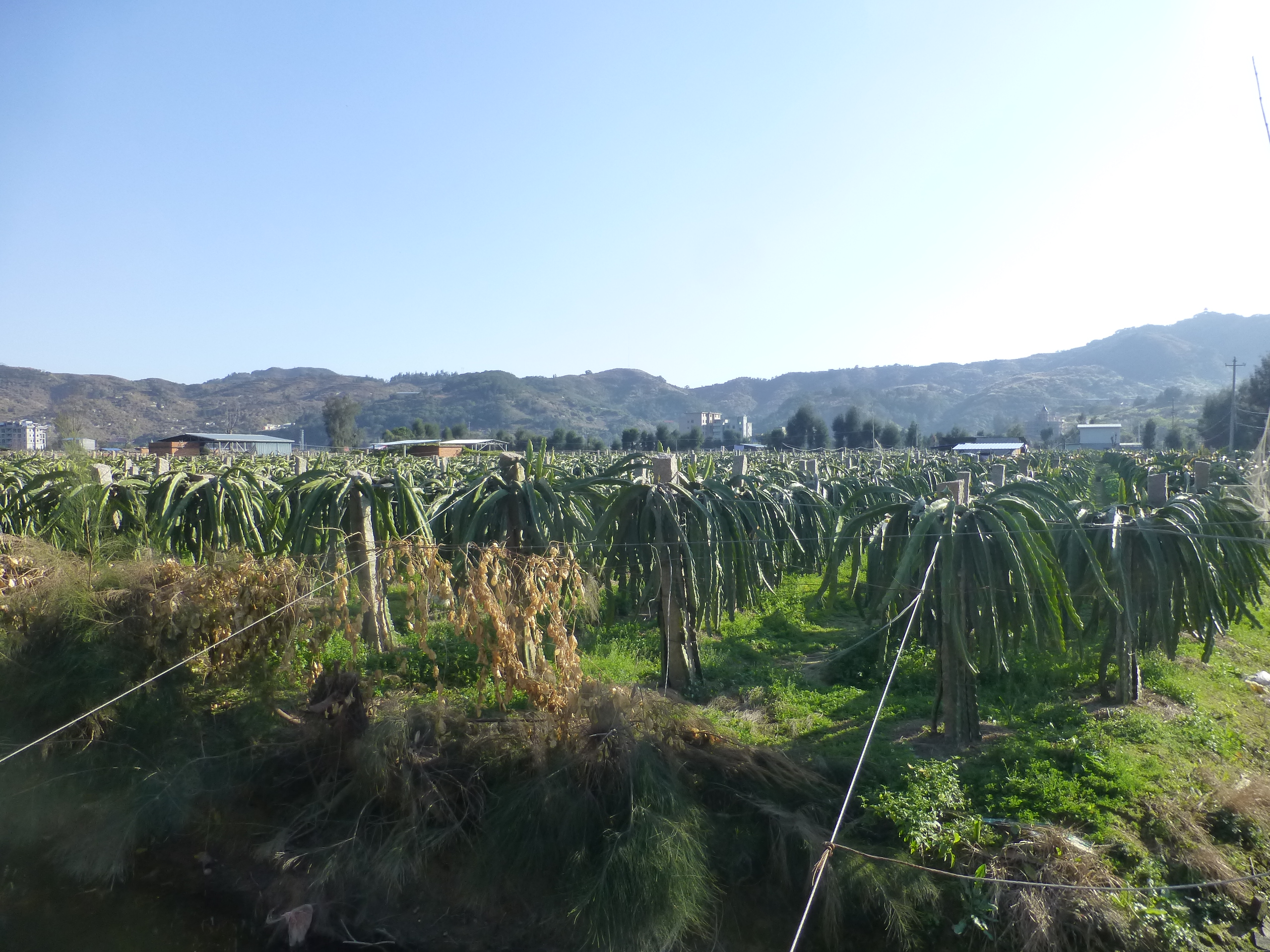
A field of red-fleshed dragon-fruit cactus in Dongdai town

Food products:

- Farm: loquats, rice, sweet potato, bean, cotton, sugar cane, tea plant, jasmine, watermelon, mushroom, grapes, dragon fruit, rhubarb.
- Sea: hairtail, shad, pomfret, cuttlefish, garoupa, prawn, crab, clam, mudskippers.
- Other: Yuanhong wine ("元紅")

== Transportation ==
Luochang Expressway runs through Lianjiang's section of National Highway 104 in 500.3 kilometres (310.9 mi). 42.6-kilometre (26.5 mi) navigable river length.

Guantou and Kemen (可門) are the largest seaports in Lianjiang with national access.

Lianjiang railway station is serviced by the Wenzhou-Fuzhou railway, preceded by Luoyuan and followed by Fuzhou South.

== Tourism ==
There are hot springs in Gui'an (貴安) and Tanghui (湯尾) of Pandu. There is a Dragon King Palace-Temple (龍宮廟) in the Xiaocang She Ethnic Township.

== Notable persons ==
- Chen Di, Ming philologist, strategist, and traveler
- Huang Rulun
- Zheng Sixiao (Cheng Suu-hsiao; 鄭思肖)
