= Fu'an railway station =

Railway station in Ningde, China

Coordinates: 26°50′18″N 119°42′58″E

Fu'an 福安
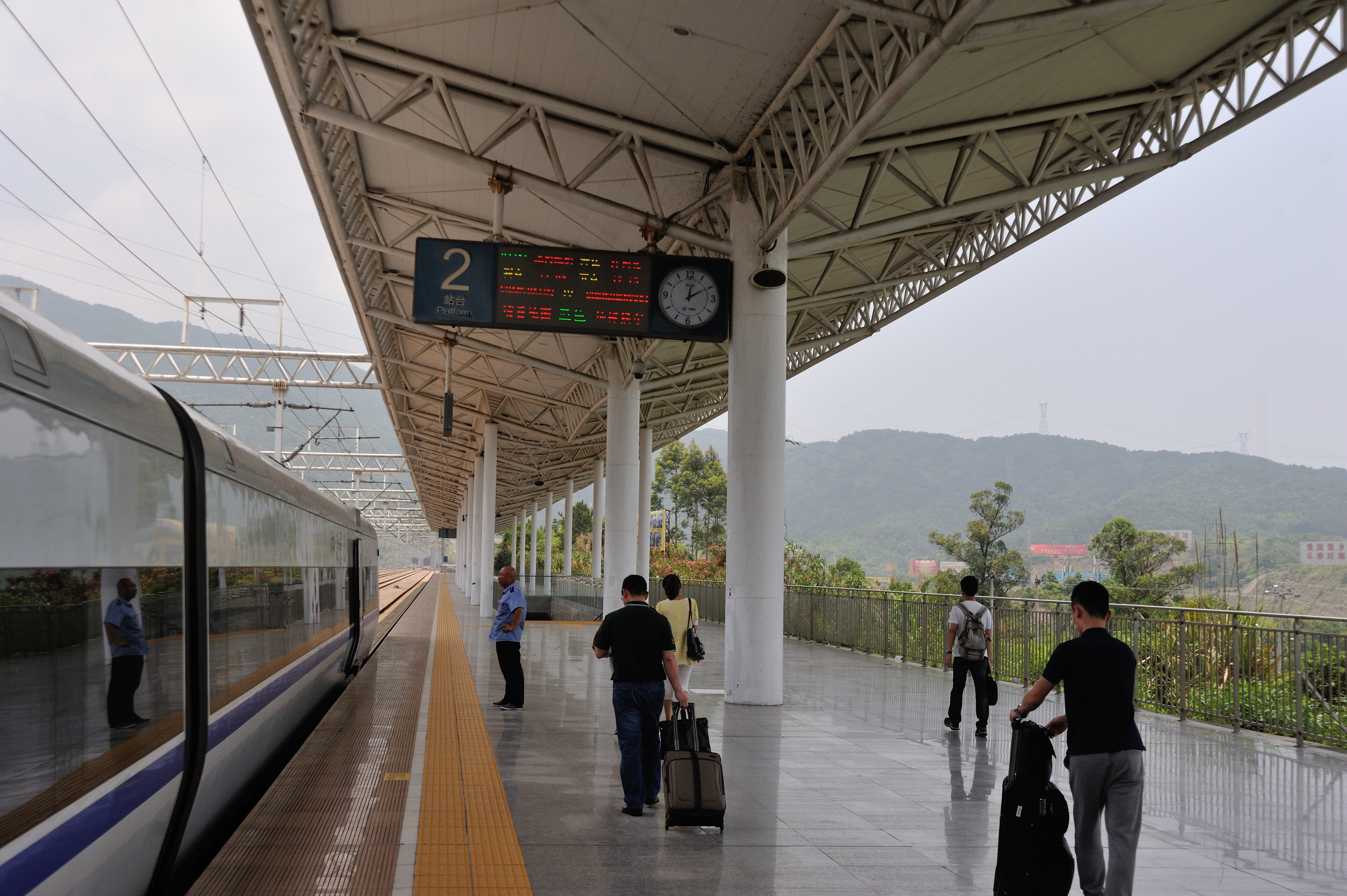
- Fu'an Railway Station platform

General information
- Location: Fu'an, Ningde, Fujian Province; China
- Operated by: China Railway Nanchang Group, China Railway Corporation
- Line: Wenzhou–Fuzhou railway

Fu'an railway station is a railway station located in Fu'an, Ningde, Fujian Province, China, on the Wenzhou–Fuzhou railway which operated by China Railway Nanchang Group, China Railway Corporation. This is a passenger and freight station.

Preceding station	China Railway High-speed	Following station
Xiapu towards Wenzhou South	Wenzhou–Fuzhou railway	Ningde towards Fuzhou South
