= Cangnan railway station =

Railway station in Wenzhou, China

Coordinates: 27.5311°N 120.4072°E

Cangnan 苍南
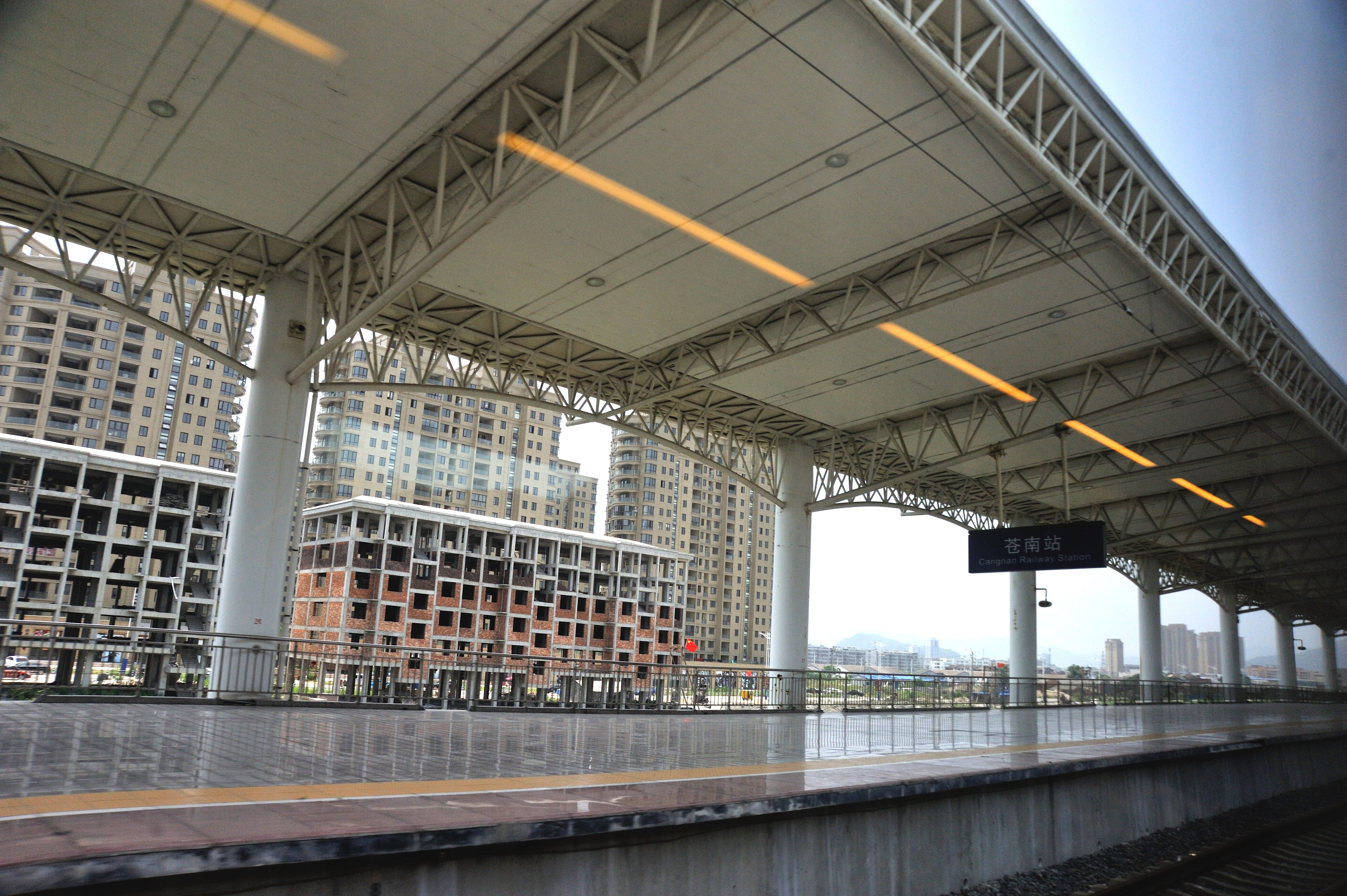
- Cangnan Railway Station platform 02

General information
- Location: Cangnan County, Wenzhou, Zhejiang; China
- Operated by: Shanghai Railway Bureau, China Railway Corporation
- Line: Wenzhou–Fuzhou railway

History
- Opened: 28 September 2009
Location

Cangnan railway station is a railway station located in Cangnan County, Wenzhou, Zhejiang Province, China, on the Wenzhou–Fuzhou railway which operated by Shanghai Railway Bureau, China Railway Corporation. There is a freight handling facility nearby.

== History ==
On September 8, 2009, Cangnan Station accepted the completion acceptance of Zhejiang Coastal Railway Co., Ltd.; on September 28 of the same year, with the opening of Wenfu Railway, Cangnan Station was officially opened for operation; on December 20 of the same year, Cangnan Station started running the first train.

In 2020, it underwent a renovation.

| Preceding station | China Railway High-speed | Following station |
|---|---|---|
| Pingyang towards Wenzhou South | Wenzhou–Fuzhou railway | Fuding towards Fuzhou South |
