= Xiapu railway station =

Railway station in Ningde, China

Coordinates: 26.9124°N 120.0280°E

Xiapu 霞浦
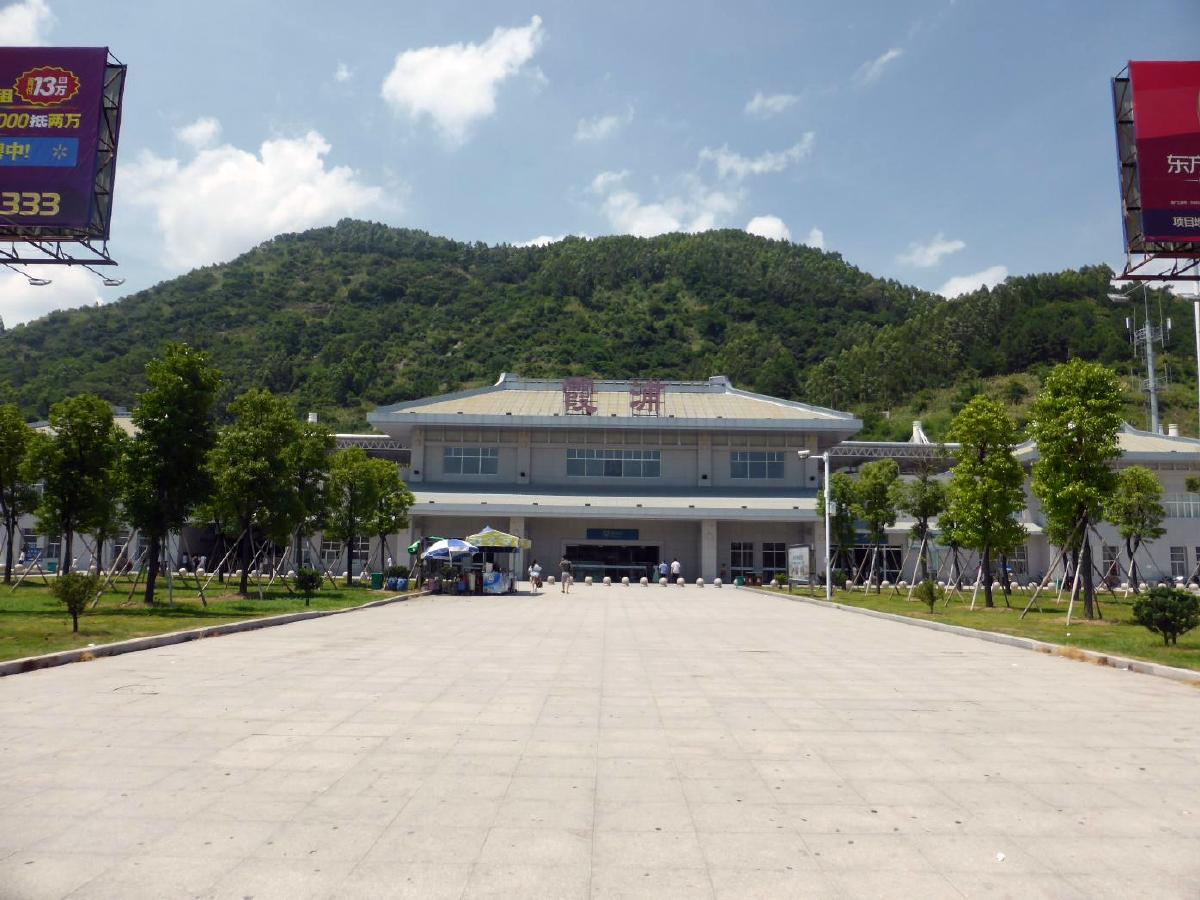

General information
- Location: Xiapu County, Ningde, Fujian; China
- Operated by: Nanchang Railway Bureau, China Railway Corporation
- Line(s): Wenzhou-Fuzhou Railway

Xiapu railway station (Chinese: 霞浦站) is a railway station located in Xiapu County, Ningde City, Fujian Province, China, on the Wenzhou-Fuzhou Railway operated by Nanchang Railway Bureau, China Railway Corporation.

Preceding station	China Railway High-speed	Following station
Taimushan towards Wenzhou South	Wenzhou–Fuzhou railway	Fu'an towards Fuzhou South
