= Fuding railway station =

Railway station in Fuding, China

Coordinates: 27.28286°N 120.19017°E

Fuding 福鼎
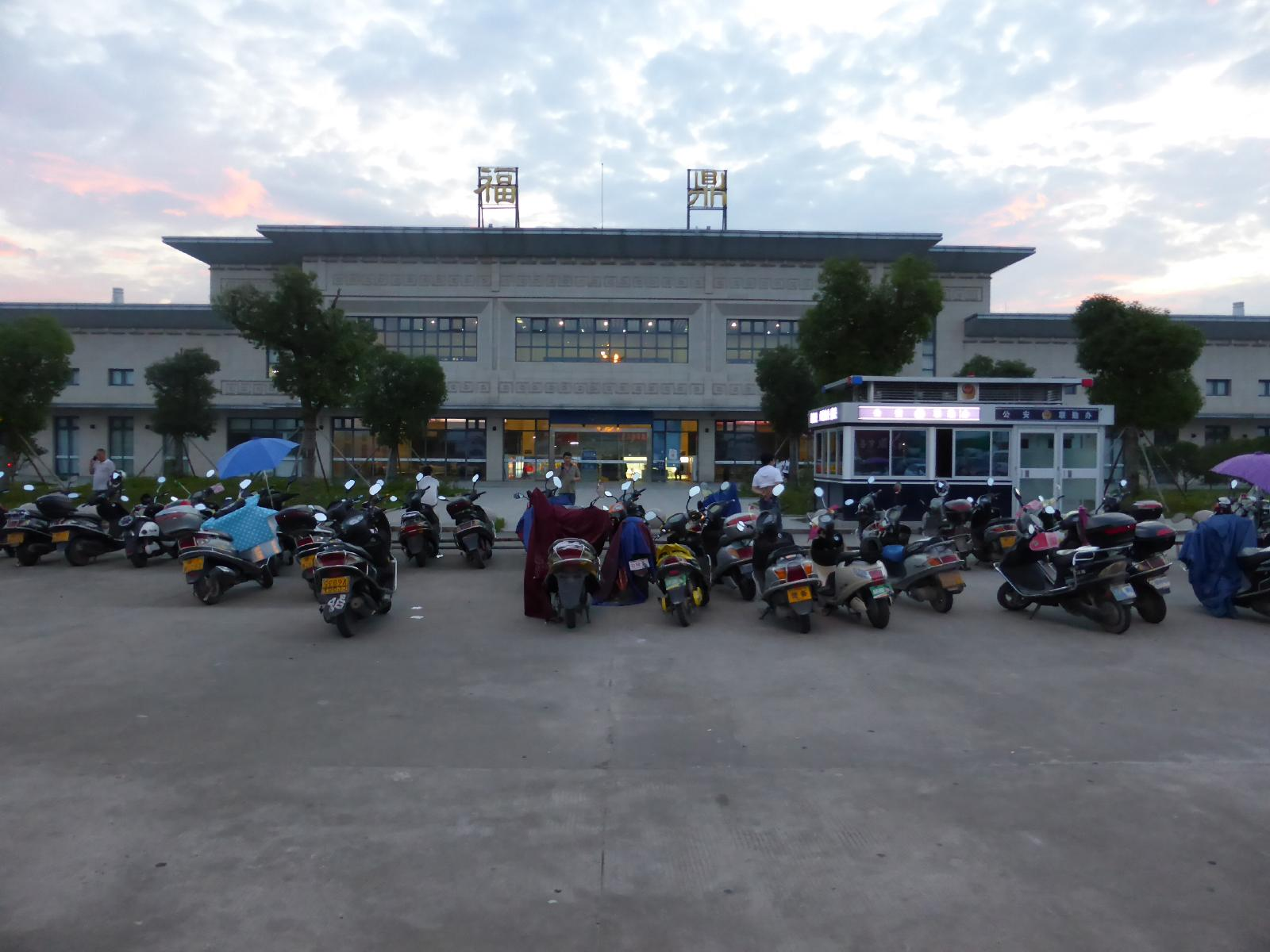
- Fuding Station front entrance

General information
- Location: Fuding, Fujian; China
- Operated by: Nanchang Railway Bureau, China Railway Corporation
- Line(s): Wenzhou-Fuzhou Railway

Fuding railway station (Chinese: 福鼎站) is a railway station located in Fuding City, Ningde, Fujian Province, China, on the Wenzhou-Fuzhou Railway operated by the Nanchang Railway Bureau, China Railway Corporation.

Preceding station	China Railway High-speed	Following station
Cangnan towards Wenzhou South	Wenzhou–Fuzhou railway	Taimushan towards Fuzhou South
