= Taimushan railway station =

Railway station in Fuding, Fujian Province, China

Coordinates: 27.3081°N 120.1944°E

Taimushan 太姥山
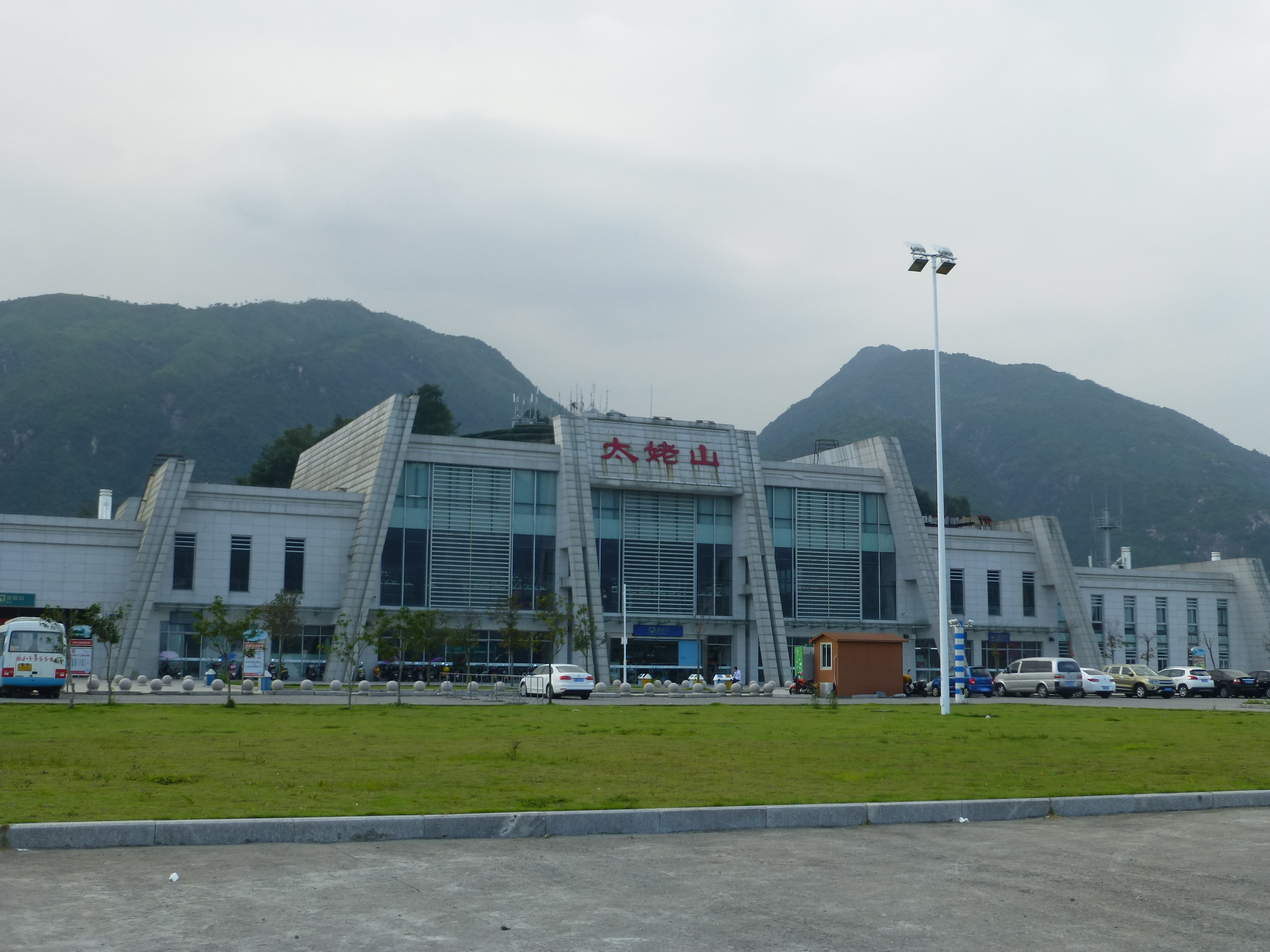

General information
- Location: Fuding, Ningde, Fujian Province; China
- Operated by: Nanchang Railway Bureau, China Railway Corporation
- Line(s): Wenzhou-Fuzhou Railway

Taimushan railway station (Chinese: 太姥山站; pinyin: Tàimǔshān zhàn; lit. 'Taimu Mountain railway station') is a railway station located in Fuding, Ningde, Fujian Province, China, on the Wenzhou-Fuzhou Railway operated by the Nanchang Railway Bureau, China Railway Corporation.

== See also ==
- Mount Taimu

Preceding station	China Railway High-speed	Following station
Fuding towards Wenzhou South	Wenzhou–Fuzhou railway	Xiapu towards Fuzhou South
