= Ao River =

The Ao River could mean:

- Ao River (Zhejiang) (鳌江) in Zhejiang, China
- Ao River (Fujian) (敖江) in Fujian, China
