= Rui'an railway station =

Railway station in China

Rui'an 瑞安
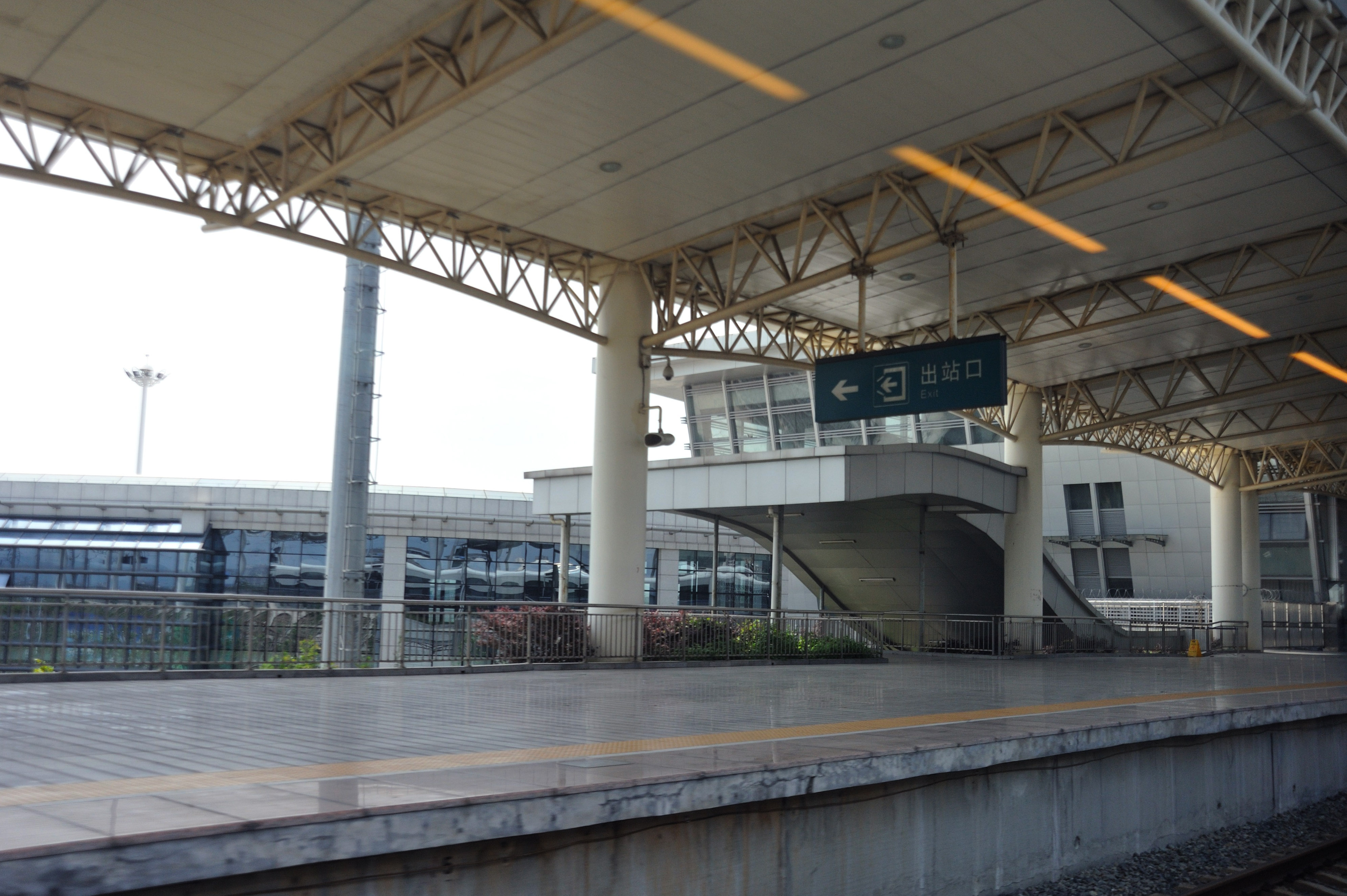

General information
- Location: Rui'an, Wenzhou, Zhejiang; China
- Coordinates: 27°46′11.62″N 120°34′35.57″E
- Operator: Shanghai Railway Bureau, China Railway Corporation
- Line: Wenzhou–Fuzhou railway
Location

Rui'an railway station is a railway station located in Zhejiang Province, People's Republic of China, on the Wenzhou–Fuzhou railway which is operated by Shanghai Railway Bureau, China Railway Corporation.

| Preceding station | China Railway High-speed | Following station |
|---|---|---|
| Wenzhou South Terminus | Wenzhou–Fuzhou railway | Pingyang towards Fuzhou South |
