= Fu'an =

Fu'an 福安市 Fuan
- County-level city
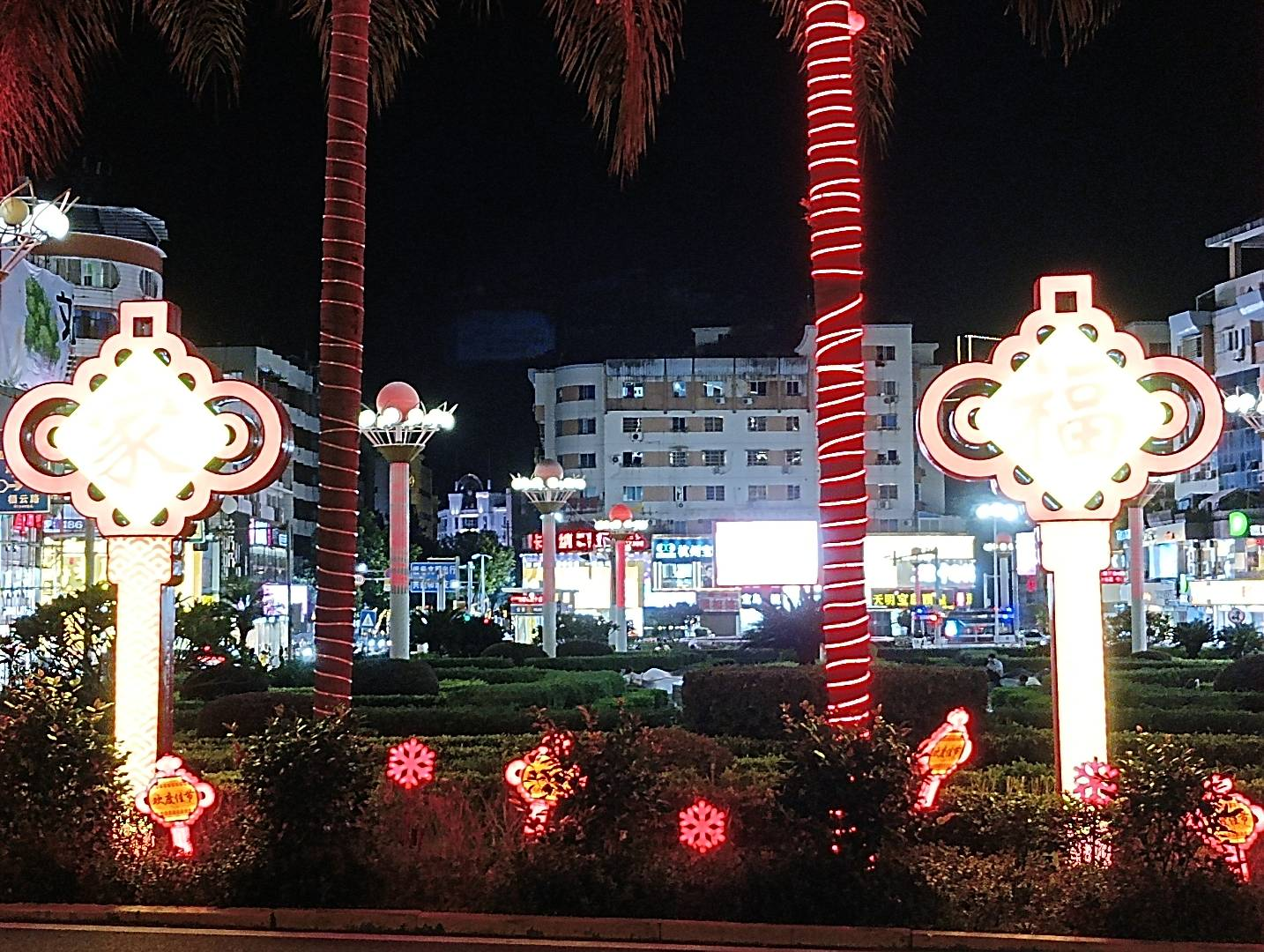
- Fu'an 福安 Municipal Square

- Location in Fujian
- Coordinates: 27°06′N 119°38′E
- Country: People's Republic of China
- Province: Fujian
- Prefecture-level city: Ningde

Area
  - County-level city: 67.44 km^{2} (26.04 sq mi)

Population (2020)
  - County-level city: 609,779
  - Density: 9,042/km^{2} (23,420/sq mi)
  - Urban: 397,068
  - Rural: 212,711
- Time zone: UTC+8 (China Standard)
- Postal code: 355000
- Area code: 0593
- Region GDP of 68.041 billion Yuan (2021) with an increase of 6.2% year-on-year. Total general public budget revenue of 6.259 billion yuan in 2021, an increase of 22.2% year-on-year.

Fu'an (Fu'an; Chinese: 福安市; pinyin: Fú'ān Shì; Foochow Romanized: Hók-ăng-chê; sometimes Fu An) is a county-level city of Ningde prefecture level city, in northeast Fujian province, PRC, some 150 kilometres (93 mi) North of the provincial capital Fuzhou. Fuzhou and Fu'an of Ningde prefecture along with Cangnan county-level city of Wenzhou prefecture in Zhejiang province make up the Min Dong linguistic and cultural region of China. Fu'an along with Fuzhou and the Eastern Min region are the closest geographically to the nearby Matsu Islands which are an archipelago of 36 islands within the Lienchiang county of Taiwan.

During the first imperial Qin dynasty (221 BC–206 BC), Fu'an was a part of the ancestral homeland of the Min Yue tribes and was named as Minzhong County. During the Han dynasty, Fu'an belonged to the area of Min Yueguo. In 1245 of the Song dynasty, Fu'an county was established and classified as Yongle and Linghuo townships. During the previous government of Republic of China, Fu'an was administered as 3 townships and 32 districts. After the establishment of the current government, the People's Republic of China, Fu'an was reorganized into 14 townships.

As of October 2022, the current administration of Fu'an has 4 cities, 13 towns, 2 townships, 3 ethnic townships, and 2 township-level units.

The primary cultural attractions in Fu'an City are Lionfeng temple, Fu'an Baiyun Mountains, Liancun, Quigang Pavilion, Nishita, Fu'an Huang's Ancestral Hall Temple, and Muyun She Ethnic Township District.

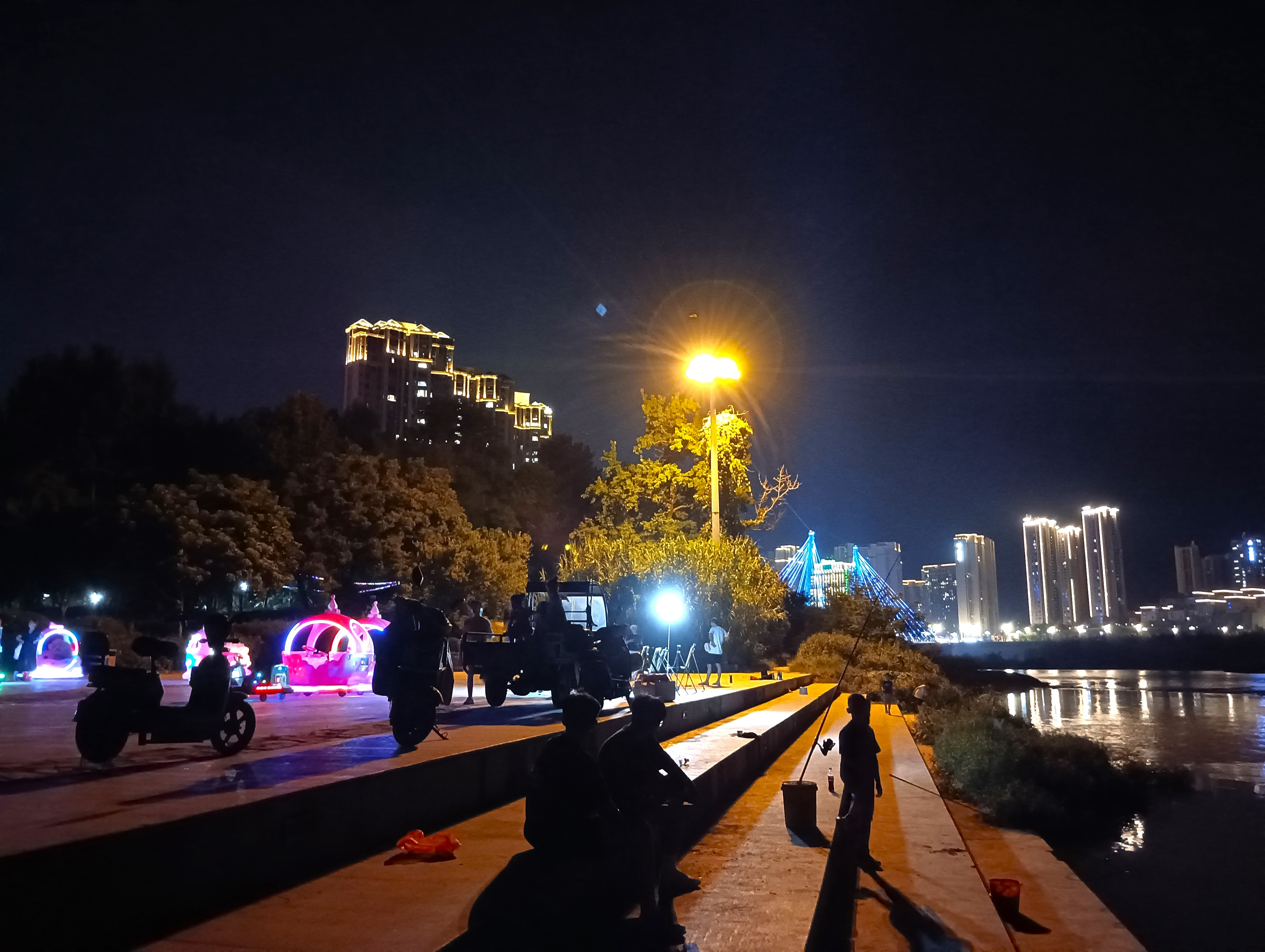
Fu'an City overlooking the Jiaoxi river with Qiyun bridge illuminated in the background

== History ==
=== Found ===
Fu'an county was found in 1245 AD in the Southern Song.

=== Modern ===
In civil war of China, Fu'an was occupied by People's Liberation Army in July 1949. In November 1989, Fu'an county was abolished, at the same time Fu'an city was established.

In 2019, Fu'an DongBai City (Chinese: 福安东百城; pinyin: Fú'ān dōng bǎi chéng) opened on Fuchun Avenue in Fu'an. It is located in the newly developed business district across from Qiyun Bridge. The large urban project was developed by DongBai Group as the central point for urban commerce in Fu'an.

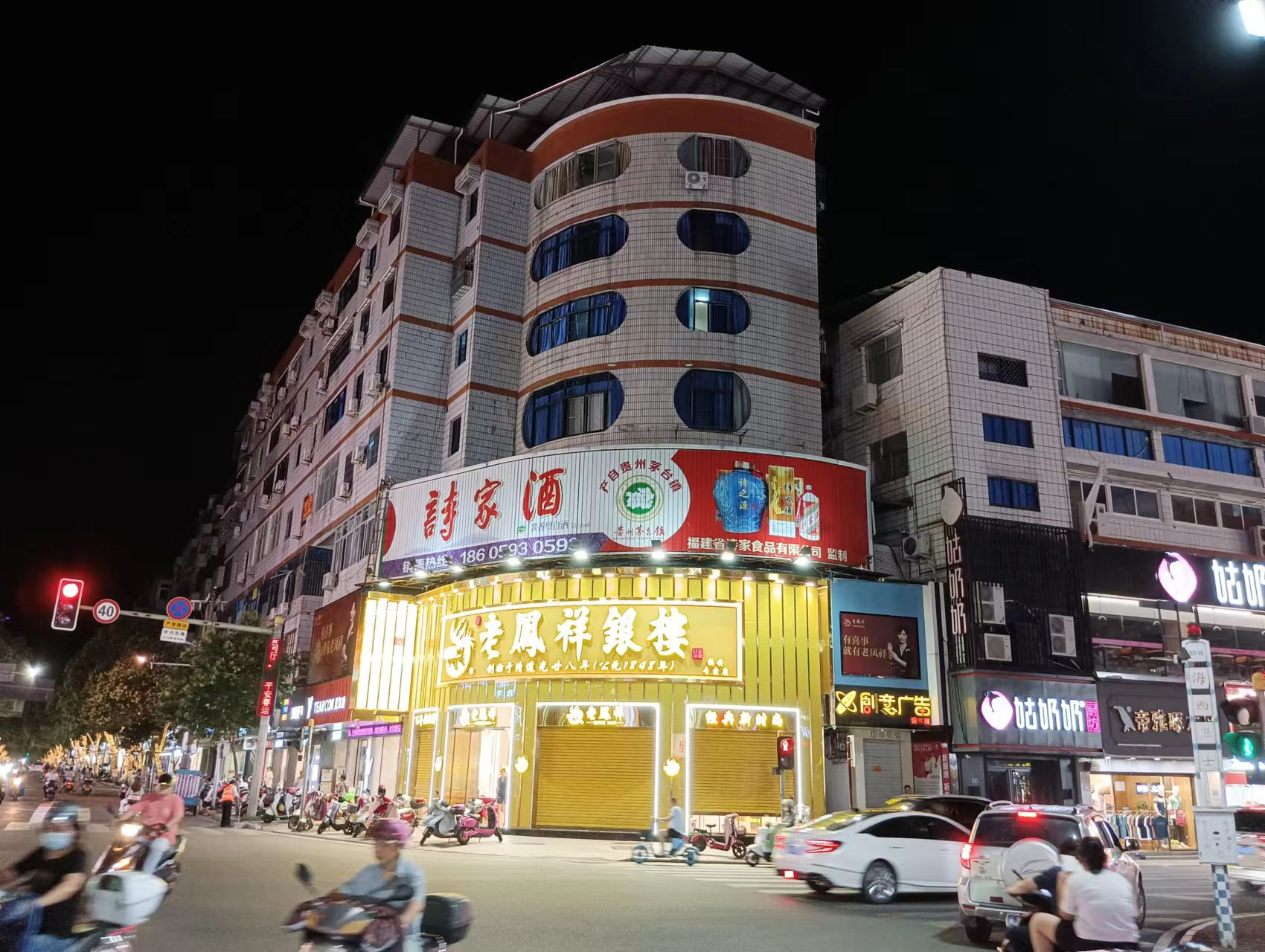
Typical intersection in Fu'an City

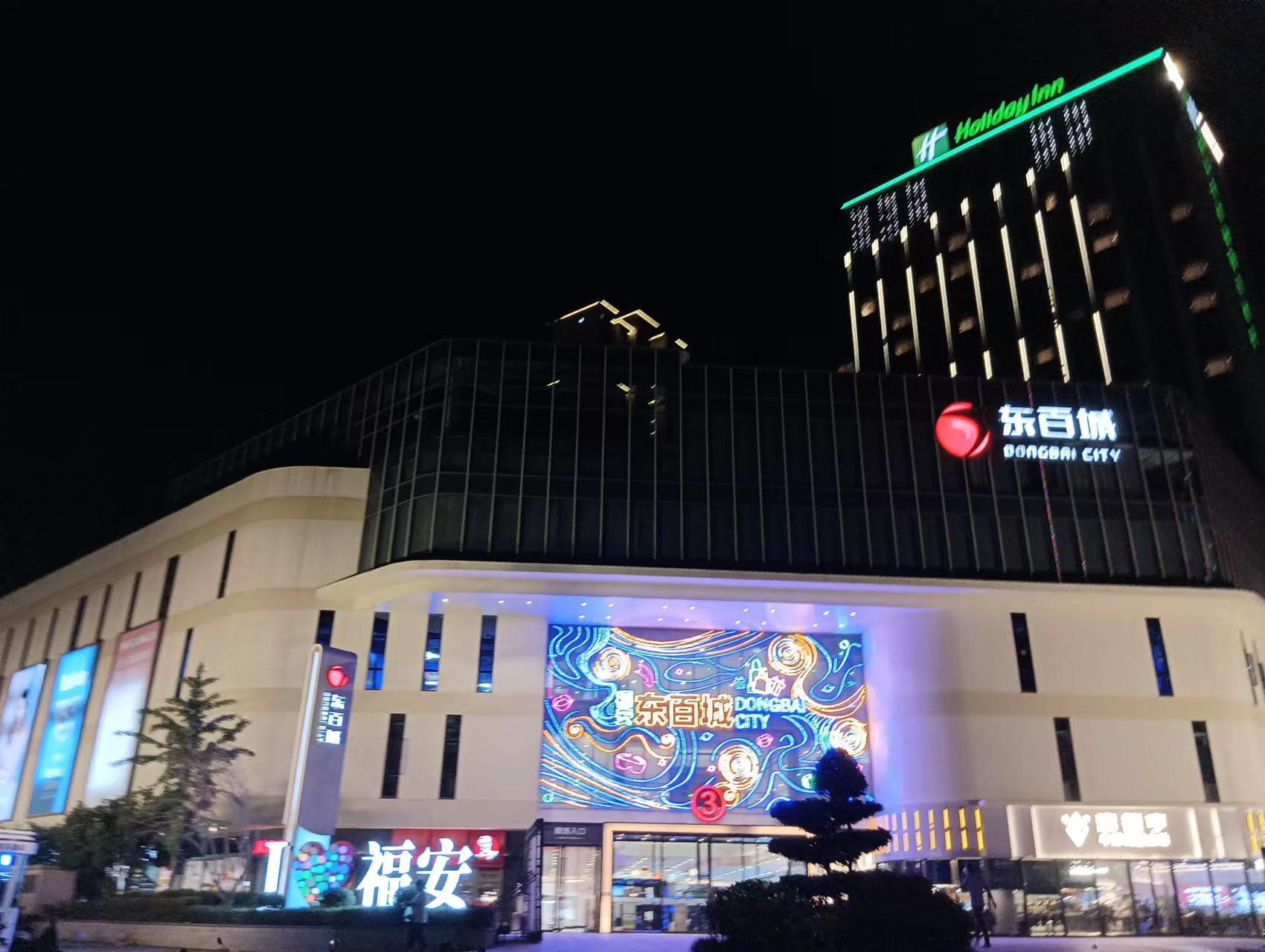
Fú'ān dōng bǎi chéng (福安 东百城)

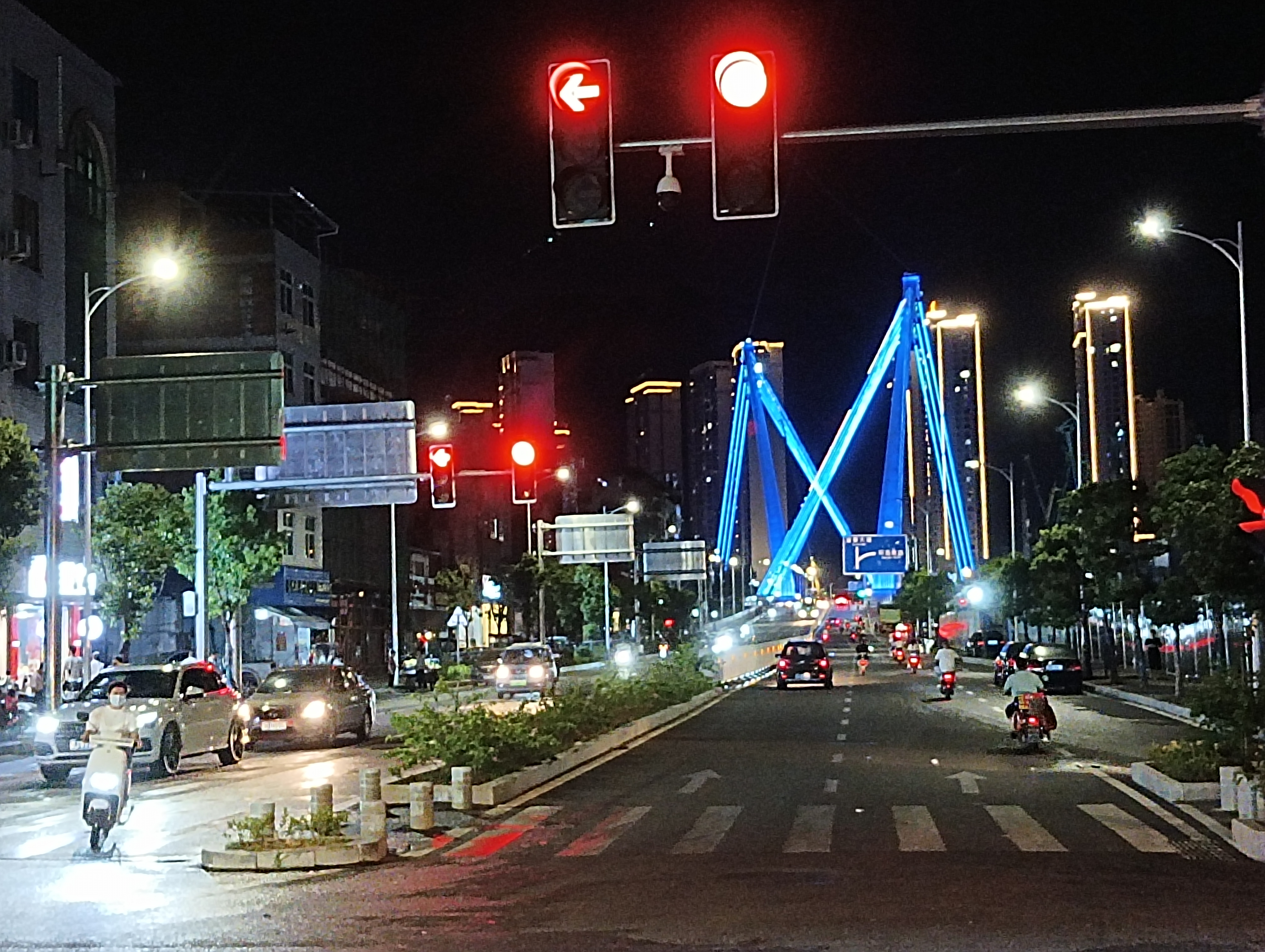
Qiyun Bridge(栖云桥) at nighttime, Fu'an Dong Bai is directly West across the bridge

== Geography ==
Fu'an is surrounded by hills and the sea. It covers an area of 67.44 square kilometres (26.04 sq mi).

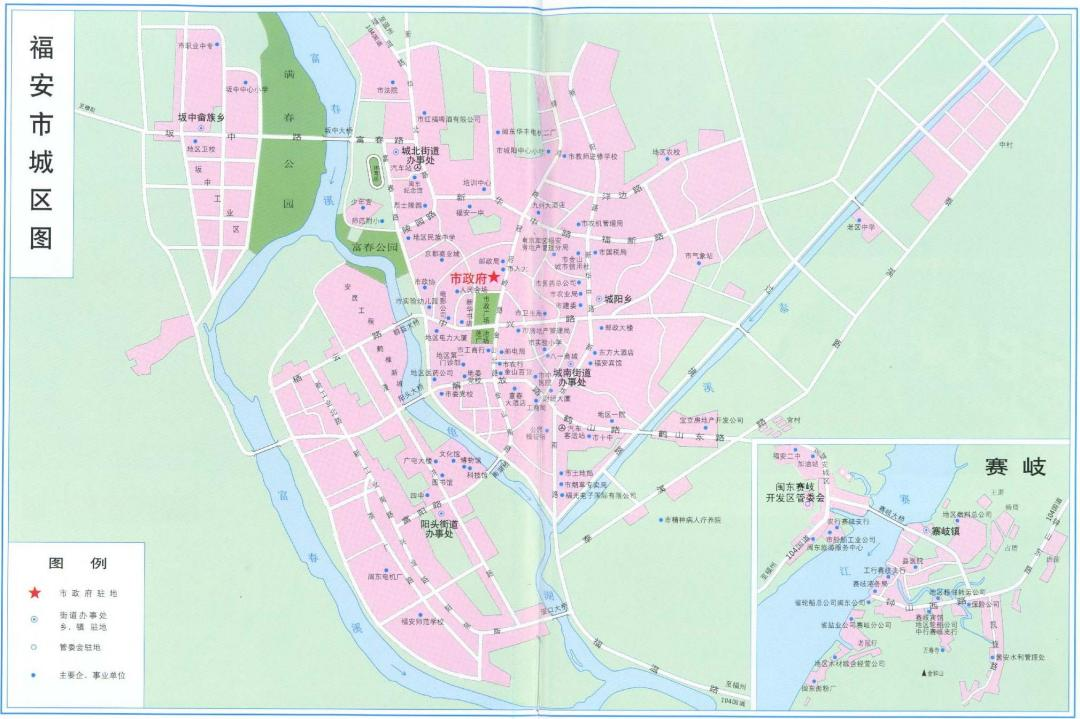
Topographic map of Fu'an City

== Climate ==
Climate data for Fu'an, elevation 51 m (167 ft), (1991–2020 normals, extremes 1981–2010)
Month	Jan	Feb	Mar	Apr	May	Jun	Jul	Aug	Sep	Oct	Nov	Dec	Year
Record high °C (°F)	27.2 (81.0)	30.2 (86.4)	36.1 (97.0)	35.0 (95.0)	37.1 (98.8)	38.6 (101.5)	41.9 (107.4)	39.9 (103.8)	39.7 (103.5)	36.1 (97.0)	34.5 (94.1)	28.6 (83.5)	41.9 (107.4)
Mean daily maximum °C (°F)	15.3 (59.5)	16.5 (61.7)	19.3 (66.7)	24.3 (75.7)	28.1 (82.6)	31.1 (88.0)	34.9 (94.8)	34.3 (93.7)	31.5 (88.7)	27.3 (81.1)	22.5 (72.5)	17.6 (63.7)	25.2 (77.4)
Daily mean °C (°F)	10.4 (50.7)	11.4 (52.5)	14.1 (57.4)	18.8 (65.8)	23.0 (73.4)	26.4 (79.5)	29.3 (84.7)	28.7 (83.7)	26.2 (79.2)	21.8 (71.2)	17.3 (63.1)	12.3 (54.1)	20.0 (67.9)
Mean daily minimum °C (°F)	7.3 (45.1)	8.2 (46.8)	10.7 (51.3)	15.1 (59.2)	19.4 (66.9)	23.1 (73.6)	25.5 (77.9)	25.1 (77.2)	22.6 (72.7)	18.0 (64.4)	13.7 (56.7)	8.8 (47.8)	16.5 (61.6)
Record low °C (°F)	−2.5 (27.5)	−2.6 (27.3)	−2.1 (28.2)	4.3 (39.7)	9.5 (49.1)	13.3 (55.9)	20.1 (68.2)	19.4 (66.9)	13.7 (56.7)	7.4 (45.3)	1.8 (35.2)	−4.3 (24.3)	−4.3 (24.3)
Average precipitation mm (inches)	61.1 (2.41)	87.2 (3.43)	159.0 (6.26)	147.6 (5.81)	209.9 (8.26)	303.2 (11.94)	158.4 (6.24)	222.4 (8.76)	140.4 (5.53)	50.8 (2.00)	58.0 (2.28)	53.1 (2.09)	1,651.1 (65.01)
Average precipitation days (≥ 0.1 mm)	12.3	13.6	17.7	16.2	17.3	18.4	12.7	16.7	12.6	7.4	9.1	9.7	163.7
Average snowy days	0.3	0.4	0.1	0	0	0	0	0	0	0	0	0.2	1
Average relative humidity (%)	76	77	78	77	78	81	75	77	75	72	75	74	76
Mean monthly sunshine hours	99.4	91.2	102.4	121.3	127.1	131.1	216.2	198.5	166.6	161.6	120.3	117.4	1,653.1
Percentage possible sunshine	30	29	27	32	30	32	51	49	45	46	37	36	37
Source: China Meteorological Administration

== Demographics ==
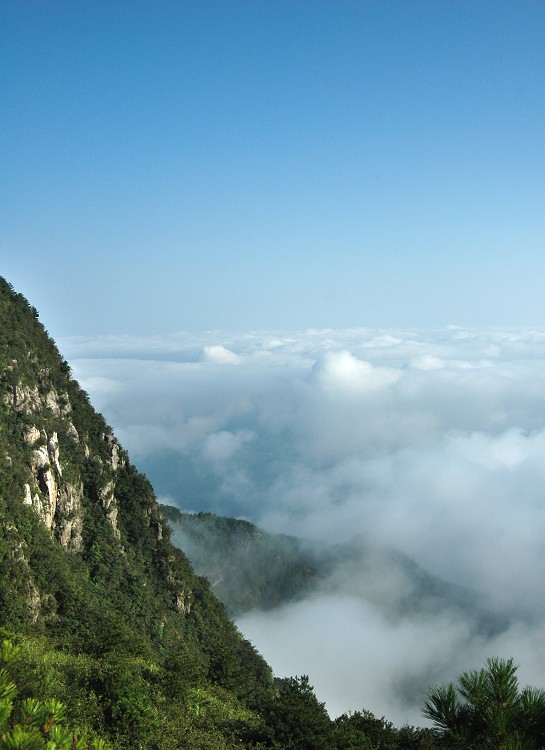
Baiyun Mountains in Fu'an

By December 2021, Fu'an has 676,624 residents. With 199031 households.

Fu'an City is mainly composed of three ethnic groups: Han Chinese, She and Hui. The city is predominately Han like rest of China but there is also an old Hui community with a sizeable presence. The largest minority ethnic group is the She with a population accounting for 11% of Fu'an. The Han population in Fu'an include the Tanka people of which there currently are about 7,400.

The local Fu'an dialect is part of Eastern Min which belongs to the Mindong cultural group along with Fuzhou. The She ethnic group speak a separate She language.

The major religion in Fu'an city is Buddhism. Taoism and other Chinese folk beliefs are also popular. Catholic and Protestant believers account for 14% of the total population. There are 47 Roman Catholic and Protestant churches around the city.

== Intangible Cultural Sights ==
Fu'an Baiyun Mountains (福安白云山) is located in the northwest of Fu'an City, covering an area of 67 square kilometers. It is a geological park and ranked as a national tourist attraction that is an intangible part of Fu'an. The Baiyun Mountain Scenic Area is most characterized by river valley stone mortar groups, granite canyons, deep meandering flow landforms and volcanic rock landforms.

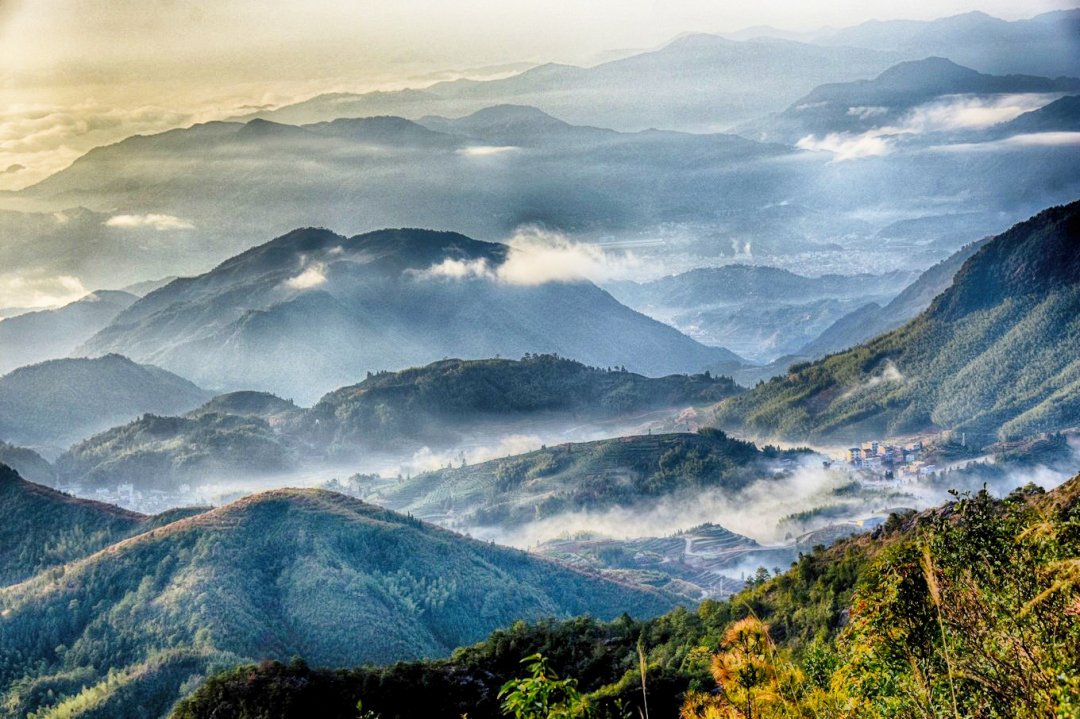
Fu'an Baiyun Mountains

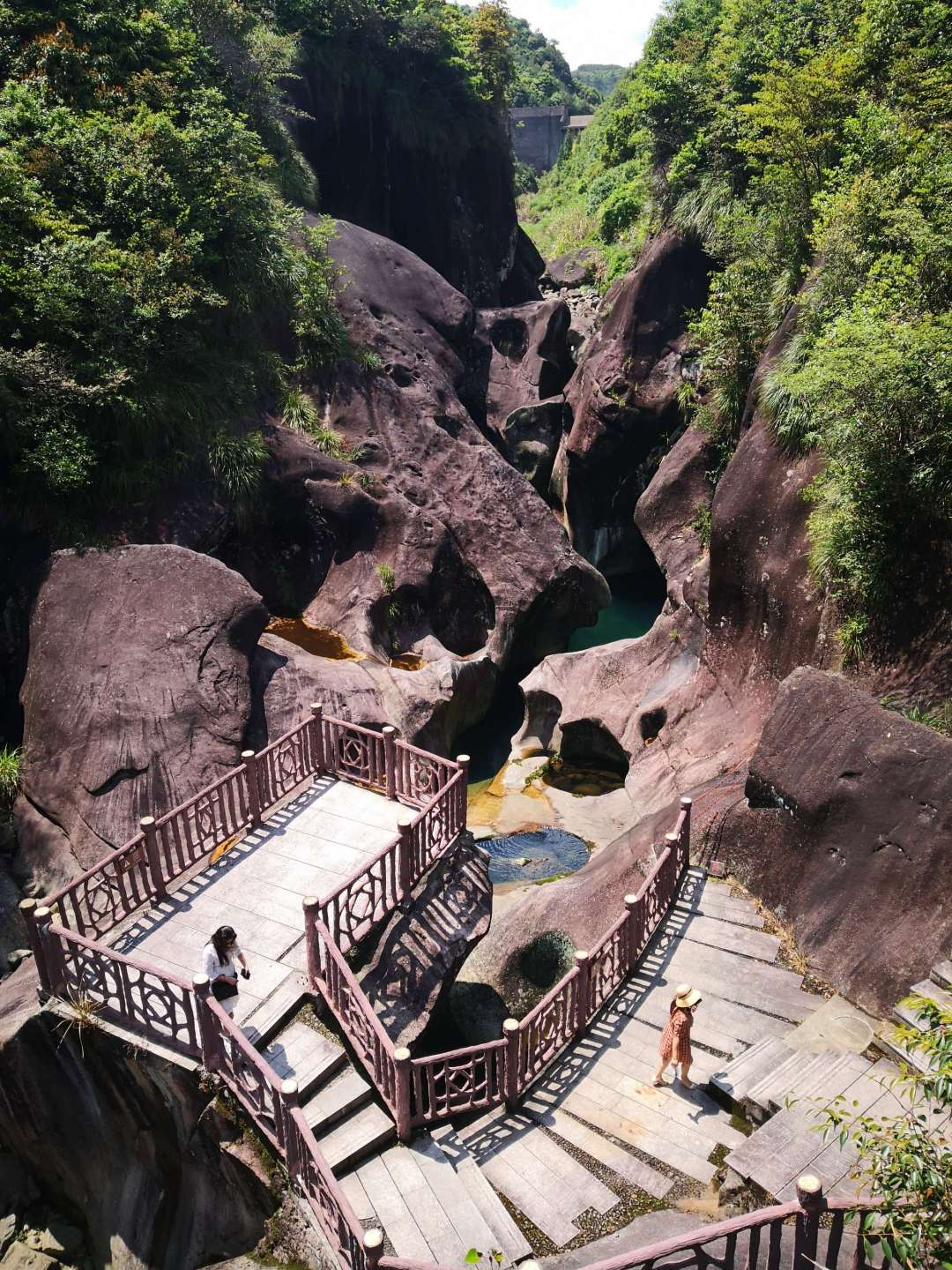
Walking path of Baiyun Mountains in Fu'an

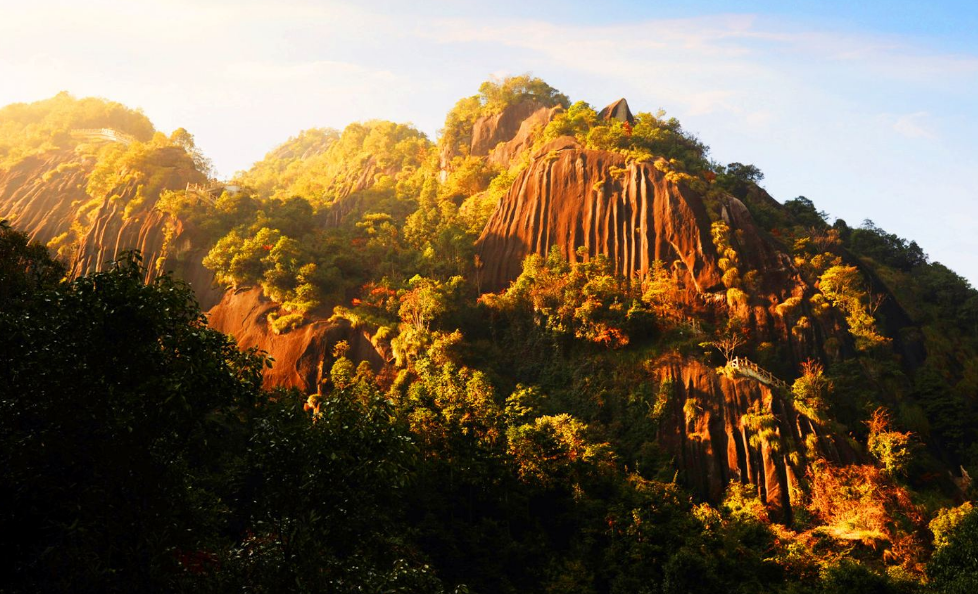
Fu'an Baiyun Mountains

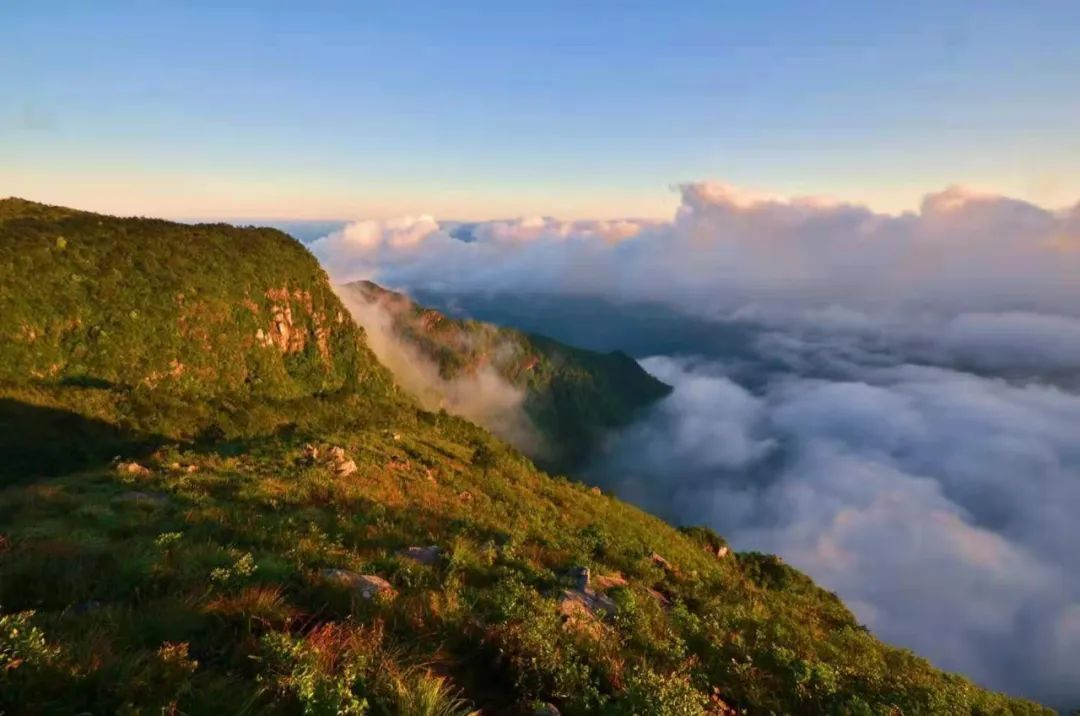
Peak of Fu'an Baiyun Mountains

== Economy ==
In 2021, Fu'an achieved regional GDP of 68.41 billion yuan, a year-on-year increase of 6.2%. The per capita disposable income of all residents was 35,375 yuan, an increase of 11.2% year-on-year.

The three leading industries in Fu'an are the electrical machinery industry, the shipbuilding industry and the food industry. There are more than 730 electrical machinery companies, 84 shipping companies, and more than 800 food processing companies. The main food crops in mountainous and hilly areas are double-season rice and sweet potato. In addition, a variety of economic crops are also planted in coastal plains and valley basins, mainly sugarcane, grapes, edible mushrooms, tea, peaches, bamboo, as well as aquaculture.

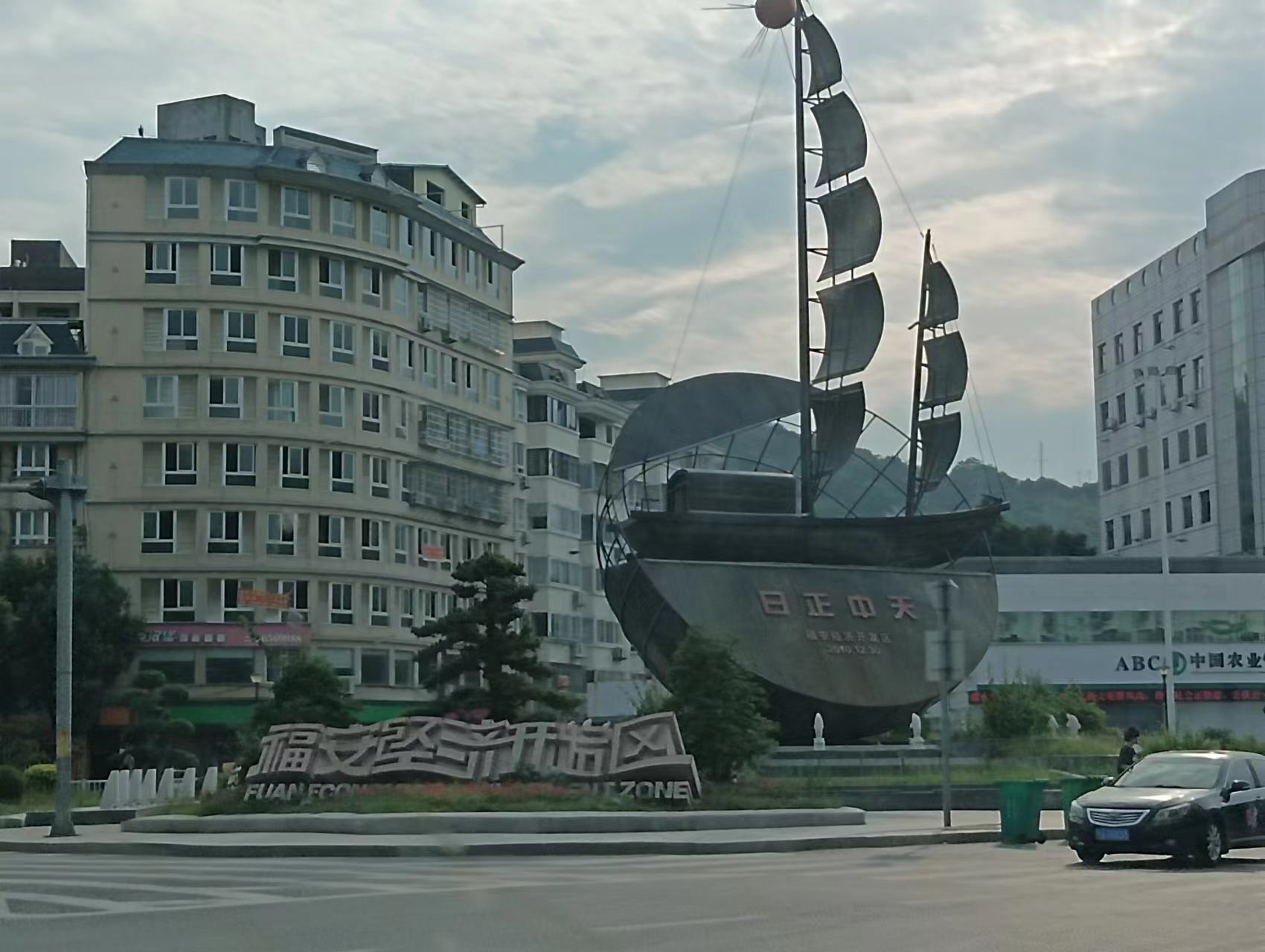
Fu'an Special Economic Zone (福安经济开发区)

Fu'an is known for its local tea production. One successful local company is the Tan Yang Kunfu tea, which won the first prize gold medal award in the Panama Pacific International Exposition world's fair. Besides tea, the local agricultural sector is specialized in grape varieties such as wine grapes and table grapes, aquaculture and animal husbandry.

== Education and Work ==
One of the first Anglo-Chinese kindergartens was established in Fu'an in 2002.

In 2021, secondary education schools in Fu'an City enrolled 156,700 students and 30,900 graduates. In that same year, there were 5,096 new employees in Fu'an City, 2,523 urban unemployed people were re-employed, and 473 urban employment difficulties were managed. The unemployment rate was controlled within 4.14%.

In 2021, Fu'an Enterprise Pension, Work Injury Insurance, Unemployment Insurance, Urban and Rural Residents Pension Insurance, and Institutional Institutions Pension Insurance Enrollment were 140,398, 99,485, 68,008, 351,400, and 17,991,000 respectively. In terms of social security, the system coverage rate reached 100%, and 1,332 people received unemployment insurance benefits, an increase of 601 people year-on-year.

== Transport ==
=== Road ===
- China National Highway 104
- China National Highway 228
- G15 Shenyang–Haikou Expressway
- G1523 Yongguan Expressway
- G1514 Ningde–Shangrao Expressway
- G4012 Lining Expressway

=== Water ===
Fu'an is located on the middle stream of the Jiaoxi River (交溪), the main tributary of the Baima River (白马河).

Fu'an is known for the Baima Harbor (白馬港), which also bears the name "Golden Passage".

=== Railway ===
- Fu'an Railway Station on the Wenzhou–Fuzhou railway, located near Wanwu Town (湾坞镇), over 30 km (19 mi) south from Fu'an's main urban area.

== Administration ==
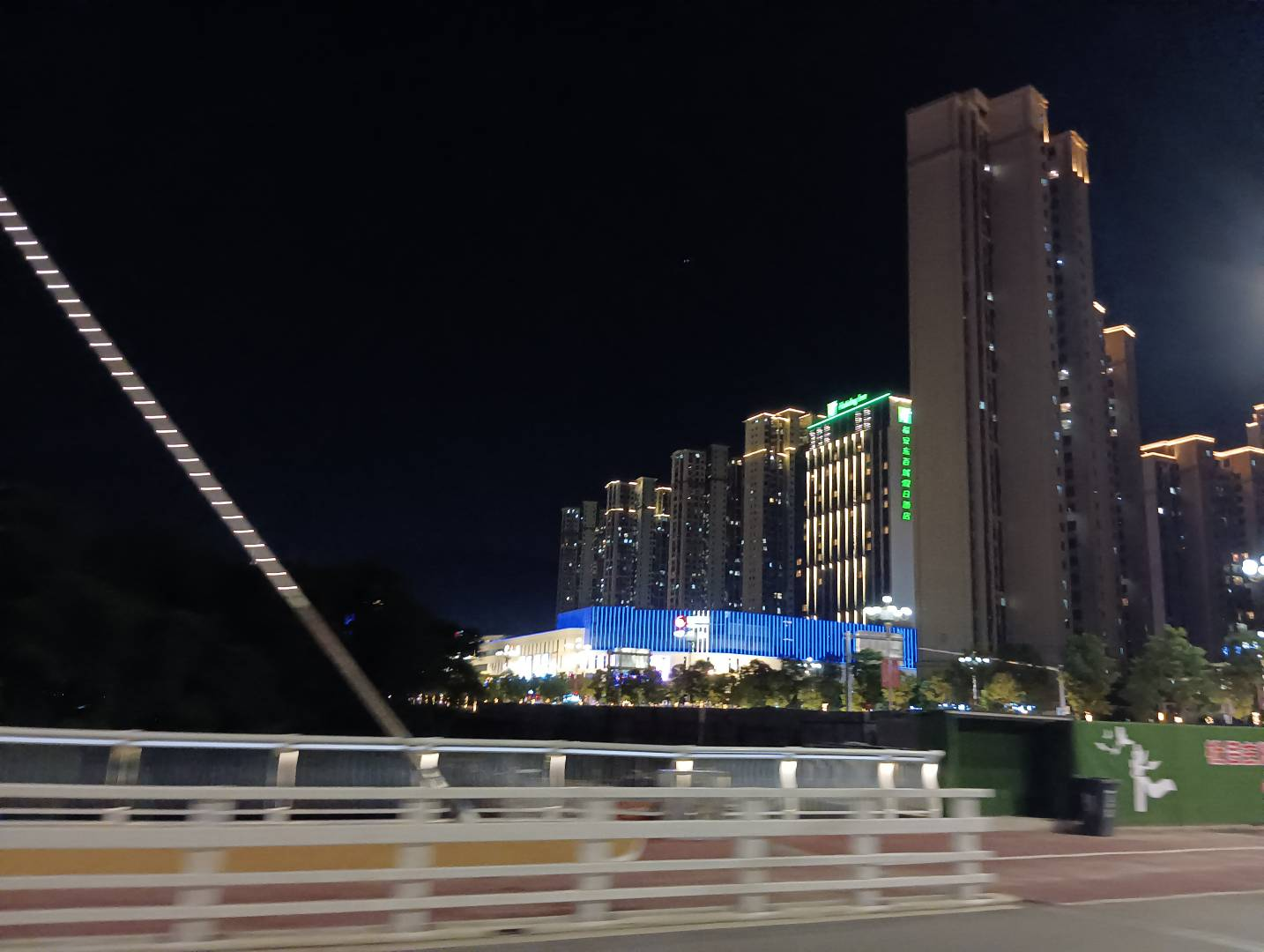
River crossing into Dong Bai district within Fu'an

Fu'an has 4 street committees; the city's executive, legislature and judiciary are in Chengnan, together with its CPC and PSB branches. The city has 13 towns and 5 townships, of which three are zoned Affirmative action-like for the She nation natives.

=== Subdistricts ===
Chinese: 街道; pinyin: Jiēdào

- Chengbei (城北街道)
- Dong Bai City (东百城)
- Chengnan (城南街道)
- Yangtou (陽頭街道)
- Luojiang (羅江街道)

=== Towns ===
Chinese: 镇; pinyin: zhèn

- Muyang (穆阳镇)
- Shangbaishi (上白石镇)
- Xitan (溪潭镇)
- Xiabaishi (下白石镇)
- Saiqi (赛岐镇)
- Xiwei (溪尾镇)
- Shekou (社口镇)
- Tantou (潭头镇)
- Xiaoyang (晓阳镇)
- Xibing (溪柄镇)
- Gantang (甘棠镇)
- Chengyang (城阳鎮)
- Wanwu (灣塢鎮)

=== Townships and Ethnic Townships ===
Chinese: 乡; pinyin: xiāng

- Songluo (松罗乡)
- Fankang (范坑乡)

Chinese: 民族乡; pinyin: mínzú xiāng

- Kangcuo She (康厝畲族乡)
- Muyun She (穆云畲族乡)
- Banzhong She (坂中畲族乡)

== Notable people ==
- Saint Francis Ferdinand de Capillas, who was martyred here

== See also ==
- Ningde
- Fujian
- Wenzhou
