= Banzhong She Ethnic Township =

Banzhong Township 坂中乡
- Ethnic township
- 坂中畲族乡; Banzhong She Ethnic Township
- Location in Fujian
- Coordinates: 27°05′53″N 119°38′00″E
- Country: China
- Province: Fujian
- Prefecture-level city: Ningde
- County-level city: Fu'an
- Villages: 19

Area
  - Total: 67.7 km^{2} (26.1 sq mi)
- Elevation: 26 m (85 ft)

Population (2000)
  - Total: 21,980
  - Density: 325/km^{2} (841/sq mi)
- Time zone: UTC+8 (China Standard)
- Postal code: 355000
- Area code: 0593

Banzhong She Ethnic Township (simplified Chinese: 坂中畲族乡; traditional Chinese: 坂中畲族鄉; pinyin: Bǎnzhōng Shēzú Xiāng) is a township of Fu'an City, northeastern Fujian Province, People's Republic of China. It is one of the three such divisions established for the city's population of the She people, alongside Muyun (穆云畲族乡) and Kangcuo (康厝畲族乡) Townships.

It is the closest of the three to the city centre, lying just 2.5 kilometres (1.6 mi) upstream from it on the west or right bank of the Jiao River (交溪). The township's administrative area ranges in latitude from 26° 02' to 27° 10' N and in longitude from 119° 34' 10" to 119° 40' 40".
