= Luoyuan railway station =

Railway station in Fujian, China

Coordinates: 26.4558°N 119.5761°E

Luoyuan 罗源
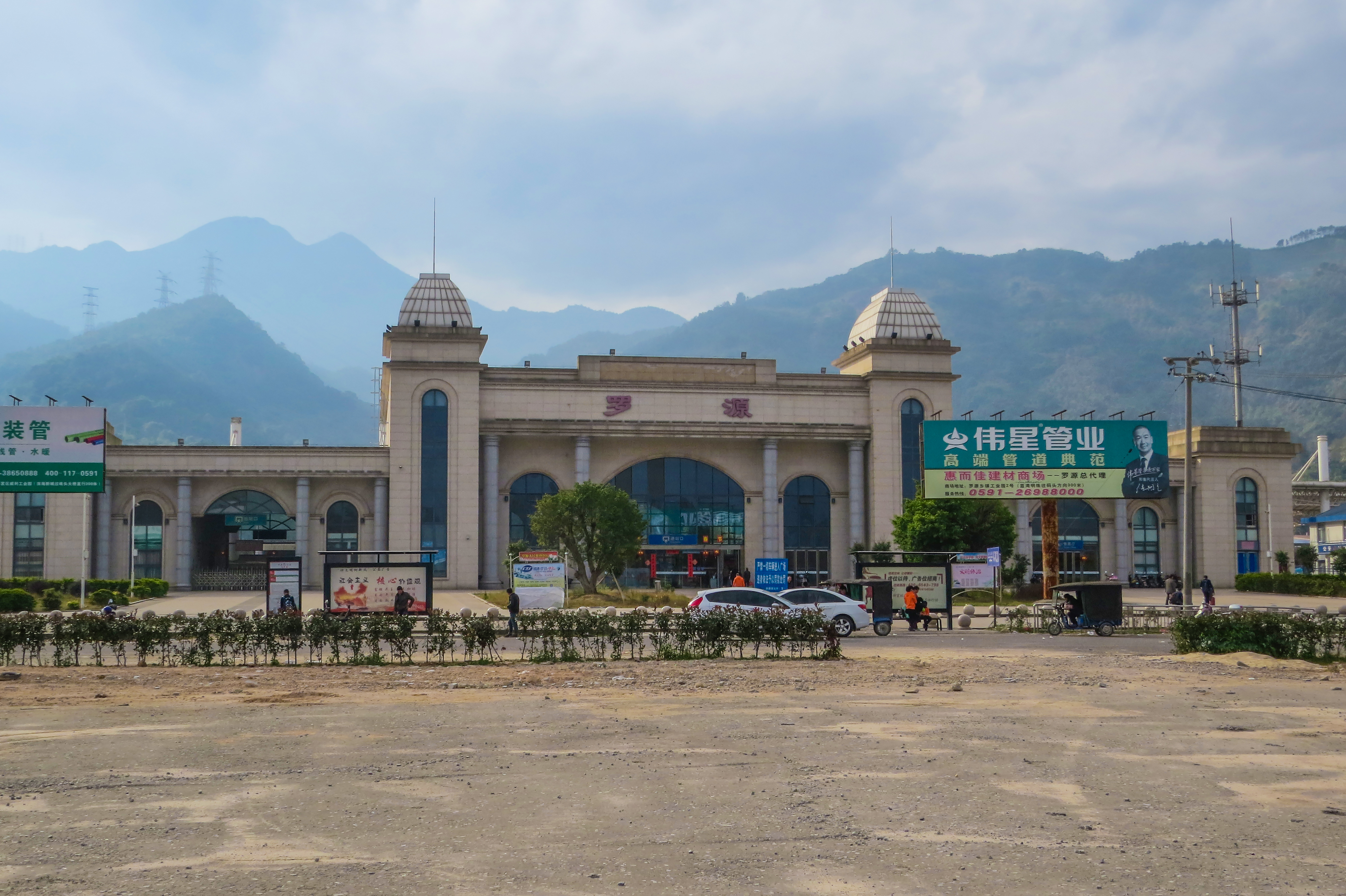
- Station building in January 2017

General information
- Location: Songshan, Luoyuan, Fuzhou, Fujian; China
- Operated by: Nanchang Railway Bureau, China Railway Corporation
- Line(s): Wenzhou–Fuzhou Railway

Luoyuan railway station (Chinese: 罗源站) is a railway station located in Luoyuan County, Fujian Province, China, on the Wenzhou–Fuzhou Railway operated by the Nanchang Railway Bureau, China Railway Corporation.

Preceding station	China Railway High-speed	Following station
Ningde towards Wenzhou South	Wenzhou–Fuzhou railway	Lianjiang towards Fuzhou South
