= Fengcheng, Lianjiang County =

Fengcheng 凤城镇
- Town
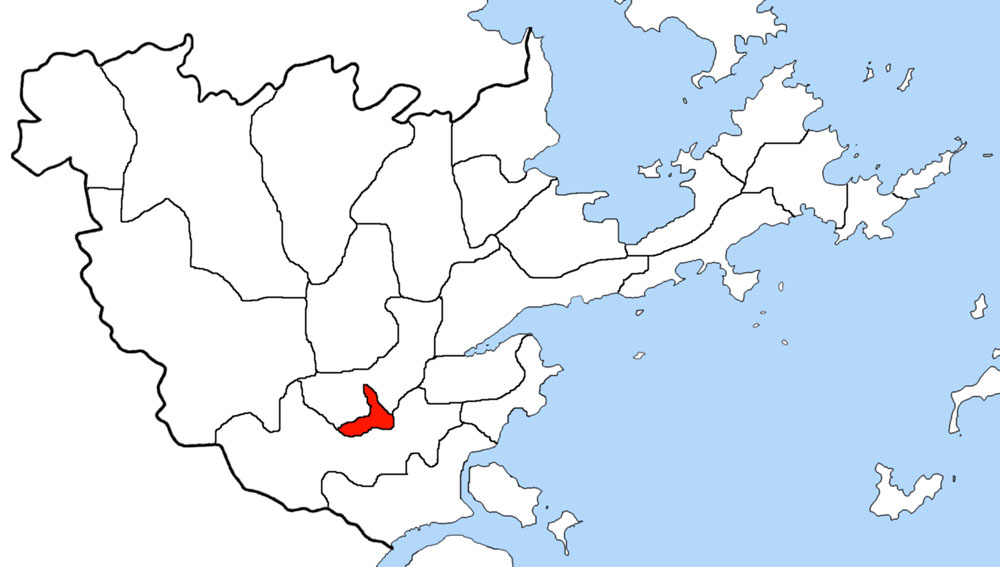
- Location in Lianjiang County

- Location in Fujian Fengcheng (China)
- Coordinates: 26°11′51″N 119°32′23″E
- Country: People's Republic of China
- Province: Fujian
- Prefecture-level city: Fuzhou
- County: Lianjiang
- Time zone: UTC+8 (China Standard)

Fengcheng (simplified Chinese: 凤城; traditional Chinese: 鳳城; pinyin: Fèngchéng) is a town in northeastern Fujian province, People's Republic of China, located along the Taiwan Strait coast in Lianjiang County, of which it is the county seat. The provincial capital, Fuzhou, lies 48 kilometres (30 mi) to the southwest. The name of the town literally means, "Phoenix City."

== See also ==
- List of township-level divisions of Fujian
