= Pingyang railway station =

Railway station in Wenzhou, China

Coordinates: 27.6294°N 120.5405°E

Pingyang 平阳
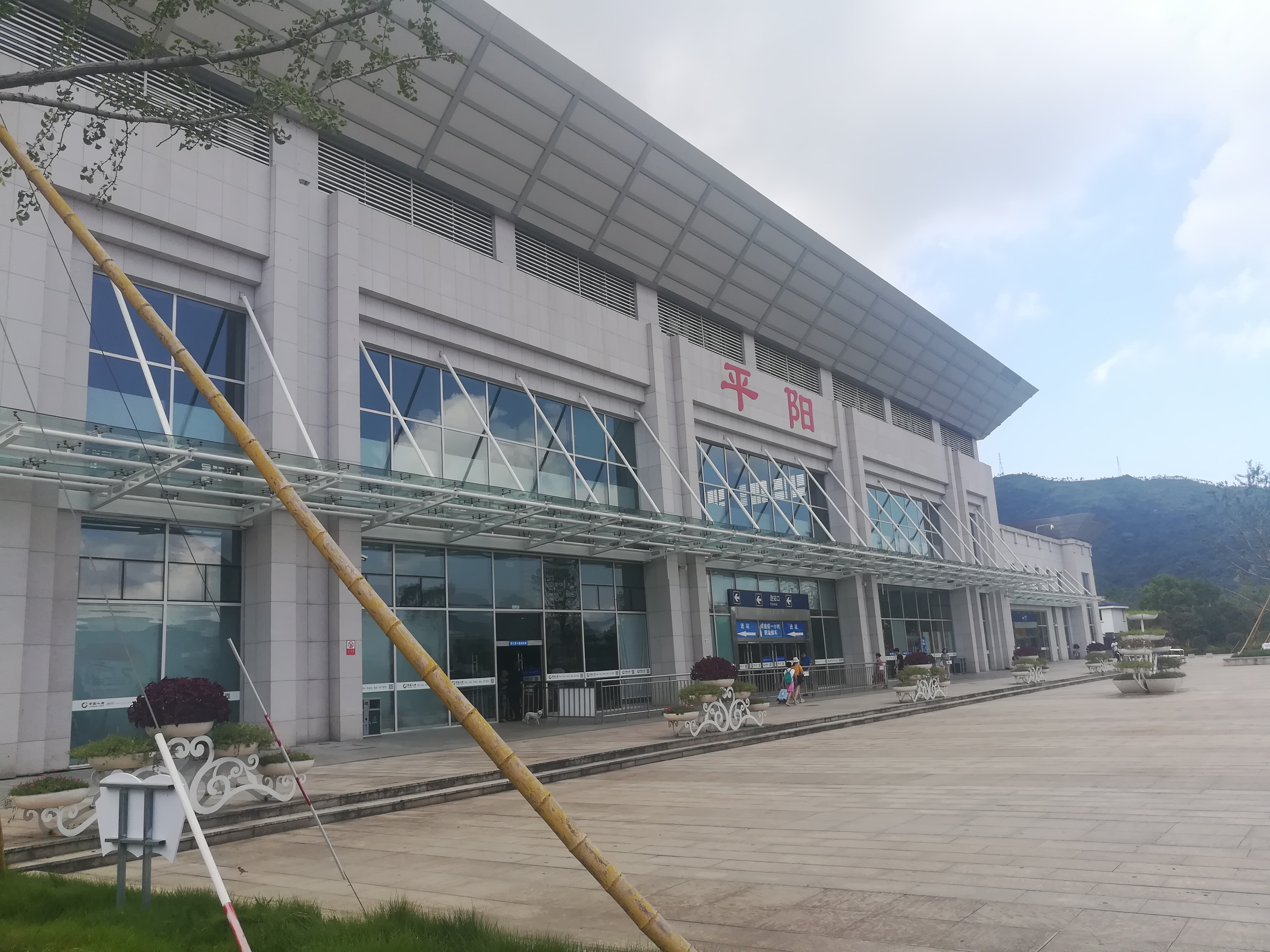

General information
- Location: Pingyang County, Wenzhou, Zhejiang; China
- Operated by: Shanghai Railway Bureau, China Railway Corporation
- Line: Wenzhou–Fuzhou railway

Other information
- Station code: TMIS code: 33996; Telegraph code: ARH; Pinyin code: PYA
- Classification: 2nd class station

History
- Previous names: Aojiang
Location

Pingyang railway station (Chinese: 平阳站), formerly known as Aojiang railway station (Chinese: 鳌江站), is a railway station located in Pingyang County, Wenzhou, Zhejiang Province, China, on the Wenzhou–Fuzhou railway which is operated by China Railway Shanghai Group.

The station name was renamed from Aojiang to Pingyang on July 15, 2019.

Preceding station	China Railway High-speed	Following station
Rui'an towards Wenzhou South	Wenzhou–Fuzhou railway	Cangnan towards Fuzhou South
