= Chengbei Subdistrict, Fu'an =

Chengbei Subdistrict 城北街道
- Subdistrict
- Location in Fujian Chengbei (China)
- Coordinates: 27°05′42″N 119°38′32″E
- Country: People's Republic of China
- Province: Fujian
- Prefecture-level city: Ningde
- County-level city: Fu'an
- Elevation: 38 m (125 ft)
- Time zone: UTC+8 (China Standard)
- Postal code: 355000
- Area code: 0593

Chengbei Subdistrict (Chinese: 城北街道; pinyin: Chéngběi Jiēdào; lit. 'city north') is a subdistrict of Fu'an in northeastern Fujian, People's Republic of China, occupying the northern portion of the urban area of Fu'an as suggested by its name. As of 2011, it has 8 residential communities (社区) under its administration.

== See also ==
- List of township-level divisions of Fujian
