= Ao River (Fujian) =

River in China

Coordinates: 26°15′46″N 119°38′18″E

The Ao (Chinese: 敖江), also known as the Dai, is the sixth longest river of Fujian province, China. It originates in the Jiufeng Mountains and flows into the East China Sea. The river has a total length of 137 km and basin area of 2665 square kilometers.
