= Wenzhou–Fuzhou railway =

Railway line in China

Hangzhou–Fuzhou–Shenzhen high-speed railway Wenzhou–Fuzhou Section
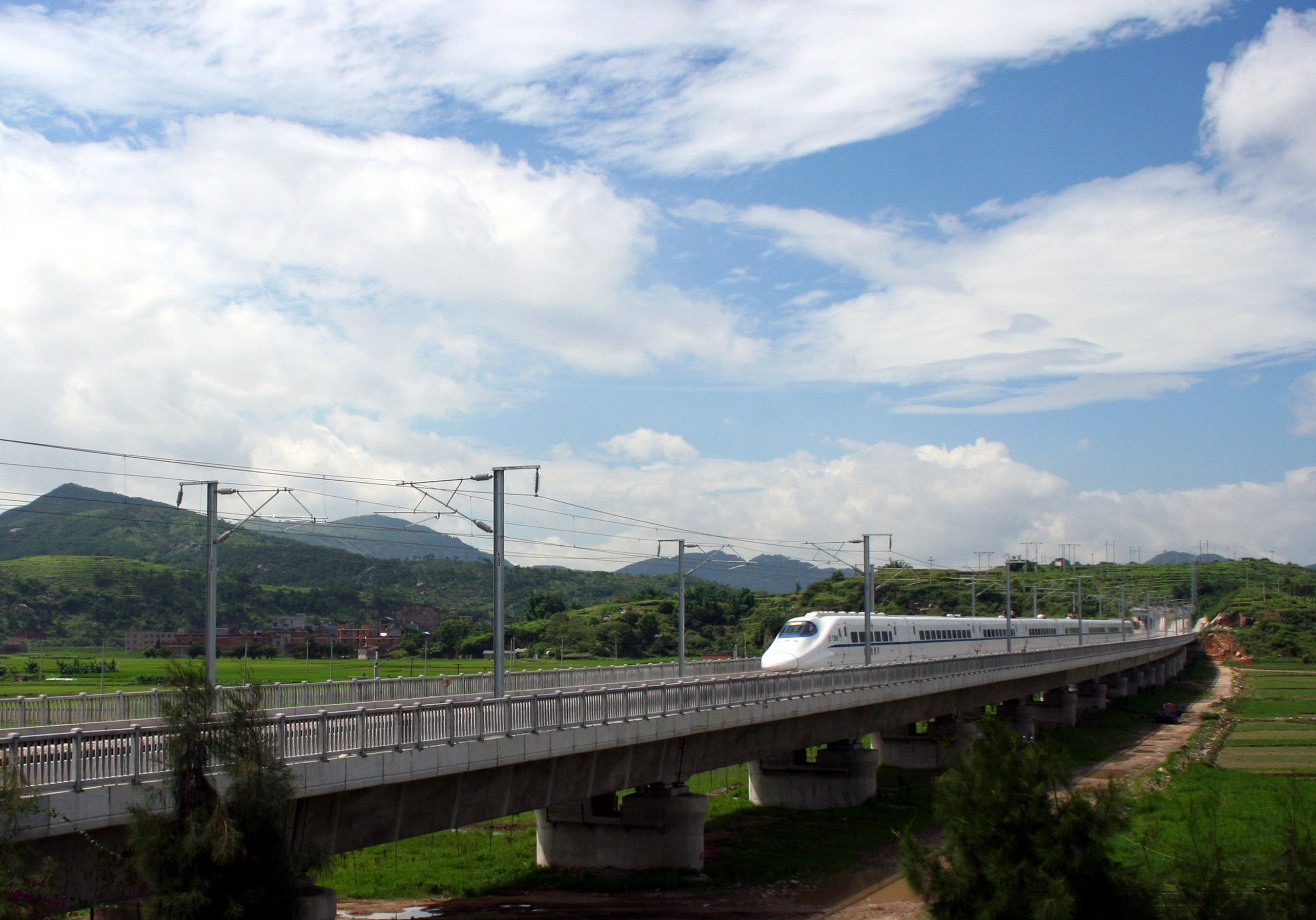
- The railway in Lianjiang County, Fujian

Overview
- Native name: 杭福深高速铁路温福段
- Status: Operational
- Owner: CR Shanghai; CR Nanchang
- Locale: Zhejiang province Fujian province

Service
- Type: High-speed rail Heavy rail
- System: China Railway High-speed
- Operators: CR Shanghai; CR Nanchang
- Depot: Fuzhou

History
- Opened: September 28, 2009

Technical
- Line length: 298.1 km (185 mi)
- Number of tracks: 2 (Double-track)
- Track gauge: 1,435 mm (4 ft 8 1/2 in) standard gauge
- Electrification: 25 kV 50 Hz AC (Overhead line)
- Operating speed: 250 km/h (155 mph)
- Maximum incline: 0.6%

Wenzhou–Fuzhou railway
- Simplified Chinese: 温福铁路
- Traditional Chinese: 溫福鐵路
Transcriptions
Standard Mandarin
- Hanyu Pinyin: Wēnfú Tiělù

Wenzhou–Fuzhou railway

Technical
- Line length: 298.1 km (185 mi)
- Track gauge: 1,435 mm (4 ft 8 1/2 in)
- Operating speed: 200 km/h (124 mph) max.

The Wenzhou–Fuzhou railway, also known as the Wenfu railway, (Chinese: 温福铁路) is a dual-track, electrified, high-speed rail line running between Wenzhou in Zhejiang and Fuzhou, the capital of Fujian. The line has a total length of 298.4 km (185.4 mi) and forms part of the Hangzhou–Fuzhou–Shenzhen passenger-dedicated railway. Construction began in August 2005, and the line opened to freight traffic on July 1, 2009. Passenger service began on September 28, 2009. Trains running on the line reach top speeds of 250 kilometres per hour, and the shortest trip between Wenzhou and Fuzhou takes 1.5 hours. The line required investment of ¥12.66 billion. To improve connections between Fuzhou and Zhejiang, the government is proposing to build a faster parallel passenger dedicated line called the Wenzhou–Fuzhou high-speed railway.

== Route ==
The Wenzhou–Fuzhou railway follows the rugged but prosperous coast of southern Zhejiang and northern Fujian with 69 km (43 mi) in the former and 229.1 km (142.4 mi) in the latter. Bridges and tunnels account for over 78% of the line's total length. Major cities along route include Rui'an, Cangnan, Fuding, Ningde, Luoyuan and Lianjiang.

== History ==
The Wenzhou–Fuzhou railway is the first railway to connect the two neighboring provinces. Most high-speed rail lines in China follow the routes of older conventional railroads, but there were no railways on the southeast coast prior to the building of high-speed rail. Historically, the southeast coastal region relied on maritime transportation, and rugged terrain made railway construction more expensive. In the first half of the 20th century, warfare and political instability delayed railway construction. During the Cold War, the southeast coast faced the threat of invasion from Republic of China on Taiwan and all railways were built inland. Only when political tensions across the Taiwan Strait eased in the late 1990s did planning of the Wenzhou–Fuzhou railway take place. In October 2002, the project was initially approved by the National Development and Reform Commission as a single-track railway at the 140 km/h (87 mph) standard. The project was then upgraded to a double-track 200 km/h (120 mph) standard and received State Council approval in 2004. Construction on an experimental basis began in December 2004 and on a full-scale in August 2005. Track-laying was completed in April 2009. Freight and passenger service began, respectively on July 1 and September 28, 2009.

== Rail connections ==
- Wenzhou:Ningbo–Taizhou–Wenzhou railway, Jinhua–Wenzhou railway
- Fuzhou: Fuzhou–Xiamen railway, Nanping–Fuzhou railway, Xiangtang–Putian railway
- Ningde: Quzhou–Ningde railway

== See also ==
- List of railways in China
