= Raoping railway station =

Railway station in Gaotang, Guangdong, China

Coordinates: 23.7147°N 116.9283°E

Raoping 饶平
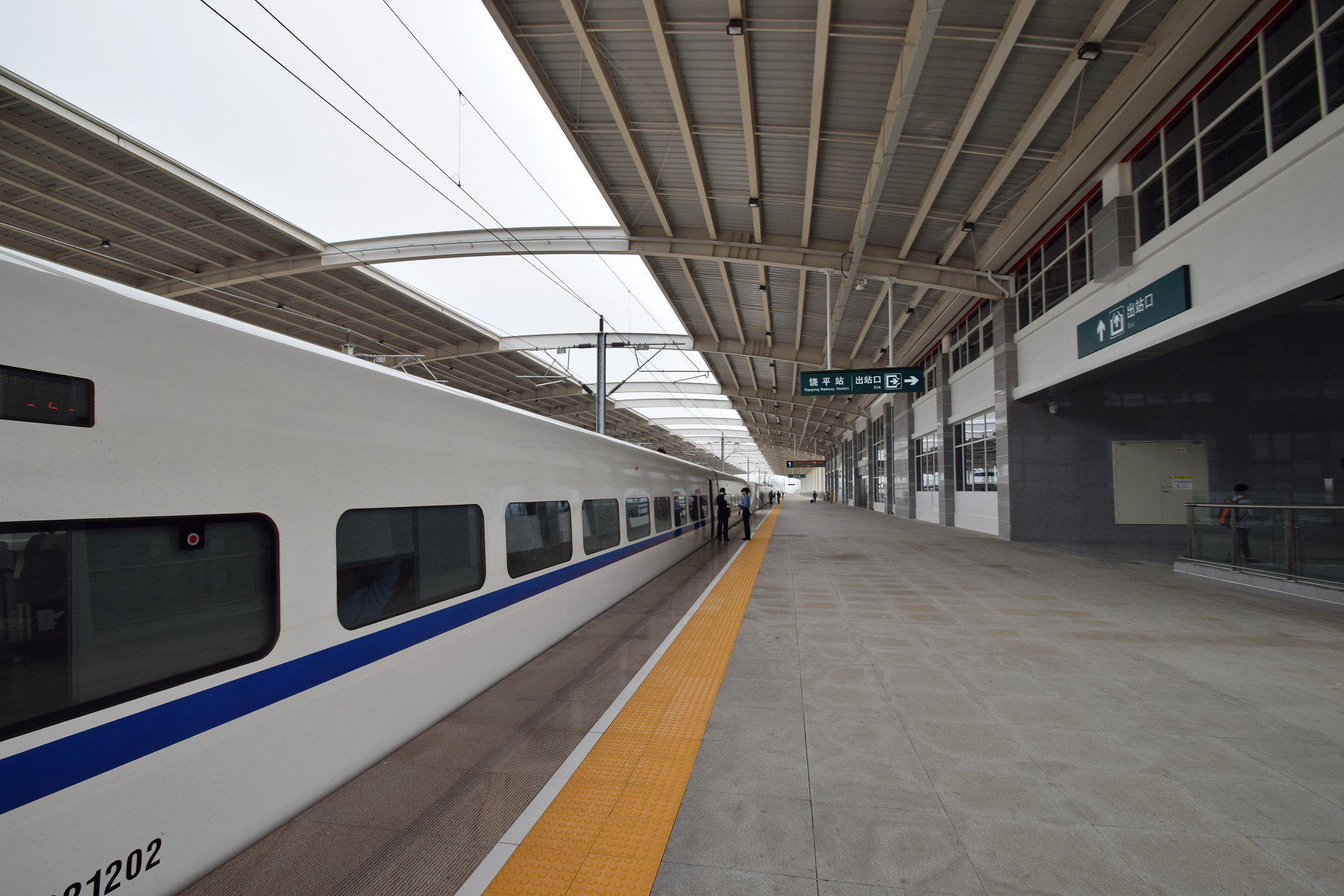

General information
- Location: Guangdong; China
- Operated by: Guangzhou Railway (Group) Corp., China Railway Corporation
- Line(s): Xiamen–Shenzhen railway

Raoping railway station (Chinese: 饶平站) is a railway station located in Gaotang Town, Raoping County, Guangdong Province, China, on the Xiamen–Shenzhen railway operated by the Guangzhou Railway (Group) Corp., China Railway Corporation.

| Preceding station | China Railway High-speed | Following station |
|---|---|---|
| Zhao'an towards Xiamen North | Xiamen–Shenzhen railway | Chaoshan towards Shenzhen North |
