= Shantou railway station =

Railway station in Shantou, China

Shantou 汕头
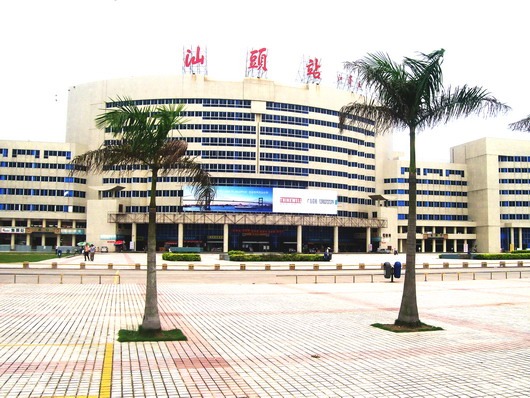

Chinese name
- Simplified Chinese: 汕头站
- Traditional Chinese: 汕頭站
Transcriptions
Standard Mandarin
- Hanyu Pinyin: Shàntóu Zhàn

General information
- Location: 1 Taishannan Road, Longhu District, Shantou, Guangdong; China
- Coordinates: 23°22′28.7″N 116°45′3.4″E
- Operated by: Guangzhou Railway Group
- Lines: Guangzhou–Meizhou–Shantou railway; Xiamen–Shenzhen railway; Shantou–Shanwei high-speed railway (under construction); East Guangdong intercity railway (planned)
- Platforms: 3
- Connections: Bus terminal

Construction
- Structure type: surface Bus underground

Other information
- Station code: China Railway: TMIS code: 24467; Telegraph code: OTQ; Pinyin code: STO
- Classification: First Class station

History
- Opened: 1995
Location

Shantou Railway Station (Chinese: 汕头站) is a railway station located in Longhu District, Shantou. It opened on 28 December 1995, situating on the eastern end of Guangzhou–Meizhou–Shantou railway, and later also branching off from Xiamen–Shenzhen railway (currently to Shenzhen North or beyond only).

== Basic Information ==
Shantou Railway Station locates in Longhu District, which serves citizens in the urban area of Shantou.

It currently manages 36 trains, in which 17 are departure there.

It was originally a station of Guangzhou–Meizhou–Shantou railway, and later connected to Xiamen–Shenzhen railway by a connecting railway line. This line was connected to Meizhou West via the Meizhou-Chaoshan railway in October 2019 providing additional journey options.

== Departure Trains ==
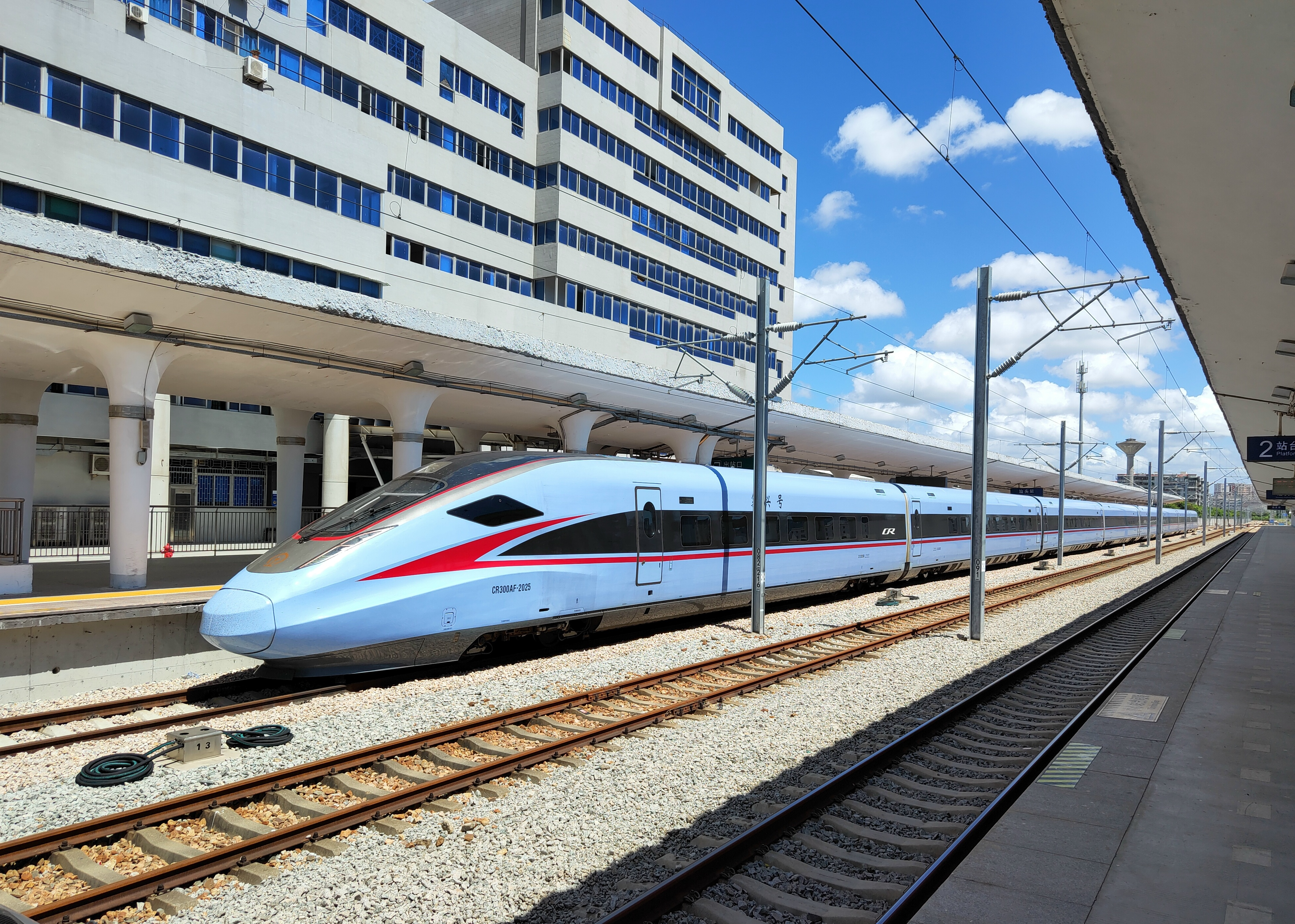
CR300AF-2025, D7142 departs from Shantou Railway Station heading to Guangzhoudong (Guangzhou East) Railway Station

Group	Train	Destination
Guangzhou Group	K688	Chongqing North railway station
Guangzhou Group	K800	Meizhou railway station Wuchang railway station
Guangzhou Group	D7320; D7322; D7324; D7326	Meizhou West railway station
Guangzhou Group	D7510; D7518; D7522; D7526; D7530; D7534; D7538	Guangzhou East railway station
Guangzhou Group	K9012	Changsha railway station
Guangzhou Group	K9098 (only in high season)	Shenzhen West railway station
Guangzhou Group	D7402; D7430; D7434; D7438; D7442; D7446	Shenzhen North railway station

Please note the above only presents initial train numbers. Train numbers are subject to changes at some intermediate stations.

== Connected Lines ==
- Guangzhou–Meizhou–Shantou railway
- Xiamen–Shenzhen railway

The station is currently a terminus. However, it will become a through-station with the opening of the Shantou–Shanwei high-speed railway.

=== The Shantou Connecting Line to Xiamen–Shenzhen Railway ===
The Shantou connecting line to Xiamen–Shenzhen railway, is a railway constructed to solve the inconvenience of reaching Chaoshan railway station or Chaoyang railway station, for citizens living in the main city.

This line was planned in August 2007, approved in December 2013, construction commenced on 10 May 2015, completed and tested on 8 December 2018 and formally opened on 5 January 2019.

== History ==
- 28 December 1995 - Established
- 1 July 2014 - Added a new line towards Chongqing North railway station
- 5 January 2019 - Added a new line connecting to the existing Xiamen–Shenzhen railway

== See also ==
- Shantou South railway station
