= Lufeng railway station =

Lufeng railway station may refer to:

- Lufeng railway station (Yunnan) (禄丰站), a railway station of Chengdu–Kunming railway in Lufeng County, Yunnan, China
- Lufeng railway station (Guangdong) (陆丰站), a railway station of Xiamen–Shenzhen railway in Guangdong, China
