= Jieyang Airport railway station =

Railway station in Jieyang, Guangdong, China

Jieyang Airport 揭阳机场
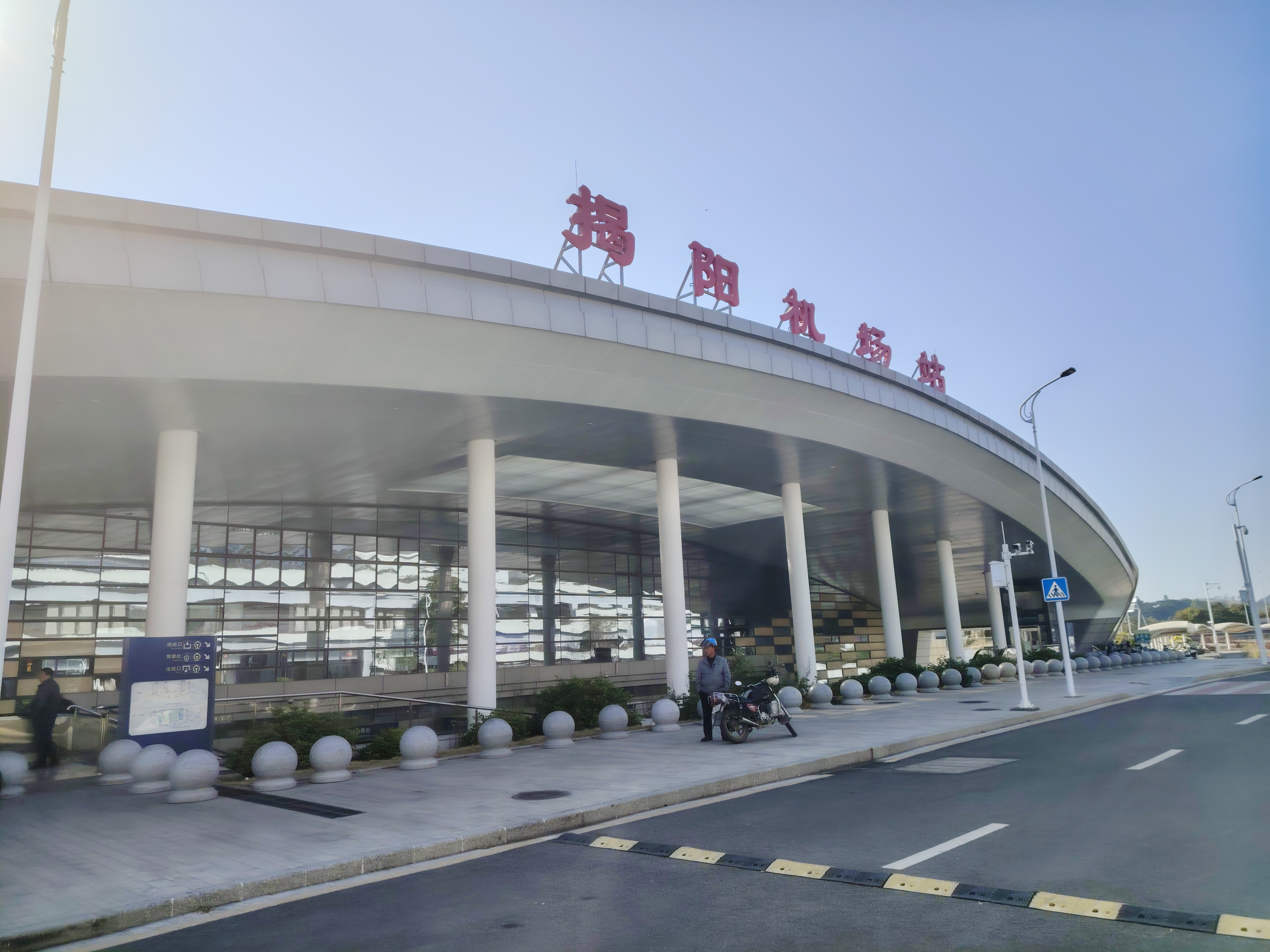

General information
- Other names: Chaoshan Airport (construction name)
- Location: Jiedong District, Jieyang, Guangdong; China
- Coordinates: 23.5477°N 116.5123°E
- Lines: Meizhou–Chaoshan railway East Guangdong intercity railway (under construction)
- Connections: Jieyang Chaoshan Airport

Other information
- Station code: JUA (China Railway Telegram Code); JYC (China Railway Pinyin Code)

History
- Opened: 11 October 2019 (Meizhou–Chaoshan railway)
Location

Jieyang Airport railway station (Chinese: 揭阳机场站; pinyin: Jiēyáng Jīchǎng zhàn), formerly known as Chaoshan Airport railway station (Chinese: 潮汕机场站; pinyin: Cháoshàn Jīchǎng zhàn) during construction, is a railway station in Jiedong District, Jieyang, Guangdong, China. It serves Jieyang Chaoshan International Airport.

== History ==
The station was opened on 11 October 2019 with the Meizhou–Chaoshan railway.

Preceding station	China Railway High-speed	Following station
Jieyang towards Meizhou West	Meizhou–Chaoshan railway	Chaoshan Terminus
