= Puning railway station =

Railway station in China

Coordinates: 23.2735°N 116.2089°E

Puning 普寧
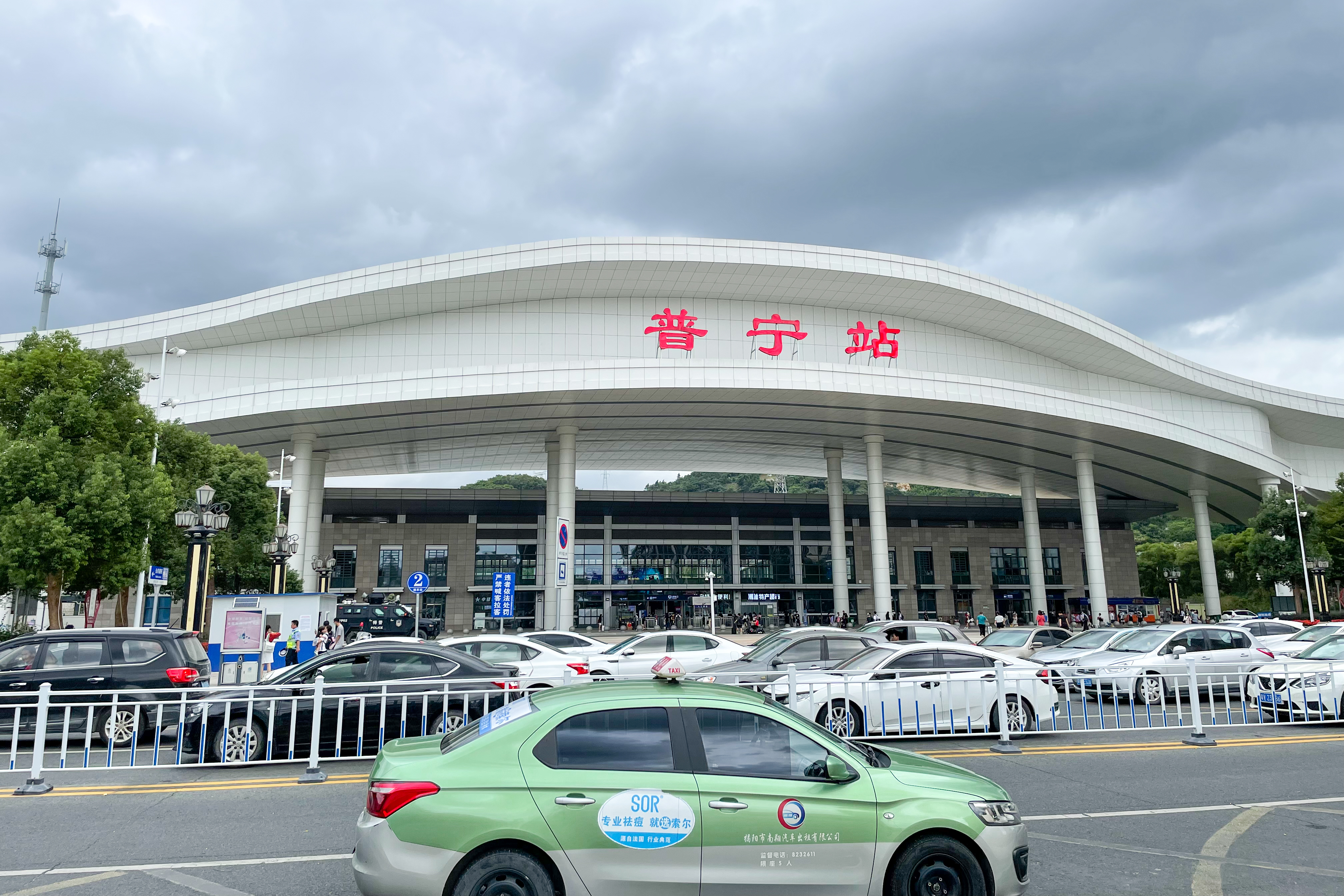

General information
- Location: Guangdong; China
- Operated by: Guangzhou Railway (Group) Corp., China Railway Corporation
- Line: Xiamen–Shenzhen railway

Puning station (simplified Chinese: 普宁站; traditional Chinese: 普寧站; pinyin: Pǔníng Zhàn) is a railway station located in Puning City, Jieyang, Guangdong Province, China, on the Xiamen–Shenzhen Railway operated by Guangzhou Railway (Group) Corp., China Railway Corporation.

Preceding station	China Railway High-speed	Following station
Chaoyang towards Xiamen North	Xiamen–Shenzhen railway	Kuitan towards Shenzhen North
