= Typhoon Chebi (2001) =

Pacific typhoon in 2001

Typhoon Chebi (Emong)
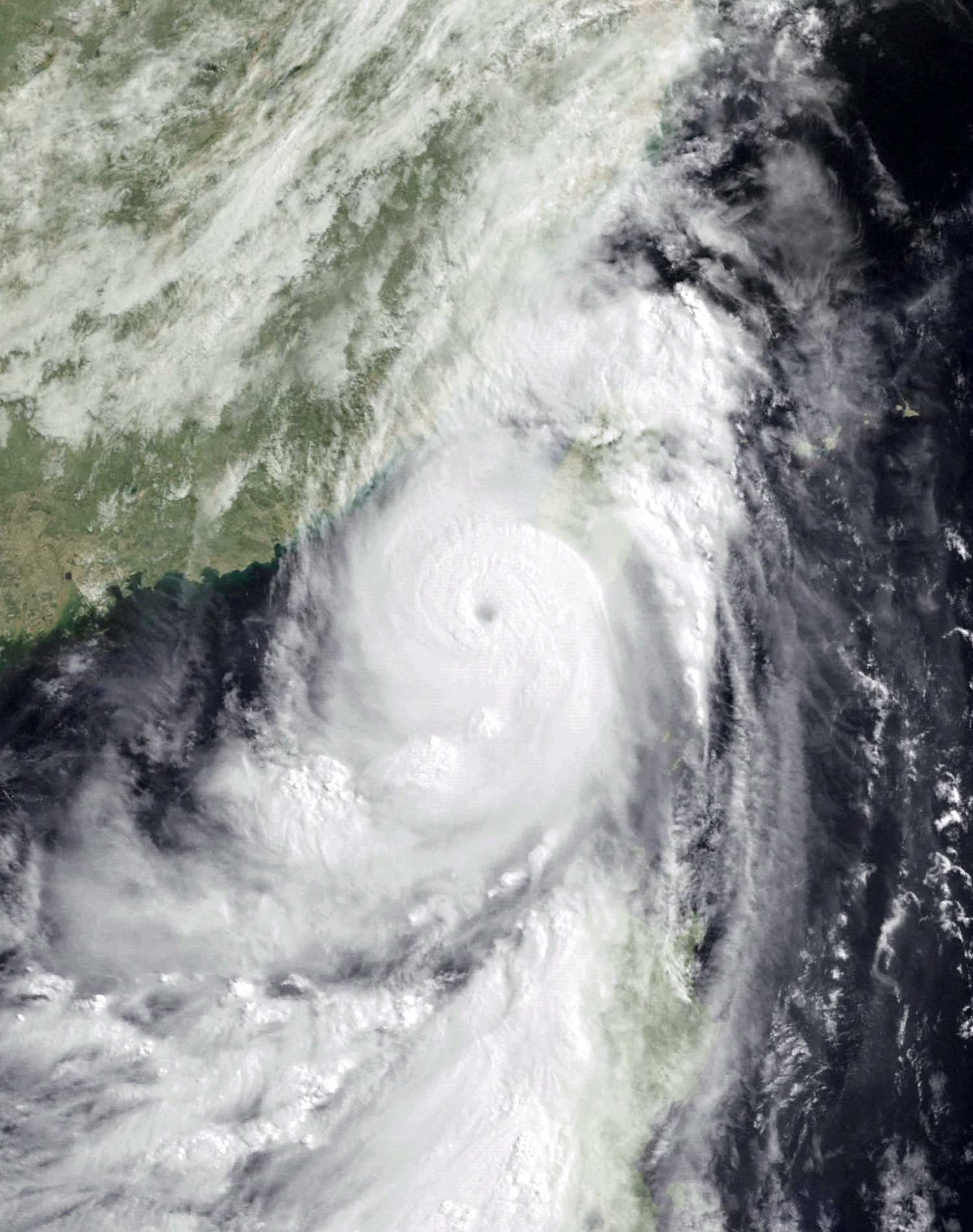
- Chebi approaching China at peak intensity on June 23

Meteorological history
- Formed: June 19, 2001
- Remnant low: June 24, 2001
- Dissipated: June 25, 2001

Typhoon
- 10-minute sustained (JMA)
- Highest winds: 120 km/h (75 mph)
- Lowest pressure: 965 hPa (mbar); 28.50 inHg

Category 3-equivalent typhoon
- 1-minute sustained (SSHWS/JTWC)
- Highest winds: 185 km/h (115 mph)
- Lowest pressure: 944 hPa (mbar); 27.88 inHg

Overall effects
- Fatalities: 464 total
- Missing: 12
- Damage: $471 million (2001 USD)
- Areas affected: Philippines, China, Taiwan, South Korea, Japan
- Part of the 2001 Pacific typhoon season

Typhoon Chebi (Note: The name Chebi (Korean: 제비, [ˈt͡ɕe̞(ː)bi]) was contributed by South Korea and refers to the barn swallow (Hirundo rustica) in Korean.) known in the Philippines as Typhoon Emong, was a powerful and deadly tropical cyclone that caused severe damage and destruction in five countries, the Philippines, Taiwan, China, South Korea, and Japan in late-June 2001. The fourth depression, second named storm, and first typhoon of the 2001 Pacific typhoon season, Chebi formed from an area of convection that developed into a tropical depression southeast of Palau. The depression quickly strengthened into Tropical Storm Chebi six hours later. Chebi continued to move westward, passing over cooler waters, which caused Chebi to weaken, but it still maintained tropical storm status as it entered the Luzon Strait on June 23. In the Luzon Strait, Chebi encountered favorable conditions and began to re-intensify. By June 23, Chebi had reached Category 1- equivalent typhoon status. The storm continued to strengthen overnight, and by June 24, Chebi had reached its peak intensity. A trough of low pressure to the north of Chebi caused the storm to turn westward and then northwestward. That same day, Chebi made landfall near Fuzhou City. The storm then weakened rapidly as it moved inland, and by June 25, Chebi's remnants were over China. The remnants of Chebi continued to move northward, and on June 30, they completely dissipated.

== Meteorological history ==
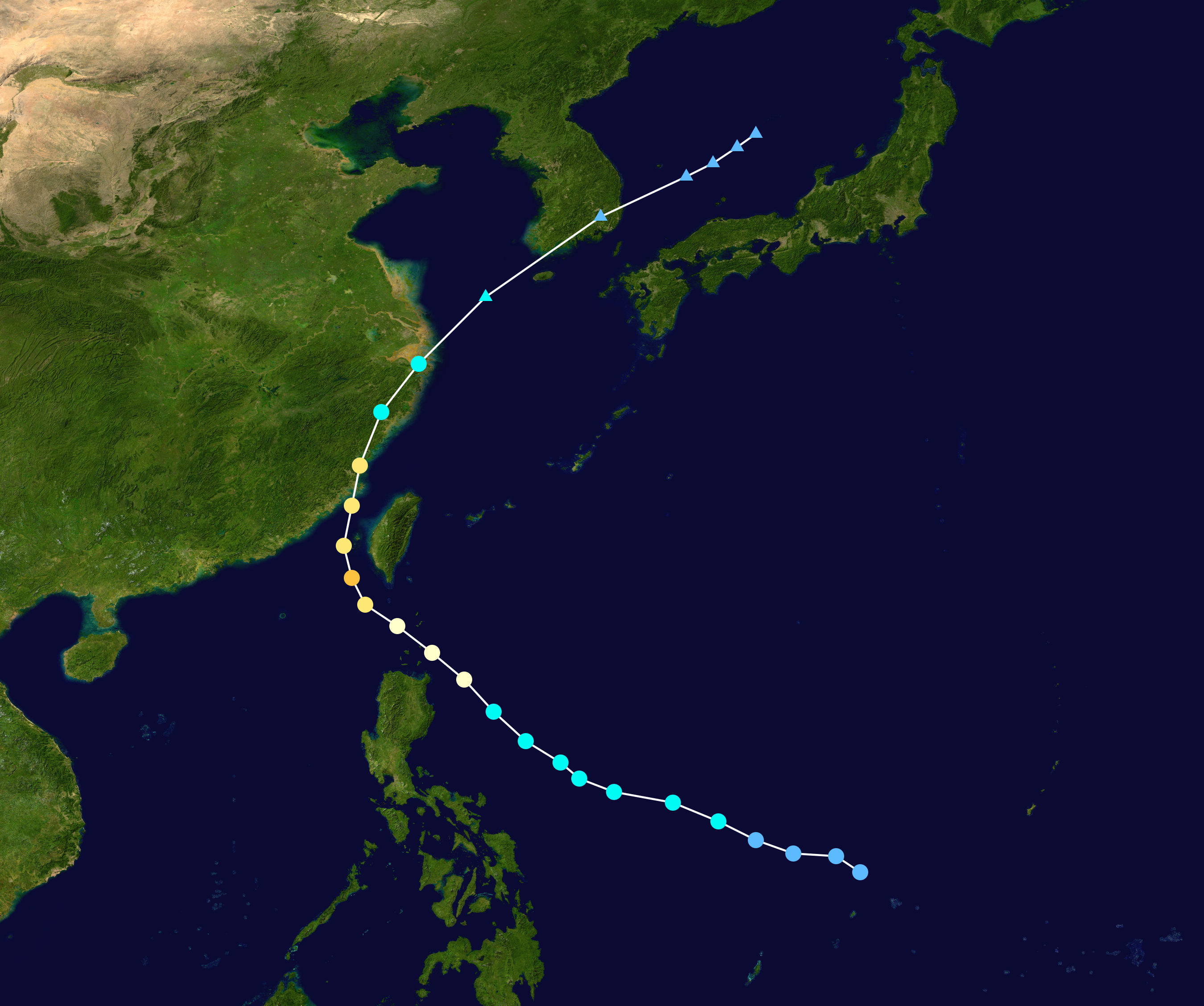
Map plotting the storm's track and intensity, according to the Saffir–Simpson scale Map key Saffir–Simpson scale Tropical depression (≤38 mph, ≤62 km/h) Tropical storm (39–73 mph, 63–118 km/h) Category 1 (74–95 mph, 119–153 km/h) Category 2 (96–110 mph, 154–177 km/h) Category 3 (111–129 mph, 178–208 km/h) Category 4 (130–156 mph, 209–251 km/h) Category 5 (≥157 mph, ≥252 km/h) Unknown Storm type Tropical cyclone Subtropical cyclone Extratropical cyclone, remnant low, tropical disturbance, or monsoon depression

Chebi originated from a tropical disturbance which formed on June 19 near Palau, a small island nation in the western Pacific Ocean. The depression, designated by the Joint Typhoon Warning Center (JTWC) as Tropical Depression 04W, quickly strengthened into Tropical Storm Chebi six hours later, with maximum sustained winds of 40 mph (65 km/h). Chebi continued to move westward, passing north of the Philippines on June 21. As it moved over cooler waters, Chebi began to weaken, but it still maintained tropical storm status as it entered the Luzon Strait on June 23. In the Luzon Strait, Chebi encountered favorable conditions and began to re-intensify. By the evening of June 23, Chebi had reached Category 1 typhoon status, with maximum sustained winds of 75 mph (120 kilometers per hour). The storm continued to strengthen overnight, and by the morning of June 24, Chebi had reached its peak intensity of 100 mph (160 km/h). The center of the storm was located 75 miles (121 kilometers) south of Taiwan at this time. A trough of low pressure to the north of Chebi caused the storm to turn westward and then northwestward. On June 24, Chebi made landfall near Fuzhou City, China, with maximum sustained winds of 70 miles per hour (113 kilometers per hour). The storm then weakened rapidly as it moved inland, and by June 25, Chebi had dissipated over China. The remnants of Chebi continued to move northward, and on June 30, they dissipated in the Eastern Pacific Ocean.

== Impact ==
=== Philippines ===
Chebi's heavy rains and strong winds left twenty-one dead, twelve missing and $14 million (2001 USD) in damage in the Philippines. Four of the nine were from a Belizean freighter that sank during the storm. Trees were downed in Tuguegarao, and rainfall caused waters to reach ankle-deep in Manila. Heavy winds and rainfall were reported in the Babuyan Islands chain and throughout Batanes. An anemometer recorded sustained wind gusts of 174 km/h (108 mph) in Itbayat. At least two of the aforementioned deaths occurred in Batanes province. At least four were killed in Manila, all from drowning. Storm weather reached as far south as Masbate and Samar. The Marikina River swelled, flooding Marikina under one foot of water.

=== Taiwan ===
Chebi caused heavy flooding and strong winds throughout much of western and southern Taiwan, killing 35 and injuring over 5,000, while leaving at least 14 missing. The Penghu Islands, which took the brunt of the typhoon, suffered considerable damage as 102 fishing boats sank and ten thousand people were left without power. The storm also crippled ground and air traffic. Rainfall reached accumulations as high as 1,190 millimeters within a three-day period in Mudan Township, with over 600 millimeters falling within just 24 hours. These rainfalls caused heavy flash flooding and landslides throughout many mountainous cities and townships. Tree branches and leaves littered streets in Taipei.

The most severe single deadly event from Typhoon Chebi was the Dawu mudslides. Heavy rains from Chebi resulted in steep, slippery mountainsides. This unconsolidated soil broke loose and began heading for the valleys of Dawu. During its path, the mudslide destroyed at least 4 mountainside homes, killing 14. The mudslide later smashed into a business district, with many people sheltering there to escape the floods. The impact of the mudslide caused the destruction of a three-story office building, sheltering 11 at the time of impact. All but one of the refugees were killed following the destruction of the building. Total damages were estimated at $250 million (2001 USD).

=== Hong Kong and Macau ===
Stormy weather was reported on both Hong Kong and Macau. A woman was killed when a tree fell on her in Macau. Rainfall reached 200 millimeters in Kowloon. Over sixteen rescues were performed after a boat got capsized offshore Macau, 10 were missing, and were declared dead after a month of the sinking.

=== China ===
A rain-laden typhoon, Chebi produced over 800 millimeters of rain across Guangdong, where 61 were killed. About 113 people were killed in the southeastern province of Fujian. The storm also destroyed several thousand acres of crops, resulting in economic losses. In Ningde, about 321,400 houses were destroyed by the typhoon. About 22 people were killed in Hangzhou when a landslide burst through a construction wall. Floods reached historical levels around the Hanjiang and the Huanggang River, reaching nearly 10 feet above the ground, causing over 50 deaths.

In Xiamen, the landfall site, glass shards and fallen trees clogged drains and disrupted travel. The storm surge reached 6 feet above sea level in Quanzhou. Over 24 were reported dead in Fuzhou alone, where entire streets were flooded and homes were swept away. The maximum rainfall in the entirety of Chebi's existence in China was recorded in Jinhua, where a total of 1,109 millimeters of rain fell, causing floods and landslides that claimed the lives of 30 in the prefecture. A death toll of 126 was confirmed within the province of Zhejiang.

Jiangxi and Anhui were also not spared, with rainfall totals reaching nearly 500 millimeters in the cities of Shangrao and Huangshan. Over 30 were killed in Jiangxi from floods, while Anhui had a more fixed toll of 37. The outer circulation of Chebi resulted in rainfall totals exceeding 300 millimeters in the Shanghai Metropolitan Area, resulting in unexpected flash floods which claimed the lives of 11 people.

=== South Korea ===
Storms and rainfall related to the remnants of Typhoon Chebi caused heavy disruptions and resulted in the deaths of 19 following a thunder-related fire in an apartment building in Busan.

=== Japan ===
Minor floods occurred in Akita Prefecture.
