= Yunxiao railway station =

Railway station in Zhangzhou, China

Coordinates: 23.8941°N 117.3569°E

Yunxiao 雲霄站
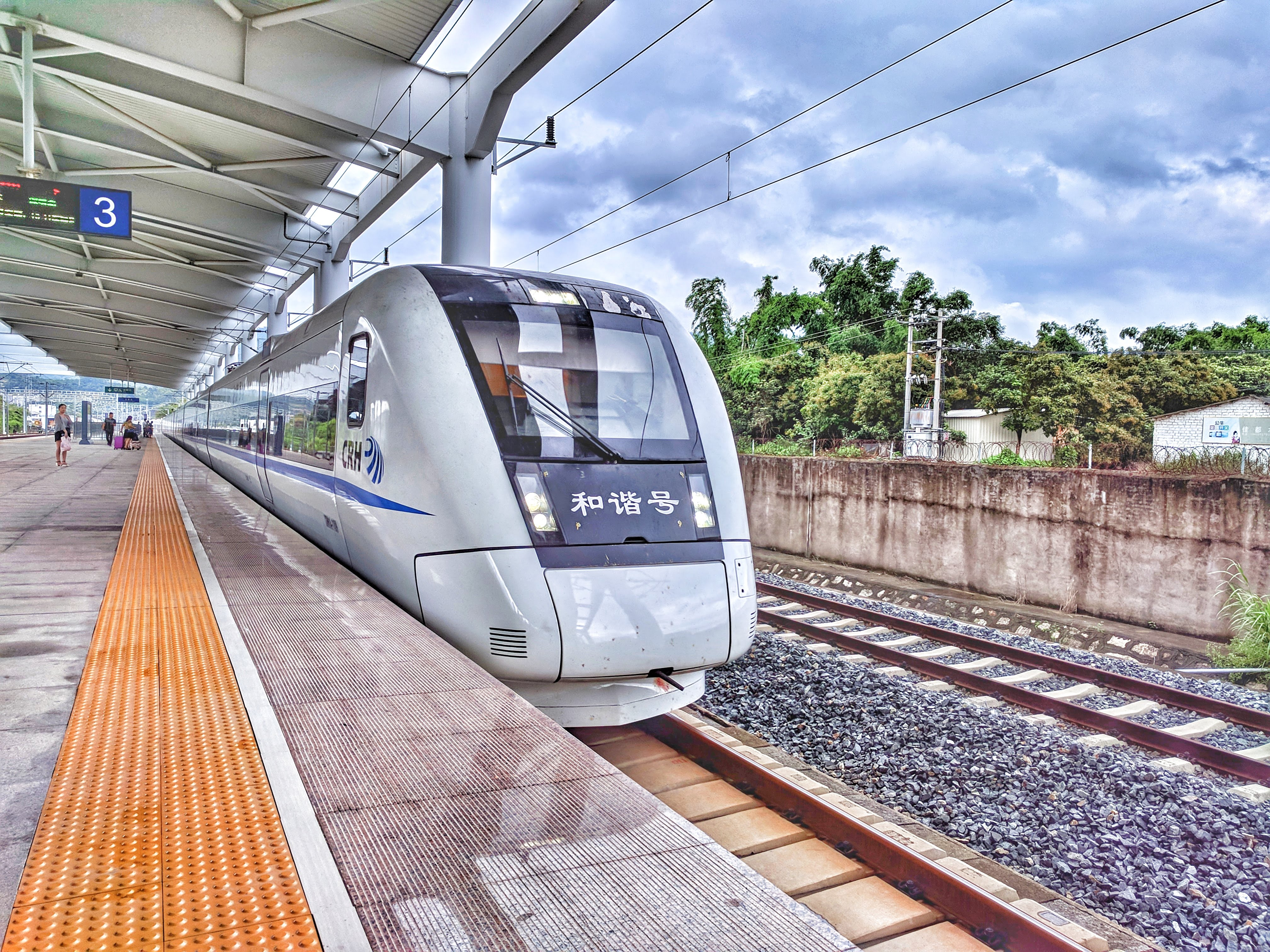

General information
- Location: Yunxiao County, Zhangzhou, Fujian; China
- Operated by: Nanchang Railway Bureau, China Railway Corporation
- Line(s): Xiamen–Shenzhen railway

Yunxiao railway station (Chinese: 雲霄站) is a railway station located in Yunxiao County, Zhangzhou, Fujian Province, China, on the Xiamen–Shenzhen railway operated by the Nahchang Railway Bureau, China Railway Corporation.

Preceding station	China Railway High-speed	Following station
Zhangpu towards Xiamen North	Xiamen–Shenzhen railway	Zhao'an towards Shenzhen North
