= Gaotang, Guangdong =

Gaotang 高堂镇
- Town
- Location in Guangdong
- Coordinates: 23°42′24″N 116°56′26″E
- Country: People's Republic of China
- Province: Guangdong
- Prefecture-level city: Chaozhou
- County: Raoping

Area
  - Total: 26.5 km^{2} (10.2 sq mi)
- Elevation: 10 m (33 ft)
- Time zone: UTC+8 (China Standard)
- Area code: 0768

Gaotang (Chinese: 高堂; pinyin: Gāotáng) is a town of Raoping County in far eastern Guangdong province, China, located about 7 kilometres (4.3 mi) northwest of the county seat along the western (right) bank of the Huanggang River (黄冈河), which empties into the South China Sea near the county seat. As of 2011, it has 12 villages under its administration.

== See also ==
- List of township-level divisions of Guangdong
