= Kuitan railway station =

Railway station in Guangdong, China

Coordinates: 23.0647°N 115.9814°E

Kuitan 葵潭
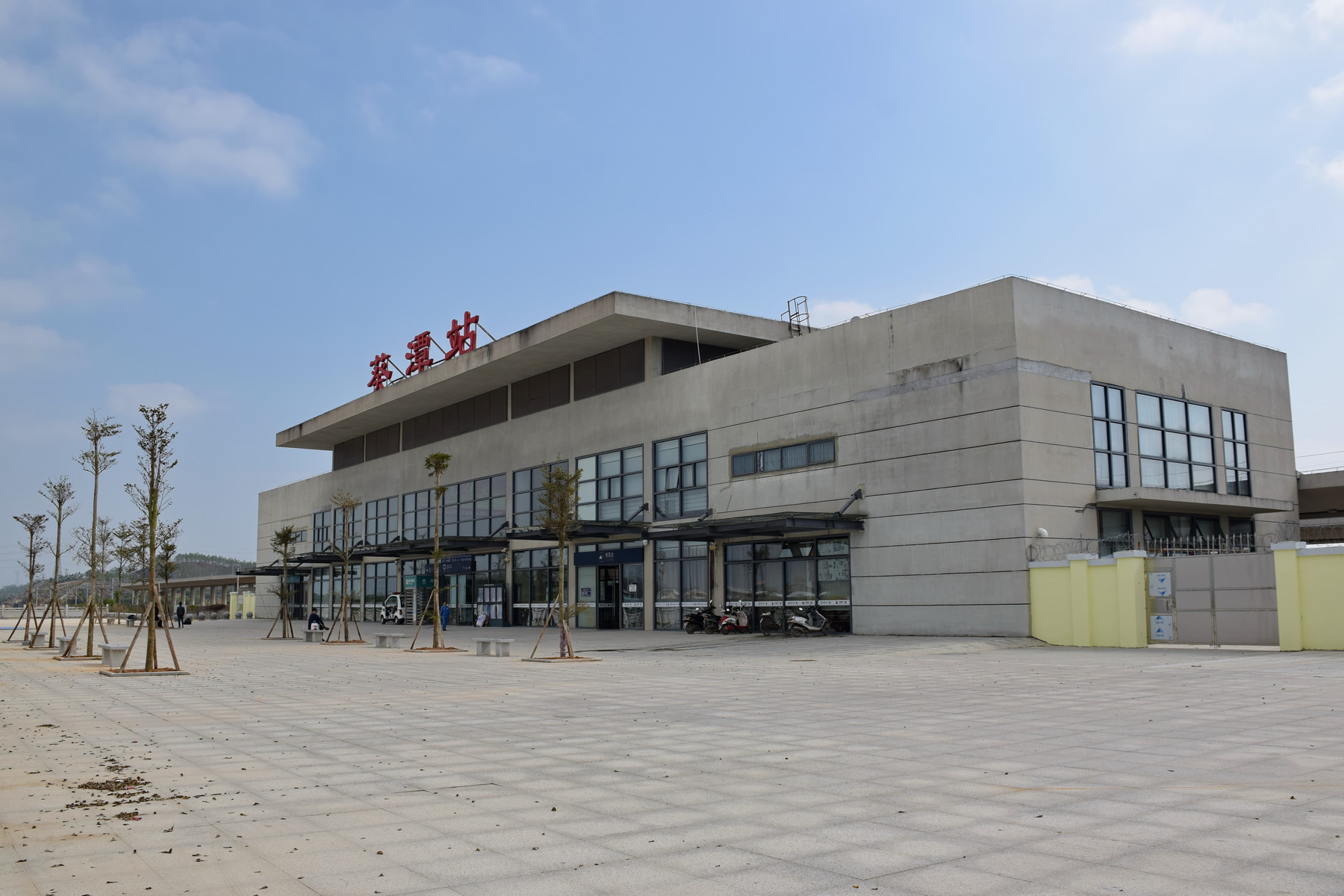

General information
- Location: Guangdong; China
- Operated by: Guangzhou Railway (Group) Corp., China Railway Corporation
- Line: Xiamen–Shenzhen railway

History
- Opened: 26 December 2013

Kuitan railway station (Chinese: 葵潭站; pinyin: Kuítán Zhàn) is a railway station in Kuitan Town, Huilai County, Guangdong Province, China, on the Xiamen–Shenzhen railway. The station is operated by the Guangzhou Railway (Group) Corp., China Railway Corporation.

The station officially opened on 26 December 2013.

Preceding station	China Railway High-speed	Following station
Puning towards Xiamen North	Xiamen–Shenzhen railway	Lufeng towards Shenzhen North
