= Zhao'an railway station =

Rail station in Fujian, China

Zhao'an 诏安
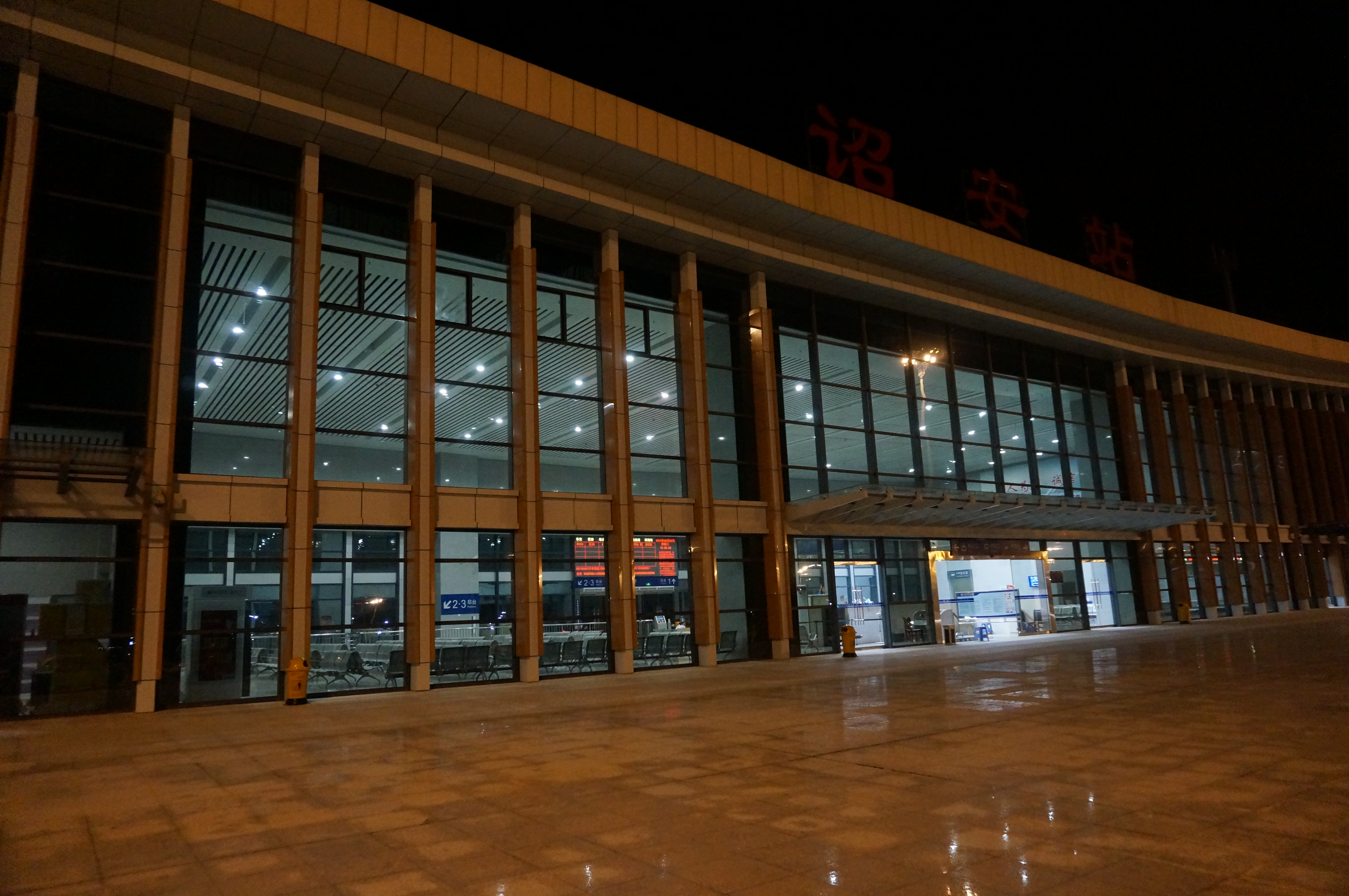

General information
- Location: Zhao'an County, Zhangzhou, Fujian; China
- Coordinates: 23.774758°N 117.092536°E
- Operated by: Nanchang Railway Bureau, China Railway Corporation
- Line: Xiamen–Shenzhen railway
Location

Zhao'an railway station is a railway station located in Zhao'an County, Zhangzhou, Fujian Province, People's Republic of China, on the Xiamen–Shenzhen railway which is operated by Nanchang Railway Bureau, China Railway Corporation. It was opened in 2013.

Preceding station	China Railway High-speed	Following station
Yunxiao towards Xiamen North	Xiamen–Shenzhen railway	Raoping towards Shenzhen North
