= Shantou–Shanwei high-speed railway =

High-speed rail line in China

Shantou–Shanwei high-speed railway 汕汕高速铁路
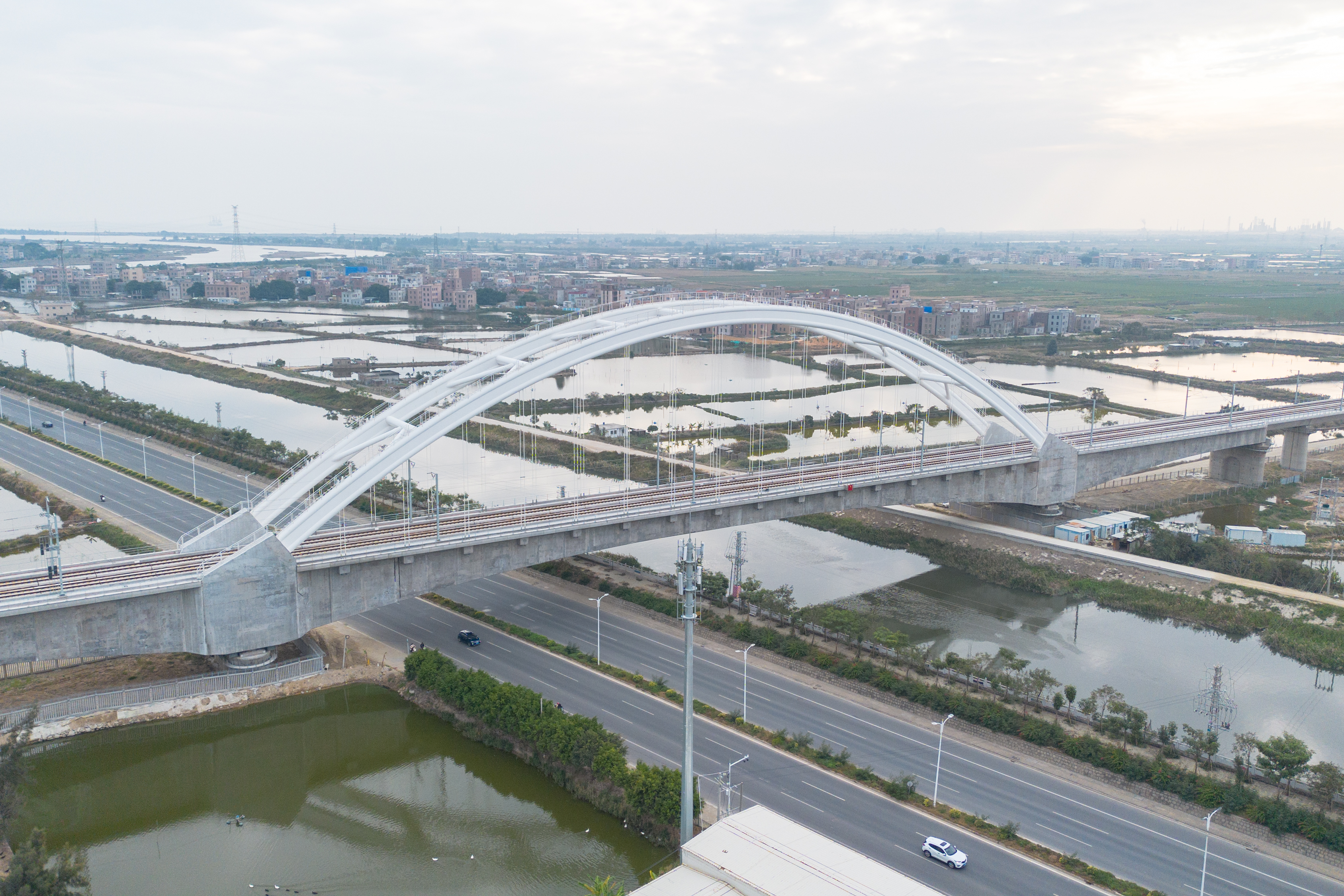
- Leiling River Railway Bridge at Shantou–Shanwei high-speed railway

Overview
- Status: Operational
- Termini: Shantou; Shanwei
- Stations: 7

Service
- Operator(s): China Railway Guangzhou Group

Technical
- Line length: 161 km (100 mi)
- Track gauge: 1,435 mm (4 ft 8 1/2 in)
- Operating speed: 350 km/h (217 mph)

The Shantou–Shanwei high-speed railway is a high-speed railway currently under construction in China. The railway runs from Shantou railway station to Shanwei railway station. It serves as a faster parallel corridor to the existing mixed passenger freight Xiamen–Shenzhen railway. The line has a total length of 162 kilometers with 7 stations. It has a design speed of 350 kilometres per hour (220 mph) and the section between Shanwei and Shantou South railway station was completed on 26 December 2023. On 22 December 2025, the remaining section between Shantou South railway station and Shantou Railway Station was opened.

== History ==
A feasibility study on the line was approved in September 2018. On October 17, the Environmental Protection Department of Guangdong Province approved the "Report on Environmental Impact of the Shantou-Shanwei Railway". On December 26, 2018 the groundbreaking ceremony of the railway line was held in Jieyang. Construction on the undersea tunnel crossing the Shantou Bay (汕头湾) started in March 2020.

== Stations ==
Station Name	Chinese	China Railway transfers/connections
Shantou
Shantou South
Chaonan
Huilai
Lufeng East
Lufeng South
Shanwei
