= Longhu, Shantou =

Longhu 龙湖区 Dragon Lake District
- District
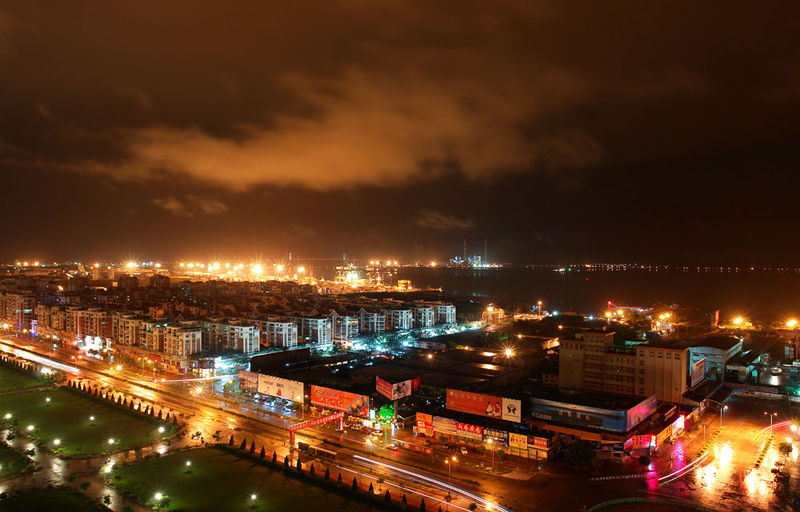
- Shantou Port

- Location of Longhu in Shantou

- Location in Guangdong
- Coordinates: 23°21′38″N 116°43′01″E
- Country: People's Republic of China
- Province: Guangdong
- Prefecture-level city: Shantou

Area
  - Total: 103.58 km^{2} (39.99 sq mi)

Population (2020 census)
  - Total: 630,749
  - Density: 6,089.5/km^{2} (15,772/sq mi)
- Time zone: UTC+8 (China Standard)

Longhu District (simplified Chinese: 龙湖区; traditional Chinese: 龍湖區; pinyin: Lónghú Qū; lit. 'dragon lake') is a district of Shantou, Guangdong province, China. It is the birthplace of the famous Shantou Special Economic Zone.

== Administrative divisions ==
There are 10 subdistricts in the district:

Administrative divisions of Longhu
| English name | Chinese | Pinyin | Area in km^{2} | Population 2010 | Permanent Residents | Divisions | |
| English name | Chinese | Pinyin | Area in km^{2} | Population 2010 | Permanent Residents | Residential communities | Administrative villages |
|---|---|---|---|---|---|---|---|
| Longhu District | 龙湖区 | Lónghú Qū | 119.42 | 536,356 | | 80 | 32 |
| Jinxia Subdistrict | 金霞街道 | Jīnxiá Jiēdào | 6.87 | 69,826 | 40,000 | 12 | 0 |
| Zhuchi Subdistrict | 珠池街道 | Zhū Chí Jiēdào | 13.6 | 136,289 | 70,000 | 12 | 4 |
| Xinjin Subdistrict | 新津街道 | Xīnjīn Jiēdào | 7.22 | 90,471 | 80,000 | 60 | 0 |
| Outing Subdistrict | 鸥汀街道 | Ōutīng Jiēdào | 15.04 | 45,884 | 43,676 | 0 | 18 |
| Longhua Subdistrict | 龙华街道 | Lónghuá Jiēdào | | | | 0 | 8 |
| Waisha Subdistrict | 外砂街道 | Wàishā Jiēdào | | 86,659 | | 0 | 17 |
| Longxiang Subdistrict | 龙祥街道 | Lóngxiáng Jiēdào | 9.66 | 41,795 | 42,000 | 2 | 6 |
| Xinxi Subdistrict | 新溪街道 | Xīnxī Jiēdào | | 65,432 | | 1 | 15 |
| Xinhai Subdistrict | 新海街道 | Xīnhǎi Jiēdào | | | | 0 | 8 |
| Longteng Subdistrict | 龙腾街道 | Lóngténg Jiēdào | | | | 2 | 0 |

== Shantou Special Economic Zone ==
In the northwestern part of the Zhuchi Street Subdistrict lies the Longhu Processing Area of the Shantou Special Economic Zone.

== Industry ==
Towards the south is the Zhuchi Deep-water Port Area of the Shantou Port. This area contains an international terminal. Connecting the port to the rest of the mainland are two railways: the Shugang railway and the Guangmeishan Railway, which has a Passenger Station.

== Transportation ==
- Shantou railway station is located here.
- Shantou South railway station is located here.
