= Shantou South railway station =

Railway station in Shantou, Guangdong

Shantounan 汕头南
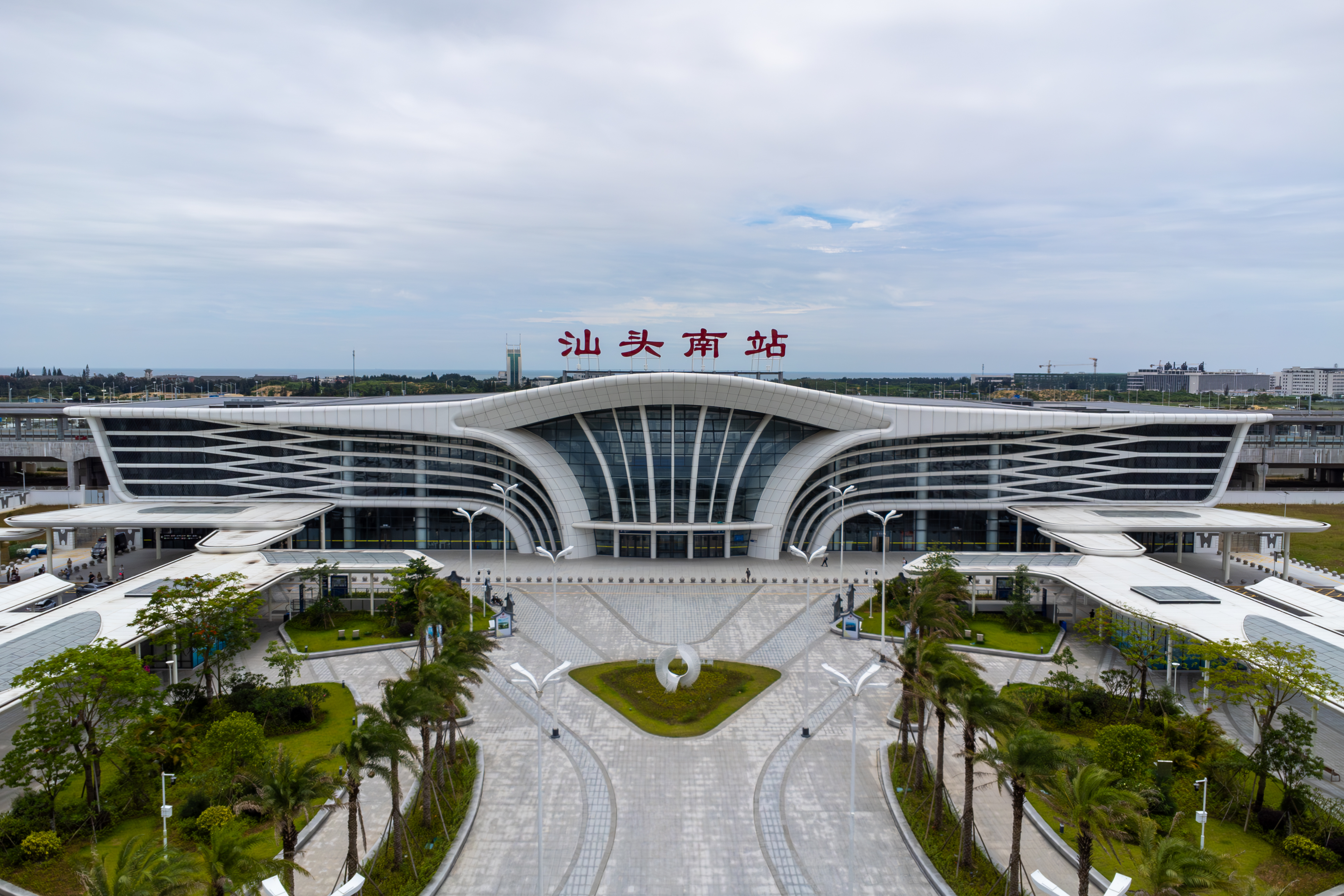

General information
- Location: Longhu District, Shantou, Guangdong; China
- Coordinates: 23.23174°N 116.67299°E
- Line: Shantou–Shanwei high-speed railway
- Platforms: 2

Construction
- Structure type: At-grade
- Accessible: Yes

History
- Opened: 26 December 2023
Location

Shantou South railway station (Chinese: 汕头南站) is a railway station in Longhu District, Shantou, Guangdong, China. It is an intermediate stop on the Shantou–Shanwei high-speed railway.

== Layout ==
The station is expected to have two side platforms and a bypass line in either direction.

== See also ==
- Shantou railway station
