= Chaoyang railway station (Guangdong) =

Railway station in Shantou, Guangdong, China

Chaoyang 潮阳
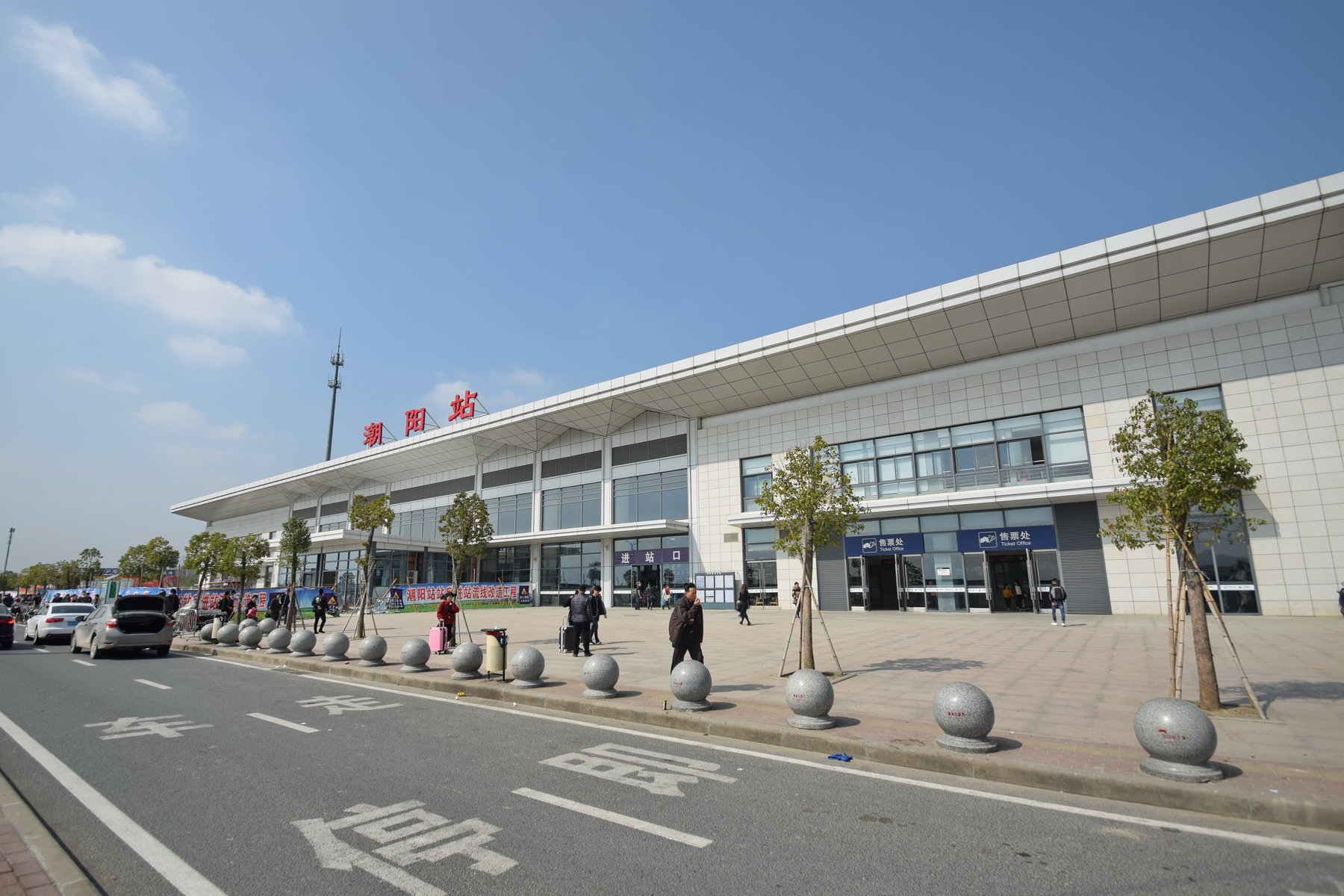

General information
- Location: Chaoyang District, Shantou, Guangdong; China
- Coordinates: 23.38396°N 116.41802°E
- Operated by: Guangzhou Railway (Group) Corp., China Railway Corporation
- Line: Xiamen–Shenzhen railway
Location

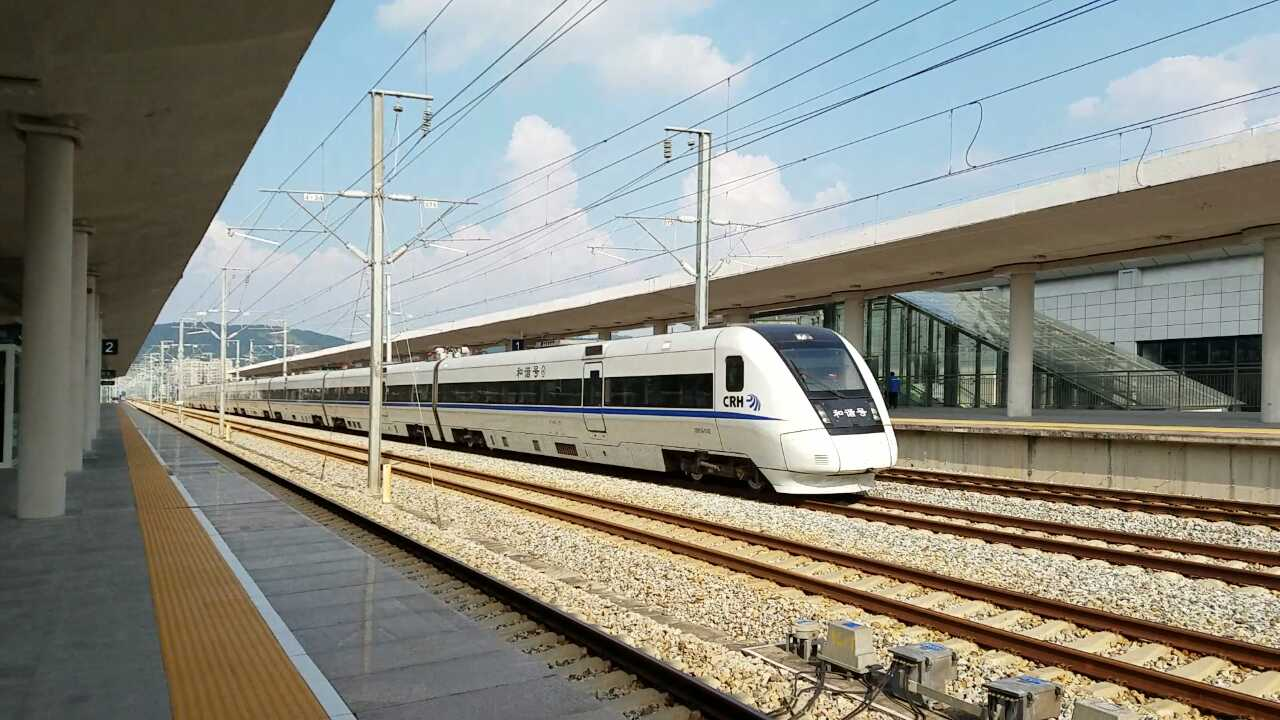
D687 passing Chaoyang railway station

Chaoyang railway station (Chinese: 潮阳站) is a railway station located in the Chaoyang District of Shantou City, Guangdong Province, China, on the Xiamen–Shenzhen railway operated by the Guangzhou Railway Group, China Railway Corporation.

Preceding station	China Railway High-speed	Following station
Chaoshan towards Xiamen North	Xiamen–Shenzhen railway	Puning towards Shenzhen North
