= Lufeng railway station (Guangdong) =

Railway station in Lufeng, Guangdong, China

Lufeng 陆丰
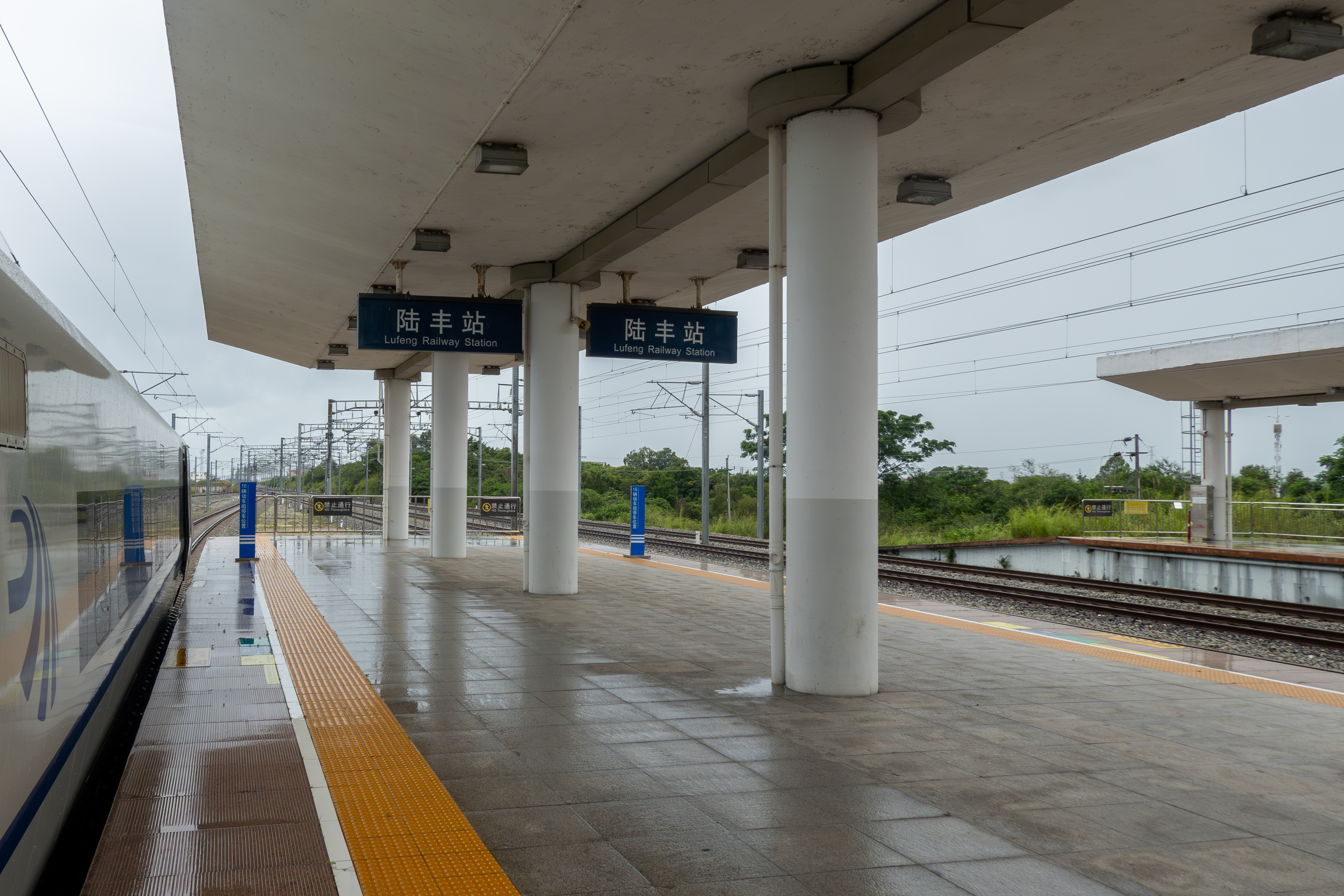

General information
- Location: Lufeng, Shanwei, Guangdong; China
- Operator: Guangzhou Railway (Group) Corp., China Railway Corporation
- Line: Xiamen–Shenzhen railway
Location

Lufeng railway station is a railway station located in Guangdong Province, People's Republic of China, on the Xiamen–Shenzhen railway which operated by Guangzhou Railway (Group) Corp., China Railway Corporation.

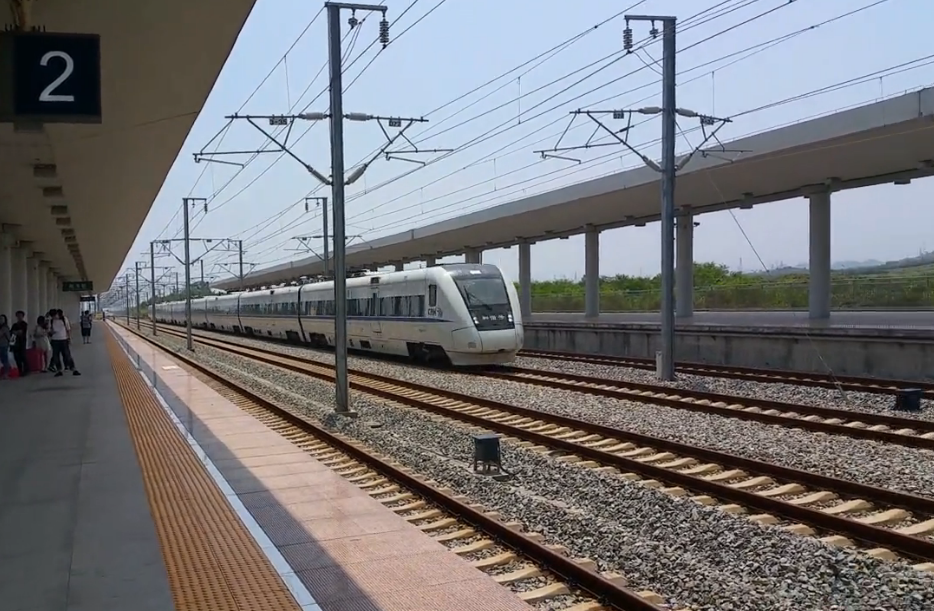
D2338 passing Lufeng railway station at approx. 200 km/h

Preceding station	China Railway High-speed	Following station
Kuitan towards Xiamen North	Xiamen–Shenzhen railway	Shanwei towards Shenzhen North
