= Eastern Guangdong intercity railway =

Railway network in Guangdong, China

Eastern Guangdong intercity railway 粤东城际铁路

Overview
- Locale: Guangdong, China

Service
- Operator(s): China Railway Guangzhou Group

History
- Planned opening: 2027

Technical
- Track gauge: 1,435 mm (4 ft 8 1/2 in) standard gauge
- Operating speed: 160 km/h (99 mph)

Eastern Guangdong intercity railway (Chinese: 粤东城际铁路; pinyin: Yuèdōng chéngjì tiělù) is a system of regional rail lines under construction in Guangdong, China. Construction started on December 17, 2021.

== Stations ==
Eastern Guangdong intercity railway is divided into 5 sections. The stations in each section:

Shantou to Jieyang Airport

- Shantou
- Longhufuzhong
- Shidaiguangchang
- Shantouyizhong
- Qichezongzhan
- Jinfengbandao
- Laicuo
- Liantang
- Didu
- Sangpushan

Chaozhou East to Jieyang Airport

- Chaozhou East
- Ruyi
- Fuyang
- Chaoshan
- Jieyang Airport T2 (reserved station)
- Jieyang Airport

Jieyang Airport to Jieyang South

- Paotai
- Yuhu
- Changmei
- Jieyang South

Jieyang South to Jieyang

- Qining
- Huangqishan
- Jieyang

Chaozhou East to Shantou

- Xiangqiao
- Bandaoguangchang
- Hanjiangxincheng (reserved station)
- Longdu
- Lianyang
- Chenghai
- Waisha
- Longhu
