= Chaoshan railway station =

Railway station in Chaozhou, Guangdong, China

Coordinates: 23°32′35″N 116°35′08″E

Chaoshan 潮汕
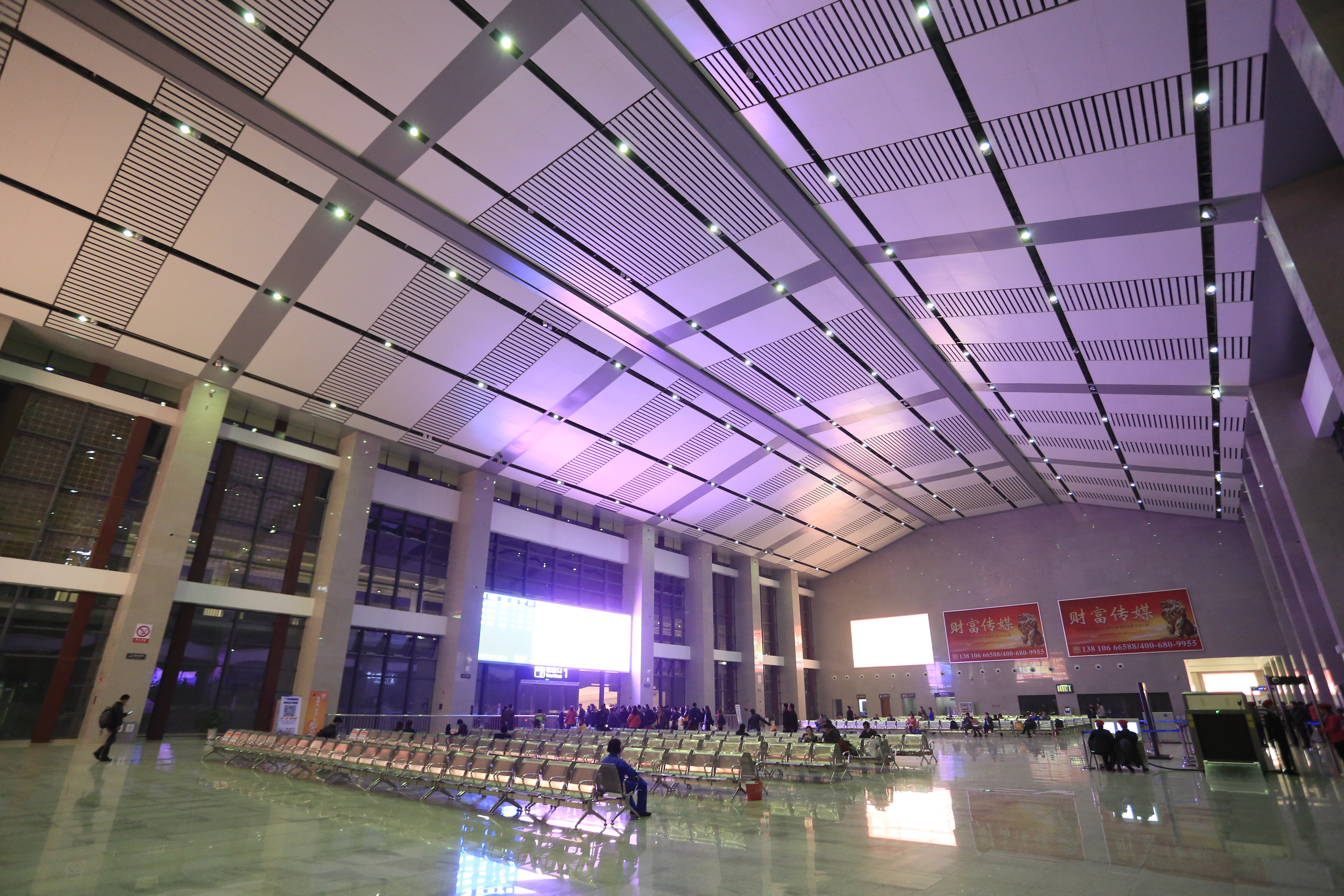

General information
- Location: Chao'an District, Chaozhou, Guangdong; China
- Operated by: Guangzhou Railway (Group) Corp., China Railway Corporation
- Lines: Xiashen Railway, Meizhou-Chaoshan railway, East Guangdong intercity railway (planned)

History
- Opened: 28 December 2013; 12 years ago
Location

Chaoshan railway station (Chinese: 潮汕站) is a railway station located in Shaxi Town (沙溪镇) in the Chao'an District of Chaozhou City, Guangdong Province, China. It is an intermediate station on the Xiamen–Shenzhen Railway (廈深鐵路) and a terminus of the Meizhou–Chaoshan high-speed railway (梅汕鐵路), and is operated by the Guangzhou Railway (Group) Corp. under China Railway Corporation.

== History ==
In the final stage of planning for Chaoshan Railway Station, the site was selected in Shaxi in 2007, and construction officially began on 6 January 2008. The station was designed as an important stop on the Xiamen–Shenzhen Railway. On 28 December 2013, with the full opening of the Xiamen–Shenzhen line, Chaoshan Station entered service.

In October 2019, the Meizhou–Chaoshan Railway was formally connected to the station, transforming it into a regional rail hub linking Chaozhou, Shantou, Jieyang, and Meizhou. To accommodate rapidly increasing passenger flows, the station underwent major expansion, adding enlarged north and south station buildings.

== Structure ==
The station serves Shantou, Jieyang and Chaozhou, and is located in the geometric centre of these cities, approximately 20 to 30 kilometres (12 to 19 mi) from each.

The station is divided into two, with a north and south station house, which can accommodate a total of 2000 passengers, covering an area of 10,000 square metres (110,000 sq ft).

== Service ==
As of January 2014, Chaoshan station is a major station on the Xiamen-Shenzhen Railway, and is a terminus station for the G-series Guangzhou-Chaoshan route, starting at Guangzhou South railway station. The station also operates D-series trains, with destinations including Shenzhen, Xiamen, Hangzhou and Shanghai. It is expected that there will be connections to Hong Kong and Meizhou. Services to Meizhou are also available after the opening of Meizhou-Chaoshan railway on 11 October 2019.

== Gallery ==
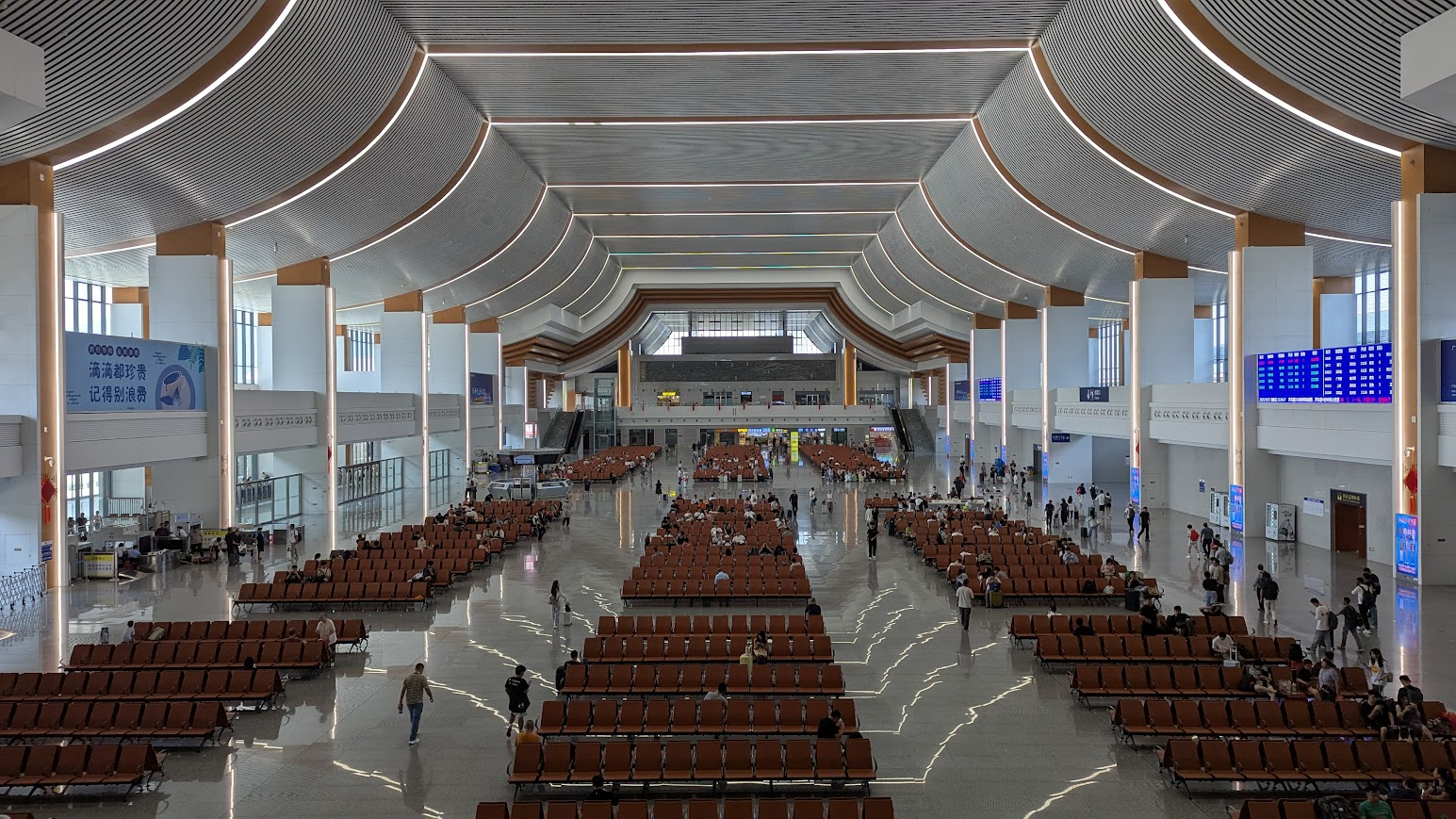
Waiting hall of the south station building

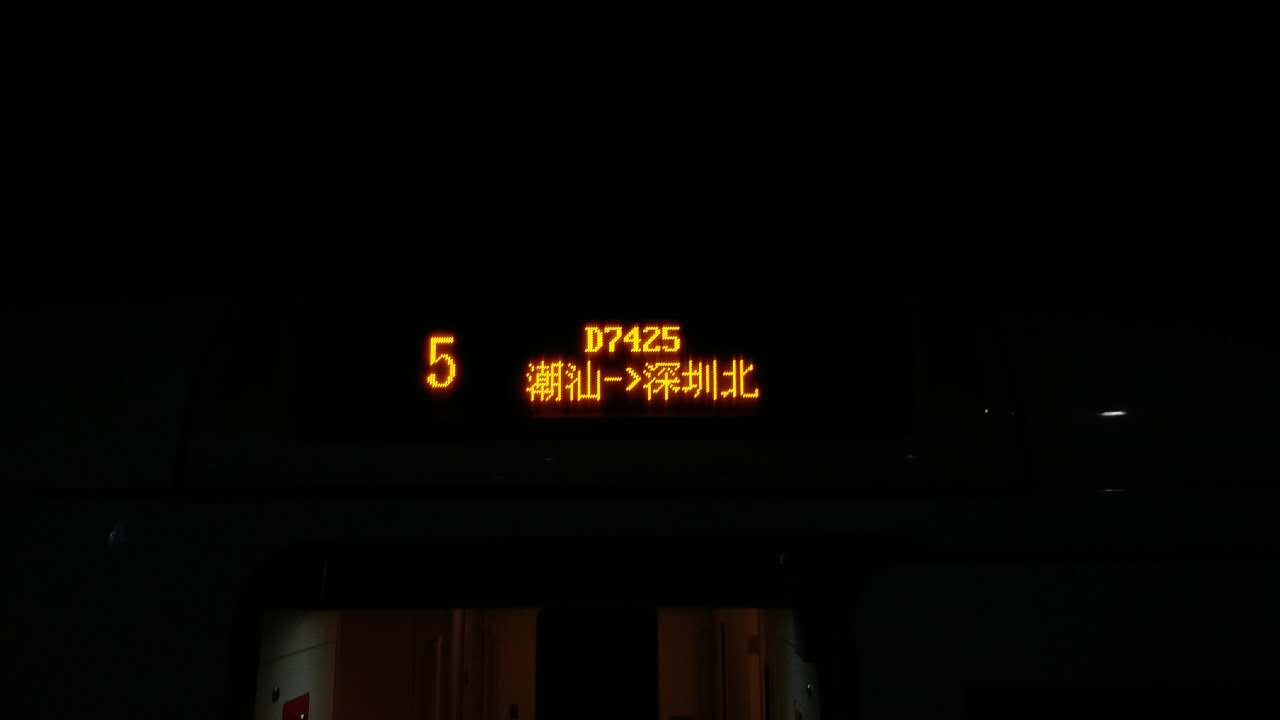
Information board of the former D7425 operating on weekends (incl. Friday) and peak periods

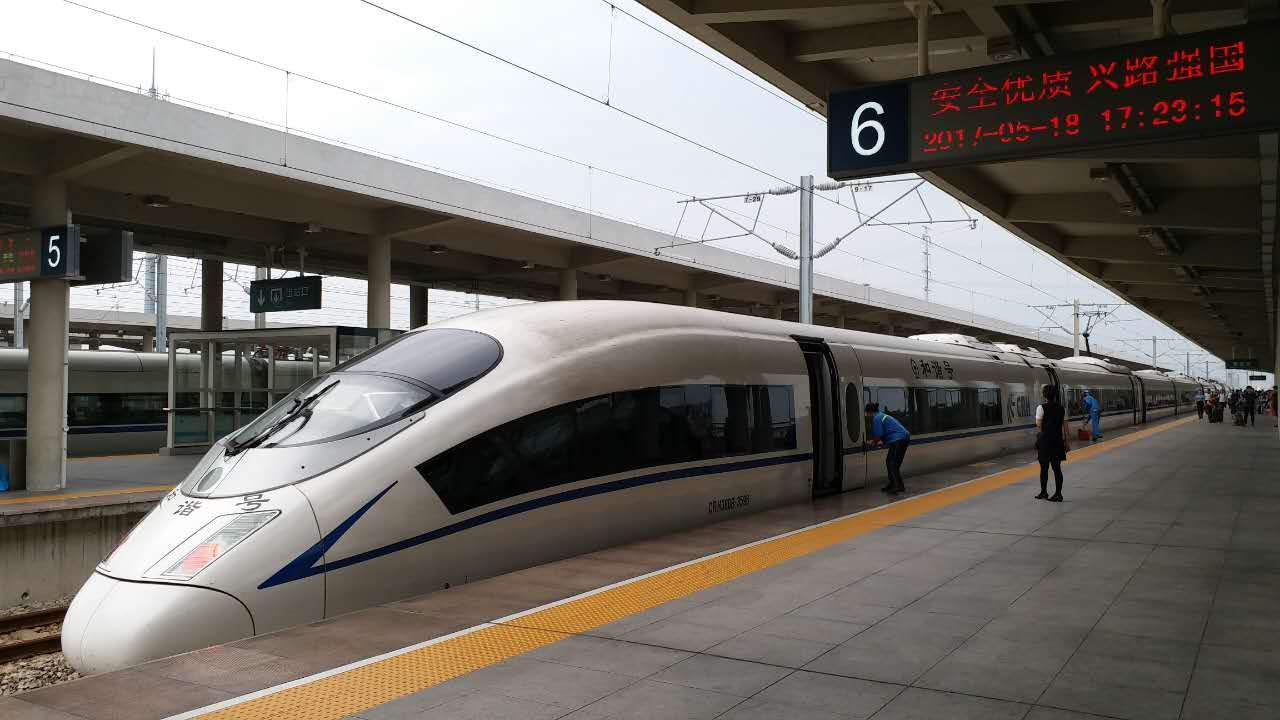
Train G6313/6316, a CRH380B staffed by CR Guangzhou.

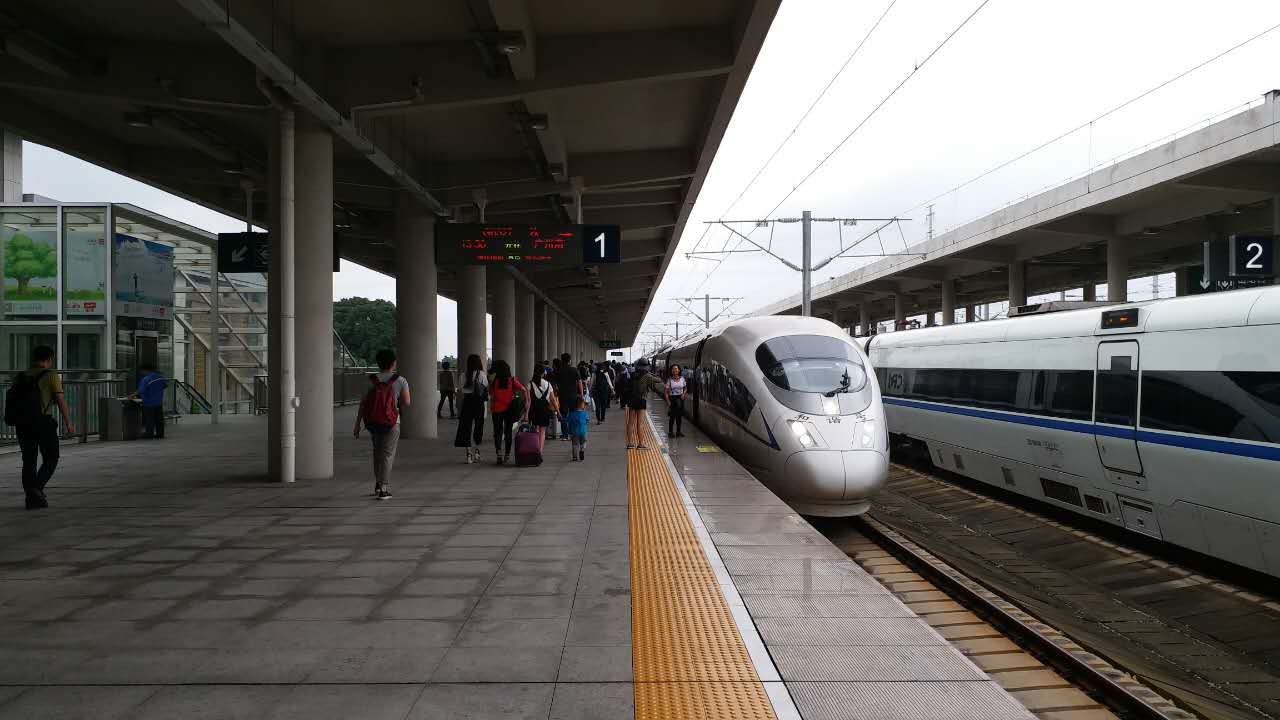
G6327/6326 (left) and D3112 (right) meeting at Chaoshan railway station (Platforms 1 & 2)

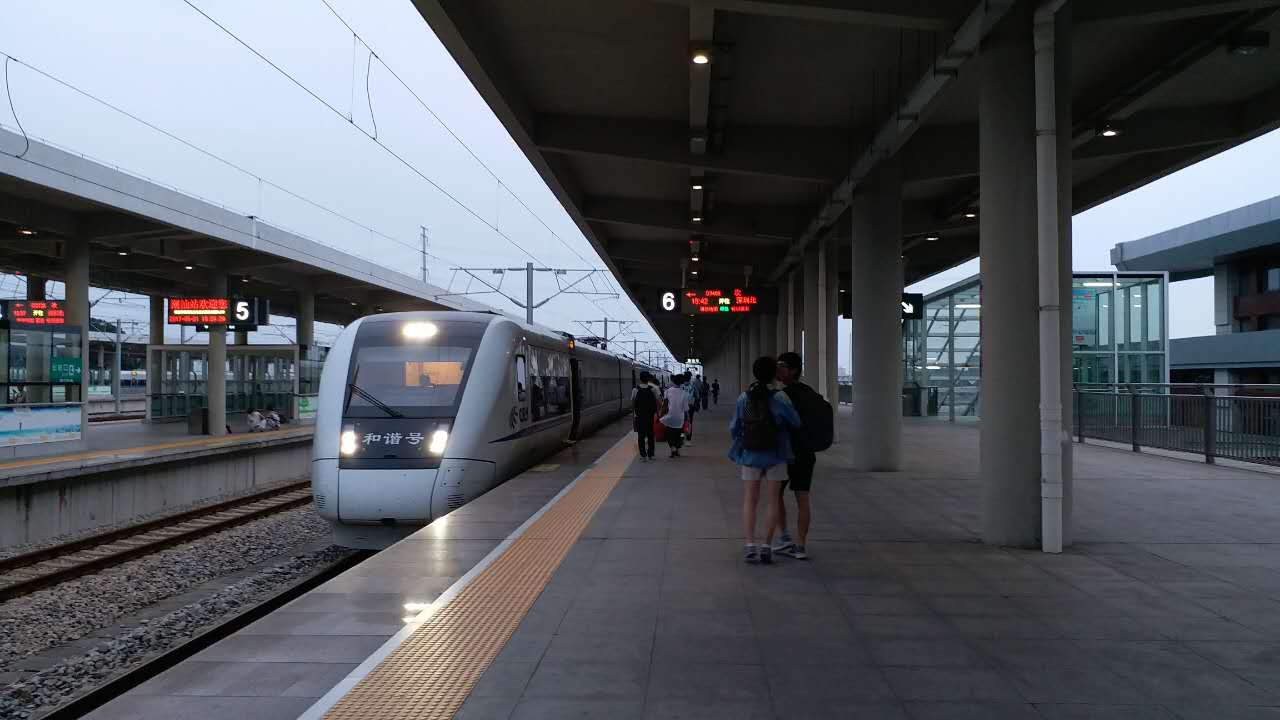
Former D7405 which originated at Chaoshan railway station

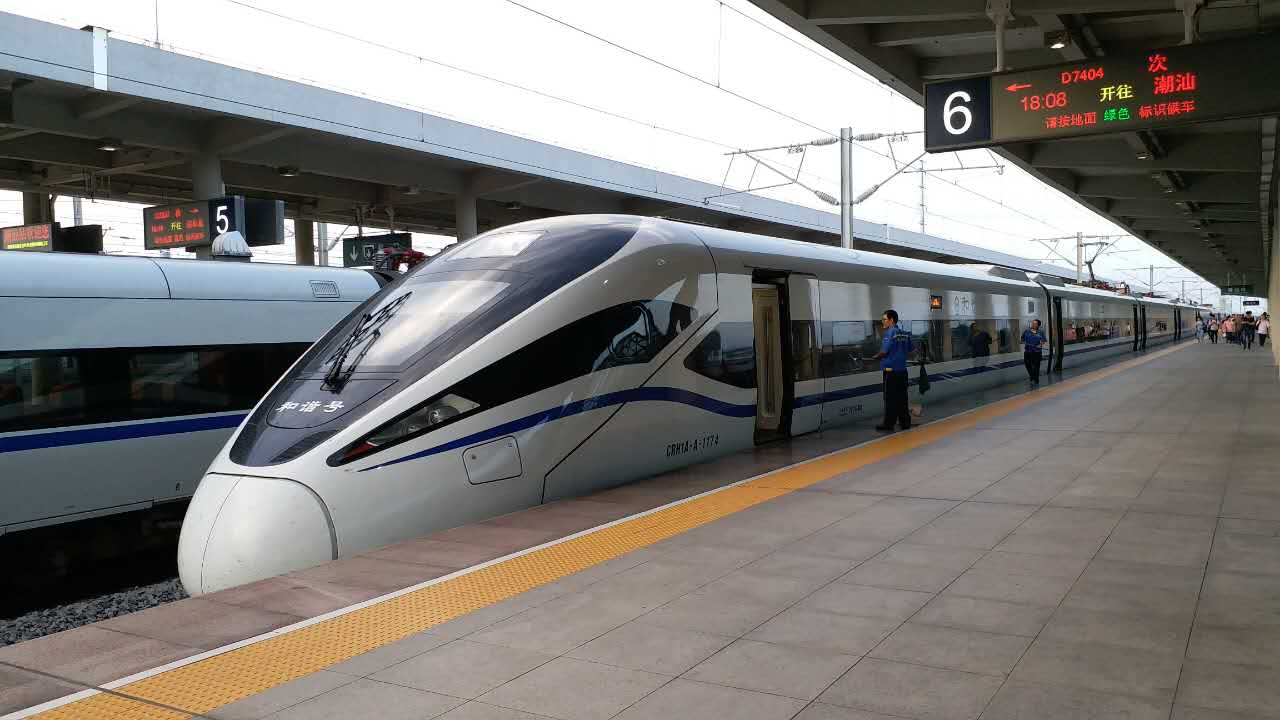
Former D7404 terminating at Chaoshan railway station

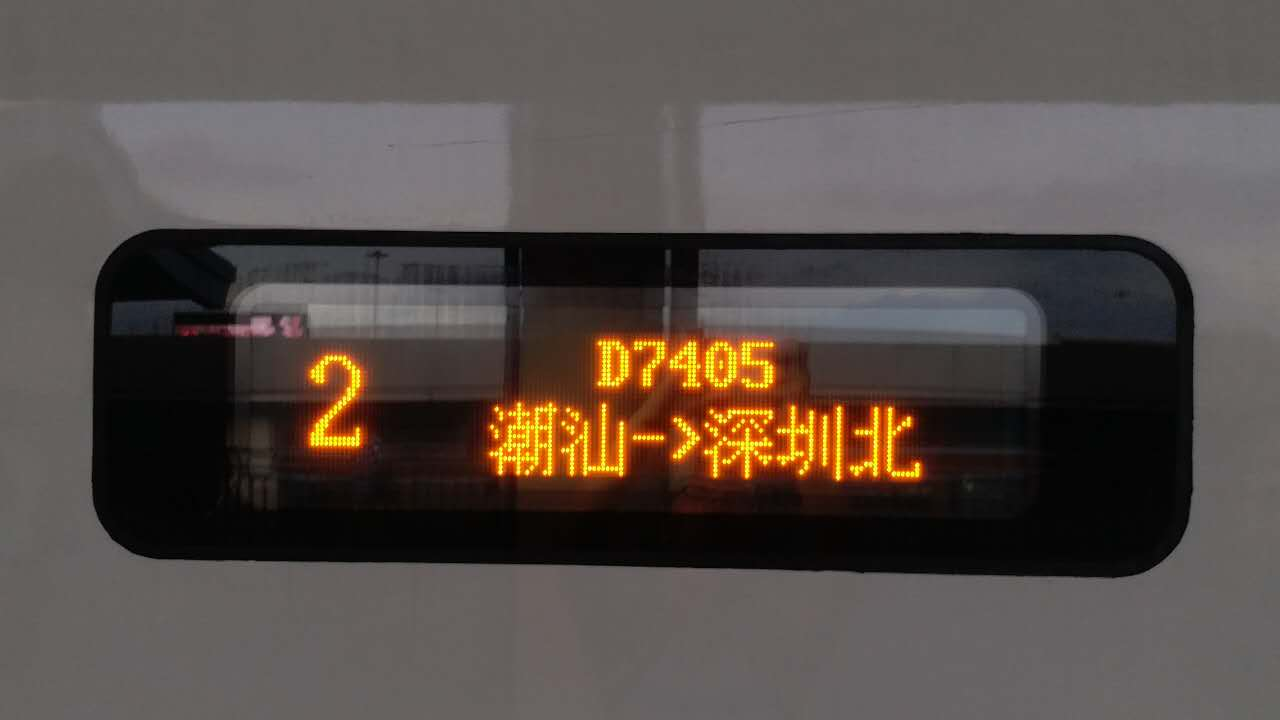
Info board of CRH1A-A-1174 about to operate as (the former) D7405

Preceding station	China Railway High-speed	Following station
Raoping towards Xiamen North	Xiamen–Shenzhen railway	Chaoyang towards Shenzhen North
Jieyang Airport towards Meizhou West	Meizhou–Chaoshan railway	Terminus
