= Meizhou West railway station =

Railway station in Meizhou, Guangdong, China

Meizhou West 梅州西
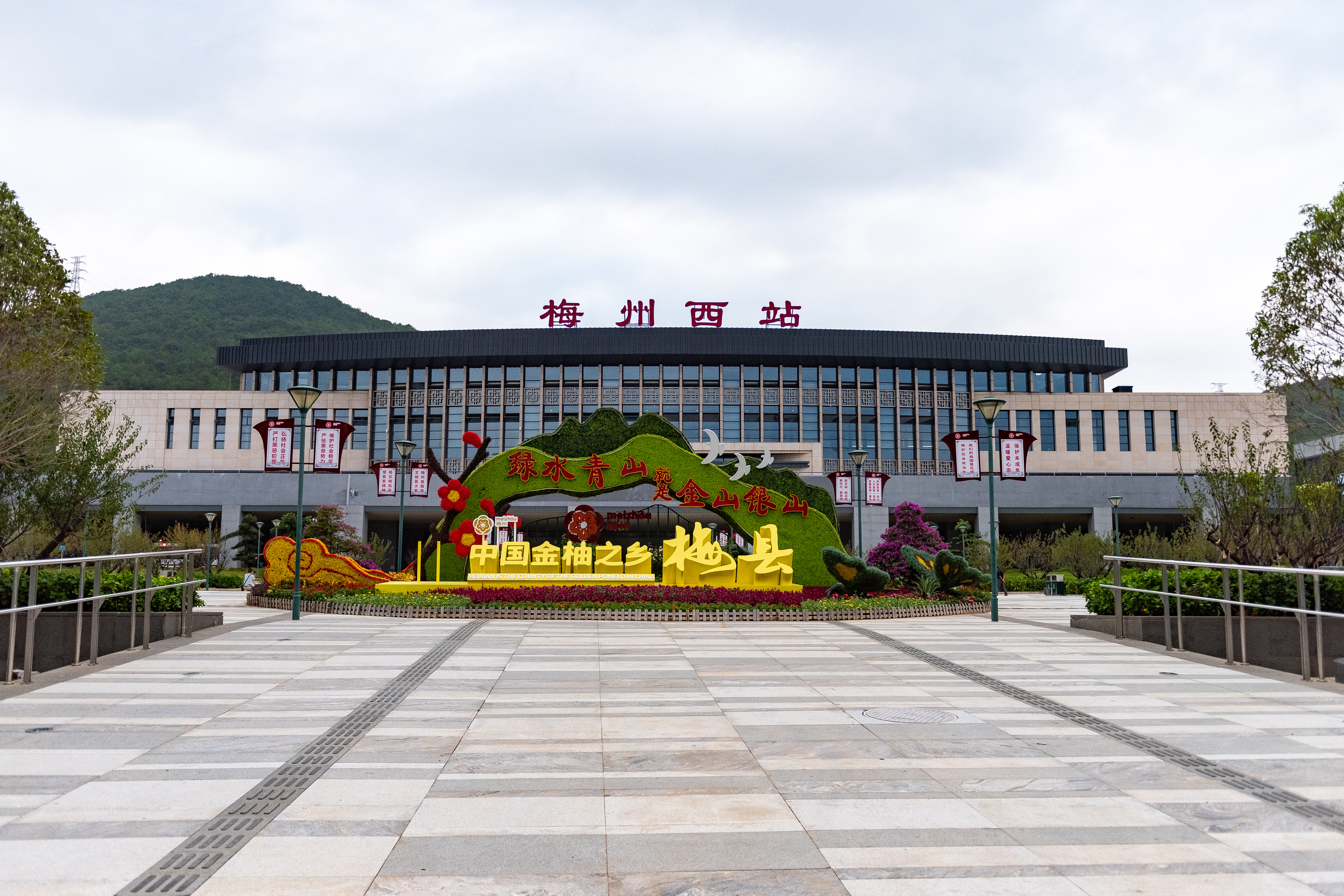

General information
- Location: Kuigang Village, Nankou Town, Meixian District, Meizhou, Guangdong, China
- Coordinates: 24.253438°N 116.043129°E
- Operated by: China Railway Guangzhou Group
- Lines: Meizhou–Chaoshan railway Meizhou–Longchuan high-speed railway
- Platforms: 3
- Tracks: 8

Other information
- Station code: TMIS: 65989; Pinyin: MZX; Telephone: MZA
Location

Meizhou West railway station is a high-speed railway station located in Kuigang Village, Nankou Town, Meixian District, Meizhou, Guangdong, China, near the Meizhou–Heyuan highway (part of G25/G78), and also near County Road 969. It is the northern terminus of the Meizhou–Chaoshan railway, and the temporary eastern terminus of the Guangdong section of the Longyan–Longchuan high-speed railway, expecting to connect the section in Fujian in the future. It started service on 11 October 2019.

== History ==
The station began construction at 2014. The tracks of the Meizhou-Chaoshan railway were fully completed on 30 June 2019, and service commenced on 11 October.

The building of the railway station was completed by April 2019.

=== Commencement ===
In response to the opening of the Meizhou-Shantou railway, the station held the opening ceremony on the morning of October 11, 2019, and was addressed by a number of guests including Wu Xiaohui, the Executive Deputy Mayor of the Meizhou Municipal Government. He announced the opening of the railway, during which cultural performances were held at the station, including a flash mob performance of the song "Me and My Nation", Chinese wind instrument performance, poetry recitation in the Meizhou dialect and drama performance. Later, the guests boarded train G6359 towards Guangzhou South railway station.

== Structure ==
Meizhou West Station has a construction area of 12,000 square meters and a waiting room area of 7,109 square meters. It has a capacity of 1500 people. The overall shape of the station is arc-shaped, and the design concept of "the world's Hakka capital" reflects the characteristics of "unity and union" (Chinese: 团结、团聚、团圆) of the Hakka people.

== Departures ==
As of September 2019 there were 20 arrivals and departures from Meizhou West railway station:

- 4 G-series trains:
  - 3 to Guangzhou South railway station
  - 1 to Zhuhai railway station
- 16 D-series trains:
  - 4 to Shenzhen North railway station
  - 4 to Shantou railway station
  - 3 to Chaoshan railway station
  - 3 to Guangzhou East railway station
  - 1 to Yichang East railway station
  - 1 to Xiamen railway station
