= Guangzhou–Meizhou–Shantou railway =

Railway line in Guangdong, China

The Guangzhou–Meizhou–Shantou railway (simplified Chinese: 广梅汕铁路; traditional Chinese: 廣梅汕鐵路; pinyin: guǎngméishàn tiělù) is a railway in Guangdong Province, China. The electrified railway, also known as the Guangmeishan railway, is named after the three primary cities along route Guangzhou, Meizhou and Shantou, and has a total length of 480 km (298 mi). The line was built from 1991 to 1995. The Changping to Huizhou section was opened on 1 July 1992. It extends across the eastern half of Guangdong Province from Guangzhou to Meizhou in the interior and then south to Shantou on the coast. Cities along the route include Guangzhou, Dongguan, Huizhou, Heyuan, Longchuan, Xingning, Meizhou, Fengshun, Jieyang, Chaozhou and Shantou. In 1996, the Guangzhou-Longchuan section of the line became the southernmost section of the Beijing–Kowloon railway.

== Rail connections ==
- Guangzhou: Beijing–Guangzhou railway, Guangzhou–Shenzhen railway, Guangzhou–Maoming railway

== See also ==
- List of railways in China
- Meizhou–Shantou railway
