= Lufeng railway station (Yunnan) =

Railway station in Lufeng, Yunnan, China

Coordinates: 24.5613°N 103.0916°E

Lufeng 禄丰
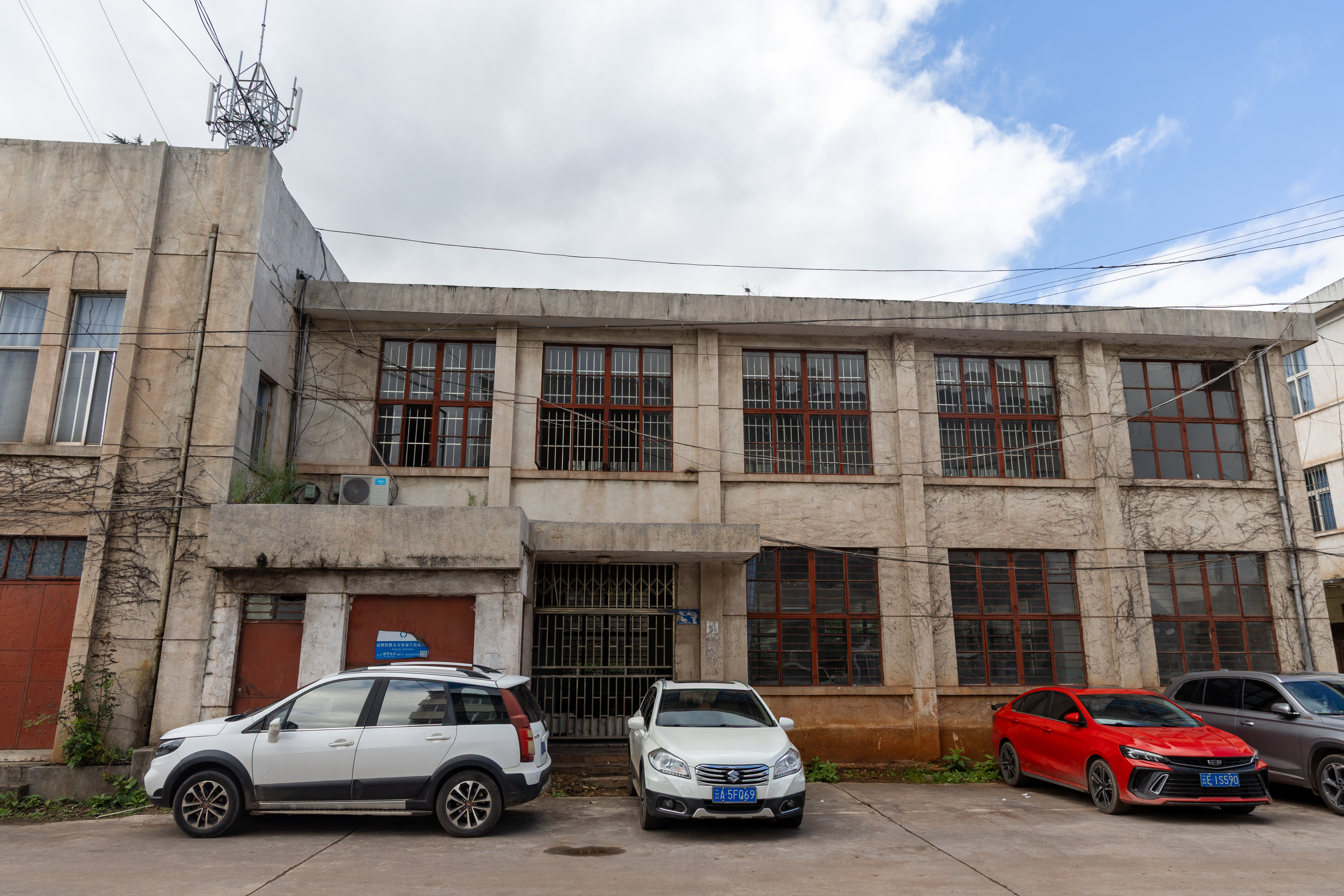

General information
- Location: Lufeng County, Chuxiong Yi Autonomous Prefecture, Yunnan; China
- Operator: Kunming Railway Bureau, China Railway Corporation
- Line: Chengdu–Kunming Railway

History
- Opened: 1966
Location

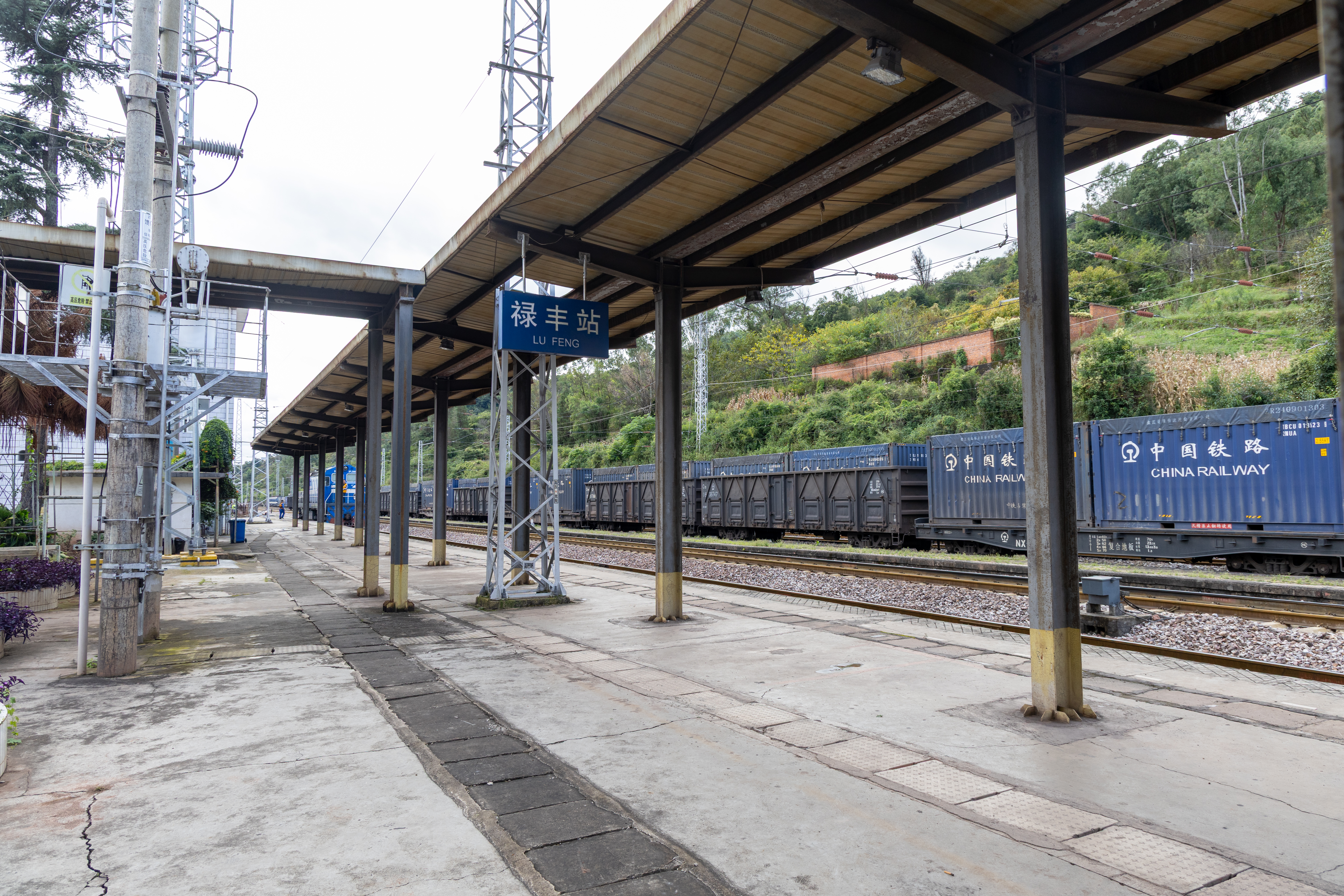
Platform

Lufeng railway station (Chinese: 禄丰站; pinyin: Lùfēng Zhàn) is a railway station of Chengdu–Kunming Railway in Lufeng County, Yunnan, China.

== See also ==
- Chengdu–Kunming Railway
