= Huanggang River =

River in Guangdong, China

Huanggang River Phoenix River (鳳江)
- Location within Guangdong
- Native name: 黃岡河 (Chinese)

Location
- Country: People's Republic of China
- Province: Guangdong
- City: Chaozhou
- County: Raoping County

Physical characteristics
- Source: Raoping County, Guangdong
- Mouth: Zhelin Bay (柘林灣)
  - location: Bizhou Island (碧洲島), Raoping, Guangdong
  - coordinates: 23°37′09″N 117°02′17″E
- Length: 87.2 km (54.2 mi)
- Basin size: 1,621 km^{2} (626 mi^{2})
- Width
  - average: 0.2 km (0.12 mi)

Basin features
- Cities: Chaozhou

Huanggang River (Chinese: 黃岡河; Teochew: Ng-gang Ho), also known as Phoenix River (Chinese: 鳳江; Teochew: Hong Kang), is the largest and most important waterway in Raoping County (饒平縣), the easternmost county of the Chaozhou (Teochew) region. Remarkably, it is the only river in China that both originates within Raoping and flows directly into the sea without ever crossing county borders.

The river rises at Dayuping (大崬坪) in Shangrao Town (上饒鎮) and serves as a vital artery for the region. Its main course flows from north to south, passing through eleven towns in Raoping County — Shangrao Town (上饒鎮), Raoyang Town (饒洋鎮), Xinfeng Town (新豐鎮), Sanrao Town (三饒鎮), Tangxi Town (湯溪鎮), Fushan Town (浮山鎮), Fubin Town (浮濱鎮), Zhangxi Town (樟溪鎮), Gaotang Town (高堂鎮), Lianrao Town (聯饒鎮), and Huanggang Town (黃岡鎮) — before emptying into the South China Sea at Shimiantou (石黽頭) in Bizhou Village (碧洲村), Huanggang Town. Along its course, it is joined by nine major tributaries.

Separated from the Han River (韓江)—the principal river system of the Teochew region—by a belt of hilly terrain, the Huanggang River flows close to Zhao'an County (詔安縣) in Zhangzhou, Fujian. It runs for 87.2 kilometres (54.2 mi) and drains a basin of 1,621 square kilometres (626 sq mi).

== History ==
The midstream reaches of the Huanggang River have yielded significant prehistoric archaeological discoveries, adding cultural and historical depth to the river's geographical importance.

The area around the Huanggang River is rich in Ming and Qing dynasty heritage sites, the most prominent of which is the Daoyun Tower (道韻樓). Designated as a National Key Cultural Relic Protection Unit (全國重點文物保護單位), it is the largest octagonal earthen building (八角形土樓) in the world. Sanrao Ancestral Hall (三饒宗祠), also known as the Zhan Ancestral Hall (詹厝祠) or the Great Ancestral Hall of the Zhan Clan (詹氏大宗祠), is located in Sanrao Town, Raoping County. Built during the Wanli reign (萬曆年間) of the Ming dynasty, the structure showcases the refined craftsmanship characteristic of the Chaoshan region and covers a total floor area of 738 square meters. It is now designated as a county‑level protected cultural heritage site in Raoping.

The City God Temple of Sanrao (三饒城隍廟) was built in the sixth year of the Hongzhi reign of the Ming dynasty (1493 AD, 弘治六年) and has a history of more than 500 years. Throughout the Ming and Qing periods, the temple underwent multiple renovations and enjoyed flourishing worship. However, during the Cultural Revolution, the ancient structure suffered repeated misfortunes: the temple's statues were gradually stolen, the gilded woodcarvings on its beams were entirely gouged out, and many of its cultural relics sustained varying degrees of damage.

The region also contains several other early‑Qing and Qing‑dynasty structures, including the five‑sided Xiangjiang Tower (向江樓) from the early Qing period, the Lixiu Tower (裏秀樓) built during the Qianlong reign, the Zhang Clan Great Ancestral Hall (張氏大宗祠) built during the Qianlong reign, the Liu Clan Great Ancestral Hall (劉氏大宗祠) dating to the mid‑Ming dynasty, the Huang Clan Great Ancestral Hall (黃氏大宗祠) constructed during the Kangxi reign, and the Qiu Clan Lantern Ancestral Hall (邱氏彩燈祠) from the Ming period.
