= Meizhou–Chaoshan high-speed railway =

Railway line in Guangdong, China

Overview
- Status: Operational
- Owner: China Railway
- Locale: Guangdong province, China
- Termini: Meizhou West; Chaoshan
- Stations: 7

Service
- Type: Passenger dedicated railway
- Services: 1
- Operator(s): China Railway Guangzhou Group

History
- Opened: 11 Oct 2019

Technical
- Line length: 122.4 km (76 mi)
- Track gauge: 1,435 mm (4 ft 8 1/2 in)
- Electrification: 50 Hz 25 kV (AC)
- Operating speed: 250 km/h (155 mph)

Meizhou–Chaoshan high-speed railway, a passenger-dedicated line (PDL), opened for revenue service on 11 October 2019, connecting two principal cities in Guangdong province, Meizhou and Chaoshan.

The 122 km (76 mi) long railway has a design speed of 250 km/h (160 mph). The line starts from a new Meizhou West railway station in the north, passes through Meizhou, Jieyang and Chaozhou connecting with Xiamen–Shenzhen railway and the Shantou line at Chaoshan.

Meizhou–Chaoshan high-speed rail is a joint initiative of the China Railway Corporation and Guangdong Provincial Government, its construction required an estimated investment of 14.5 billion yuan. Under construction since 2014, the line has intermediate stations at, Shejiang North, Jianqiao, Fengshun East, Jieyang and Jieyang Airport.

In September 2019 there were 20 arrivals and departures from Meizhou West railway station, the departures were:

- 4 G-series trains:
  - 3 to Guangzhou South, and
  - 1 to Zhuhai.
- 16 D-series trains:
  - 4 to Shenzhen North,
  - 4 to Shantou,
  - 3 to Chaoshan,
  - 3 to Guangzhou East,
  - 1 to Yichang East, and
  - 1 to Xiamen.

Chaoshan railway station has a wider variety of trains and destinations being both the terminus of this line and an intermediate station on the Xiamen–Shenzhen railway. The intermediate stations have a lower level of service with some of the trains stopping at some of the stations, for example Shejiang North station has only three departures per day in each direction.
