= Raoping County =

Raoping 饶平县 Jaoping
- County
- Location of the seat in Guangdong
- Coordinates: 23°39′50″N 117°00′14″E
- Country: People's Republic of China
- Province: Guangdong
- Prefecture-level city: Chaozhou

Area
  - Total: 1,670 km^{2} (640 sq mi)

Population (2020)
  - Total: 817,442
  - Density: 489/km^{2} (1,270/sq mi)
- Time zone: UTC+8 (China Standard)
- Website: http://www.raoping.gov.cn/

Raoping County (postal: Jaoping; simplified Chinese: 饶平县; traditional Chinese: 饒平縣; pinyin: Ráopíng Xiàn) is a county in eastern Guangdong Province, bordering Fujian Province to the east, facing the South China Sea to the south, Xiangqiao District to the southwest, Chenghai District of Shantou City, Chao'an District to the west, and Dabu County of Meizhou City to the north. The city with the same name has 394,636 inhabitants (2020).

It is under the jurisdiction of the prefecture-level city of Chaozhou. Chaoshan Min and Hakka (Raoping dialect) are spoken in Raoping.

Raoping is famous for its seafood and fruits.

== Geography ==
Raoping County sits at the edge of the Chaoshan Plain and is one of Guangdong's mountainous counties. Its terrain leans from mountains to sea, with higher elevations in the north and lower lands in the south. The county has 13 islands; the largest is Haishan Island, now connected to the mainland and effectively a peninsula, covering 46.9 square kilometres. Seven peaks rise above 1,000 metres, with Xiyan Mountain the tallest at 1,256 metres. The Huanggang River is the county's largest waterway, stretching 87.2 kilometres, flowing through 12 towns before entering the South China Sea. Raoping has three major bays — Zhelin, Gaosha, and Dacheng. Zhelin Bay is the largest, covering 68 square kilometres. The coastline runs 136 kilometres, and the main port is Sanbaimen Harbour.

== Climate ==
Climate data for Raoping, elevation 45 m (148 ft), (1991–2020 normals, extremes 1981–present)
Month	Jan	Feb	Mar	Apr	May	Jun	Jul	Aug	Sep	Oct	Nov	Dec	Year
Record high °C (°F)	29.3 (84.7)	26.7 (80.1)	28.5 (83.3)	31.3 (88.3)	35.1 (95.2)	35.2 (95.4)	38.6 (101.5)	36.0 (96.8)	35.1 (95.2)	34.1 (93.4)	31.0 (87.8)	27.4 (81.3)	38.6 (101.5)
Mean daily maximum °C (°F)	18.9 (66.0)	19.3 (66.7)	21.4 (70.5)	25.1 (77.2)	28.4 (83.1)	30.6 (87.1)	32.3 (90.1)	32.2 (90.0)	31.4 (88.5)	28.9 (84.0)	25.4 (77.7)	21.0 (69.8)	26.2 (79.2)
Daily mean °C (°F)	14.3 (57.7)	14.9 (58.8)	17.2 (63.0)	21.1 (70.0)	24.7 (76.5)	27.3 (81.1)	28.5 (83.3)	28.3 (82.9)	27.3 (81.1)	24.3 (75.7)	20.6 (69.1)	16.3 (61.3)	22.1 (71.7)
Mean daily minimum °C (°F)	11.1 (52.0)	12.0 (53.6)	14.4 (57.9)	18.3 (64.9)	22.0 (71.6)	24.8 (76.6)	25.6 (78.1)	25.4 (77.7)	24.2 (75.6)	20.8 (69.4)	17.0 (62.6)	12.8 (55.0)	19.0 (66.3)
Record low °C (°F)	0.3 (32.5)	2.7 (36.9)	4.4 (39.9)	9.6 (49.3)	15.4 (59.7)	17.2 (63.0)	21.4 (70.5)	21.9 (71.4)	18.1 (64.6)	11.7 (53.1)	5.3 (41.5)	0.5 (32.9)	0.3 (32.5)
Average precipitation mm (inches)	39.0 (1.54)	49.1 (1.93)	97.3 (3.83)	138.7 (5.46)	194.8 (7.67)	270.4 (10.65)	215.2 (8.47)	271.1 (10.67)	144.9 (5.70)	32.3 (1.27)	39.3 (1.55)	41.4 (1.63)	1,533.5 (60.37)
Average precipitation days (≥ 0.1 mm)	6.4	9.5	11.2	12.1	14.7	16.9	12.6	14.2	9.3	3.3	4.6	6.1	120.9
Average relative humidity (%)	73	77	78	80	82	85	82	82	77	71	71	70	77
Mean monthly sunshine hours	157.8	122.9	124.2	137.4	161.8	185.6	257.9	229.5	214.9	221.6	189.5	176.1	2,179.2
Percentage possible sunshine	47	38	33	36	39	46	62	58	59	62	58	53	49
Source: China Meteorological Administration>All-time record low

== Famous people ==
- Limahong
- Liu Kun
- Zhan Antai (Sinologist, historian, calligrapher)
- Zhang Jingsheng (Sexologist)

== See also ==
- Chaoshan
- Chaozhou
