= Xiamen–Shenzhen railway =

Chinese railway line

Hangzhou–Fuzhou–Shenzhen high-speed railway Xiamen–Shenzhen Section 杭福深高速铁路厦深段
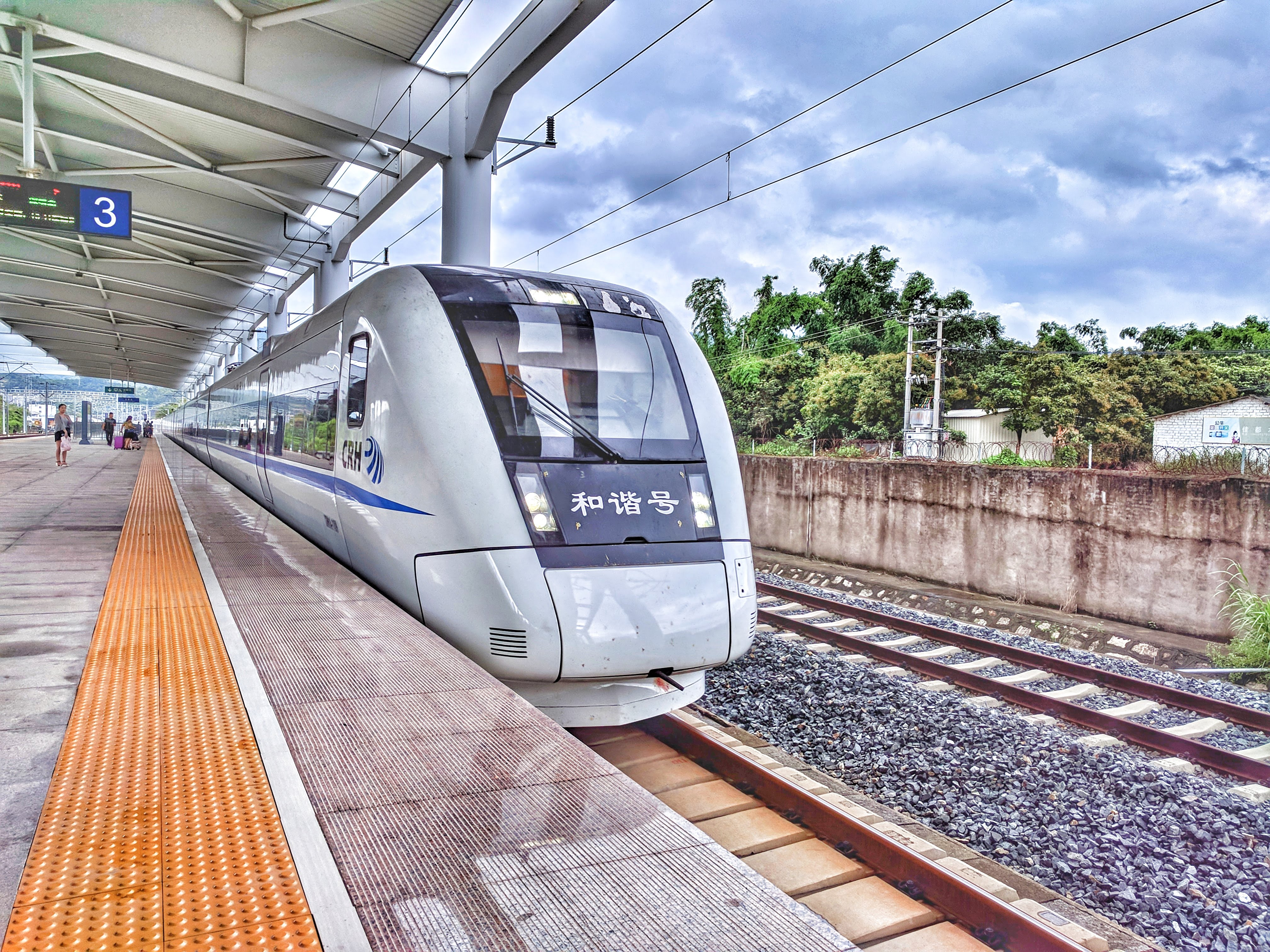
- CRH1A in Yunxiao station

Overview
- Owner: China Railway
- Locale: Fujian and Guangdong
- Termini: Xiamen North; Shenzhen North
- Stations: 19

Service
- Type: High-speed rail, Heavy rail
- System: China Railway High-speed
- Operator(s): CR Guangzhou; CR Nanchang

History
- Opened: 28 December 2013 (11 years ago)

Technical
- Line length: 502.4 km (312 mi)
- Track gauge: 1,435 mm (4 ft 8 1/2 in) standard gauge
- Minimum radius: 4,500 m (2.8 mi; 14,800 ft)
- Electrification: 25 kV 50 Hz AC (overhead lines)
- Operating speed: 250 km/h (160 mph)
- Signalling: Automatic closed block
- Maximum incline: 0.6%

Xiamen–Shenzhen railway
- Simplified Chinese: 厦深铁路
- Traditional Chinese: 廈深鐵路
Transcriptions
Standard Mandarin
- Hanyu Pinyin: Xiàshēn Tiělù
Yue: Cantonese
- Jyutping: haa^{6}sam^{1} tit^{3}lou^{6}
Southern Min
- Hokkien POJ: hā-chhim thih-lō͘

Hangzhou–Fuzhou–Shenzhen HSR, Xiamen–Shenzhen section
- Simplified Chinese: 杭福深高速铁路厦深段
- Traditional Chinese: 杭福深高速鐵路廈深段
Transcriptions
Standard Mandarin
- Hanyu Pinyin: Hángfúshēn gāosù tiělù Xià-Shēn duàn
Yue: Cantonese
- Jyutping: hong^{4}fuk^{1}sam^{1} gou^{1}cuk^{1} tit^{3}lou^{6} haa^{6}sam^{1} dyun^{6}
Southern Min
- Hokkien POJ: hâng-hok-chhim ko sok thih-lō͘ hā-chhim tōaⁿ

The Xiamen–Shenzhen railway, also known as the Xiashen railway, (Chinese: 厦深铁路) is a dual-track, electrified, high-speed rail line connecting the major coastal cities of Xiamen in Fujian and Shenzhen in Guangdong. The line has a total length of 502.4 km (312.2 mi) and forms part of China's Hangzhou–Fuzhou–Shenzhen passenger-dedicated railway. Construction of the Xiashen line began on November 23, 2007, and the line entered into operation on December 28, 2013.

The line is designed for trains running at top speeds of 250 kilometres per hour (155 mph), and reduced travel time between Xiamen and Shenzhen from 11 hours to 3 hours and 40 minutes upon its commencement of operations. The speed of the line was increased, starting on April 10, 2021, resulting in a further reduction in travel time to 2 hours and 30 minutes Currently, CR Guangzhou offers C-train services from Shenzhen North to Shenzhen Pingshan, Huizhou South and Shanwei.

== Route ==
The Xiamen–Shenzhen railway follows the rugged southern coast of China. Major cities and towns along route include Zhangzhou, Zhao'an, Raoping, the Chaoshan region (Chaozhou and Shantou), Puning, Shanwei, Huidong and Huizhou.

The railway will be partially paralleled by the Shenzhen–Shanwei and Shanwei–Shantou high-speed railways, currently under construction.

== History ==
The Xiamen–Shenzhen railway is the first railway to be built on the southern coast of China. Most high-speed rail lines in China follow the routes of older conventional railways, but there were no railways on the southeast coast before the arrival of high-speed rail.

Historically, the southeast coastal region relied on maritime transportation, and rugged terrain made railway construction more expensive. In the first half of the 20th century, warfare and political instability delayed railway construction. During the Cold War, the southeast coast faced the threat of invasion from Republic of China on Taiwan and all railways were built inland. Only when political tensions across the Taiwan Strait eased in the late 1990s did planning of the Xiashen Line proceed.

Construction of the Xiashen Line commenced in November 2007 and the line was initially expected to open in 2011. But the anticipated completion was repeatedly delayed due to further safety reviews and inspections after the Wenzhou High-Speed rail crash. In December 2012, the anticipated opening date was pushed to October 2013. Test runs did not commence until November 2013. The line officially opened on December 28, 2013 with trains running from Shenzhen North to Shanghai Hongqiao.

In 2017, cumulative ridership of the line exceeded 53 million passengers, with daily services increased to 101 trains in each direction.

In February 2021, it was announced that operating speeds on the line would be increased from 200 to 250 kilometres per hour (124 to 155 mph) starting on 10 April, resulting in the fastest journeys between Xiamen North and Shenzhen North being reduced to 2.5 hours.

== Rail connections ==
- Xiamen: Fuzhou–Xiamen railway, Yingtan–Xiamen railway
- Zhangzhou: Longyan–Xiamen railway
- Chaoshan: Guangzhou–Meizhou–Shantou railway towards Shantou railway station.
- Chaoshan: Meizhou–Chaoshan railway towards Meizhou West railway station.
- Shanwei: Guangzhou–Shanwei high-speed railway and Shantou–Shanwei high-speed railway, both under construction.
- Shenzhen Pingshan: Guangzhou–Shenzhen railway - at some point after leaving the station in the southwest direction, trains can switch to the northwest-bound direction of the GuangShen railway towards Guangzhou East station / Guangzhou station, or vice versa.
- Shenzhen North: Beijing–Guangzhou–Shenzhen–Hong Kong high-speed railway and Ganzhou–Shenzhen high-speed railway

== See also ==
- List of railways in China
