= Dragon Aromatics =

Chinese chemical company

Dragon Aromatics Company, or Tenglong Aromatic Hydrocarbon (Chinese: 腾龙芳烃（漳州）有限公司), is a Chinese chemical company on the coast of Fujian province, Southeast China. Until 2018 it was owned and run by Taiwan's Xianglu Group. Its plant in Gulei was constructed in 2009 and has been producing paraxylene and orthoxylene for polyester fiber and garment manufacturers since 2013. In April 2015, an oil spill caused a massive explosion and fire, which burnt for 4 days and led to the evacuation of 30,000 residents.

After a 3=year repair, Dragon Aromatics was reorganised and renamed Fuhaichuang, 90% owned by the Chinese government via Fuhua Gulei Petrochemical Co Ltd, and 10% by Dragon Aromatics, Taiwan's Xianglu Group.

== Location ==
The Dragon Aromatics petrochemical plant is located in the port of Gulei, Zhangpu County, which is in China's southernmost Fujian province. As of 2015, the company name contained Zhangzhou, the main city of the prefecture. Gulei lies within Dongshan Bay, on a peninsula formed by the Zhang River estuary at the Taiwan Strait of the Pacific ocean. Gulei peninsula was once famous for carrot production, and the area used in flower and fruit production.

== Chemical operations ==
The plant makes paraxylene (PX), a feedstock in the production of polyester chips and fiber. It uses a production process called ParamaX, licensed by a French company named Axens, seated in Rueil-Malmaison, which occurs in two main stages:

In a 4-million-tons per year (tpy) condensate distillation unit (often referred to as condensate splitter), natural-gas condensate, referred to as condensate, is processed to light naphtha and heavy naphtha and naphtha hydrotreating for purification. The PX facility was originally designed to turn heavy naphtha feedstock into PX by "aromizing" or mixed aromatics production, paraxylene purification, C8 aromatics isomerization (xylenes and ethylbenzene) and aromatics transalkylation. The one million tonnes a year of light naphtha were supposed to be marketed to Chinese plants making ethylene. The original plan of using heavy naphtha as feedstock was later modified to add a condensate splitter.

Besides PX, the PX facility creates other aromatics components (over 1.0 tpy per 2007 plan): It produces orthoxylene (160,000 tons per year (tpy) per 2007 plan), needed to make plasticizers and resins in paints, coating and auto parts industries. The plant also produces benzene (228,000 tpy per 2007 plan), "the starting block of a large set of polymeric materials such as nylon fibers, polystyrene for plastic packaging, polycarbonates for impact-resistant glass substitutes and compact disks".

As of 2015, the plant included two PX production lines and a benzene unit, each with a capacity to produce 800,000 tpy of paraxylene per unit (and 1.6 million tpy total) and 240,000 tpy of benzene, which was twice the PX (800,000 tpy) and about 5% more of the benzene (228,000 tpy) that had been planned in 2007.

By the end of April 2015, the plant was to increase condensate splitting to 5.5 million tonnes a year (137,000 barrels per day).

== History ==
Dragon Aromatics is a subsidiary of the Taiwanese Xianglu Dragon Group, owned by Taiwanese expatriate tycoon Chen Yu-hao. In 2004, Dragon Aromatics was based in Xiamen province, and received a license to build a petrochemical complex producing PX there. This was surprising given that "Chen's other plants in Xiamen had already been cited for repeated emissions infractions". In March 2007, Zhao Yufen, a chemistry professor at Xiamen University had collected 105 signatures by members of China's "top political advisory body" opposing the project and, in June, thousands of Xiamen residents protested, forcing local officials to drop the plan". After this "rare mass protest", the parent company Xianglu moved the project to Zhangzhou. The company initially intended to build in Dongshan County, "but large protests, in which some people were detained, prompted the site to be changed to Gulei.

In January 2009, the Chinese Ministry of Environmental Protection permitted construction of a petrochemical plant in Zhangzhou and Gulei, to produce p-xylene and a nearby Xianglu company factory to transform p-xylene into polyethylene terephthalate. By the end of 2009, there were 16 PX producers by 13 companies, nearly doubling capacity over the next years, with the petrochemical department at China International Engineering Consulting Corp predicting that China needed "to build at least 10 new PX facilities each with a capacity to produce 800,000 tons of the chemical a year over the next decade".

The plant was expected to begin production in mid 2012, but "was delayed by slower-than-expected construction and problems in gaining environmental clearance". Other sources reported that the Ministry of Environmental Protection opposed the project in October 2012, because no environmental assessment had been done, and fined it 200,000 yuan in January 2013 for starting construction prior to an approval. In May 2013, it had requested that the National Development and Reform Commission, in charge of economic planning, stop the project. Until the plant opened in 2013, China had imported 53% of its paraxylene. On July 30, 2013, before its start up, a "small blast" occurred at the Gulei plant, when its 3.2-million-tpy hydrocracker unit was tested and a hydrogen pipeline leaked. This incident delayed start-up by one week. No casualties or toxic leaks were reported at that time.

On April 3, 2015, one day after the news of a breakthrough in the Comprehensive agreement on the Iranian nuclear program, Reuters reported that Iran was to supply China more condensate under a new contract, specifically mentioning Dragon Aromatics.

=== 2015 fire ===
On 6 April 2015, a chemical fire at a pumping station for condensate storage in Zhangzhou caused an explosion and injured 6 people, before 430 fire fighters were reported to have put it out. The South China Morning Post wrote that an oil spill had caused the fire burning in three massive storage tanks, injured 14 people, six of them severely enough to go to hospital, four of them were firefighters. It reported that, on April 7, 350 police and more than 600 firefighters were at the scene, and that more than 400 soldiers were deployed, forcing evacuations of residents within a vicinity of 18 km. Officials had said that fires had been put out at 4:40pm, yet 3 hours later the fire restarted. BBC reported on 8 April 2015, citing Xinhua News Agency, that "foam sprayed by firefighters to cover the residue was becoming unstable due to the heat and was disintegrating, and was being shifted by strong winds". One of the tanks of about 1,500 tonnes of liquid hydrocarbon reignited and exploded. More than 14,000 residents were evacuated.

On April 8, the Los Angeles Times called the massive fire an "inferno", and that chemical defense corps members of the army fought amongst the firefighters. It quoted Wen Yunchao, who participated in the Xiamen protests, but has been staying the U.S., as saying "This is a sad situation for the residents in Zhangzhou". Ma Tianjie from Greenpeace East Asia said that there were no reports of leakage into groundwater, that the 16 PX plants had a production capacity of 10 million tons per year and that Dragon Aromatics was only 8% of China's PX production. Lin Boqiang, a US-trained energy economist at Xiamen University and director of the Energy Economics Research Center, said "that the amount of punishment that can be issued [for environmental protection enforcement] is ...too low".

On April 9, 2015 news spread that the fire had been put out. About 29,096 people had been evacuated per Xinhua, as some 10,500 people had moved to new homes by the end of 2014, but "more than 400 people were still living in the area", according to the director of the management committee of Gulei economic development zone.

Plastic News, an industry communication by Crain Communications, Inc. claimed, "The facility was not in production but rather at the end of a three week maintenance service project when the incident happened." Indeed, on 20 March 2015, another industry website, ICIS Pricing (Independent Chemical Information Service) by Reed Business Information had reported that "China's Dragon Aromatics has shut its paraxlyene (PX) facility in Zhangzhou earlier in the week for a scheduled maintenance."

Local news coverage of the incident by Dongnan Zaobao (Southeast Morning News) was censored, while "China Central Television carried footage of the fire, with flames shooting into the air, but provided few details".

According to the Fujian occupational safety agency, the fire was caused by "flaws in production procedures".

By April 7, 2015 the price of paraxylene and benzene in Asia had increased by 5%.

In the days after the fire, the ministry of environmental protection released draft regulation, allowing representatives of environmental organizations to "scrutinise" the ministry's performance and assisting public-interest groups in lawsuits they may file.

=== 2018 ===
As of 2018, the plant was reorganised and renamed Fuhaichuang, 90% owned by the Chinese government via Fuhua Gulei Petrochemical Co Ltd and 10% by Dragon Aromatics, Taiwan's Xianglu Group. After a 3-year shutdown, the repaired plant was to restart operations by June or July 2018 with a splitter enlarged to 110,000 bpd.

== See also ==
- polyester resin
