= List of Major National Historical and Cultural Sites in Fujian =

This list is of Major Sites Protected for their Historical and Cultural Value at the National Level in the Province of Fujian, People's Republic of China.

Site	Chinese name	Location	Designation	Image
Site of the Gutian Congress	Gutian huiyihuizhi 古田会议会址	Shanghang County 上杭县	1-18	Upload file
Anping Bridge	Anping qiao (Wuli qiao) 安平桥(五里桥)	24°42′36″N 118°26′38″E Jinjiang 晋江市	1-59	Upload file
Qingjing Mosque	Qingjing si 清净寺	24°54′20″N 118°35′13″E Quanzhou 泉州市	1-87	Upload file
Main Hall of Hualin Temple	Hualin si dadian 华林寺大殿	Fuzhou 福州市	2-19	Upload file
Kaiyuan Temple	Kaiyuan si 开元寺	Quanzhou 泉州市	2-20	Upload file
Grave of Koxinga	Zheng Chenggong mu 郑成功墓	Nan'an 南安市	2-60	Upload file
Grave of Lin Zexu	Lin Zexu mu 林则徐墓	Fuzhou 福州市	3-2	Upload file
Site of the Former Soviet Government in Changting	Changting geming jiuzhi 长汀革命旧址	Changting County 长汀县	3-29	Upload file
Grave of Tan Kah Kee	Chen Jiageng mu 陈嘉庚墓	Jimei District, Xiamen 厦门市	3-38	Upload file
Mulanbei Reservoir	Mulan bei 木兰陂	Putian 莆田市	3-56	Upload file
Chongwu Town Walls	Chongwu chengqiang 崇武城墙	Hui'an County 惠安县	3-61	Upload file
Luoyang Bridge	Luoyang qiao 洛阳桥	Quanzhou 泉州市	3-68	Upload file
Residence of Shangshudi in Taining	Taining Shangshudi jianzhuqun 泰宁尚书第建筑群	Taining County 泰宁县	3-86	Upload file
Quanzhou Heavenly Empress' Palace	Quanzhou Tianhou gong 泉州天后宫	Quanzhou 泉州市	3-133	Upload file
Shijiawen Buddhist Pagoda	Shijiawen Fo ta 释迦文佛塔	Putian 莆田市	3-149	Upload file
Qingyuan Rock Sculptures	Qingyuan Shan shizaoxiang 清源山石造像	Quanzhou 泉州市	3-169	Upload file
Jiurishan Rock Sculptures	Jiurishan moya shike 九日山摩崖石刻	Nan'an 南安市	3-176	Upload file
Dehua Porcelain Kiln Sites	Qudougong Dehua yao yizhi 屈斗宫德化窑遗址	Dehua County 德化县	3-229	Upload file
Muslim Cemetery, Quanzhou	Yisilanjiao shengmu 伊斯兰教圣墓	Quanzhou 泉州市	3-250	Upload file
Ruins of the Han City of Chengcun	Chengcun Hancheng yizhi 城村汉城遗址	Wuyishan City 武夷山市	4-38	Upload file
Sanqing Hall of Yuanmiao Temple	Yuanmiaoguan Sanqingdian 元妙观三清殿	Putian 莆田市	4-103	Upload file
Qing Ciji Gong, Baijiao Ciji Gong	Qing, Baijiao Ciji gong 青、白礁慈济宫	Xiamen 厦门市	4-104	Upload file
Guandi Temple on Dongshan Island	Dongshan Guan Di miao 东山关帝庙	Dongshan County 东山县	4-144	
Stone Paifang of Zhanghou	Zhangzhou shipaifang 漳州石牌坊	Zhangzhou 漳州市	4-145	Upload file
Fujian Tulou	Fujian tulou 福建土楼	24°34′28″N 116°59′40″E Yongding County, Nanjing County, and Hua'an County 华安县	4-172	Upload file
Ruiyan Maitreya Statue	Ruiyan Mile zaoxiang 瑞岩弥勒造像	Fuqing 福清市	4-196	Upload file
Cao'an Temple Stone Carvings	Cao'an shike 草庵石刻	Jinjiang 晋江市	4-198	Upload file
Majiang Fort, Grave of the Martyr, Zhaozhong Ancestral Hall	Majiang haizhan paotai, Lieshi mu ji Zhaozhong ci 马江海战炮台、烈士墓及昭忠祠	Fuzhou 福州市	4-203	Upload file
Hulishan Fort	Hulishan paotai 胡里山炮台	Xiamen 厦门市	4-204	Upload file
Wanshouyan Site	Wanshouyan yizhi 万寿岩遗址	Sanming 三明市	5-51	Upload file
Tanshishan Site	Tanshishan yizhi 昙石山遗址	Minhou County 闽侯县	5-52	Upload file
Jian Kiln Site	Jian yao yizhi 建窑遗址	Jianyang 建阳市	5-53	Upload file
Tianzhong Wanshou Pagoda	Tianzhong Wanshou ta 天中万寿塔	Xianyou County 仙游县	5-324	Upload file
Fort Anzhenbao	Anzhenbao 安贞堡	Yong'an 永安市	5-325	Upload file
Chen Taiwei Palace	Chen taiwei gong 陈太尉宫	Luoyuan County 罗源县	5-326	Upload file
Old Cai Family Residence	Caishi gu minju jianzhuqun 蔡氏古民居建筑群	Nan'an 南安市	5-327	Upload file
Quanzhou Confucian Temple	Quanzhou fu Wenmiao 泉州府文庙	Quanzhou 泉州市	5-328	Upload file
Great Hall of Baoshan Temple	Baoshan si dadian 宝山寺大殿	Shunchang County 顺昌县	5-329	Upload file
Chongmiao Baosheng Jianlao Pagoda	Chongmiao Baosheng Jianlao ta 崇妙保圣坚牢塔	Fuzhou 福州市	5-330	Upload file
Main Hall of Zhanghou Confucian Temple	Zhangzhou fu Wenmiao Dachengdian 漳州府文庙大成殿	Zhangzhou 漳州市	5-331	Upload file
Jiangdong Bridge	Jiangdong qiao 江东桥	Zhangzhou 漳州市	5-332	Upload file
Zhaojiabao and Yi'anbao	Zhaojiabao - Yi'anbao 赵家堡—诒安堡	Zhangpu County 漳浦县	5-333	Upload file
Gushan Rock Carvings	Gushan moya shike 鼓山摩崖石刻	Fuzhou 福州市	5-453	Upload file
Fujian Chuanzheng Shipyard Buildings	Fujian Chuanzheng zhujian 福建船政建筑	Fuzhou 福州市	5-491	Upload file
Sibao Book Trade Buildings	Sibao shufang jianzhu 四堡书坊建筑	Liancheng County 连城县	5-515	Upload file
Beiyuan Yubei Site	Beiyuan yubei yizhi 北苑御焙遗址	Jian'ou 建瓯市	6-95	Upload file
Cizao Kiln Site	Cizao yao zhi 磁灶窑址	Jinjiang 晋江市	6-96	Upload file
Dejimen Site	Dejimen yizhi 德济门遗址	Quanzhou 泉州市	6-97	Upload file
Nansheng Kiln Site	Nansheng yao zhi 南胜窑址	Pinghe County 平和县	6-98	Upload file
Wuyishan Rock Tombs	Wuyishan yamuqun 武夷山崖墓群	Wuyishan 武夷山市	6-253	Upload file
Grave of Zhu Xi	Zhu Xi mu 朱熹墓	Jianyang 建阳市	6-254	Upload file
Zenhai Dike	Zhenhai di 镇海堤	Putian 莆田市	6-578	Upload file
Mignshanshi Site	Mingshanshi 名山室	Yongtai County 永泰县	6-579	Upload file
Old Architecture in the Port of Quanzhou	Quanzhou gang gu jianzhu 泉州港古建筑	Quanzhou 泉州市	6-580	Upload file
Shengshou Pagoda	Shengshou baota 圣寿宝塔	Changle 长乐市	6-581	Upload file
Wuchen Pagoda	Wuchen ta 无尘塔	Xianyou County 仙游县	6-582	Upload file
Architecture of Sanfangqixiang and Zhuzifang	Sanfangqixiang he Zhuzifang jianzhuqun 三坊七巷和朱紫坊建筑群	Fuzhou 福州市	6-583	Upload file
Old Architecture of Peitiancun	Peitiancun gu jianzhuqun 培田村古建筑群	Liancheng County 连城县	6-584	Upload file
Nanshan Palace	Nanshan gong 南山宫	Hua'an County 华安县	6-585	Upload file
Xipo Tianhou Palace	Xipo Tianhou gong 西陂天后宫	Yongding County 永定县	6-586	Upload file
Shifeng Temple	Shifeng si 狮峰寺	Fu'an 福安市	6-587	Upload file
Lin Family Ancestral Shrine, Zhangzhou	Zhangzhou Linshi zong ci 漳州林氏宗祠	Zhangzhou 漳州市	6-588	Upload file
Main Hall of the Zhangpu Confucian Temple	Zhangpu Wenmiao Dacheng dian 漳浦文庙大成殿	Zhangpu County 漳浦县	6-589	Upload file
Main Hall of Baoyan Temple	Baoyan si dadian 宝严寺大殿	Shaowu 邵武市	6-590	Upload file
Ding Family Ancestral Shrine, Chendai	Chendai Dingshi zongci 陈埭丁氏宗祠	Jinjiang 晋江市	6-591	Upload file
Zhengshun Temple	Zhengshun miao 正顺庙	Sanming 三明市	6-592	Upload file
Covered Bridges of Pingnan County	Min dongbei langqiao 闽东北廊桥	Pingnan County 屏南县	6-593	Upload file
Anxi Confucian Temple	Anxi wenmiao 安溪文庙	Anxi County 安溪县	6-594	Upload file
Deyuan Hall	Deyuan tang 德远堂	Nanjing County 南靖县	6-595	Upload file
Shi Lang Residence, Ancestral Temple, Grave	Shi Lang zhai, ci he mu 施琅宅、祠和墓	Jinjiang 晋江市	6-596	Upload file
Mazu Temple	Mazu miao 妈祖庙	Putian 莆田市	6-597	Upload file
Lin Family Yizhuang	Linshi yizhuang 林氏义庄	Longhai 龙海市	6-598	Upload file
Fuzhou Confucian Temple	Fuzhou wenmiao 福州文庙	Fuzhou 福州市	6-599	Upload file
Dongyue Temple, Jian'ou	Jian'ou Dongyue miao 建瓯东岳庙	Jian'ou 建瓯市	6-600	Upload file
Statues of Qiyun Cave	Qiyun dong zaoxiang 栖云洞造像	Luoyuan County 罗源县	6-826	Upload file
Clay Sculptures of Xianying Palace	Xianying gong nisu 显应宫泥塑	Changle 长乐市	6-827	Upload file
Lingjigong Stone Stele	Lingji gong bei 灵济宫碑	Minhou County 闽侯县	6-828	Upload file
Grave of Chen Huacheng	Chen Huacheng mu 陈化成墓	Xiamen 厦门市	6-962	Upload file
Modern Architecture of Gulangyu	Gulangyu jindai jianzhuqun 鼓浪屿近代建筑群	Xiamen 厦门市	6-963	Upload file
Residence and Grave of Yan Fu	Yan Fu guju he mu 严复故居和墓	Fuzhou 福州市	6-964	Upload file
Site of Tianyi Post Office	Tianyi zongju jiuzhi 天一总局旧址	Longhai 龙海市	6-965	Upload file
Early Buildings of Jimei Village School and Xiamen University	Jimei xuecun he Xiamen daxue zaoqi jianzhu 集美学村和厦门大学早期建筑	Xiamen 厦门市	6-966	Upload file
Site of the Xiamen Prison Skirmish	Xiamen poyu douzheng jiuzhi 厦门破狱斗争旧址	Xiamen 厦门市	6-967	Upload file
Site of the First Front Army of the Red Army in Jianning	Jianning hong yi fangmianjun lingdao jiguan jiuzhi 建宁红一方面军领导机关旧址	Jianning County 建宁县	6-968	Upload file
Site of the Eastern Route Army of the Red Army of Workers and Peasants	Zhongguo Gong-Nong Hongjun donglu jun lingdao jiguan jiuzhi 中国工农红军东路军领导机关旧址	Zhangzhou 漳州市	6-969	Upload file

== See also ==
- Principles for the Conservation of Heritage Sites in China
