= Huang Daozhou =

- 黃道周
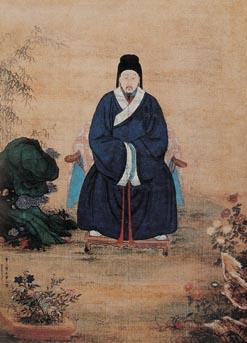
- Portrait of Huang Daozhou by Zeng Jing

Senior Grand Secretary
- In office 1645
- Monarch: Zhu Yousong
- Preceded by: Ma Shiying
- Succeeded by: Lu Zhenfei

Personal details
- Born: 1585; Tongshan (modern Dongshan), Zhangpu, Fujian, Ming dynasty
- Died: 1646 (aged 61)

Huang Daozhou (Chinese: 黃道周; Pe̍h-ōe-jī: N̂g Tō-chiu, 1585–1646) was a Chinese calligrapher, military general, and politician of the Ming dynasty and short-life Southern Ming.

Huang obtained the degree of Jinshi in 1622. He subsequently held various government positions, including Minister for Education. He was known for providing candid advice to the emperors. This made him very unpopular with the Chongzhen Emperor. As a result, Huang was demoted and sent to prison.

In his later years, he volunteered to fight against the Manchurian invasion. He was captured and, refusing to surrender, was killed by the Manchurian army.
