= Dongshan Island Campaign =

1953 battle between PRC and ROC

Coordinates: 23.699453°N 117.420397°E

- Part of the Chinese Civil War
Date	16–18 July 1953 (2 days)
Location	Dongshan Island
Result	People's Republic of China victory

Belligerents
Republic of China (Taiwan)	People's Republic of China

Commanders and leaders
Hu Lien	Ye Fei; You Meiyao

Strength
8,000+ infantry; 2,000 paratroopers	1,200 militiamen; 100–200 marines; 9,000+ infantry (reinforcements)

Casualties and losses
2,664+ killed; 715 captured; 2 tanks destroyed; 3 landing ships sunk; 2 aircraft lost; Several wounded	1,250+ killed

The Dongshan Island Campaign (traditional Chinese: 東山島戰役; simplified Chinese: 东山岛战役; pinyin: Dōngshān Dǎo Zhànyì) was a battle fought on Dongshan Island, Fujian between the Nationalists and the Communists during the Chinese Civil War when the Nationalists unsuccessfully attempted to retake the island from the Communists. The campaign was the last and largest battle between the two sides after the Nationalists retreated to Taiwan. After this battle the Republic of China stopped launching large scale offensive operations against Communist China. Instead, the Nationalist strikes against mainland China were reduced to limited infiltration and skirmishes.

== Order of battle ==
- Attackers: Republic of China Army (ROC Army)
  - One army division, one regiment
  - Civilian based guerrillas with junk boats.
  - One paratroop regiment (487-498 men)
  - 13 naval vessels
  - 30+ motorized junks
- Defenders: People's Liberation Army (PLA)
  - The 80th Public Security Regiment and militia (1,200 men)
  - The 272nd Regiment of the 31st Army
  - A regiment of the 28th Army
  - A regiment of the 41st Army
  - The 91st Division of the 31st Army

== Prelude ==
Shortly before dawn on 16 July 1953, the Nationalist commander Hu Lien (胡琏) sailed with his troops in 13 naval vessels and more than 30 motorized junks toward Dongshan Island, Fujian, attempting to retake the island from the Communists who took the island from the Nationalists three years earlier in the Battle of Dongshan Island. In addition to one regular army division and a regiment, a paratroop battalion totaling 498 personnel was deployed for the mission. The total Nationalist force committed was under 10,000. The Nationalists had hoped to turn the island into a stronghold near the enemy and use it as a steppingstone to launch strikes against the mainland, but many military commanders were doubtful this would ever succeed. After fierce debate, a compromise was reached: a much more moderate objective of striking the island to gain a political and morale boost and then a quick withdrawal before the enemy could reinforce the island. Later, when the situation permitted, the original plan to turn the island into a stronghold would be implemented.

The Communist local defense, consisting of the 80th Public Security Regiment and militia totaling 1,200 men, was obviously outnumbered, so the Communist commander Ye Fei instructed the local garrison commander You Meiyao (游梅耀) to decide what was best, giving him the option of withdrawing if necessary and counterattacking later.

You Meiyao, a staff officer of Chen Yi during the Second Sino-Japanese War, decided to fight it out, making future attempts to dislodge the Nationalists very difficult. You Meiyao suggested that while reinforcements were organized as quickly as possible, the local garrison would use the terrain and strong fortifications on the island to slow the enemy down by inflicting as many casualties as possible. Once the attackers were exhausted, the defenders would counterattack with reinforcements.

== First stage ==
The first shot of the campaign was fired at 5:00 AM on July 16, 1953, when a Nationalist division landed on the island. After three hours of fierce fighting, the Communists' first line of defense was breached, and the Nationalists had succeeded in forcing them into their second line of defense. By the end of the day, the Nationalists had successfully taken the largest port on the island and controlled most of the island. However, the Communist resistance in the few remaining isolated pockets proved to be much stronger than anticipated.

Communist mortar fire badly damaged the port facilities including the pier and also scored direct hits on three large landing ships. Although the mortar rounds themselves were not powerful enough to completely destroy the landing ships which carried heavy weaponry and ammunition, the secondary explosions triggered by the direct hits by the PLA heavy mortars were enough to sink all three landing ships. Since the motorized junks with shallow draft were not severely affected by the wreckage, the Nationalists were still able to transport personnel onto the island via these junks, but ships carrying heavy weaponry were effectively blocked due to greater draft. The Nationalists, however, did not consider the problem to be serious because the defenders were mostly light infantry anyway, a mistake that they would later deeply regret. In addition to failing to realize the problem caused, the Nationalists were not able to take the highest point of the island from the Communists and although most of the PLA heavy mortars were knocked out with air support, the surviving ones did not stop shelling the Nationalists until the last round of ammunition had been exhausted.

The other Communist stronghold left on the island was in the region of Eight Feet Gate (Ba Chi Men, 八尺门), which faced the mainland, defended by a single company of Communist naval infantry. The strongly fortified position included a pier and thus was the critical steppingstone for Communist reinforcement from the mainland. The Nationalists had correctly identified this serious threat and had also correctly decided to eliminate this threat early on, so the entire American trained paratroop division which reached the island first was devoted to the mission. However, the lightly armed paratroopers proved to be no match for the enemy in heavily fortified positions on the terrain that strongly favored the defenders. Despite repeated assaults, the elite paratroopers not only failed to achieve their original objective but suffered heavy losses, with several hundred killed and wounded. The lack of heavy weaponry was the main cause of the Nationalist failure to take this very important position, which paved the way for the eventual Nationalist defeat in the campaign. Unable to take either of the two remaining Communist strongholds on the island, the Nationalist advance halted.

== Second stage ==
Communist units on the mainland reacted rapidly by mobilizing all available vehicles to transport troops to the front. The Communist 272nd Regiment of the 31st Army at Zhangpu County was first to respond: by 5:50 AM, less than an hour after the first shot of the campaign was fired, the advance guard of the regiment was already on its way to the front in the few military vehicles available, while the rest of the regiment commandeered every civilian vehicle on the road. By 9:00 AM, the entire regiment had reached the Eight Feet Gate (Ba Chi Men, 八尺门) pier of the Eastern Mountain (Dongshan, 东山) Island. With the help of the newly arrived reinforcements, the Communist naval infantry company at Eight Feet Gate managed to force the attacking Nationalist paratroopers into retreat. Two regiments of the Communist 28th Army and 41st Army arrived soon afterward. The Communist commander You Meiyao, building on his initial success in repelling the attacking Nationalist paratroopers, successfully counterattacked before the Nationalists had time to regroup. As the Nationalists were forced back by the counterattack, the Communist 91st Division of the 31st Army landed on the island under the commander of the 31st Army, Zhou Zhijian (周志坚).

The Nationalist commander of the operation, Hu Lien, initially did not believe that the Communists could reinforce the island on such a large scale and in such short time, since the vital Nine Dragons Bridge (Jiulong Jiang Daqiao, 九龙江大桥) was thought to have bombed by the Nationalist air force. Realizing that the bridge was passable his troops was now outnumbered and outgunned, Hu Lien chose to withdraw before any more enemy reinforcements arrived. The campaign ended on July 18, 1953, after the island was secured by the defenders with some Nationalist soldiers accidentally left on the island. They surrendered.

== Outcome ==
The Dongshan Island Campaign was the last large scale Nationalist counterattack against the mainland. Nationalist dead recovered by the Communists on land and in the coastal waters totalled 2,664, and another 715 were captured, while the number of wounded was uncertain because most of them were successfully evacuated by the Nationalists themselves. In addition, two tanks were destroyed, three landing ships sunk and two aircraft were also lost.

The poor Nationalist inter-service communication caused by the excessive secrecy also resulted in the Nationalist landing ships unloading in the largest port on the island, which was within range of the PLA heavy mortar positions. The slow landing ships loaded with heavy weaponry became sitting ducks as they were being unloaded, and in addition to three being damaged the pier was also badly damaged by the Communist mortar fire.

Another serious blunder committed by the attacking Nationalist force was the failure to completely cut the communications link between the defenders and the mainland. As a result, the defenders were able to maintain communications with the mainland and the Communist commanders were much more aware of the situation than their Nationalist counterparts.

The attacking Nationalist forces underestimated the speed and of the Communist response. Although the Nationalist order of battle included more than 1 division, and the paratrooper division comprised two brigades totalling only 498 men, a battalion size. Lack of heavy equipment prevent taking over stationed soldiers in the bunkers, Lack of heavy weapon contributed much paratroops losses. Furthermore, due to the sinking of three landing ships at the port and the destruction of the port by enemy heavy mortar fire, most landing forces became light infantry without firepower superior to that of their opponents. This problem was further compounded by the incorrect use of the lightly equipped paratroopers by ordering them to attack the strongly fortified Communist positions at Eight Feet Gate Pier, resulting in heavy casualties. After losing their superiority in firepower with the destruction of their heavy weapons at the port, the Nationalists lost their superiority in numbers as the Communists reinforced their garrison from the mainland.

In addition to underestimating how quickly the Communists would send reinforcements, the Nationalists also underestimated how quickly the Communists would repair the damaged bridge. Nationalist intelligence estimated it would take at least two days, but in reality, the Communists had the bridge repaired in only hours. When the news reached the surprised Nationalists, they chose to withdraw quickly from the island.

== See also ==
- Outline of the Chinese Civil War
- Project National Glory
- National Revolutionary Army
- History of the People's Liberation Army
- Chinese Civil War
