= Sui'an =

Sui'an 绥安镇
- Town
- Location in Fujian Sui'an (China)
- Coordinates: 24°07′04″N 117°37′00″E
- Country: People's Republic of China
- Province: Fujian
- Prefecture-level city: Zhangzhou
- County: Zhangpu

Area
  - Total: 118.8 km^{2} (45.9 sq mi)
- Elevation: 11 m (36 ft)

Population (2020)
  - Total: 177,438
  - Density: 1,494/km^{2} (3,868/sq mi)
- Time zone: UTC+8 (China Standard)
- Postal code: 363200
- Area code: 0596

Sui'an (simplified Chinese: 绥安; traditional Chinese: 綏安; pinyin: Suí'ān; Pe̍h-ōe-jī: Sui-an) is a town in and the county seat of Zhangpu County, in far southern Fujian province, China. It is the seat of Zhangpu's government, Lower People's Court and local branches of CPC and PSB.

== Transportation ==
Zhangpu Railway Station on the Xiamen–Shenzhen Railway is a few kilometers to the west of town.

The county town is reached by China National Highway 324, and by the provincial-govt-maintained road coming down from the Pinghe county-town to Jiuzhen harbour.
