= Gulei =

Gulei 古雷镇
- Town
- Location in Fujian Gulei (China)
- Coordinates: 23°50′05″N 117°37′15″E
- Country: People's Republic of China
- Province: Fujian
- Prefecture-level city: Zhangzhou
- County: Zhangpu
- Time zone: UTC+8 (China Standard)
- Postal code: 363200
- Area code: 0596

Gulei (Chinese: 古雷; pinyin: Gǔléi; Pe̍h-ōe-jī: Kó͘-lûi; lit. 'old thunder') is a town in Zhangpu County in the far south of Fujian province, China. It lies on a long peninsula, also called Gulei, which projects into the Taiwan Strait, enclosing the Zhang River estuary / Dongshan Bay to its east. The town is the furthest south of any in Zhangpu, one of its villages (called Gulei) being only 5 kilometres (3.1 mi) from the main island of Dongshan.

By 2017, Gulei town and the entire Gulei peninsula have been cleared of population for the construction of the Tenglong Chemical Complex.

== Gulei in the News ==
On January 9, 2009, China's Environmental Protection Ministry authorized the construction in Gulei of a two-plant chemical project: a Tenglong (腾龙)(DAC - Dragon Aromatics Co.) company factory to produce p-Xylene, and a Xianglu (翔鹭) company factory to use p-xylene to produce polyethylene terephthalate.

Tenglong is partly owned and Xianglu wholly owned by Chen Youhao. Both companies have factories in Xiamen's Haicang District. Residents' protests there in June 2007 forced the two-plant project to cease construction and move elsewhere. The delay and the move, together with a new 830 million to meet pollution control guidelines, have apparently added RMB 3 billion to the cost of the investment, which in 2007 was stated to be 10.8 billion.

In 2008 thousands of people in Gulei town and in neighbouring Dongshan county protested the coming construction. Zhangzhou municipal authorities insisted they had exaggerated the impact of the chemical project and did not understand the economic benefits it could bring.

In January 2012, precommissioning operation of the two plants began.

In April 2015, one of the plants suffered an explosion and fires caused by an oil leak; after two days, the fires were extinguished.

== Notes and references ==
- South China Morning Post, Environmental Chiefs Approve .., by Shi Jiangtao and Kristine Kwok, 2009 Jan 14.
