= Qingjing Mosque =

Mosque in Quanzhou, Fujian, China

- 清净寺
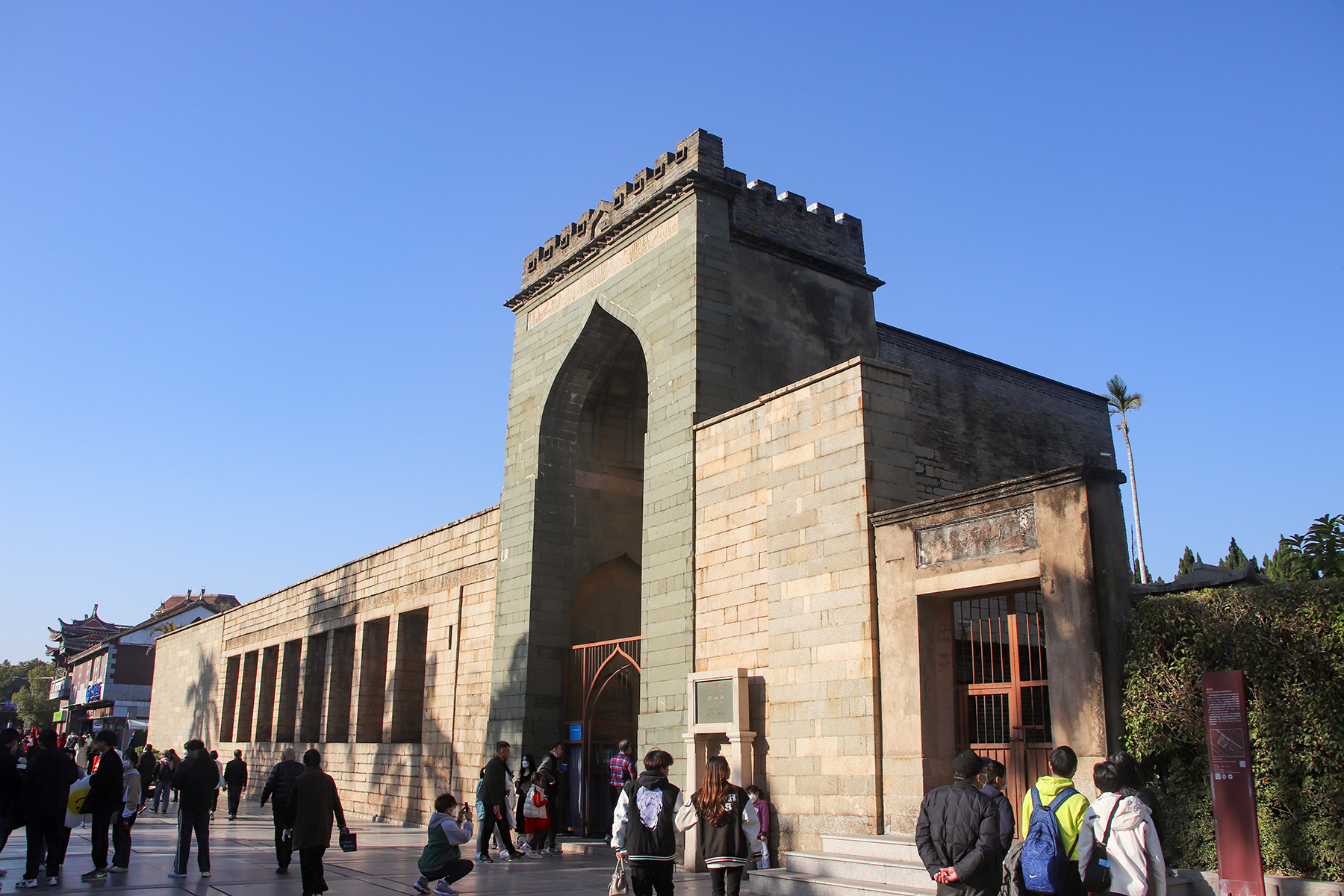
- The iwan and sahn of the Qingjing Mosque

- Location of the mosque in Fujian

Religion
- Affiliation: Sunni Islam
- Status: Active

Location
- Location: Tumen Street, Quanzhou, Fujian
- Country: China
- Coordinates: 24°54′10″N 118°35′27″E

Architecture
- Type: Mosque
- Style: Islamic
- Completed: 1009 CE

Specifications
- Capacity: 300 worshipers
- Dome: 1
- Minaret: 2 (small)

UNESCO World Heritage Site
- Part of: Quanzhou: Emporium of the World in Song-Yuan China
- Criteria: Cultural: (iv)
- Reference: 1561
- Inscription: 2021 (44th Session)

Major cultural heritage sites under national-level protection
- Official name: Qingjing Mosque 清净寺
- Type: Cultural
- Criteria: Religion
- Designated: 3 April 1961
- Reference no.: 1-87

The Qingjing Mosque (Chinese: 清净寺; Arabic: مسجد الأصحاب, romanized: Masjid al-Aṣḥāb), also known as the Ashab Mosque or Shengyousi Mosque, is a mosque located on Tumen Street, in the city of Quanzhou, Fujian, China. Qingjing Mosque is a UNESCO World Heritage Site. The mosque's Arabic name, Masjid al-Aṣḥāb (“Mosque of the Companions”), and its Chinese name, Shengyousi, are dedicated to the Prophet Muhammad's companions, which in Chinese Muslim Tradition, traveled to Quanzhou and were buried in the nearby city of Qingyuan.

The Mosque of the Ashan has been known by several names throughout its history. The original and historically authentic name of the mosque is the Mosque of the Alashab, as explicitly attested by its Arabic foundation inscription, which remains preserved at the site. Through a critical examination of the historical and epigraphic evidence, Hamada Hagras demonstrated that the designation Qingjing should not be regarded as the mosque’s original name. Rather, Qingjing referred to a different mosque that was once located near the southern gate of the city. Following the destruction of that mosque, the foundation inscription bearing the name Shenjingsi was transferred to the Mosque of the Alashab. Over time, this transfer led to the gradual association of the name Qingjing with the Mosque of the Companions, eventually becoming its commonly used designation. Nevertheless, the Arabic foundation inscription confirms that the mosque’s original historical name is the Mosque of the Alashab. During the Song and Yuan periods, the mosque served as a central gathering space for the local Muslim population to worship and socialize. The mosque served an important role linking the local Muslim community to outside networks, often attracting merchants and scholars from across the Indian Ocean. Qingjing Mosque is among the oldest mosques in China and the only example of a stone entryway to a mosque in mainland China. It is an example of cultural contact between Chinese Minnan style and Islamic style architecture. The mosque is also listed as a Chinese major cultural heritage site.

== History ==
Due to its strategic positioning between the Fujian province and the Jin River, Quanzhou became an international trading center of Song Dynasty China, specializing in Maritime trade. Quanzhou likely had the largest foreign population of any city during Song-era China. Islam arrived in Quanzhou as the result of this maritime trade during the Tang dynasty, with Arab and Persian merchants establishing settlements along the southeastern coast of China.

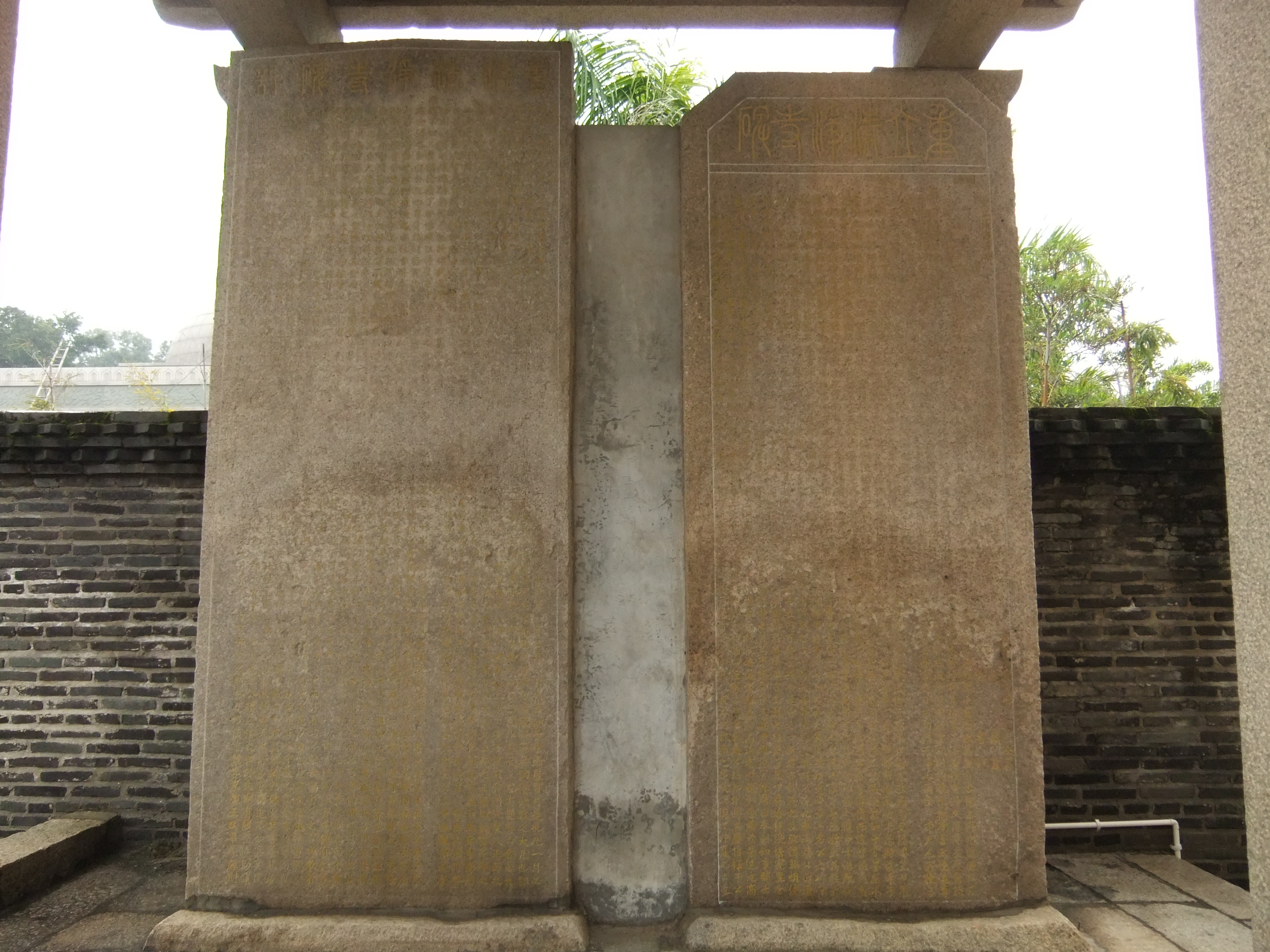
Tablets describing the history of the mosque during the Yuan and Ming dynasties.

Constructed in 1009 or 1010 CE, the 2,500-square-metre (27,000 sq ft) Islamic style mosque is one of the oldest mosques in China, considered by some to be the second oldest surviving.

Following Mongol conquest of China into the establishment of the Yuan dynasty, Quanzhou continued to function as a major center of international trade. Merchants from Arabia, Persia, and Southeast Asia continued to travel to the city, as the mosque was a popular congregation space, and acted as a meeting point for foreign traders. Inscriptions dating to this period recount a renovation project, funded by Ihamed B. Muhammed Gudeish of Shiraz, after the mosque sustained damages from natural disasters in 1310. East from the gate are two stone tablets that relay information regarding reconstructions of the mosque during the Yuan and Ming dynasties.

During the Ming dynasty, restrictions on maritime trade led to the gradual decline of the foreign merchant population in Quanzhou, though the Qingjing mosque still persisted as a place of worship. Imperial records from the Yongle Emperor (Zhu Di) indicate the provision of protections for the mosque and local Muslim communities. Later, repairs and additions to the mosque were made during the Ming and Qing dynasties, which brought about new boundary walls and modifications to the Mingshan Hall. In 1761, the roof of Fengtian Temple was destroyed in a typhoon. The primary prayer hall was then moved to the Mingshan Hall.

== Architecture ==
The Qingjing Mosque is an example of cultural contact between Muslim and Chinese groups, exhibiting features of both Arabic and Chinese Minnan (also known as Hokkien) architectural styles. What remains of the mosque is the entryway attached to the southeast corner of the original prayer hall, with the Mingshan prayer hall on the northwest corner.

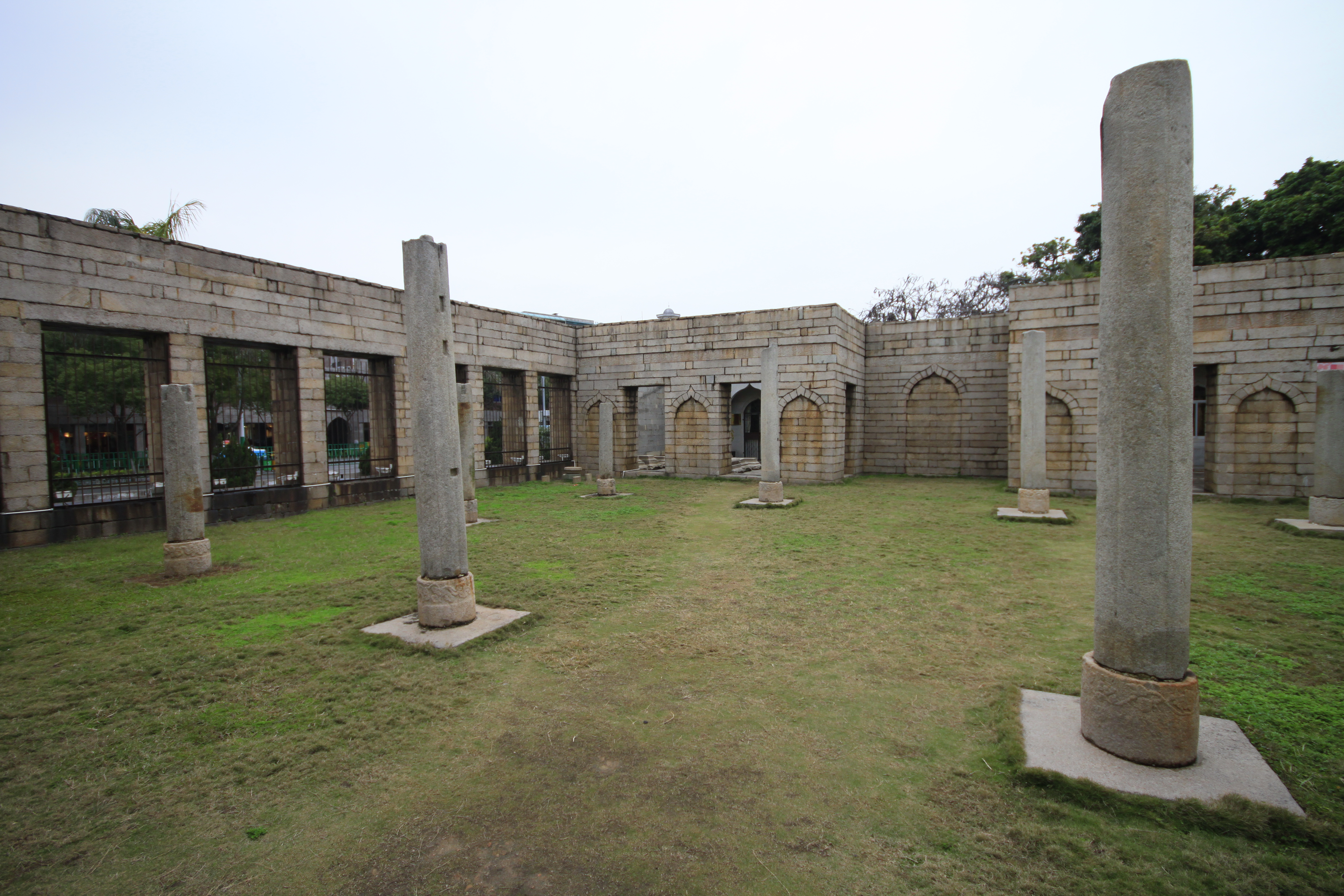
Interior of Fengtian Hall, the original prayer area of Qingjing Mosque.

The entrance to the mosque is the only example of stone entrances in mainland China, and is composed of diabase and white granite. Due to the southward orientation and axisymmetrical construction of the entryway, the gate tower aligns with traditional Chinese architectural practices, especially those of religious spaces. The passageway into the mosque consists of three interconnected vaults and arches, less than 5 meters in diameter each. While it resembles an Iranian-style Iwan, its lower back wall is open for access to the original prayer hall. Lotus relief decoration within the dome in the entryway represents respect for sanctity and purity. References of Caisson Chinese style architecture suggest strong influence from the Southern Fujian Province. The top of the entryway is covered with crenellations, surrounding a platform atop the tower used for lunar observation to determine the beginning of Ramadan.

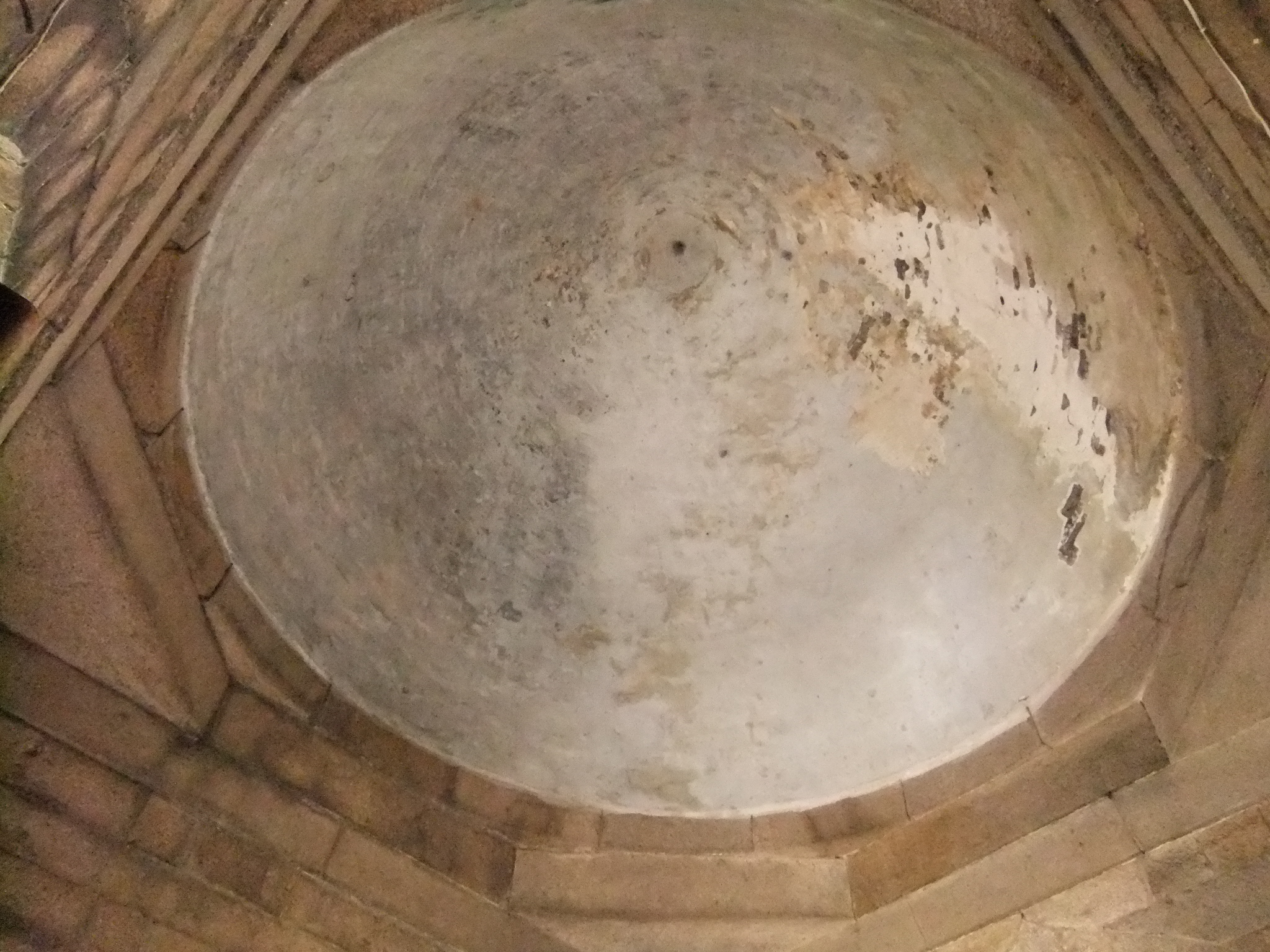
Dome interior

The Fengtian Hall, which was the original prayer hall, and the mosque overall, have a layout that resembles Abbasid-era hypostyle mosques like the Great Mosque of Samarra or the Great Mosque in Kairouan. At thirty by twenty-seven meters, Fengtian Hall once had a roof supported by three rows of four stone columns. Facing the street, a granite wall with eight large windows provides a view from the hall to outside the mosque, though the mosque may have extended into what is now the street during the eleventh through fourteenth centuries. The east wall has remnants of an indentation, providing evidence of a mihrab. There are blind six mihrab on both sides of the main mihrab inscribed with Qura’nic verses. The street-facing wall and pishtaq archways around the mosque are features that are unique to this mosque. There is an inscription band on the facade decorates with Surah Al-Insan. lSituated on the northwest corner of the mosque, Mingshan Prayer Hall contains features commonly seen in Southern Fujian (Minnan) architectural styles, as the structure shadows a central courtyard with open doors to the north, south, and east to improve ventilation and temperature. The use of red brick and raw soil in the outer walls assist with thermal insulation and moisture-proofing.

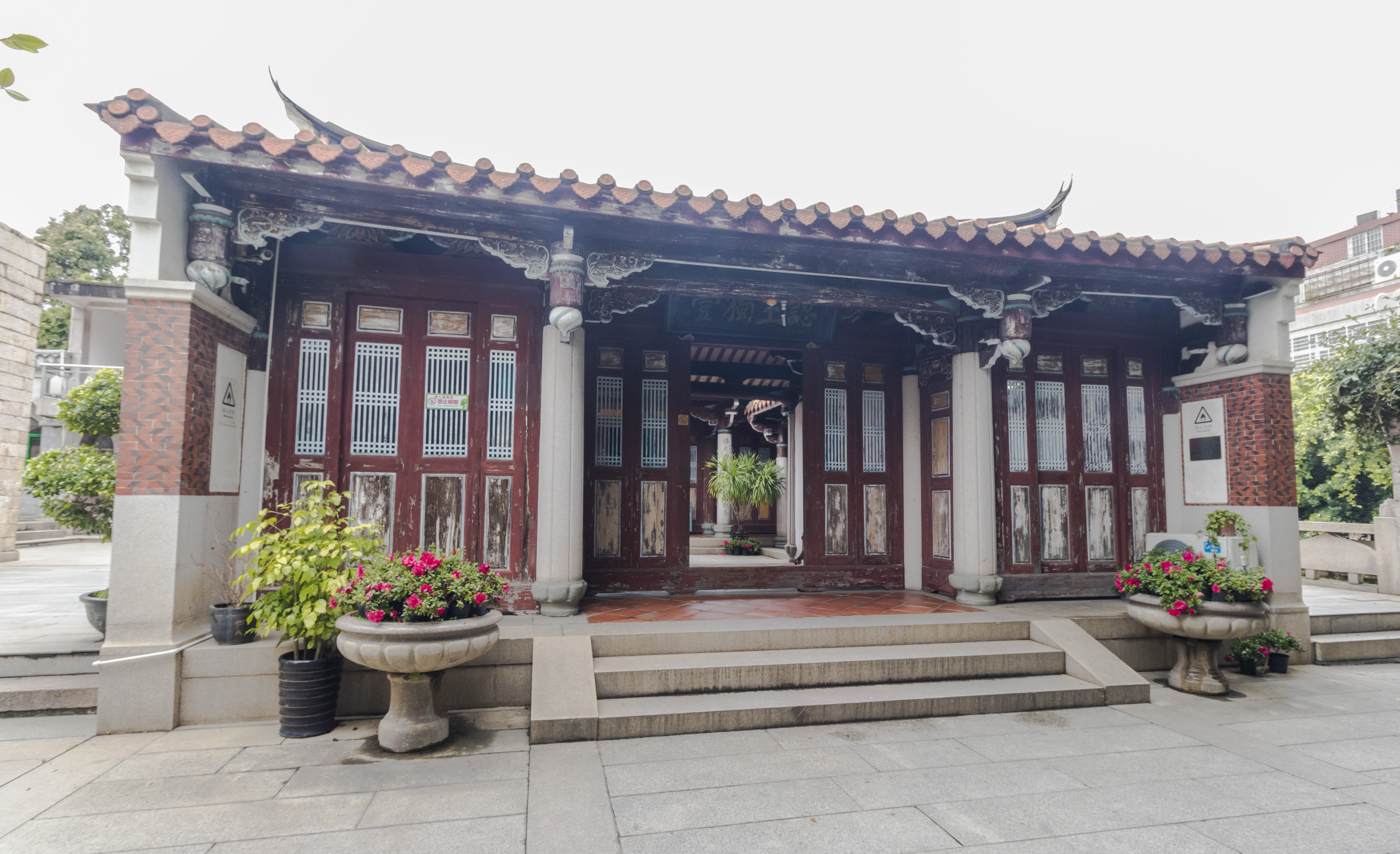
Mingshan prayer hall, located on the Northwest corner of the mosque.

== Archeology and UNESCO Designation ==
In the 1950s, local construction projects near Quanzhou resulted in the uncovering of dozens of tombstones and grave monuments. Several of these artifacts were stored in the Qingjing Mosque before their relocation to the Quanzhou Maritime Museum. During the late 1980s, excavations uncovered pottery dated to the Song period, along with traces of Yuan period wooden construction. The Qingjing Mosque was designated a UNESCO World Heritage Site alongside Quanzhou at large in 2021.

== See also ==
Qingjing Mosque
- Traditional Chinese: 清淨寺
- Simplified Chinese: 清净寺
- Literal meaning: Tranquil Mosque
Transcriptions
Standard Mandarin
- Hanyu Pinyin: Qīngjìng Sì
Southern Min
- Hokkien POJ: Chheng-chēng-sī

- Islam in China
- List of mosques in China
- List of World Heritage Sites in China
- List of Major National Historical and Cultural Sites in Fujian
