= Xibu =

Town in Fujian Province, China

Coordinates: 23.6968°N 117.4339°E

Xibu (simplified Chinese: 西埔镇; traditional Chinese: 西埔鎮; pinyin: Xibù; Pe̍h-ōe-jī: Sai-po͘) is the chief town of Dongshan County, in Zhangzhou, Fujian, China. It is the county seat of the Dongshan County Government, Lower People's Court and local branches of the CPC and PSB.

By convention, Xibu is often referred to as Dongshan.
