= Zhangpu Confucian Temple =

Confucian temple in Fujian, China

- 漳浦文庙
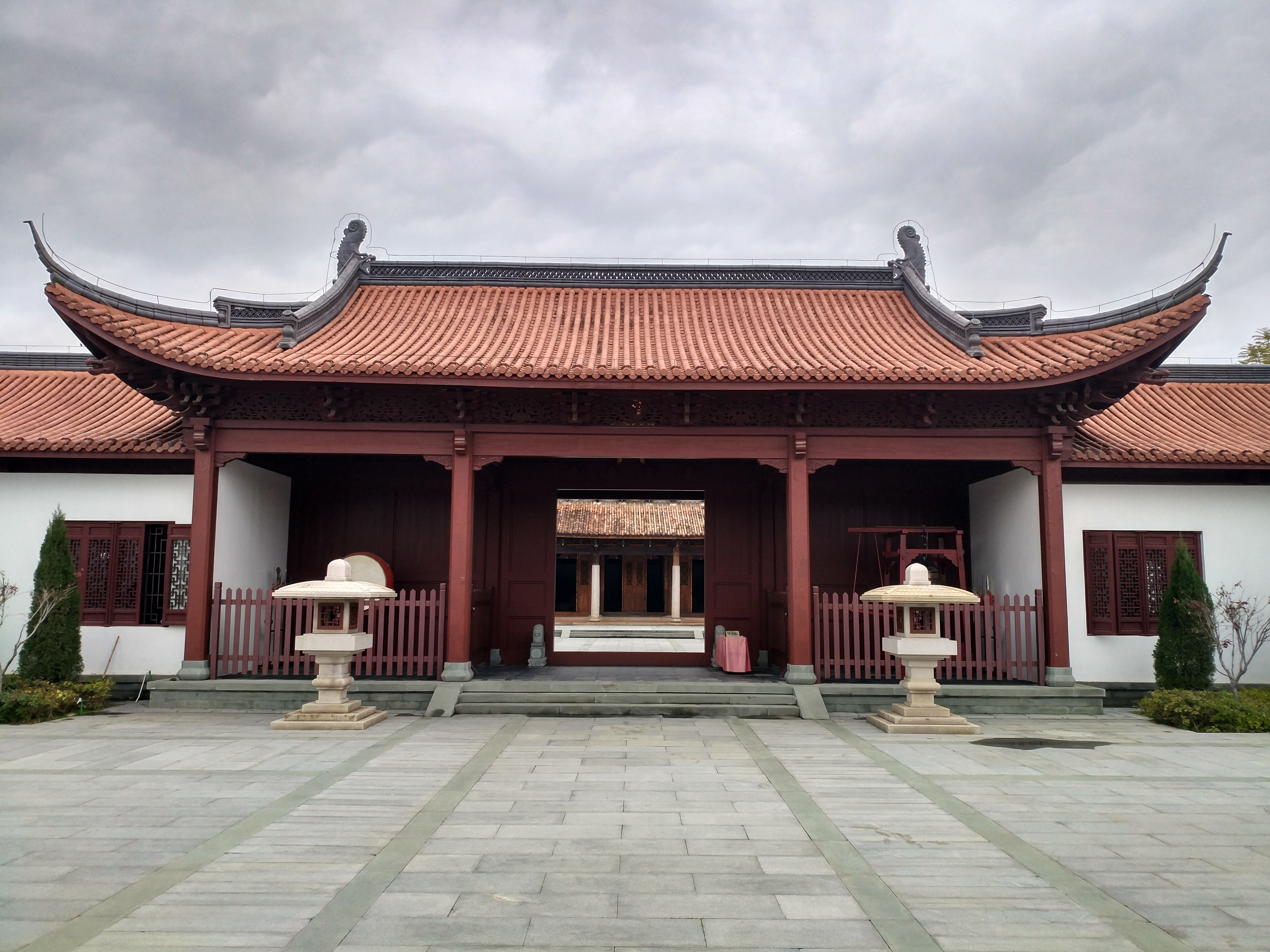
- Dacheng Gate of Zhangpu Confucian Temple.

- Location within Fujian

Religion
- Affiliation: Confucianism

Location
- Location: Zhangpu County, Fujian
- Country: China
- Interactive map of Zhangpu Confucian Temple
- Coordinates: 24°06′54″N 117°37′40.08″E

Architecture
- Style: Chinese architecture
- Established: 1070
- Completed: 1369 (reconstruction)

Zhangpu Confucian Temple (simplified Chinese: 漳浦文庙; traditional Chinese: 漳浦文廟; pinyin: Zhāngpǔ Wénmiào) is a Confucian temple located in Zhangpu County, Fujian, China.

== History ==
Zhangpu Confucian Temple was first built in 1070 during the reign of Emperor Shenzong of the Song dynasty (960–1279), and went through many changes and repairs through the following dynasties. Now the existing Dacheng Hall was built in 1369 at the dawn of the Ming dynasty (1368–1644).

In 2006, it was listed among the sixth batch of "Major National Historical and Cultural Sites in Fujian" by the State Council of China.

== Architecture ==
The Dacheng Hall faces the south. The hall in it has double-eave gable and hip roofs covered with yellow glazed tiles, which symbolize a high level in architecture. It is 5 rooms wide, 5 rooms deep and covers an area of 4,900 square metres (53,000 sq ft).
