= Battle of Dongshan Island =

1950 battle

- Part of the Chinese Civil War
Date	11 May 1950
Location	Dongshan Island
Result	People's Republic of China victory
Territorial changes	People's Republic of China captures Dongshan Island

Belligerents
Republic of China (Taiwan)	People's Republic of China

Commanders and leaders
Hu Lien	You Meiyao

Strength
Nationalist Claim : approximately 3,240; Communist Claim : 5,000	14,000

Casualties and losses
Nationalist Claim : approximately 815 losses; Communist Claim : 2,044	Minor

The Battle of Dongshan Island (simplified Chinese: 东山岛战斗; traditional Chinese: 東山島戰鬥; pinyin: Dōngshān dǎo zhàndòu) took place between the Nationalists and the Communists over the control of the Eastern Mountain (Dongshan, 东山/東山) Island at the southern tip of Fujian, China. It resulted in the Communists taking the island from the nationalists.

Order of battle:

- Defenders, nationalist order of battle:
  - The 17th Army
- Attackers, communist order of battle:
  - The 91st Division of the 31st Army
  - The 94th Division of the 32nd Army

After the Zhangzhou-Xiamen Campaign, more than 5,000 soldiers of the Nationalist 17th Army retreated to Eastern Mountain (Dongshan, 东山) Island off Fujian. Since the Nationalists were using the island as a stepping-stone to launch raids against the mainland, the 91st Division of the 31st Army and the 94th Division of the 32nd Army of the People's Liberation Army launched an assault to take the island on 11 May 1950 with the help of three artillery battalions. After 10 hours of fighting, the Nationalists retreated from the island, having suffered some 2,044 fatalities.

The Communist victory was a result of lessons learned in previous battles with the Nationalist troops for control over coastal islands, including the Battle of Kuningtou, the Battle of Denbu Island, and the Battle of Nan'ao Island, each of which illustrated the necessity for massing absolute numerical and technical superiority. As a result, the attackers outnumbered the defenders nearly three to one.

While a strategic loss for the Nationalists, the abandonment of the Eastern Mountain (Dongshan, 东山/東山) Island did teach valuable lessons. Primarily it resulted in less overstretch and better handling of defence on islands closer to Taiwan proper. The Nationalists also learned from the mistakes used in their defence and battle, as shown three years later during the Dongshan Island Campaign, when they attacked and seized islands they'd previously abandoned.

== See also ==
- Outline of the Chinese Civil War
- Outline of the military history of the People's Republic of China
- National Revolutionary Army
- History of the People's Liberation Army
- Chinese Civil War
