= Fuzhou Confucian Temple =

Confucian temple in Fuzhou, Fujian, China

- 福州文庙
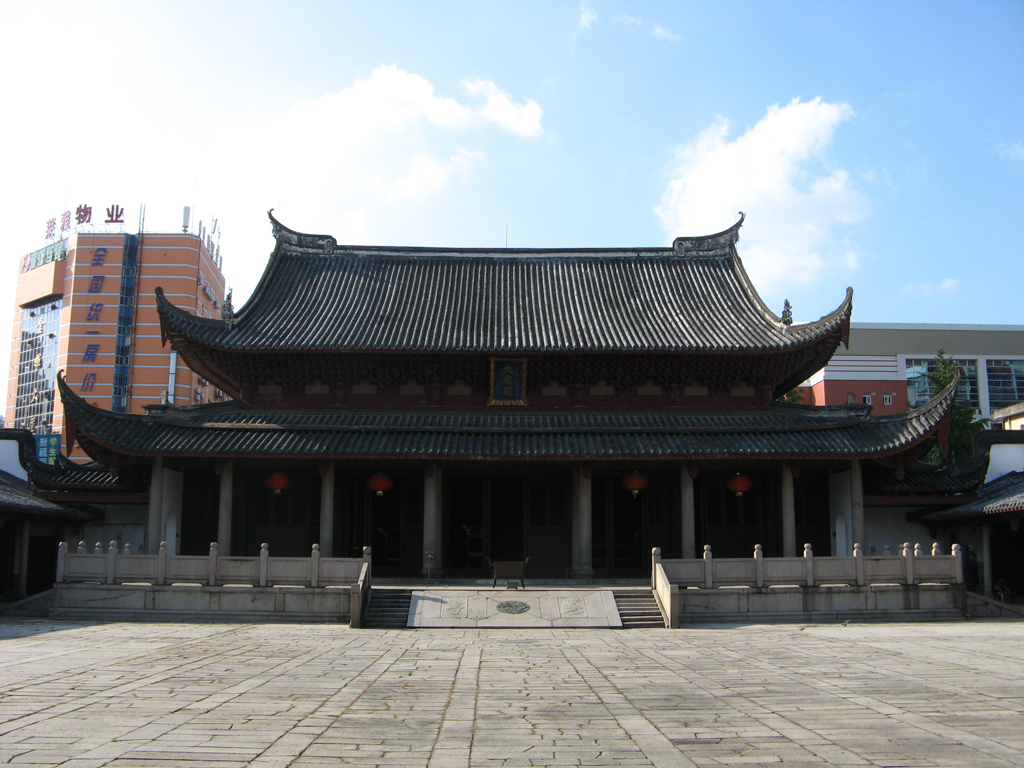
- The Dacheng Hall at Fuzhou Confucian Temple.

- Location within Fujian

Religion
- Affiliation: Confucianism

Location
- Location: Fuzhou, Fujian
- Country: China
- Coordinates: 26°4′51.6″N 119°17′49.9″E

Architecture
- Style: Chinese architecture
- Established: 773
- Completed: 1851 (reconstruction)

Fuzhou Confucian Temple
- Traditional Chinese: 福州文廟
- Simplified Chinese: 福州文庙
Transcriptions
Standard Mandarin
- Hanyu Pinyin: Fúzhōu Wénmiào

Xianshi Temple
- Traditional Chinese: 先師廟
- Simplified Chinese: 先师庙
Transcriptions
Standard Mandarin
- Hanyu Pinyin: Xiānshī Miào

Temple of Saints
- Traditional Chinese: 聖人殿
- Simplified Chinese: 圣人殿
Transcriptions
Standard Mandarin
- Hanyu Pinyin: Shèngrén Diàn

The Fuzhou Confucian Temple (Chinese: 福州文庙), more commonly known as Xianshi Temple (先師廟) or Temple of Saints (聖人殿), is a Confucian temple located in Fuzhou, Fujian.

== History ==
The temple was originally built in 773 by Li Yi (李椅), an official in the Tang Empire (618–907). The present version was completed in 1851 in the reign of Xianfeng Emperor of the Qing dynasty (1644–1911). In April 1941, Fuzhou was occupied by the Imperial Japanese Army, the temple was used as a warehouse for parking cars and storing gasoline.

After the founding of the Communist State, it was used successively as a school, shopping mall and children's palace. In September 1961, it has been designated as a municipal level cultural heritage by the Fuzhou Municipal Government. On September 2, 1996, it was classified as a provincial level cultural heritage by the Fujian Provincial Government. On May 25, 2006, it was listed among the sixth group of "Major National Historical and Cultural Sites in Fujian" by the State Council of China.

== Architecture ==
The temple covers a building area of 4,000 square metres (43,000 sq ft) and the total area including temple lands, forests and mountains is over 7,552 square metres (81,290 sq ft). Now the existing main buildings include the Gate, Pond (泮池), Dacheng Hall (大成殿), and Zhaobi (照壁). The Dacheng Hall in it has double-eave gable and hip roofs covered with yellow glazed tiles, which symbolize a high level in architecture. It is 7 rooms wide and 4 rooms deep. The stone statue of Confucius is enshrined in the center with Mencius and Zengzi lining up on both sides. Inside the hall, plaques written by Qing emperors Kangxi, Yongzheng, Qianlong, Jiajing and Daoguang are hung on the architrave.
