= Shentu, Fujian =

Coordinates: 24.07°N 117.80°E

Shentu 深土镇
- Subdistrict

Chinese transcription(s)
  - Chinese: 深土镇
  - Pinyin: Shēntǔ Zhèn
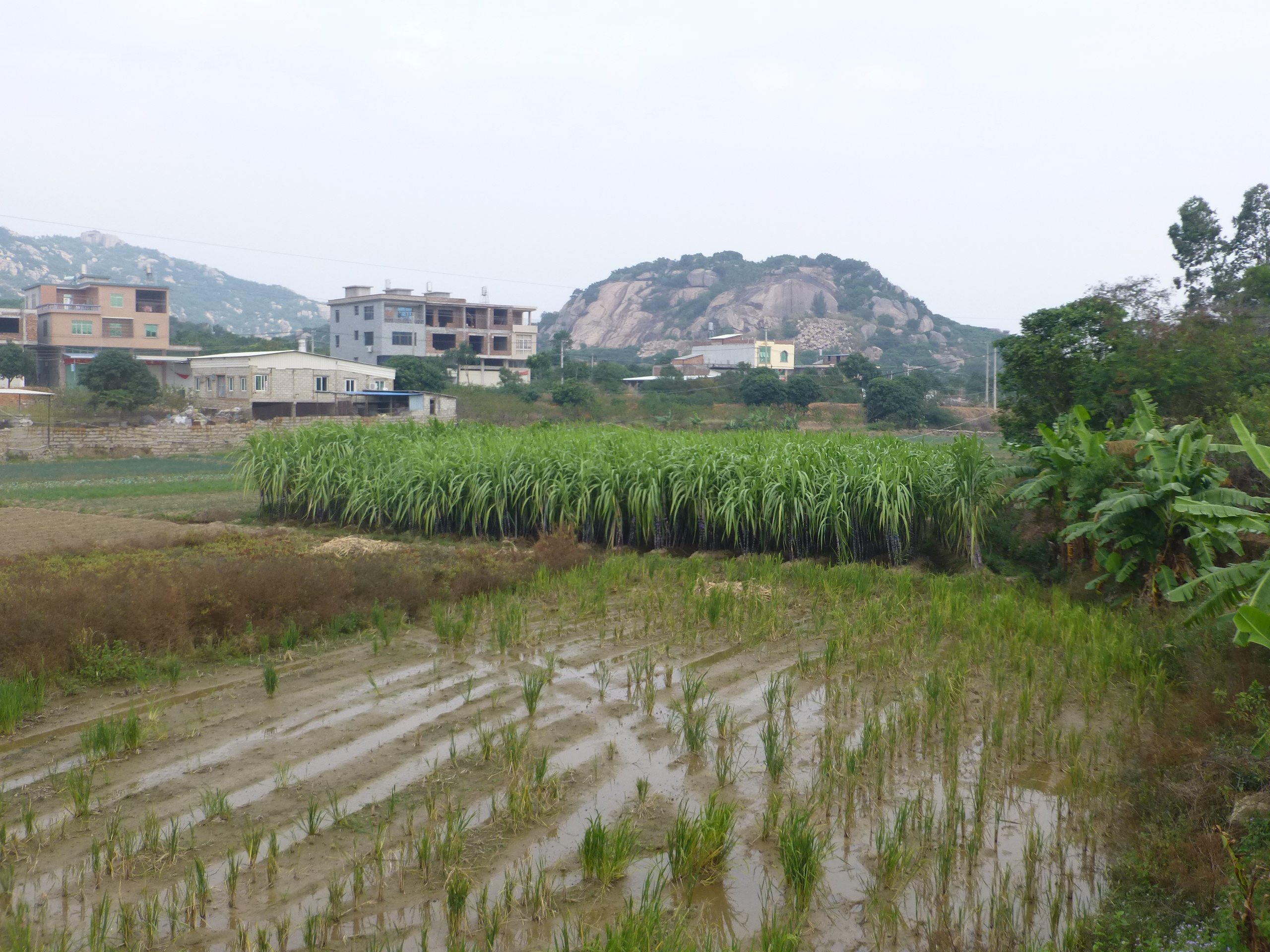
- A rural landscape in Shentu Town
- Interactive map of Shentu
- Country: China
- Province: Fujian
- Prefecture-level city: Zhangzhou
- County: Zhangpu County
- Time zone: UTC+8 (China Standard Time)

Shentu (Chinese: 深土) is a township-level division situated in Zhangzhou, Fujian, China and is a part of Zhangpu County.

Shentu is located in Zhangpu's lowland, near Fujian's sea coast. It is mostly agricultural. As of 2023, it has nineteen villages under its administration:

- Shentu Village
- Dunbing Village (墩柄村)
- Daxiao Village (大肖村)
- Dongwu Village (东吴村)
- Nanjing Village (南境村)
- Jinyuan Village (近院村)
- Tangtou Village (塘头村)
- Daitou Village (埭头村)
- Dadian Village (大店村)
- Tadi Village (塔底村)
- Jindong Village (锦东村)
- Shibu Village (示埔村)
- Che'ao Village (车鳌村)
- Shanbian Village (山边村)
- Shanwei Village (山尾村)
- Anxiawu Village (庵下吴村)
- Dong'an Village (东庵村)
- Daicuo Village (埭厝村)
- Dongping Village (东平村)

== See also ==
- List of township-level divisions of Fujian
