= Lin Hejie =

Chinese painter (born 1986)

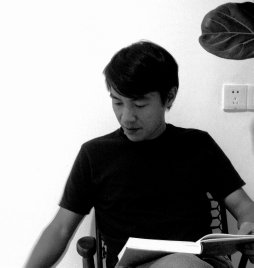
- Born: 7 October 1986 (age 39); Zhangpu County, Fujian, China
- Occupation: Painter

Lin Hejie
- Traditional Chinese: 林賀傑
- Simplified Chinese: 林贺杰
Transcriptions
Standard Mandarin
- Wade–Giles: Lin Ho-chieh

Lin Hejie (Lim Ho Kiat; Chinese: 林贺杰; pinyin: Lín Hèjié; pen name 林寉傑; born 7 October 1986) is a Chinese painter.

In February 2019, he was hired by the Fujian Provincial Government Portal to become an online commentator.

== Early life ==
Lin Hejie came from a poor family, and in middle school his talent for art was discovered by his art teacher. His art teacher supported Lin Hejie's artistic development, but due to Lin failing in his other academic examinations, he gave up his dream of attending university. Due to his family's economic circumstances, Lin left school.

In 2003, he joined the People's Liberation Army airborne troops. After working with the airborne troops, he insisted on researching art theory.

== Artistic career ==
Lin is a member of the Xiamen City Artists Association, the Fujian Province Artists Association. Since retiring from the airborne force in 2006, he has been a freelance artist in Xiamen.

His paintings are often related with his life experiences. Lin researched both Bada Shanren (a late-Ming and early-Qing dynasty Chinese painter) and the Lingnan School school painting, reading on the subject and observing ancient paintings.

Lin's works often appear in China's comprehensive art exhibition. His works have appeared in Beijing's Military Museum of the Chinese People's Revolution, Hong Kong City Hall, Yinchuan's International Convention and Exhibition Center, Xiamen's Museum of Xiamen City, Xiamen Art Gallery, and Weihai's Weihai City Public Art Center.

=== Artistic creation ===
Lin is known for painting, including ink painting, pottery and other forms. He also uses hybrid ceramic art and Western painting techniques.

=== Gallery ===
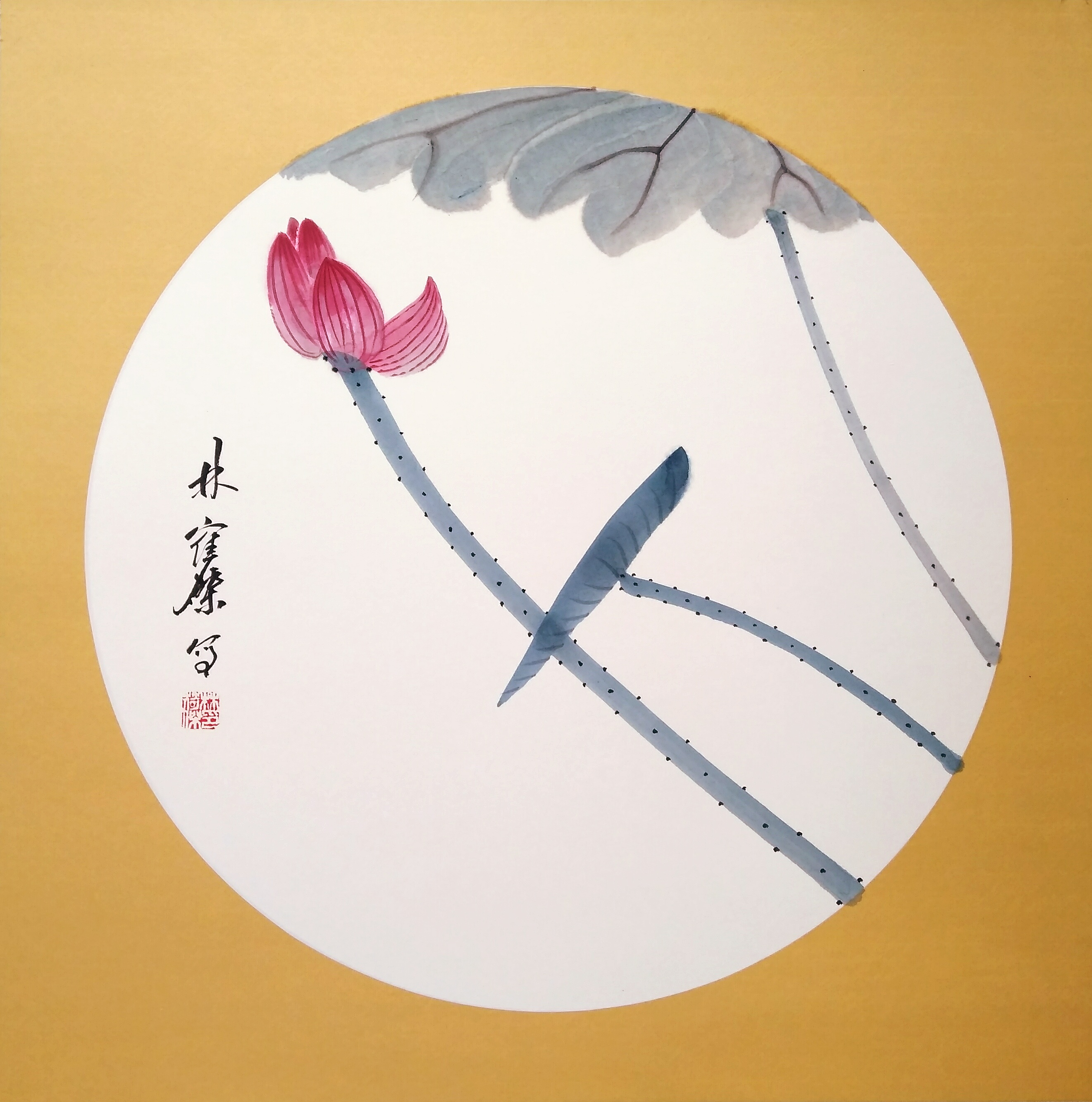
Lin Hejie's paintings

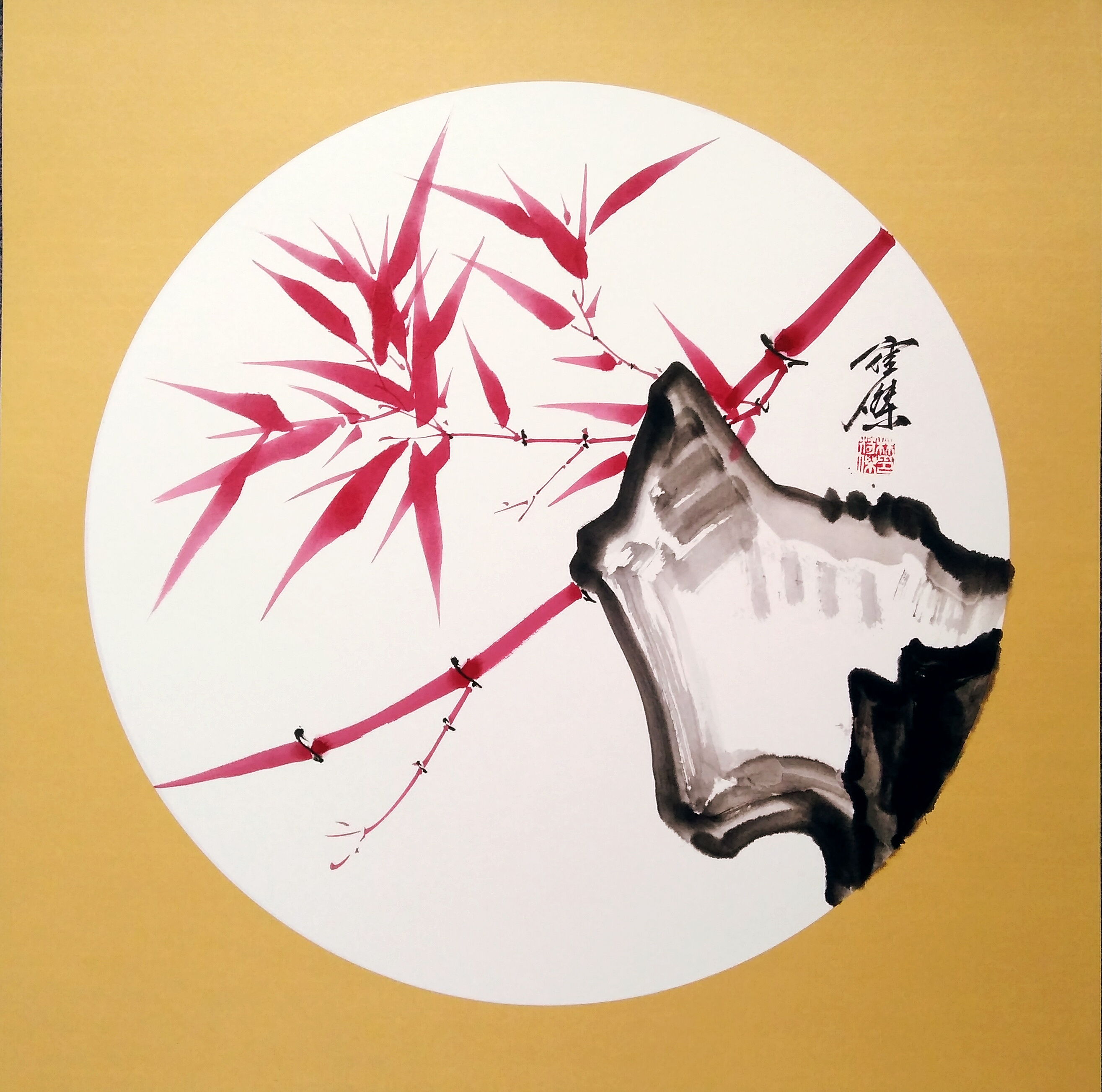
Lin Hejie's paintings

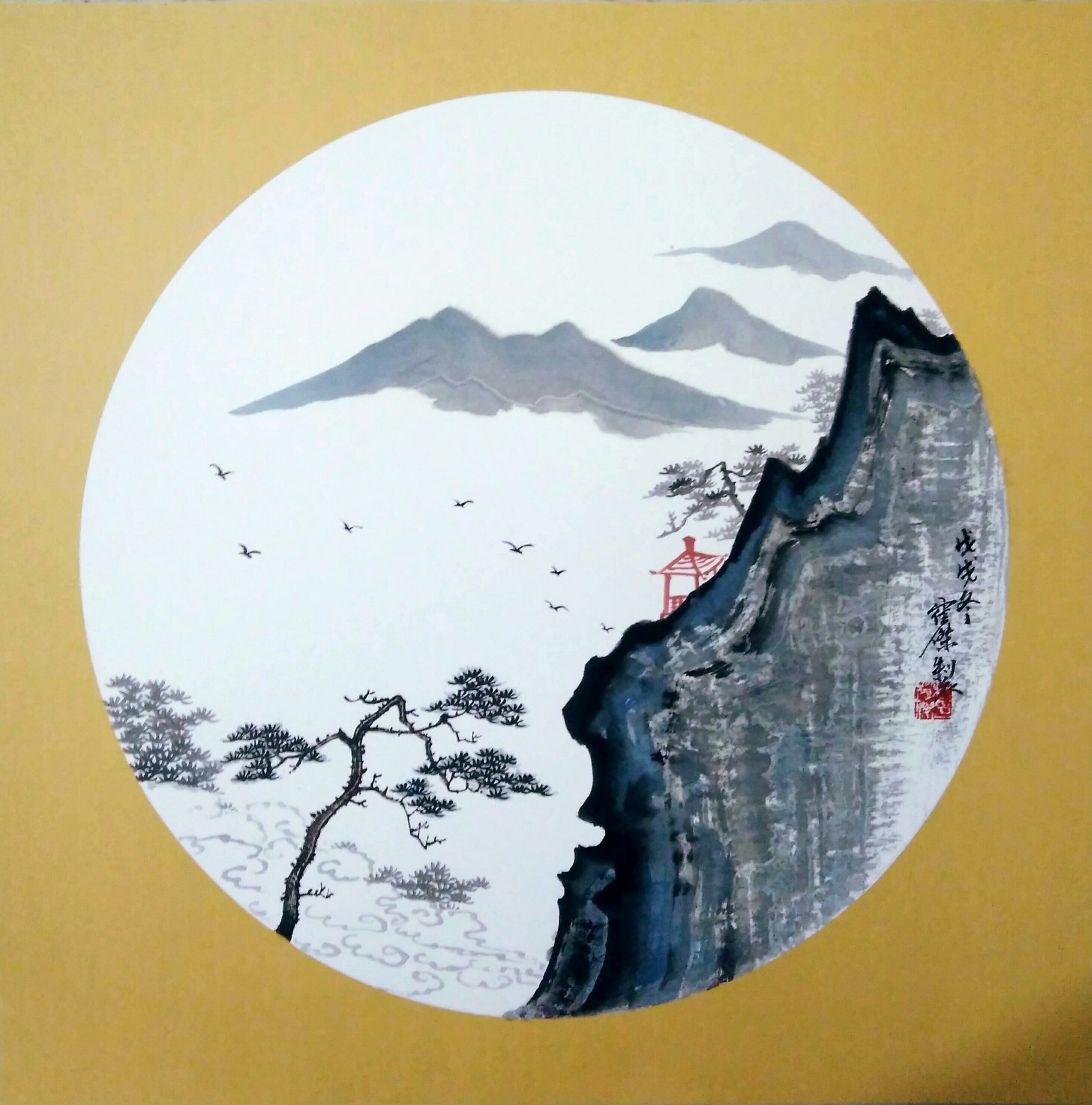
Lin Hejie's paintings

== See also ==
- List of Chinese painters
