= Zhangpu railway station =

Railway station in Fujian, China

Zhangpu 漳浦
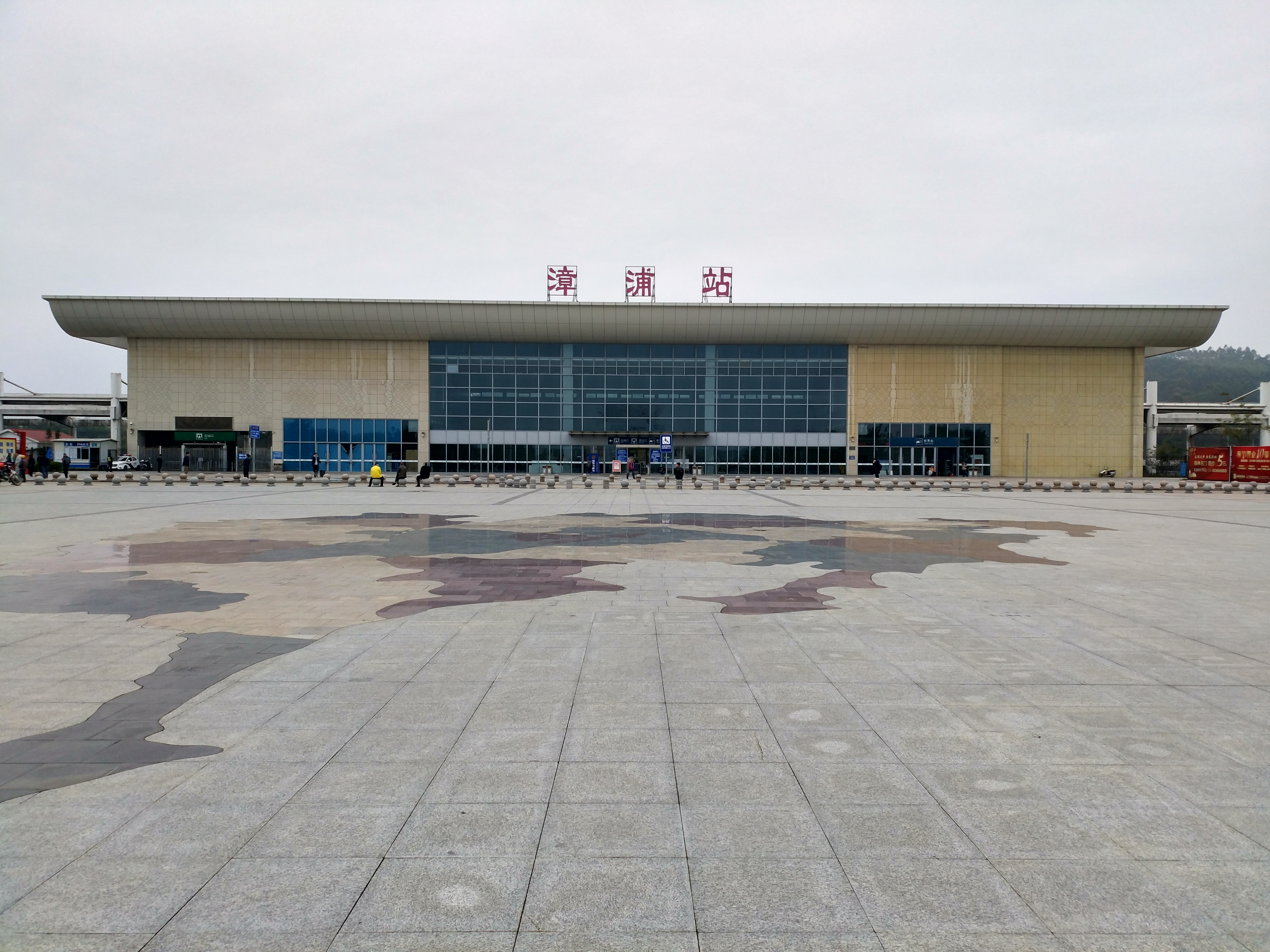

General information
- Location: Zhangzhou, Fujian; China
- Coordinates: 24.099183°N 117.558008°E
- Operated by: Nanchang Railway Bureau, China Railway Corporation
- Line(s): Xiamen–Shenzhen railway

Zhangpu railway station (Chinese: 漳浦站) is a railway station on the Xiamen–Shenzhen railway located in Zhangpu County, Fujian Province, China.

Preceding station	China Railway High-speed	Following station
Zhangzhou towards Xiamen North	Xiamen–Shenzhen railway	Yunxiao towards Shenzhen North
