= Zhangpu County =

Zhangpu County 漳浦县 Changpu
- County
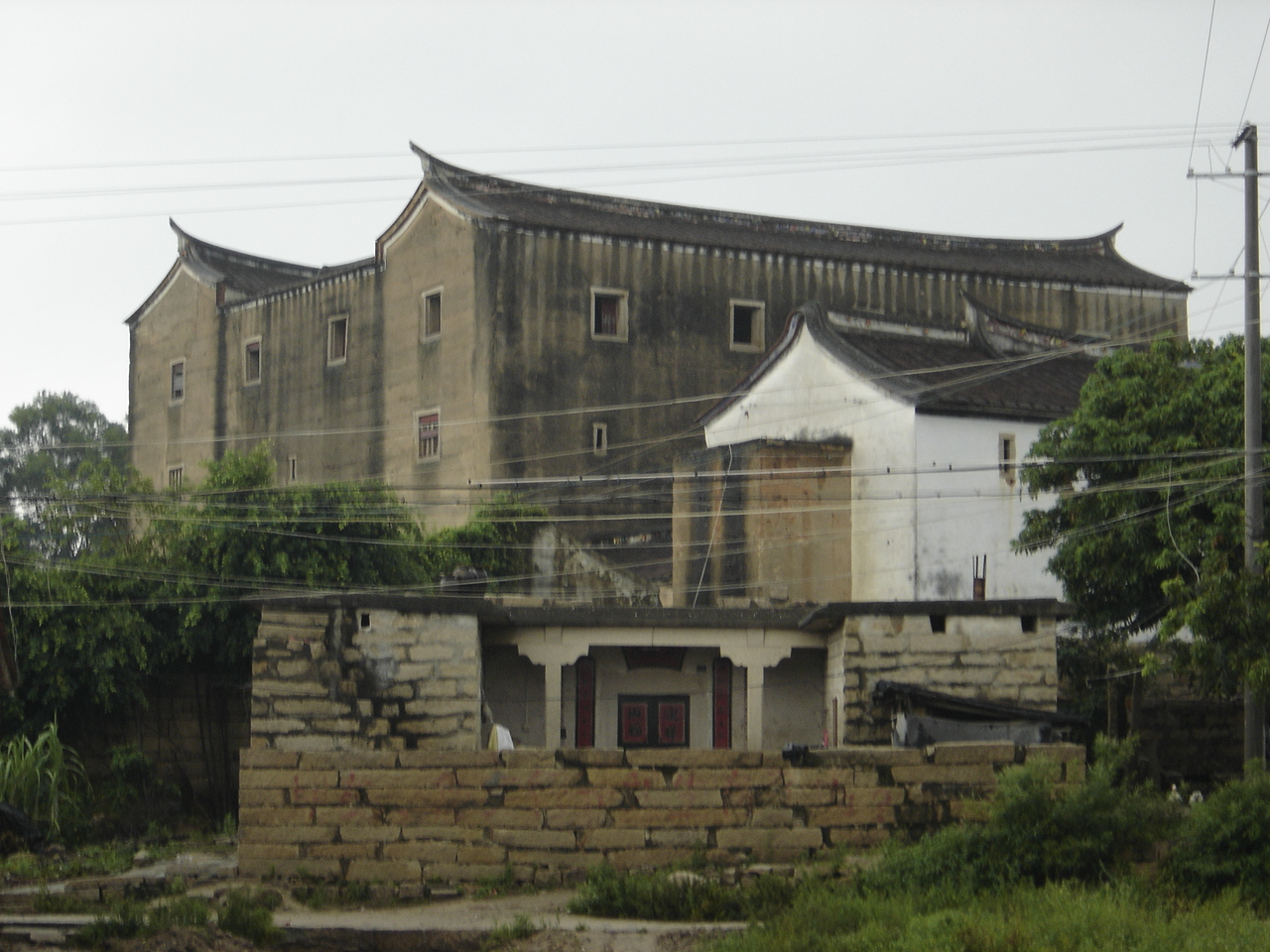
- Zhaojiabao ("Zhao family castle"), a fortified family residence in Huxi She Township

- Location of the seat in Fujian
- Coordinates: 24°07′01″N 117°36′50″E
- Country: People's Republic of China
- Province: Fujian
- Prefecture-level city: Zhangzhou

Area
  - County: 900.0 km^{2} (347.5 sq mi)

Population (2020)
  - County: 847,535
  - Density: 941.7/km^{2} (2,439/sq mi)
  - Urban: 466,953
- Time zone: UTC+8 (China Standard)

Zhangpu County (Chinese: 漳浦; pinyin: Zhāngpǔ; Tâi-lô: Tsiunn-phóo; Zhangpu dialect: Tsiunn-phóu [t͡siũ⁵⁵⁻³³ pʰɔu⁵³]) is a county of Zhangzhou prefecture-level city in far southern Fujian province, People's Republic of China with a population of 847,535 (2020 census). The county seat is located in the town of Sui'an (绥安镇).

Zhangpu is bordered by the Longhai City in the north, the counties of Pinghe and Yunxiao in the west, and the Taiwan Strait in the south and east.

== Administration ==
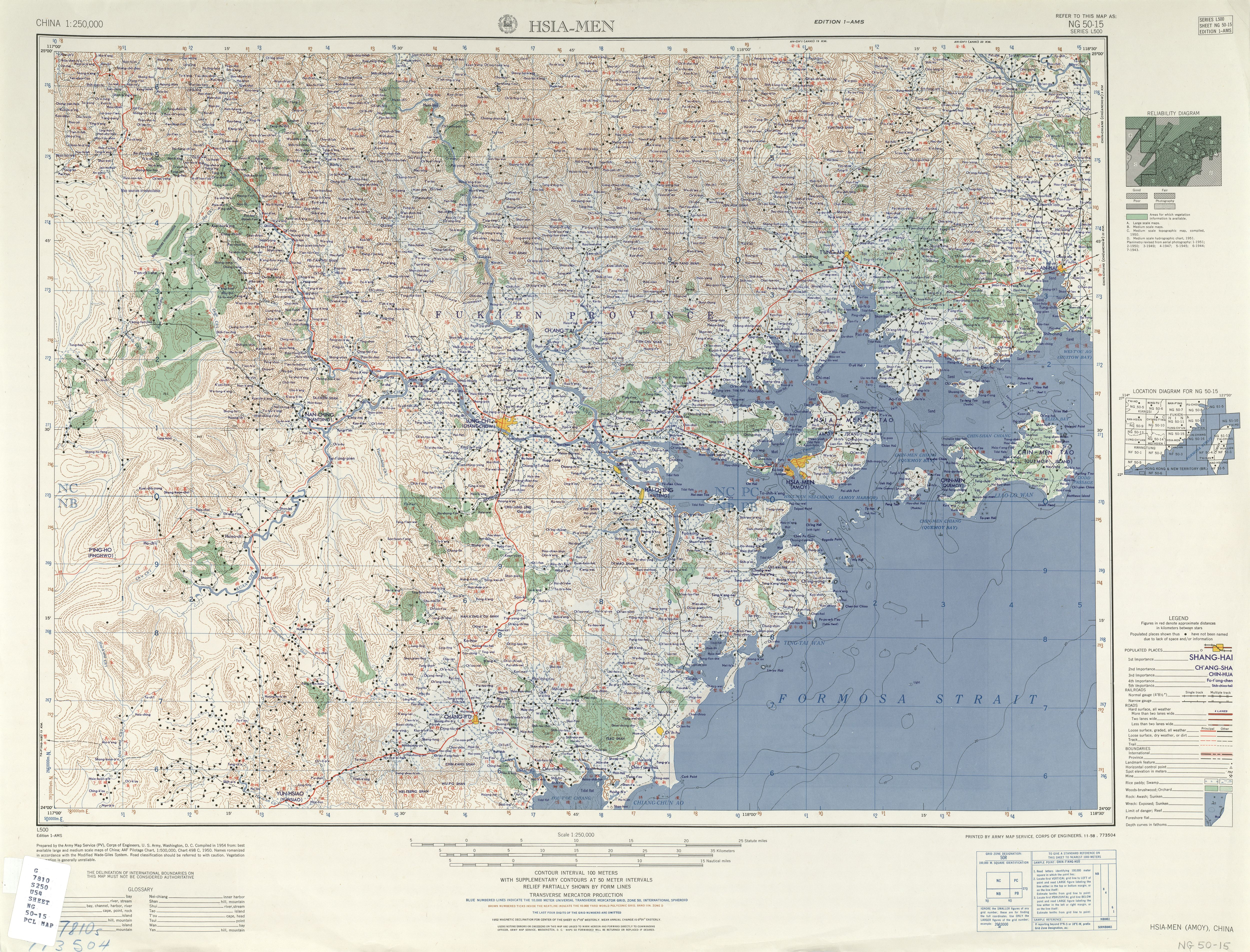
Map including Zhangpu (labeled as CHANG-P'U 漳浦) (1954)

Besides Sui'an, Zhangpu oversees 16 other towns (镇):

1. Fotan (佛昙)
2. Chihu (赤湖)
3. Jiuzhen (旧镇)
4. Duxun (杜浔)
5. Xuemei (霞美)
6. Gongfu (官浔)
7. Changqiao (长桥)
8. Qianting (前亭)
9. Shentu (深土)
10. Pantuo (盘陀)
11. Maping (马坪)
12. Shiliu (石榴)
13. Shaxi (沙西)
14. Da'nanban (大南坂)
15. Liu'ao (六鳌)
16. Gulei (古雷)

The last two (Liu'ao and Gulei) share names with the long peninsulas where they are situated, which project into the Taiwan Strait to form large bays.

There are also four townships (乡): Nanpu (南浦), Chitu (赤土), Huxi (湖西) and Chiling (赤岭). The latter two are protected ethnic (minority) townships (民族乡), both for the She people.

== Transportation ==
The major Shenyang–Haikou coastal expressway cuts through the county, keeping about midway between the coast and the old China National Highway 324.

The Xiamen–Shenzhen Railway runs through Zhangpu County; its Zhangpu Railway Station is located a few kilometers to the west of the county seat.

== Historical sites ==
Zhangpu used to have over 50 fortresses, many of which are now abandoned.

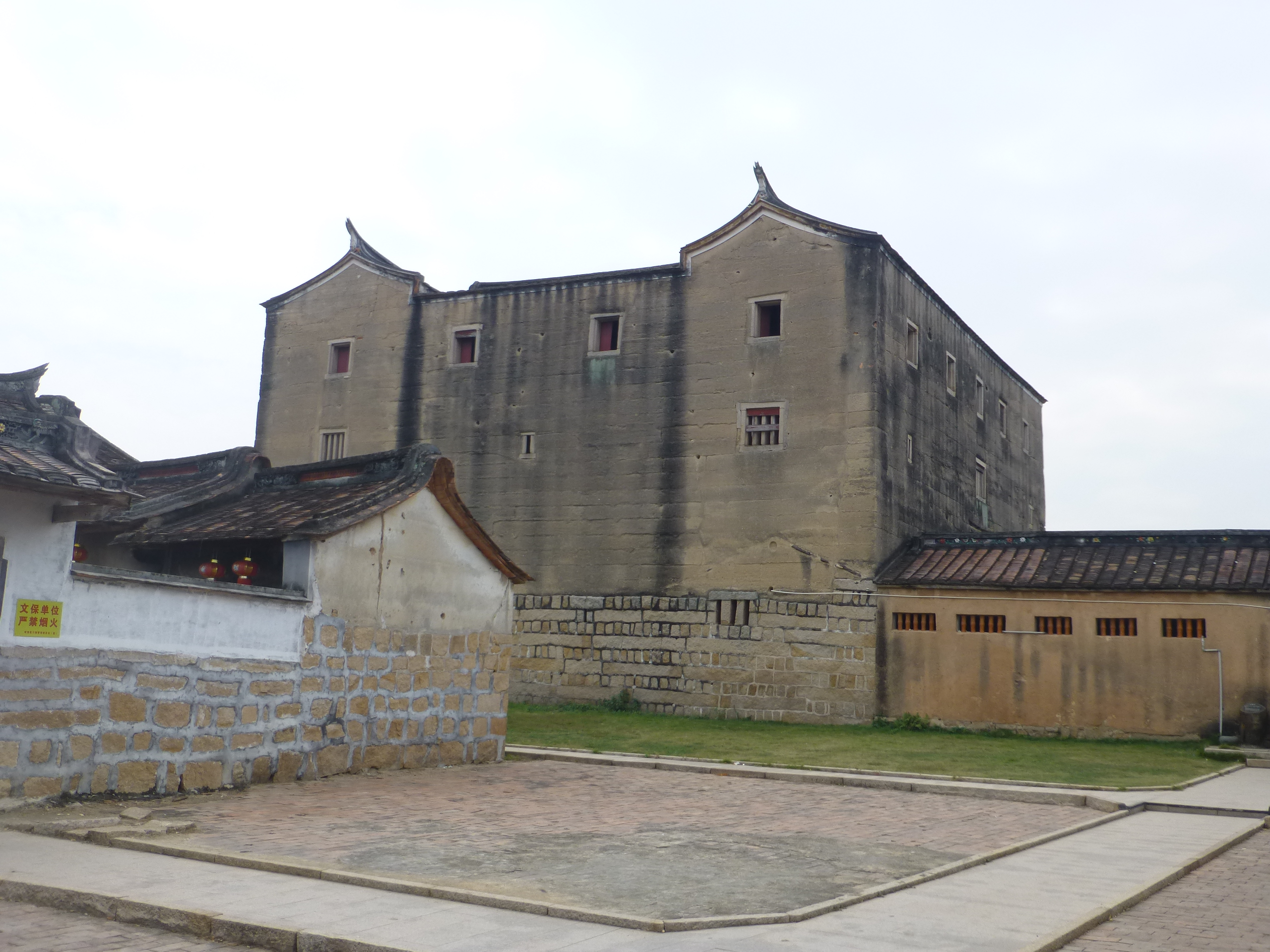
Wanbilou, the main building of Zhaojiabao

In Huxi She Township (湖西畲族乡) there is a fortified compound called Zhaojiabao (赵家堡), where a party of Southern Song royals in flight from the Mongol invaders of the late 13th century are said to have taken up a residence long in term and low in profile. With the Ming restoration of Han Chinese ethnic supremacy to the empire some ninety years and five generations later, the Zhao family (赵家) revealed their pedigree and the compound received its current name.

Zhaojiabao has its own exit right on the Shenyang—Haikou expressway, about 40 minutes south of downtown Zhangzhou (i.e. of Zhangzhou' central urban district, Xiangcheng).

Another fortified compound, Yianbao (诒安堡), dating from the Kangxi era (1687) is located in the same Huxi She Autonomous Township as well.

The ruins of the Liu'ao Fortress (六鳌古城; Liù'áo gǔchéng, or 六鳌城墙; Liù'áo chéngqiáng) are located near the tip of the Liu'ao Peninsula. The fortress - a contemporary of the better known (and much better preserved - or restored) Chongwu Fortress in Hui'an County - was constructed in 1388 by the Hongwu Emperor's general Zhou Dexing.

Zhangpu Confucian Temple, built in 1070 and reconstructed in 1369, is listed among the sixth batch of "Major National Historical and Cultural Sites in Fujian".

=== Fujian tulou ===
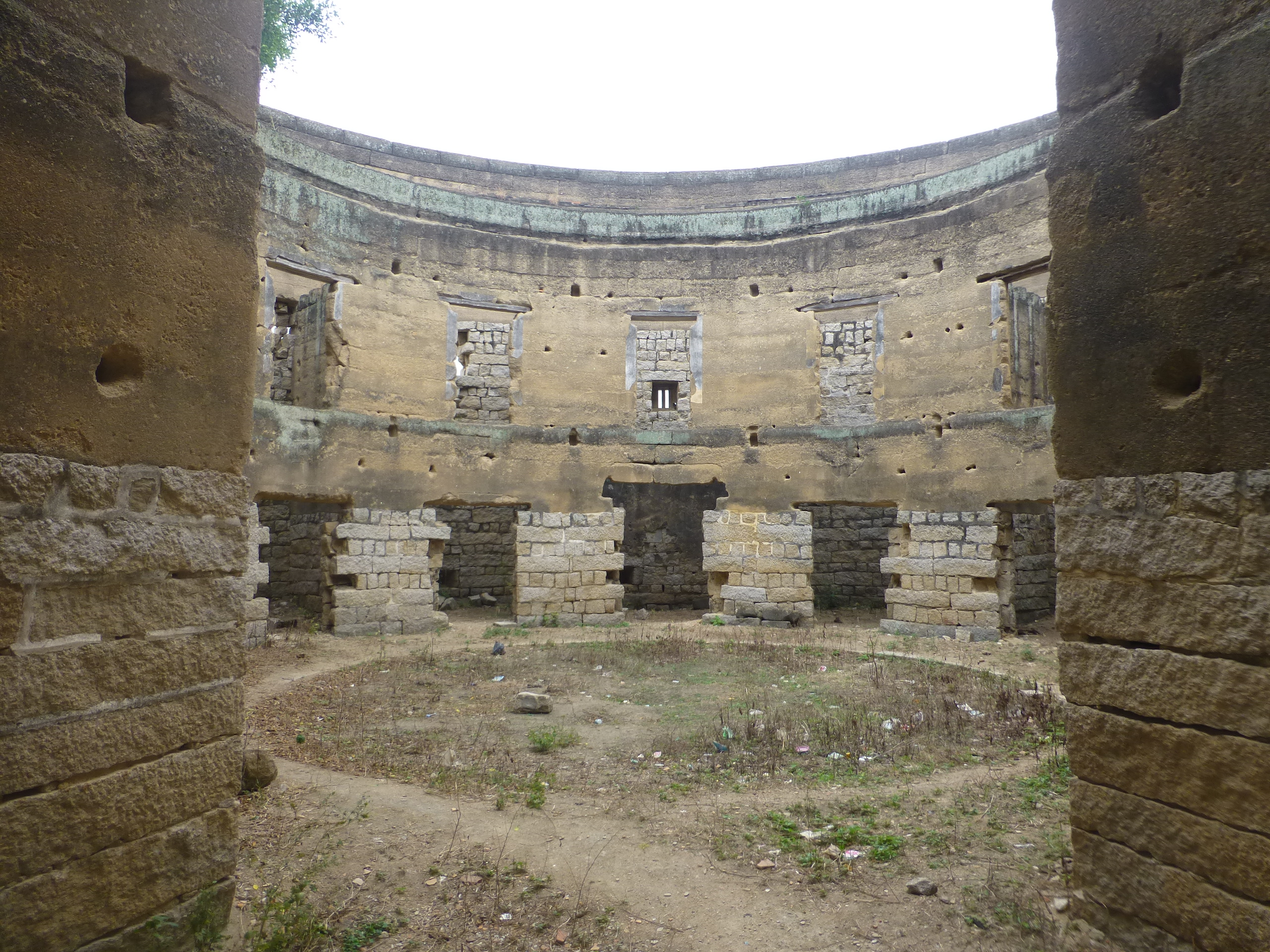
Inside Rui'an Lou, an abandoned Jiaqing-era tulou (Shentu Town)

Although most of the famous Fujian tulou are located in Fujian's interior (Nanjing County, Yongding County, and surrounding areas), there are also a few tulou structures in Zhangpu County. According to a 2001 survey of Fujian's tulou, out of the province's 3733 tulou known to the researchers, 125 were located within Zhangpu County. Among them were 60 round tulou (out of the total of 1193 such structures in the province), 48 rectangular ones, and 17 of other types.

A characteristic feature of the tulou of Zhangpu County (and of the coastal Fujian in general) was the use of granite blocks for the lower part of the wall, as opposed to boulders/cobblestones which were used for a similar purpose in Fujian's interior.

Although the local folk tradition may claim greater antiquity for some tulou elsewhere, several of the oldest tulou whose age is documented are located in Zhangpu county. According to Huang Hanmin, the oldest currently known construction date for any of China's tulou is 1558 - which is the date (Year 37 of the Jiajing era) that appears above the main gate of Yidelou (一德楼), a rectangular tulou in Makeng Village (马坑村), Sui'an Town, Zhangpu County. It is a three-storey rectangular compound with walls 1.3 m thick; the compound is surrounded by an elliptic wall 1.6 m tall. It was damaged by bombs dropped from a Japanese aircraft in 1934.

Several more tulou of comparable age (all of them of the rectangular type) are found within Zhangpu County as well. Merely two years "younger" than Yidelou is another three-storey rectangular tulou, Yiyanlou (贻燕楼), located in Guotian Village (过田村) of Xiamei Town (霞美镇), Yiyan Lou (贻燕楼) and dated 1560 (Jiajing 39) by a similar door inscription. In Yuntou (运头) Village of the same town, Qingyunlou (庆云楼) is dated 1569 (Longqing 3). Yanhailou (晏海楼) in Tanzitou Village (潭仔头村, or 昙仔头村), Jiu Town (旧镇) dates from 1585, and the construction of Wanbilou (完璧楼), which is located inside the Zhaojiabao (see above) started in 1600.

Out of the 56 "exemplary tulou" listed in Huang Hanmin's monograph, 6 are in Zhangpu County. One of them, Jinjiang Lou (24.063501°N 117.773239°E), located in Jinjiang village of Shentu Town, was built in 1791-1803, and consists of 3 concentric rings. It is one of the few tulou located in the immediate proximity (a few kilometers) of Fujian's sea coast.

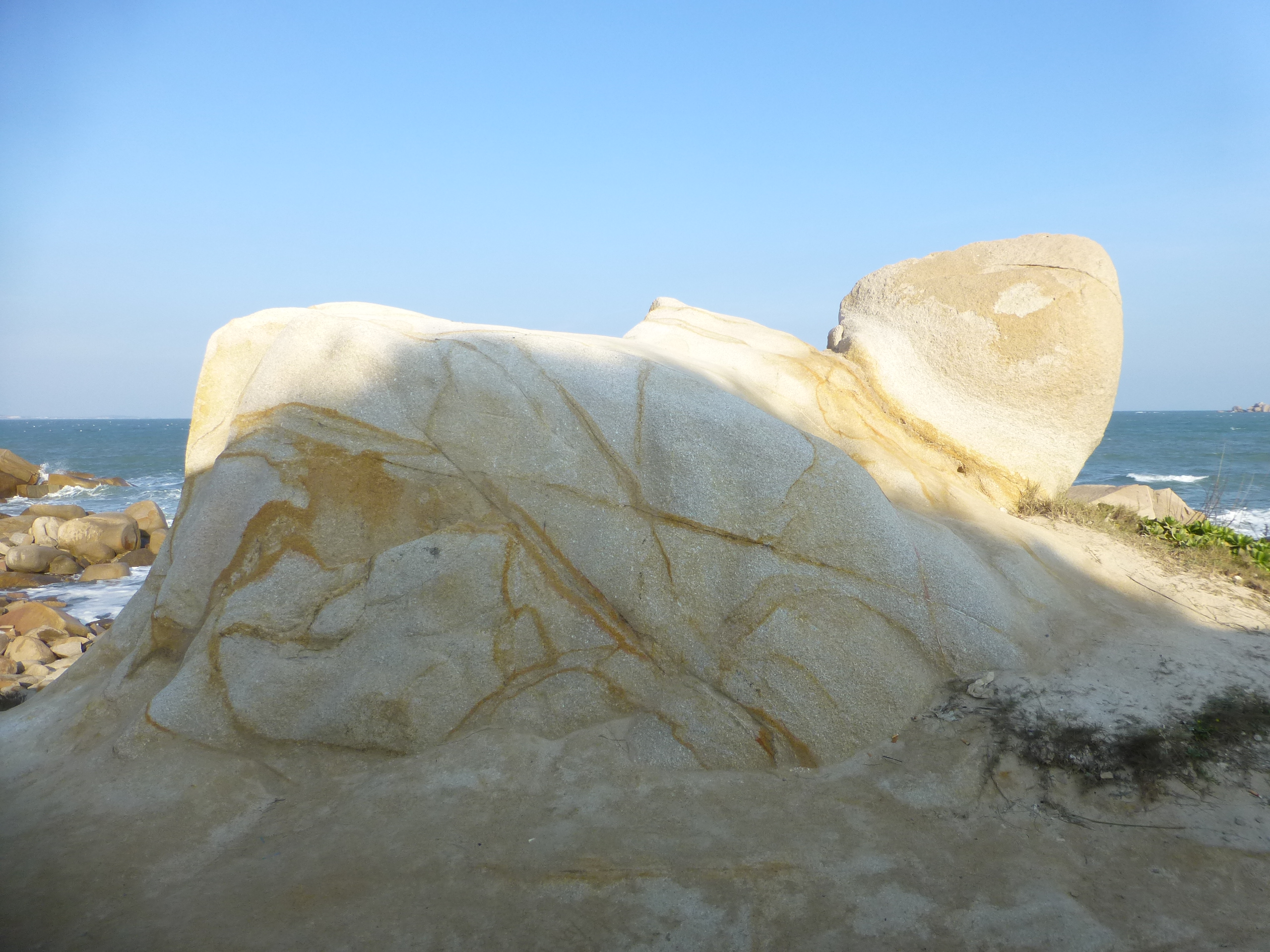
One of the many unusual natural rock formations at the site known as the Liu'ao Abstract Art Gallery

== Notable people ==
- Huang Daozhou, scholar and calligrapher during the Ming Dynasty
- Lin Hejie, painter

== Climate ==
Climate data for Zhangpu, elevation 61 m (200 ft), (1991–2020 normals, extremes 1981–2010)
Month	Jan	Feb	Mar	Apr	May	Jun	Jul	Aug	Sep	Oct	Nov	Dec	Year
Record high °C (°F)	29.0 (84.2)	30.0 (86.0)	32.2 (90.0)	35.2 (95.4)	35.9 (96.6)	37.4 (99.3)	38.7 (101.7)	37.5 (99.5)	36.3 (97.3)	34.8 (94.6)	32.5 (90.5)	29.1 (84.4)	38.7 (101.7)
Mean daily maximum °C (°F)	18.6 (65.5)	19.1 (66.4)	21.3 (70.3)	25.3 (77.5)	28.4 (83.1)	30.8 (87.4)	32.9 (91.2)	32.6 (90.7)	31.3 (88.3)	28.4 (83.1)	24.8 (76.6)	20.5 (68.9)	26.2 (79.1)
Daily mean °C (°F)	13.8 (56.8)	14.2 (57.6)	16.4 (61.5)	20.4 (68.7)	24.0 (75.2)	26.9 (80.4)	28.5 (83.3)	28.1 (82.6)	26.8 (80.2)	23.6 (74.5)	20.0 (68.0)	15.7 (60.3)	21.5 (70.8)
Mean daily minimum °C (°F)	10.7 (51.3)	11.3 (52.3)	13.3 (55.9)	17.2 (63.0)	21.0 (69.8)	24.1 (75.4)	25.2 (77.4)	24.9 (76.8)	23.6 (74.5)	20.1 (68.2)	16.7 (62.1)	12.4 (54.3)	18.4 (65.1)
Record low °C (°F)	1.3 (34.3)	1.4 (34.5)	1.9 (35.4)	7.3 (45.1)	12.3 (54.1)	15.9 (60.6)	21.6 (70.9)	21.9 (71.4)	16.6 (61.9)	11.5 (52.7)	5.8 (42.4)	0.1 (32.2)	0.1 (32.2)
Average precipitation mm (inches)	44.7 (1.76)	69.9 (2.75)	101.7 (4.00)	137.6 (5.42)	215.3 (8.48)	283.1 (11.15)	162.4 (6.39)	264.0 (10.39)	161.8 (6.37)	58.1 (2.29)	43.2 (1.70)	43.2 (1.70)	1,585 (62.4)
Average precipitation days (≥ 0.1 mm)	6.9	9.7	12.9	12.8	15.3	17.1	10.9	13.8	9.7	3.2	5.0	6.1	123.4
Average relative humidity (%)	73	76	78	78	81	83	79	80	77	69	71	70	76
Mean monthly sunshine hours	123.7	99.9	103.5	117.6	129.6	150.0	226.4	198.2	172.9	176.6	144.3	136.1	1,778.8
Percentage possible sunshine	37	31	28	31	31	37	54	50	47	50	44	41	40
Source: China Meteorological Administration
