= Dongshan County =

Dongshan County 东山县 Tungshan; Tung shan
- County
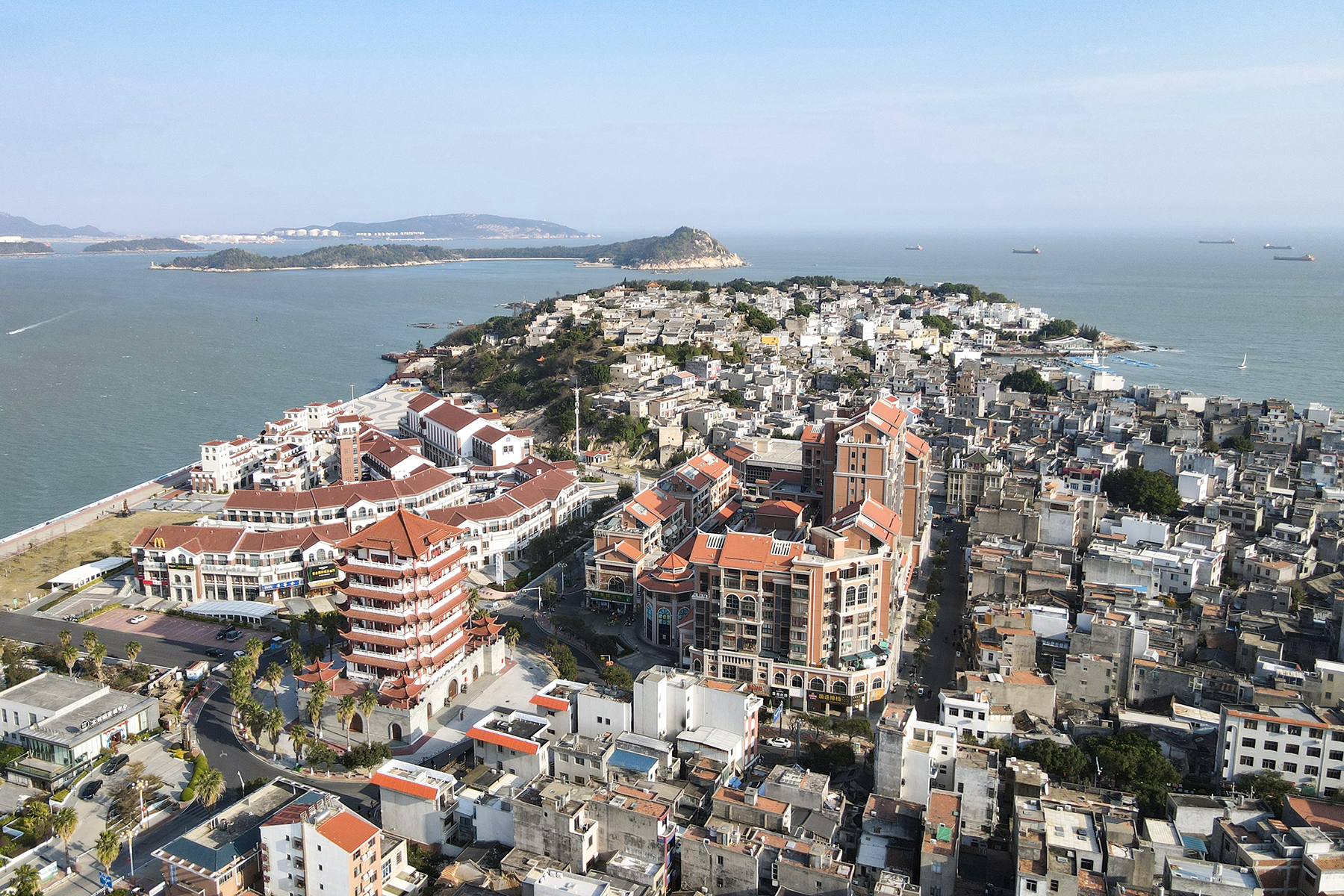
- Tongling Town, Dongshan

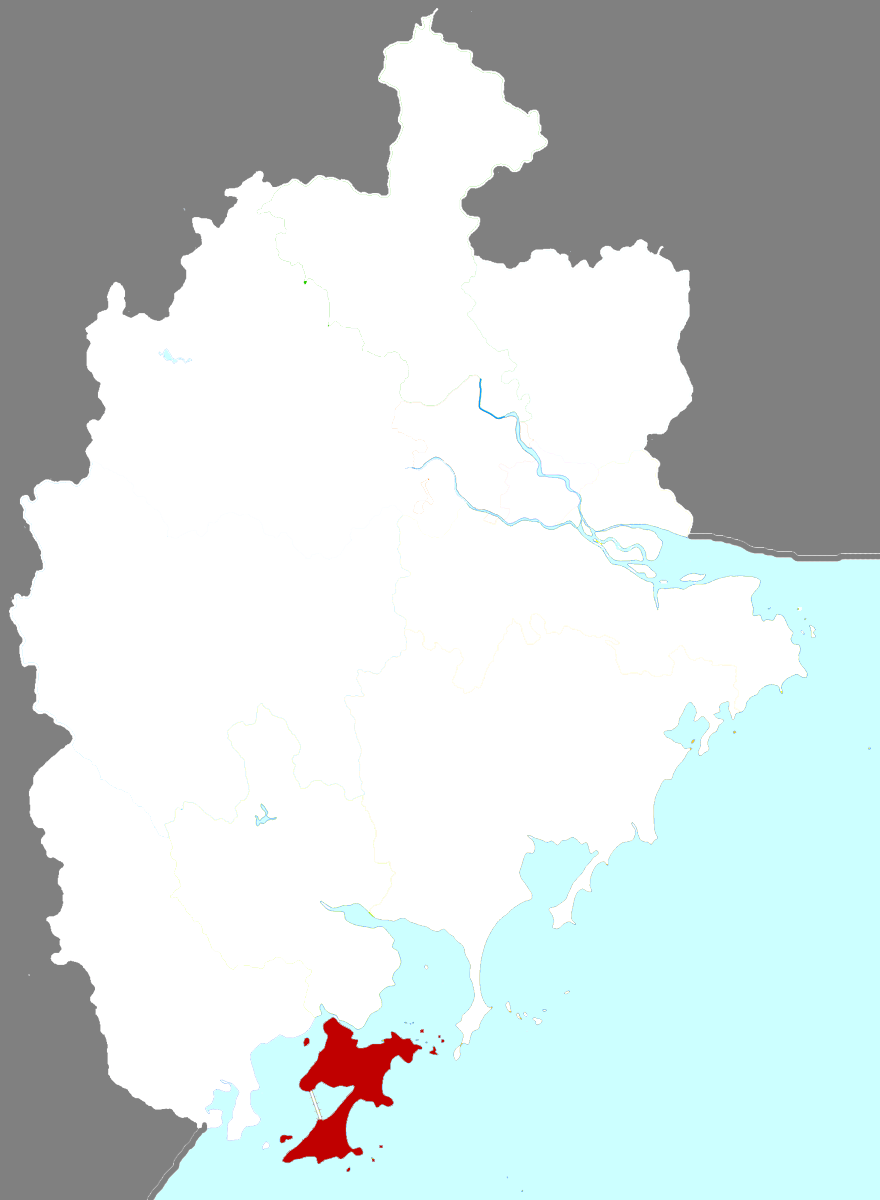
- Location of Dongshan in Zhangzhou

- Location in Fujian
- Coordinates: 23°41′58″N 117°25′13″E
- Country: People's Republic of China
- Province: Fujian
- Prefecture-level city: Zhangzhou

Area
  - Total: 194 km^{2} (75 sq mi)

Population (2020)
  - Total: 219,511
  - Density: 1,130/km^{2} (2,930/sq mi)
- Time zone: UTC+8 (China Standard)

Dongshan (simplified Chinese: 东山县; traditional Chinese: 東山縣; pinyin: Dōngshān Xiàn; Pe̍h-ōe-jī: Tang-soaⁿ-koān) is a county of far southern Fujian Province, People's Republic of China, located along the Taiwan Strait. It comprises 44 islands for a total area of 194 square kilometres (75 sq mi), and is under the administration of Zhangzhou City. The total population was around 220,000 in 2020. Dongshan County has jurisdiction over seven towns, a nationally managed forest and an economic and technological development district. It is an important port for international trade and trade with Taiwan.

== History ==
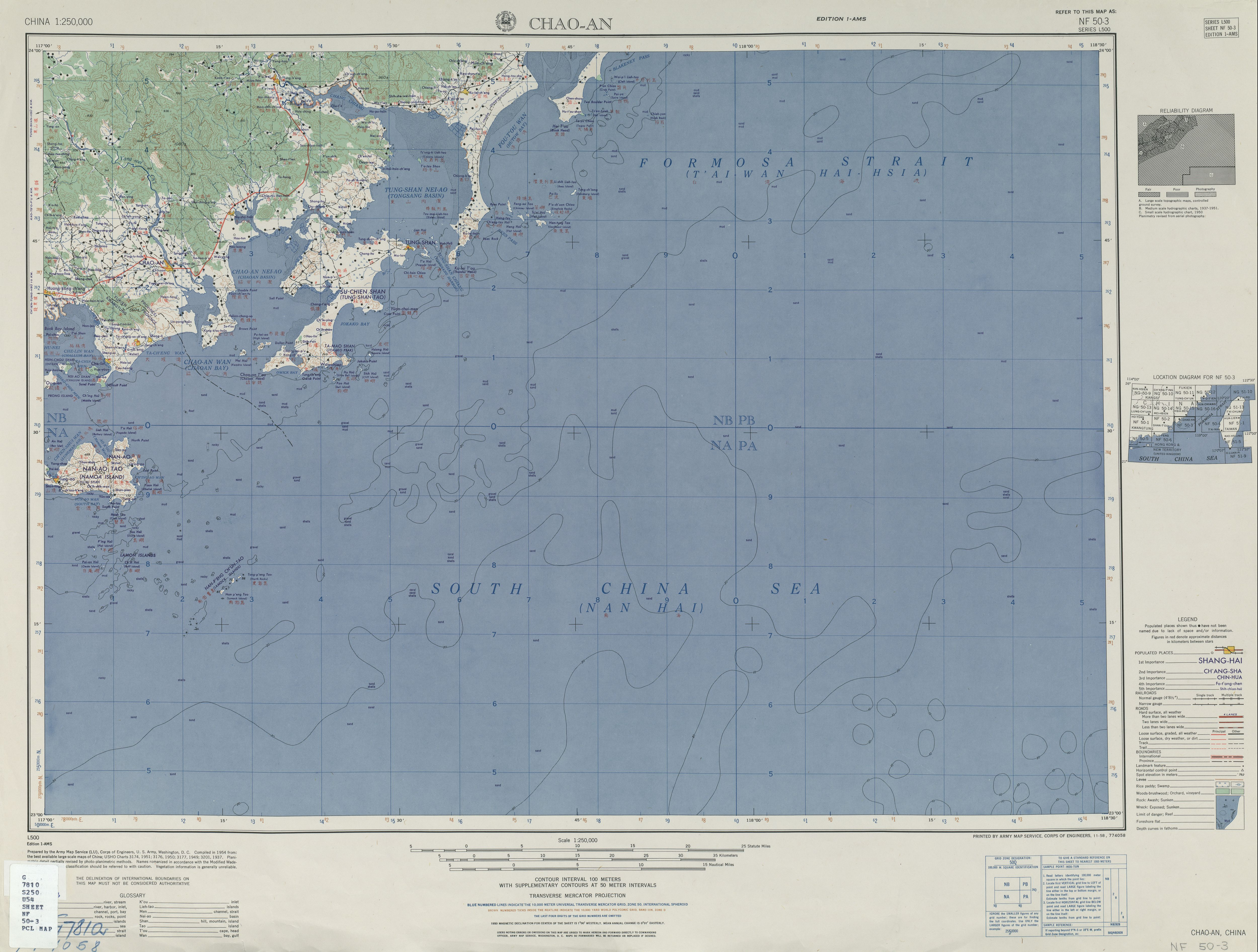
Dongshan Island (labelled as SU-CHIEN SHAN (TUNG-SHAN-TAO) 蘇尖山) (1954)

On one of the islands, there are several ancient relics, including the 'Mountain of the Nine Immortals', and the Dongshan ancient city, where two famous Ming Dynasty generals, Qi Jiguang and Zheng Chenggong were based.

Tongling Town on Northeastern Dongshan Island has an ancient waterside castle. Tonghshan Castle was built of stone in 1387 by Zhou Dexing of the Ming Dynasty to protect against Japanese pirates. The gate tower still stands intact. Inside, a path is linked by corridors and the exquisite Temple of Guan Yu. The entrance to the temple is flanked by ancient houses, the birthplace of Huang Daozhou, an official of the Ming Dynasty.

In 1950, at the end of the Chinese Civil War, the island was the scene of fighting between the nationalist Kuomintang and Chinese Communist forces, and again in 1953 during the so-called Dongshan Island Campaign, an unsuccessful attempt by the nationalists to retake the island.

== Economy ==
Dongshan County is situated between two economically vibrant cities of Xiamen and Shantou. Both are Special Economic Zones which have spillover economic effects for Dongshan County, such as increased tourism. The total GDP of islands in 2003 was 3.62 billion yuan. The main industries are fishery, fish farming and asparagus farming.

=== Tourism ===
The tourism industry is based on rich ancient history, seaside resorts and breath taking scenery.

== Administration ==
There are seven towns (镇; zhèn) under the county's administration:

- Xibu (西埔镇), the county seat
- Tongling (铜陵镇), former county seat
- Qianlou (前楼镇)
- Chencheng (陈城镇)
- Kangmei (康美镇)
- Zhangtang (樟塘镇)
- Xingchen (杏陈镇)

The county has jurisdiction over a nationally managed forest and an economic and technological development district.

== Geography and climate ==
Dongshan is located in the southernmost part of the province, with Kaohsiung, Taiwan 110 nautical miles (200 km; 130 mi) to the east and Hong Kong 210 nautical miles (390 km; 240 mi) to the southwest.

The climate of the Dongshan Islands is humid subtropical (Köppen Cfa) and moderated by their coastal location, without frost through the year. In winter, north-east winds, and in summer south-east winds prevail. The annual average temperature is 20.9 °C (69.6 °F). The coolest month of the year is February with an average temperature of 13.1 °C (55.6 °F); the hottest, July, with an average temperature of 27.5 °C (81.5 °F). The annual average rainfall is only 1,256 millimetres (49.4 in), which causes a shortage of fresh water, especially from October to January. Additional water must be acquired from outside for both domestic and industrial use.

Climate data for Dongshan, elevation 53 m (174 ft), (1991–2020 normals, extremes 1957–present)
Month	Jan	Feb	Mar	Apr	May	Jun	Jul	Aug	Sep	Oct	Nov	Dec	Year
Record high °C (°F)	24.8 (76.6)	27.5 (81.5)	28.4 (83.1)	30.0 (86.0)	32.5 (90.5)	34.1 (93.4)	35.6 (96.1)	37.1 (98.8)	34.4 (93.9)	35.0 (95.0)	31.6 (88.9)	28.0 (82.4)	37.1 (98.8)
Mean daily maximum °C (°F)	16.7 (62.1)	16.9 (62.4)	19.0 (66.2)	23.1 (73.6)	26.8 (80.2)	29.4 (84.9)	31.1 (88.0)	31.0 (87.8)	30.3 (86.5)	27.3 (81.1)	23.6 (74.5)	19.1 (66.4)	24.5 (76.1)
Daily mean °C (°F)	13.8 (56.8)	13.8 (56.8)	15.8 (60.4)	19.9 (67.8)	23.9 (75.0)	26.7 (80.1)	27.9 (82.2)	27.8 (82.0)	27.1 (80.8)	24.2 (75.6)	20.5 (68.9)	16.2 (61.2)	21.5 (70.6)
Mean daily minimum °C (°F)	12.0 (53.6)	12.0 (53.6)	13.8 (56.8)	17.7 (63.9)	21.9 (71.4)	24.8 (76.6)	25.7 (78.3)	25.6 (78.1)	24.9 (76.8)	22.2 (72.0)	18.5 (65.3)	14.3 (57.7)	19.5 (67.0)
Record low °C (°F)	2.5 (36.5)	3.8 (38.8)	5.0 (41.0)	7.1 (44.8)	14.5 (58.1)	17.7 (63.9)	21.4 (70.5)	21.1 (70.0)	17.9 (64.2)	14.1 (57.4)	9.0 (48.2)	4.7 (40.5)	2.5 (36.5)
Average precipitation mm (inches)	33.6 (1.32)	52.5 (2.07)	85.8 (3.38)	112.9 (4.44)	139.3 (5.48)	217.3 (8.56)	143.1 (5.63)	230.0 (9.06)	123.4 (4.86)	41.6 (1.64)	40.4 (1.59)	37.8 (1.49)	1,257.7 (49.52)
Average precipitation days (≥ 0.1 mm)	5.6	8.8	10.6	11.1	12.7	13.9	8.8	11.1	7.5	2.9	4.2	5.6	102.8
Average relative humidity (%)	76	79	81	82	84	87	83	83	77	70	73	73	79
Mean monthly sunshine hours	153.7	119.8	123.4	140.1	163.2	193.2	271.2	243.0	222.0	223.3	183.3	166.4	2,202.6
Percentage possible sunshine	46	37	33	37	40	48	66	61	61	63	56	51	50
Source 1: China Meteorological Administration All-time August Record Highall-time lowall-timeFeb low
Source 2: Weather China

== Transport ==
Dongshan Port is one of the main ports in Fujian, open to foreign vessels since 2003 and very close to Taiwan and Hong Kong. The port has a large body of water, large hinterland, and a deep, sediment-free harbour. The harbour is big enough for twenty-two 10,000 tons berths. Currently, the port has two deep water harbours built to accommodate 3,000 tons berths. These facilities provide Dongshan Port an important commercial link between Xiamen and Shantou.
