= Ninghua railway station =

Railway station in Ninghua, Sanming, Fujian

Ninghua 宁化

General information
- Location: Ninghua County, Sanming, Fujian; China
- Coordinates: 26.246649°N 116.728201°E
- Lines: Xingguo–Quanzhou railway; Pucheng–Meizhou railway

History
- Opened: 30 September 2021
Location

Ninghua railway station (Chinese: 宁化站) is a railway station in Ninghua County, Sanming, Fujian, China. It is an intermediate stop on both the Xingguo–Quanzhou railway and the Pucheng–Meizhou railway.

Preceding station	China Railway	Following station
Shicheng East towards Xingguo	Xingguo–Quanzhou railway	Qingliu towards Quanzhou
Shuiqian towards Pucheng	Pucheng–Meizhou railway	Qingliu towards Meizhou
