= Jianningxian North railway station =

Railway station in Sanming, Fujian, China

Jianningxian North 建宁县北
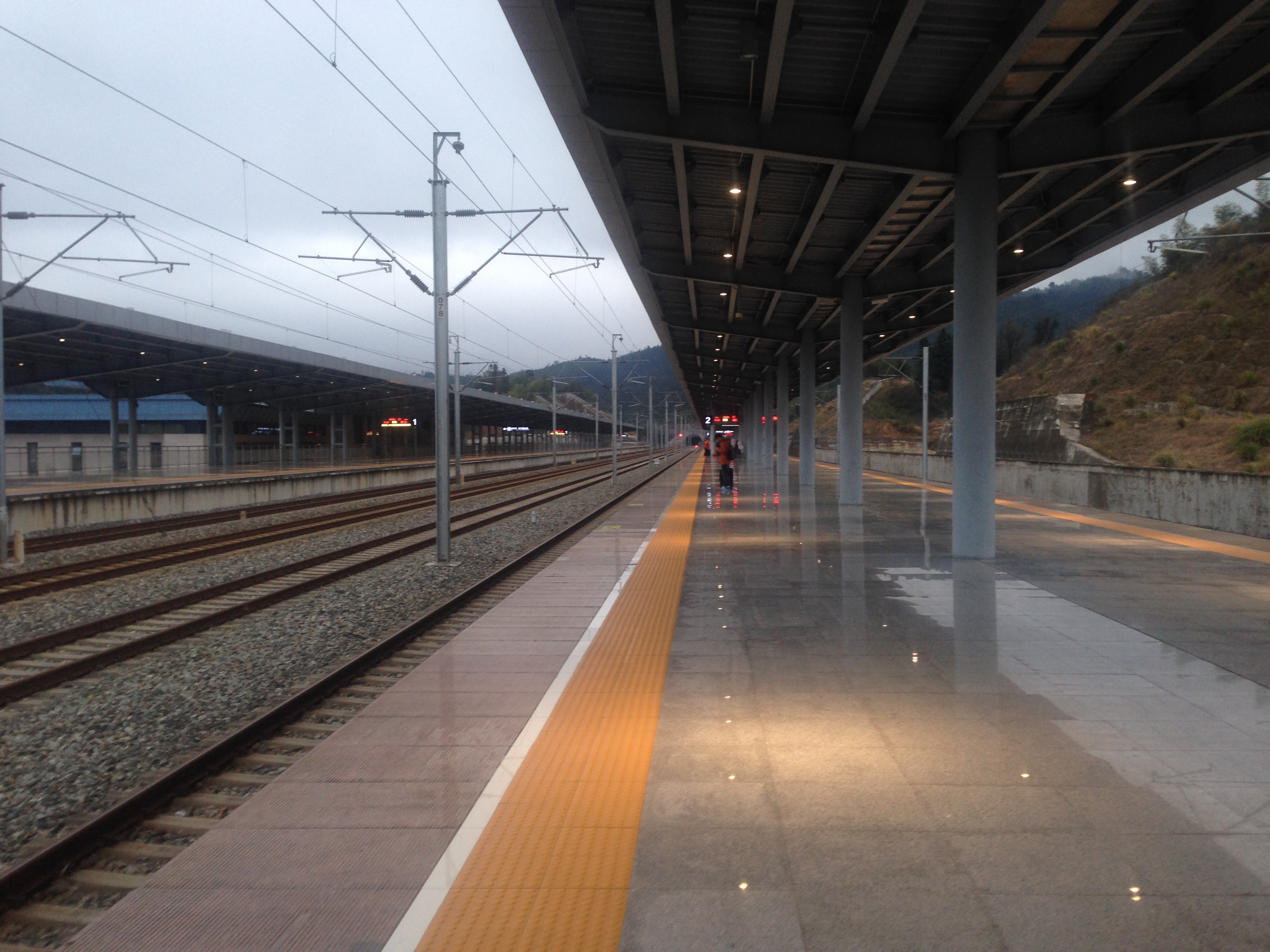

General information
- Location: Jianning County, Sanming, Fujian; China
- Lines: Xiangtang–Putian railway; Pucheng–Meizhou railway; Jianning–Longyan railway (under construction)

History
- Opened: 26 September 2013
Location

Jianningxian North railway station (Chinese: 建宁县北站) is a railway station located in Jianning County, Sanming, Fujian, China. It is an intermediate station on the Xiangtang–Putian railway and the northern terminus of the Jianning–Longyan railway.

== History ==
The station opened on 26 September 2013.
