= Xingguo–Quanzhou railway =

Railway line in China

Overview
- Status: Operational
- Termini: Xingguo; Quanzhou

Service
- Type: Heavy rail

History
- Opened: 30 September 2021 (Xingguo–Qingliu); 30 December 2022 (Qingliu–Quanzhou)

Technical
- Line length: 464 km (288 mi)
- Track gauge: 1,435 mm (4 ft 8 1/2 in) standard gauge
- Electrification: 50 Hz 25,000 V
- Operating speed: 160 km/h (99 mph)

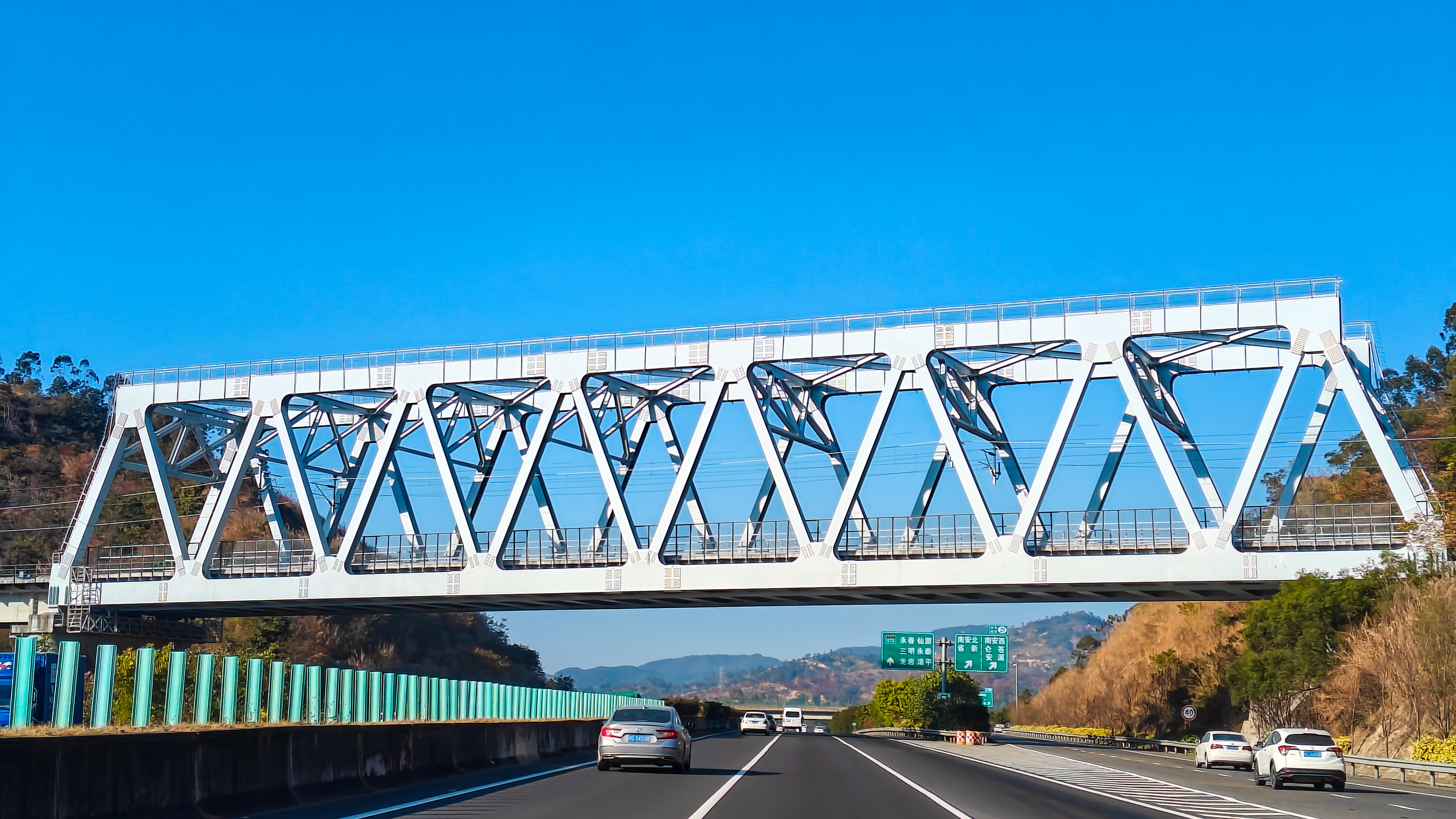
The Xingquan Railway passes through Shengxin Town, Nan'an City, and crosses the G72 Quannan Expressway via a railway bridge.

The Xingguo–Quanzhou railway or Xingquan railway (Chinese: 兴泉铁路; pinyin: Xīngquán Tiělù) is a single-track railway line in China. The line is 464 kilometres (288 mi) long and has a design speed of 160 kilometres per hour (99 mph).

== History ==
The section between Xingguo and Qingliu opened on 30 September 2021. The section between Qingliu and Quanzhou opened on 30 December 2022.

== Stations ==
- Xingguo
- Butou
- Yudu North
- Laicun
- Ningdu
- Guoziyuan
- Heshuxia
- Shicheng East
- Ailouling
- Ninghua
- Qingliu
- Wenjiao
- Mingxi
- Sanyuan West
- Xikeng
- Yong'an South
- Gezhou
- Guangqian
- Xiaohu
- Datian North
- Yangtian
- Dehua
- Yongchun
- Penghua
- Anxi East
- Nan'an North
- Xuefeng
- Quanzhou
