= Xingguo railway station =

Railway station in Xingguo, Ganzhou, Jiangxi

Xingguo 兴国
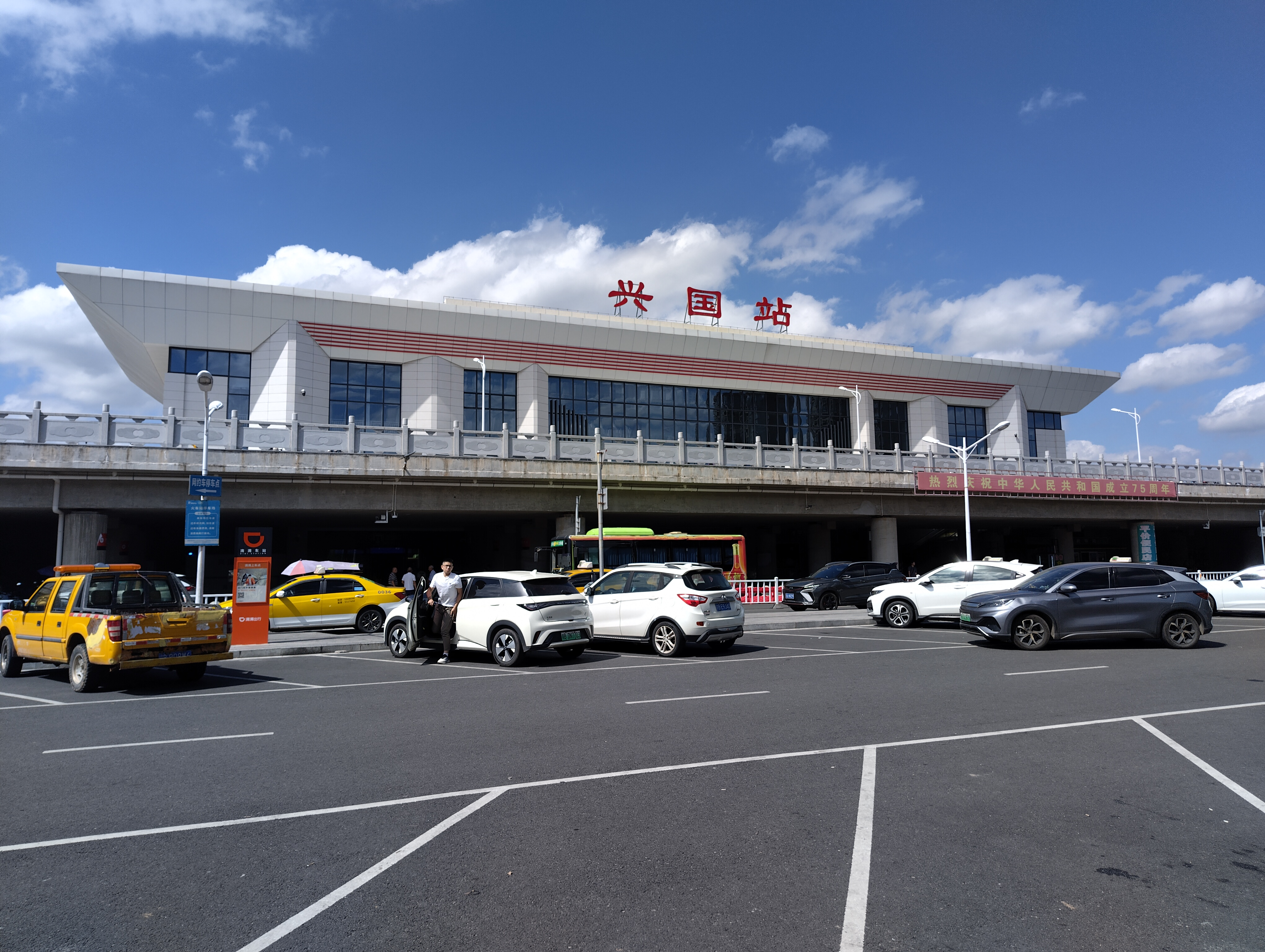

General information
- Location: Xingguo County, Ganzhou, Jiangxi; China
- Coordinates: 26°19′59″N 115°18′48″E
- Lines: Beijing–Kowloon railway; Xingguo–Quanzhou railway

History
- Opened: 1996
Location

Xingguo railway station (Chinese: 兴国站) is a railway station in Xingguo County, Ganzhou, Jiangxi, China. It is an intermediate stop on the Beijing–Kowloon railway and the western terminus of the Xingguo–Quanzhou railway.

== History ==
The station opened in 1996. From 8 December 2019, facilities were moved to a temporary room to allow the main station building to be rebuilt. The new station building was opened on 26 September 2021.

| Preceding station | China Railway | Following station |
|---|---|---|
| Taihe towards Beijing West | Beijing–Kowloon railway | Ganzhou towards Hung Hom |
| Terminus | Xingguo–Quanzhou railway | Ningdu towards Quanzhou |
