= Pucheng–Meizhou railway =

Railway line in China

Overview
- Native name: 浦梅铁路
- Status: Partially open
- Termini: Pucheng; Meizhou

Service
- Type: Heavy rail

History
- Opened: 30 September 2021 (Jianningxian–Guanzhishan)

Technical
- Track gauge: 1,435 mm (4 ft 8 1/2 in) standard gauge
- Electrification: 50 Hz 25,000 V
- Operating speed: 160 km/h (99 mph)

The Pucheng–Meizhou railway (Chinese: 浦梅铁路) is a railway line in China. It has a maximum speed of 160 kilometres per hour (99 mph).

== History ==
Tracklaying between Jianning and Guanzhishan was completed in December 2020. The line had been expected to open in June 2021. The 162-kilometre (101-mile) section between Jianningxian and Guanzhishan opened on 30 September 2021.
