= Xianju South railway station =

Railway station in Taizhou, Zhejiang

Xianju South 仙居南
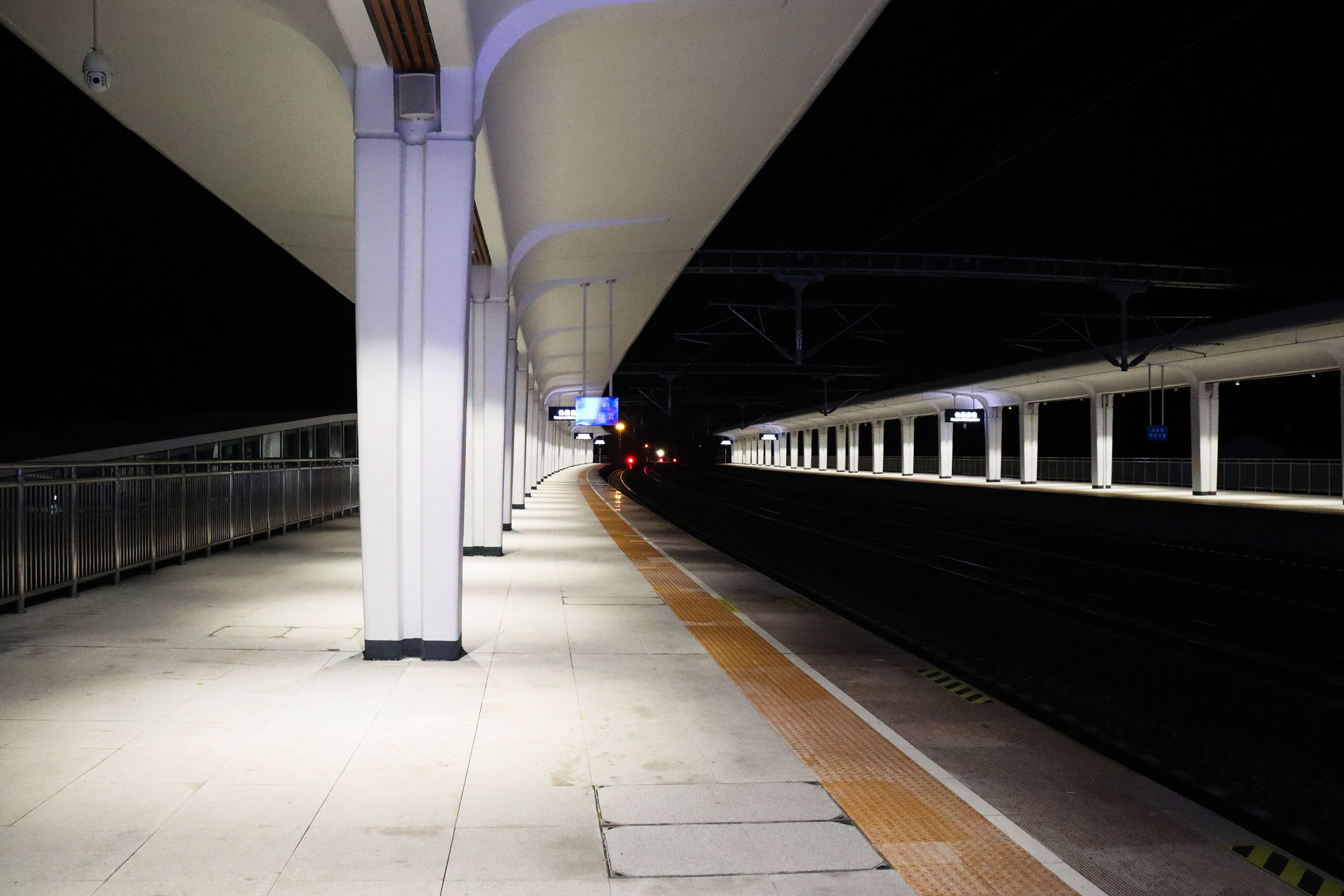

General information
- Location: Xianju County, Taizhou, Zhejiang; China
- Coordinates: 28°49′24″N 120°44′54″E
- Line: Jinhua–Taizhou railway
- Platforms: 2

History
- Opened: 11 August 2021
Location

Xianju South railway station (Chinese: 仙居南站) is a railway station in Xianju County, Taizhou, Zhejiang, China. It is an intermediate stop on the Jinhua–Taizhou railway. The station opened on 11 August 2021.

It has two platforms and two through lines.

== See also ==
- Xianju railway station

Preceding station	China Railway	Following station
Pan'an South towards Yongkang South	Jinhua–Taizhou railway	Linhai South towards Taizhou West
