= Pan'an South railway station =

Railway station in Jinhua, Zhejiang

Pan'an South 磐安南

General information
- Location: Pan'an County, Jinhua, Zhejiang; China
- Coordinates: 28°54′41″N 120°20′24″E
- Line: Jinhua–Taizhou railway
- Platforms: 1

History
- Opened: 15 June 2021
Location

Pan'an South railway station (Chinese: 磐安南站; pinyin: Pán'ān Nán zhàn) is a railway station in Pan'an County, Jinhua, Zhejiang, China. It is an intermediate stop on the Jinhua–Taizhou railway. The station opened on 15 June 2021.

== Station layout ==
The station consists of one platform on a 4 track line. Two of the tracks are for passengers, and two are for freight. The station building is a 2-story structure located south of the platform, and there is a 6600 square meter freight yard north of the station.

== Services ==
Four trains stop at the station daily in each direction, heading towards Yongkang South and Taizhou West stations.

== History ==
The station was built as part of the Jinhua–Taizhou railway. The construction of the station started at the end of 2019, with the station building being topped and completed in June 2020 and December 2020 respectively, at a cost of around 580 million yuan. The station then opened on 15 June 2021, as Pan'an county's first railway station. The freight yard opened later on 27 May 2022.

According to People's Daily, the station has had a positive impact on the region, with the passenger station being cited for an increase of tourism and the freight yard supporting the region's Chinese medicine industry.

== Surrounding area ==
The station is located approximately 20 km southwest of Pan'an. Several large developments are planned around the station. An industrial park is planned north of the station to serve the freight yard. South of the station, a business plaza near the station building and a theme park by the river are also planned as part of the station development plan.

Preceding station	China Railway	Following station
Huzhen towards Yongkang South	Jinhua–Taizhou railway	Xianju South towards Taizhou West
