= Yongkang East railway station =

Railway station in Jinhua, Zhejiang

Coordinates: 28.8202°N 120.0753°E

Yongkang East 永康东

General information
- Location: Yongkang, Jinhua, Zhejiang; China
- Line: Jinhua–Taizhou railway

History
- Opened: 2021
Location
- Location within Zhejiang Location within China

Yongkang East railway station (Chinese: 永康东站) is a freight railway station on the Jinhua–Taizhou railway in Yongkang, Jinhua, Zhejiang, China.

== History ==
The station opened in 2021, replacing the freight facilities at Yongkang railway station, which was closed on 16 June 2021 when the Jinhua–Wenzhou railway was rerouted.
