= 仁川 =

仁川 may refer to:

- Incheon, city in South Korea
- Nigawa, river in Hyogo Prefecture, Japan
- Renchuan, town in Zhejiang, China
