= Duqiao railway station =

Railway station in Taizhou, Zhejiang

Duqiao 杜桥

General information
- Location: Linhai, Taizhou, Zhejiang; China
- Coordinates: 28.7799°N 121.4641°E
- Line: Jinhua–Taizhou railway
- Platforms: 1

History
- Opened: 25 June 2021
Location

Duqiao railway station (Chinese: 杜桥站) is a railway station in Linhai, Taizhou, Zhejiang, China. It is an intermediate stop on the Jinhua–Taizhou railway and was opened on 25 June 2021. The service level is one train each way per day. There is one platform and two additional lines running through the station without platforms.
