= Yongkang South railway station =

Railway station in Jinhua, Zhejiang

Yongkang South 永康南
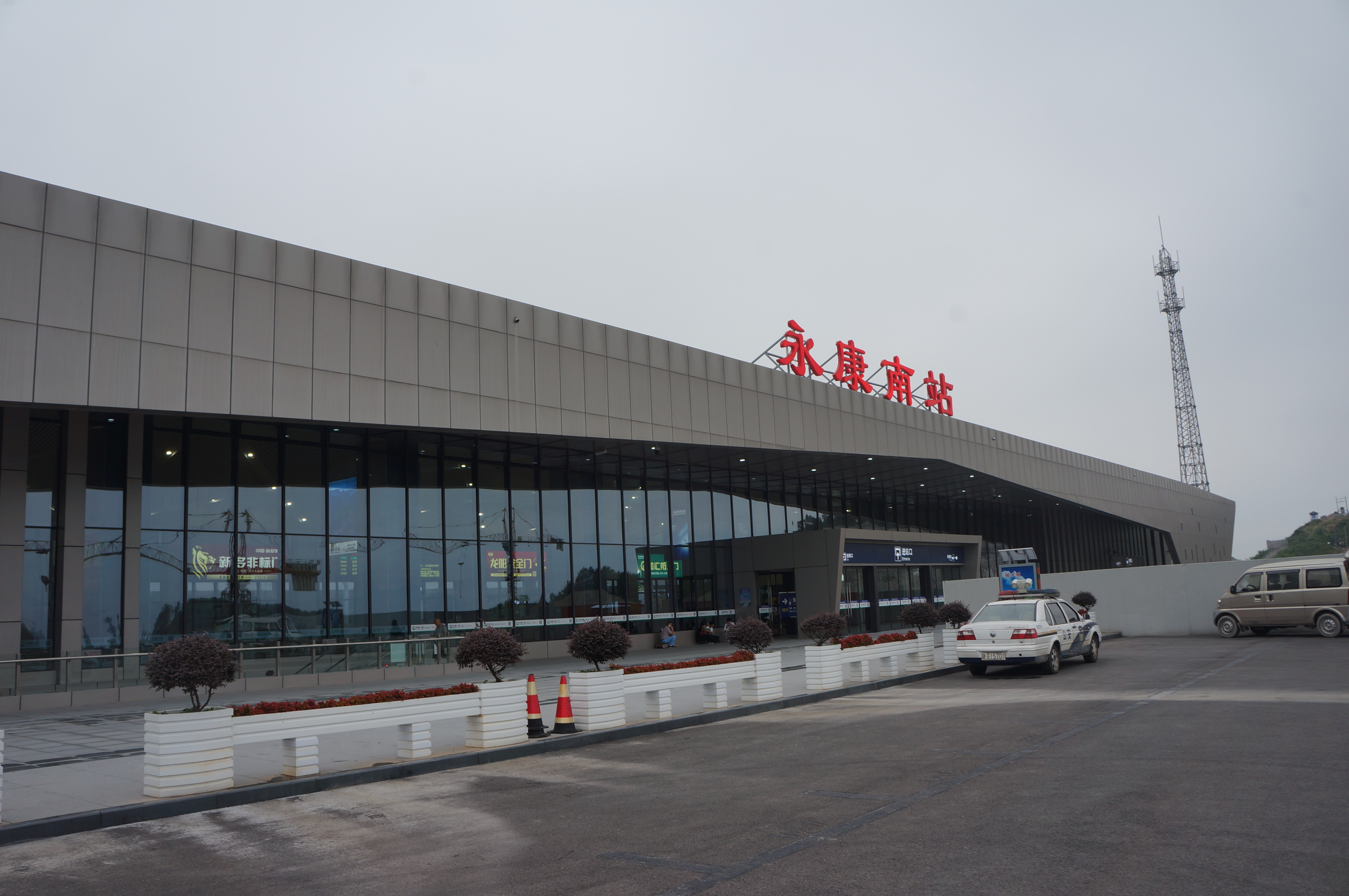
- Exterior of the station

General information
- Location: Yongkang, Jinhua, Zhejiang; China
- Coordinates: 28°51′11.17″N 120°1′8.25″E
- Lines: Jinhua–Wenzhou high-speed railway; Jinhua–Wenzhou railway; Jinhua–Taizhou railway

History
- Opened: 26 December 2015
Location

Yongkang South railway station (Chinese: 永康南站) is a railway station in Yongkang, Jinhua, Zhejiang, China. It is the only passenger railway station in the city. Freight is handled by Yongkang East.

== History ==
The station opened on 26 December 2015 with the Jinhua–Wenzhou high-speed railway. In June 2021, a project to divert the Jinhua–Wenzhou railway via Yongkang South was completed. The last service called at Yongkang railway station on 15 June 2021, all services at Yongkang now call at Yongkang South. On 25 June 2021, the Jinhua–Taizhou railway opened, of which Yongkang South is the eastern terminus.

Preceding station	China Railway High-speed	Following station
Wuyi North towards Jinhua	Jinhua–Wenzhou high-speed railway	Jinyun West towards Wenzhou South
Preceding station	China Railway	Following station
Wuyi towards Jinhua	Jinhua–Wenzhou railway	Jinyun towards Wenzhou
Terminus	Jinhua–Taizhou railway	Huzhen towards Taizhou West
