= LEOW (artist) =

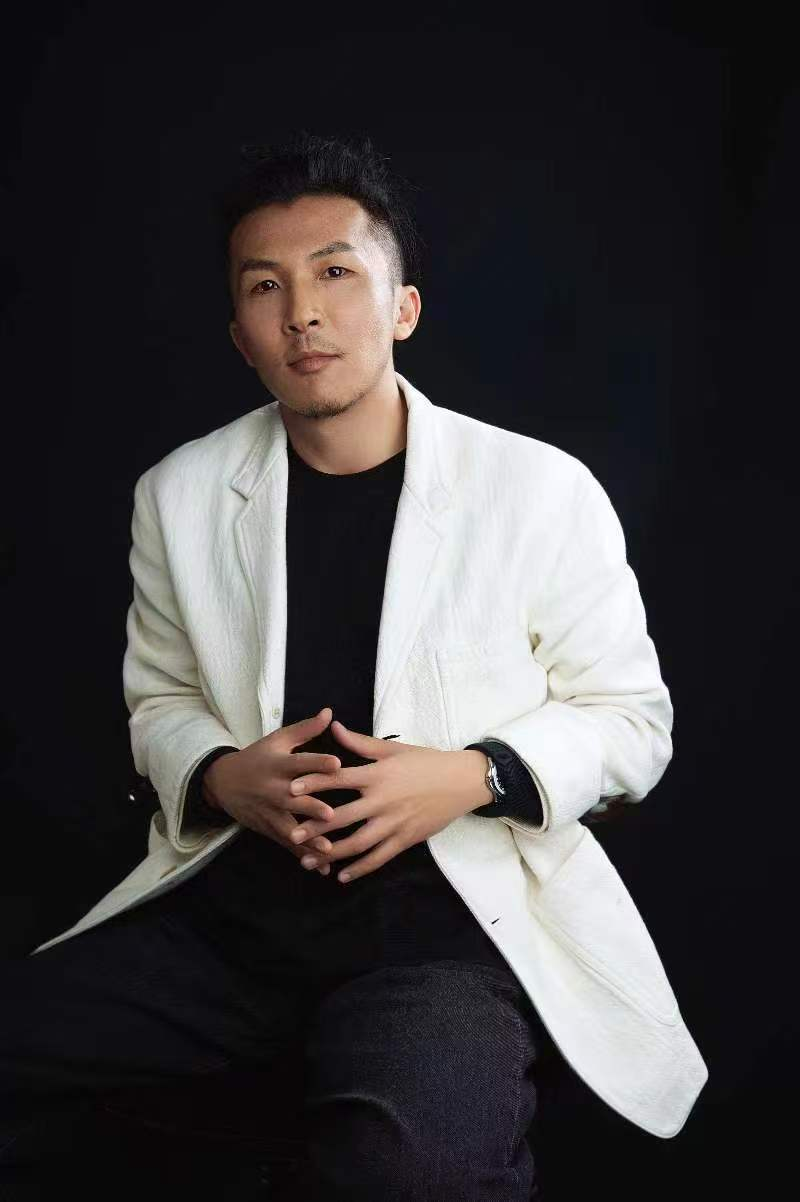
LEOW

LEOW (Chinese: 王点; pinyin: Wang Dian, born 1986) is a Chinese audiovisual artist and music producer from Shanghai. LEOW combines modern technology with Asian traditional culture in his work. He uses multimedia tools to create visual experiences.

== Early life and education ==
He studied classical music from a young age and later earned a master's degree in Data Science in the U.K., where he began combining data science with music production.

== Career ==
LEOW's early works Sunshine White Cube and OB Lab received awards in virtual audio-visual art projects in Italy and Tokyo. In 2021, LEOW founded the project "Asian Tribe". In 2022, LEOW showcased City Altar at the West Bund Art & Design Fair.

In 2022, his video art piece City Altar was exhibited at the West Bund Art & Design Fair. The same year, he held a solo audio-visual exhibition, Lighting the Stone Quarry, at Jinyun No.10 Quarry in Zhejiang Province.

In 2023, In 2023, LEOW collaborated on several projects, including visual production for Japanese music monk Kanho Yakushiji's China tour and the video art piece Tower. At the same year, his work Mrs Zhao's Hat was nominated in the Digital Audio-Visual Art category at the Berlin Video Festival. That year, LEOW also staged a series of immersive dance performances and outdoor audio-visual art installations in diverse locations, including Jinyun Quarry in Zhejiang, the Great Wall in Gansu, and venues such as Goldsmiths and Frameless in London.

In 2024, LEOW led his team in producing the dome-screen digital art exhibition Phantom of Yungang at the Yungang Grottoes. The project combined historical and cultural themes with modern digital projection techniques. Later that year, his work Art Triangle was exhibited at the 18th Hangzhou Cultural and Creative Industry Expo in October, and he designed a light and projection show at the ancient Great Wall in Gansu in November.

== Notable works ==
- Path of Stones (逐石)
- Fantasia (幻想曲)
- Lily (百合)

== Gallery ==
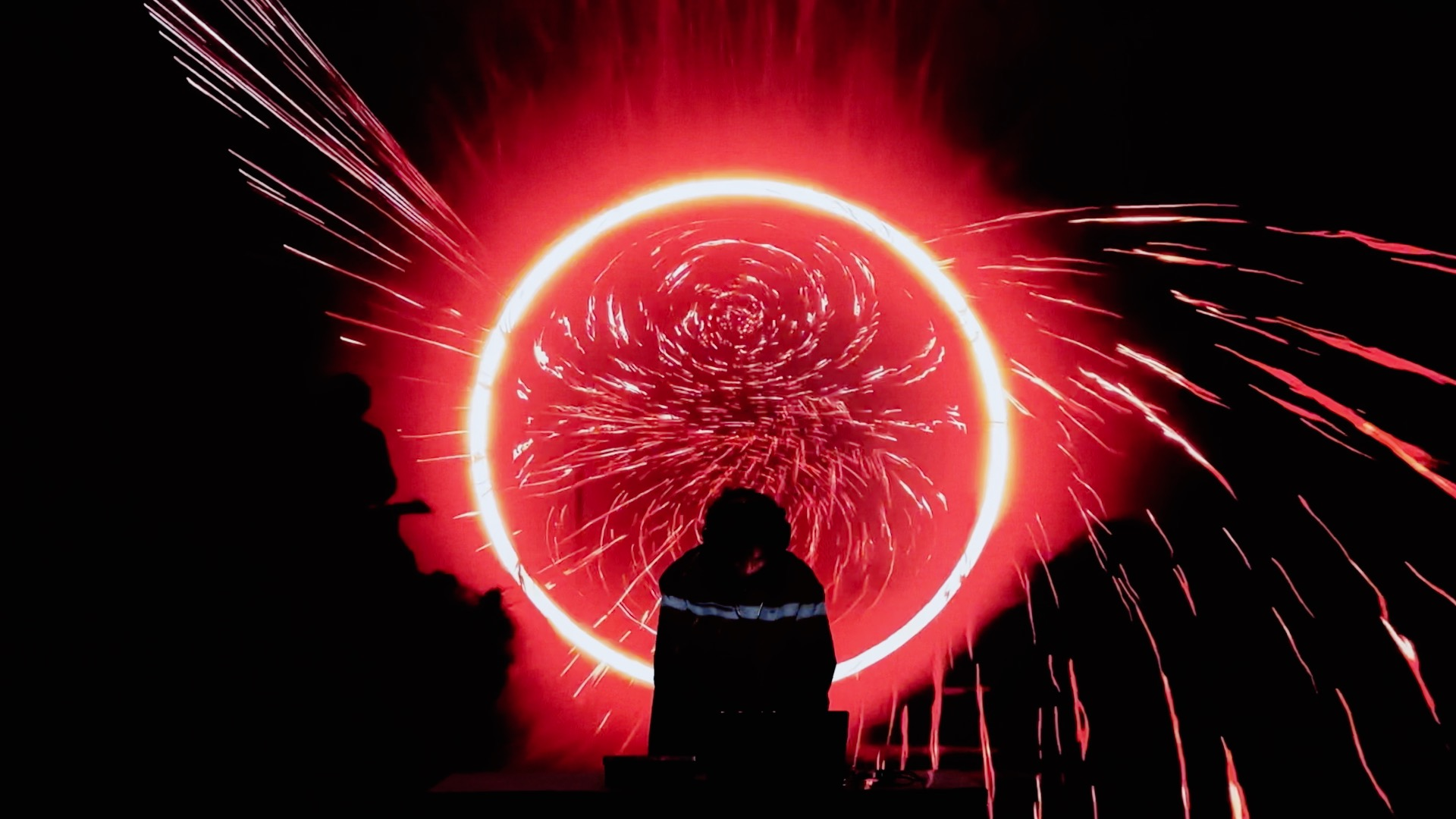

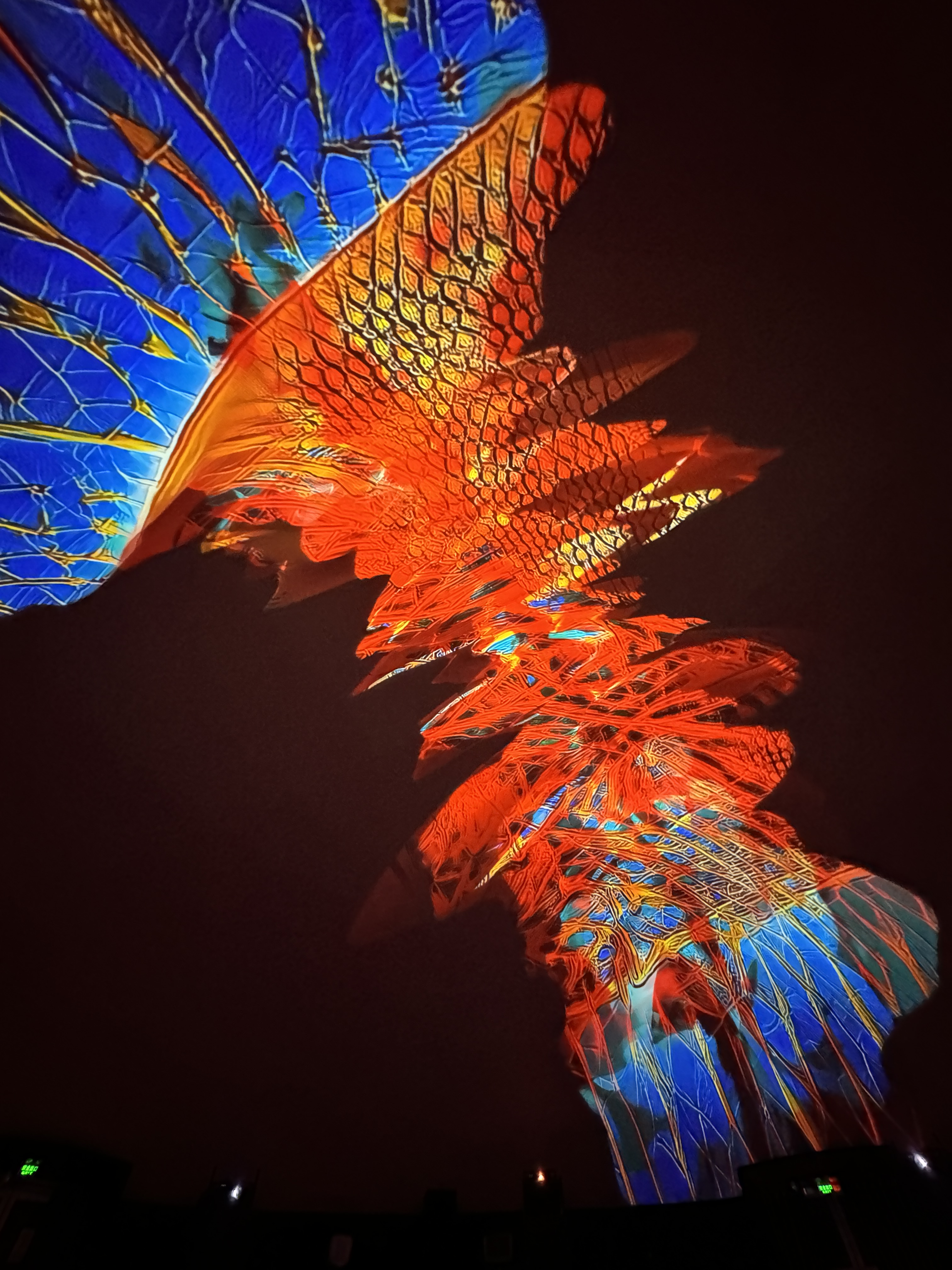

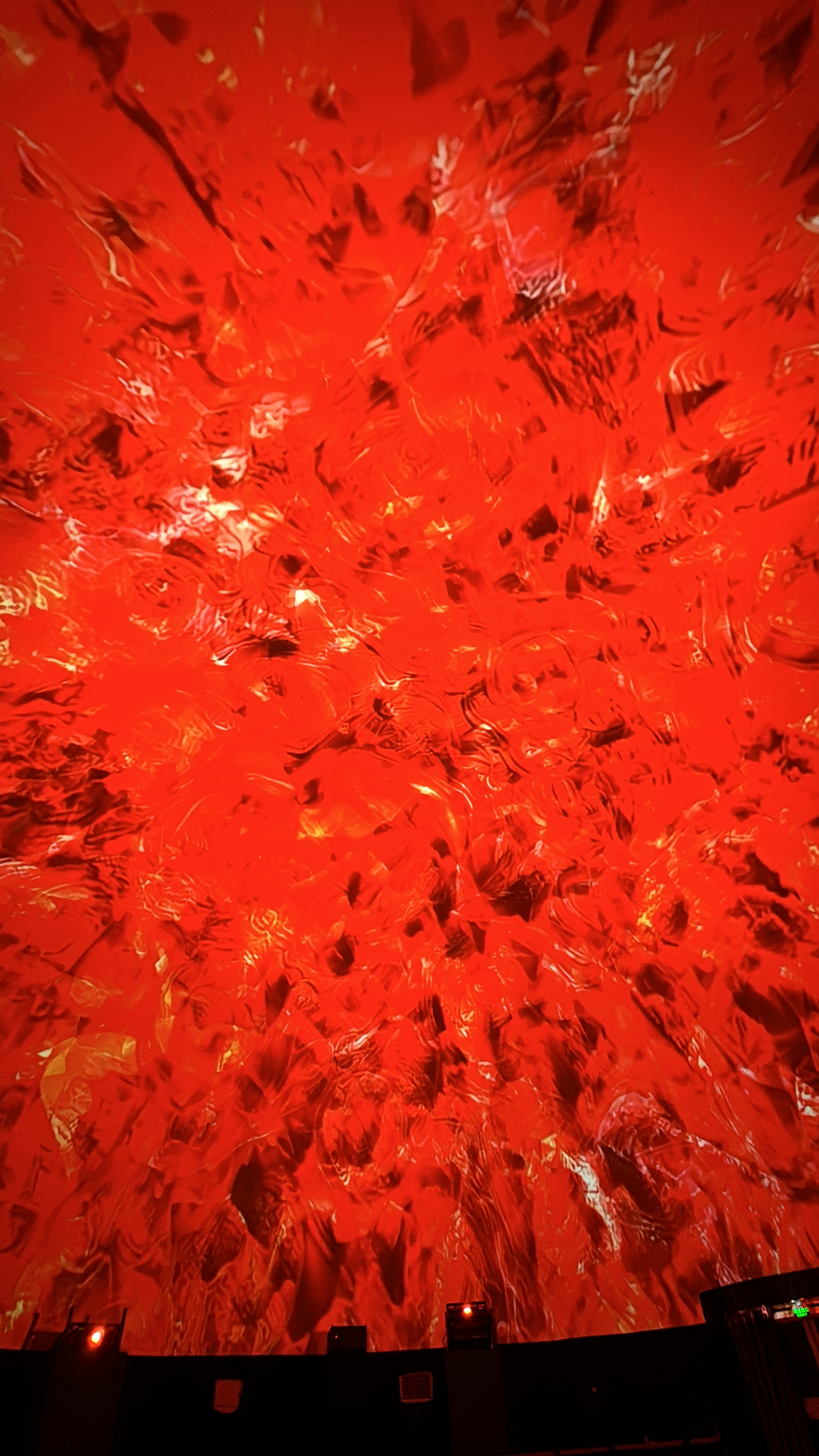

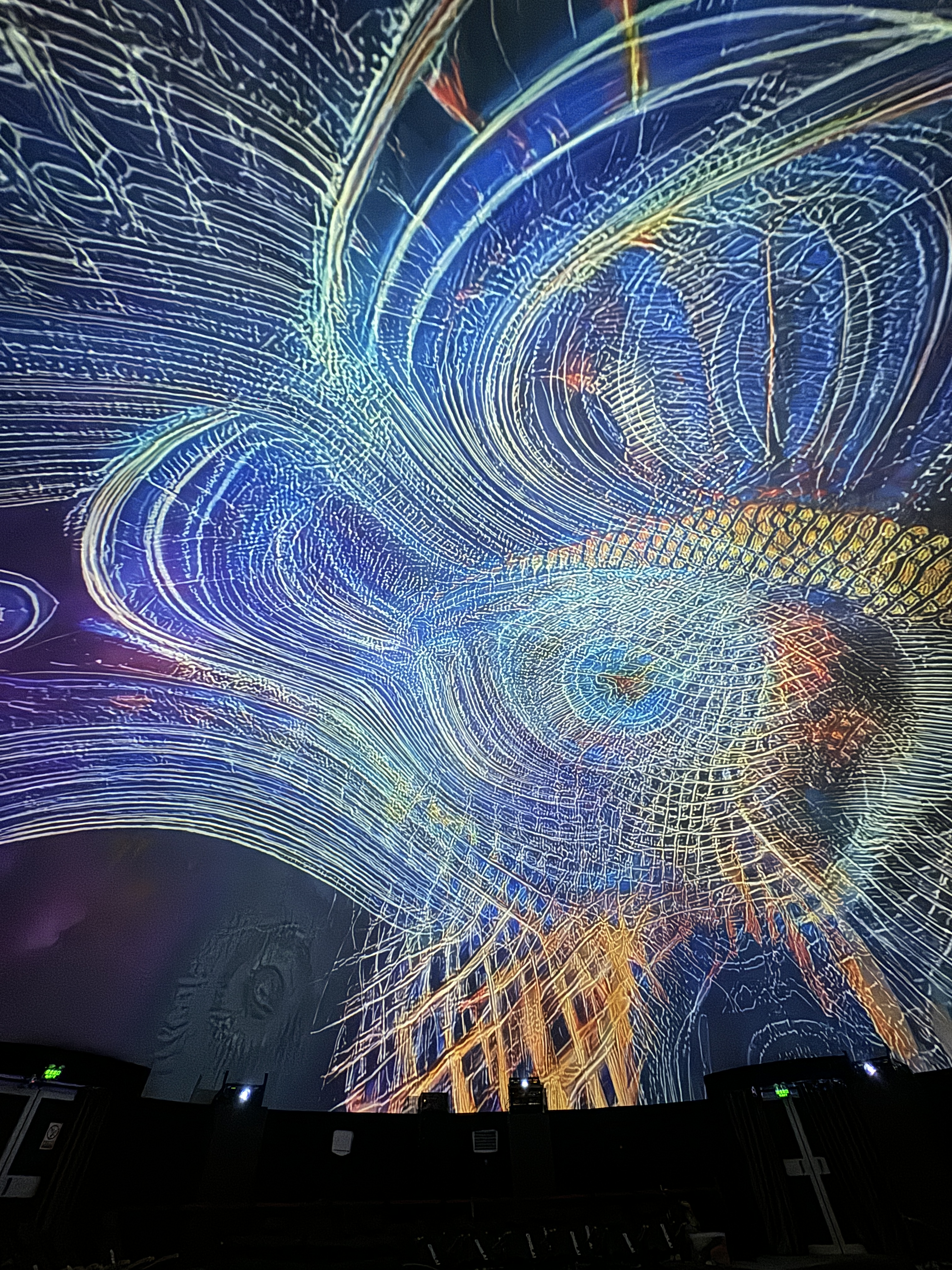

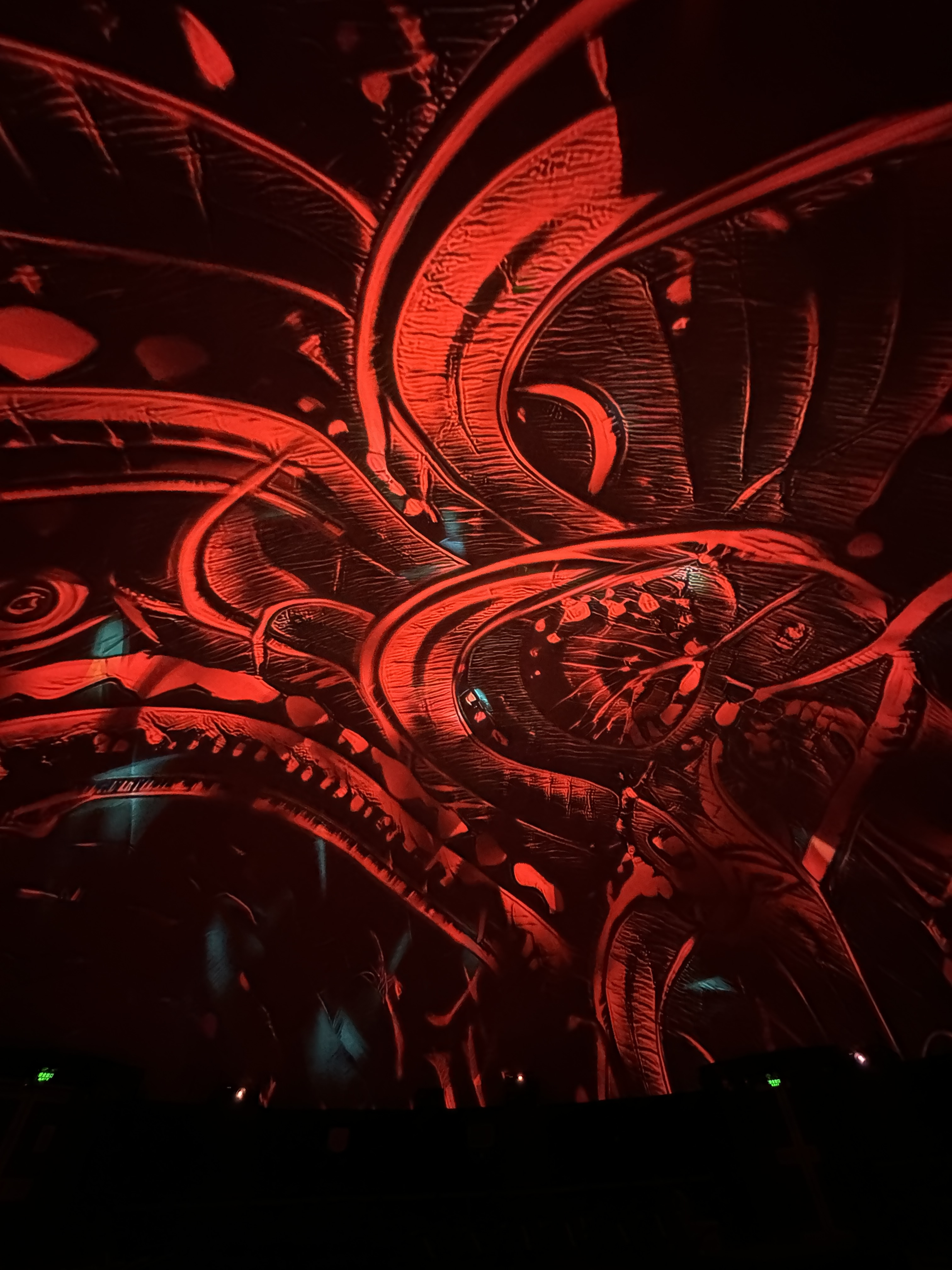
