= Jinyun railway station =

Railway station in Lishui, Zhejiang

Jinyun 缙云
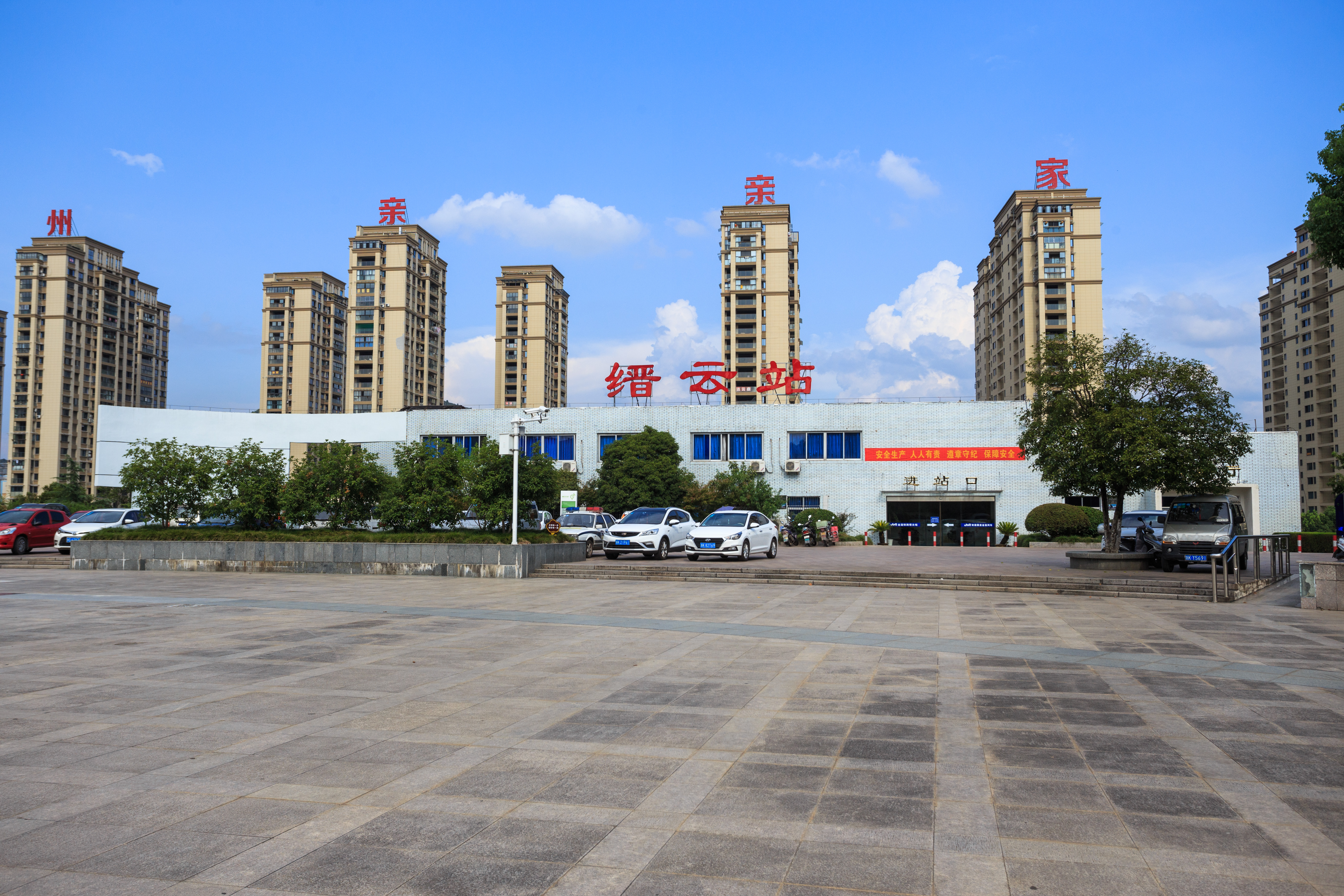

General information
- Location: Jinyun County, Lishui, Zhejiang; China
- Coordinates: 28°39′48.96″N 120°5′26.91″E
- Line: Jinhua–Wenzhou railway
Location

Jinyun railway station (Chinese: 缙云站) is a railway station in Jinyun County, Lishui, Zhejiang, China. It is an intermediate stop on the Jinhua–Wenzhou railway. It is used for both passengers and freight.

== See also ==
- Jinyun West railway station

Preceding station	China Railway	Following station
Yongkang South towards Jinhua	Jinhua–Wenzhou railway	Lishui towards Wenzhou
