= Pan'an County =

Pan'an 磐安县
- County
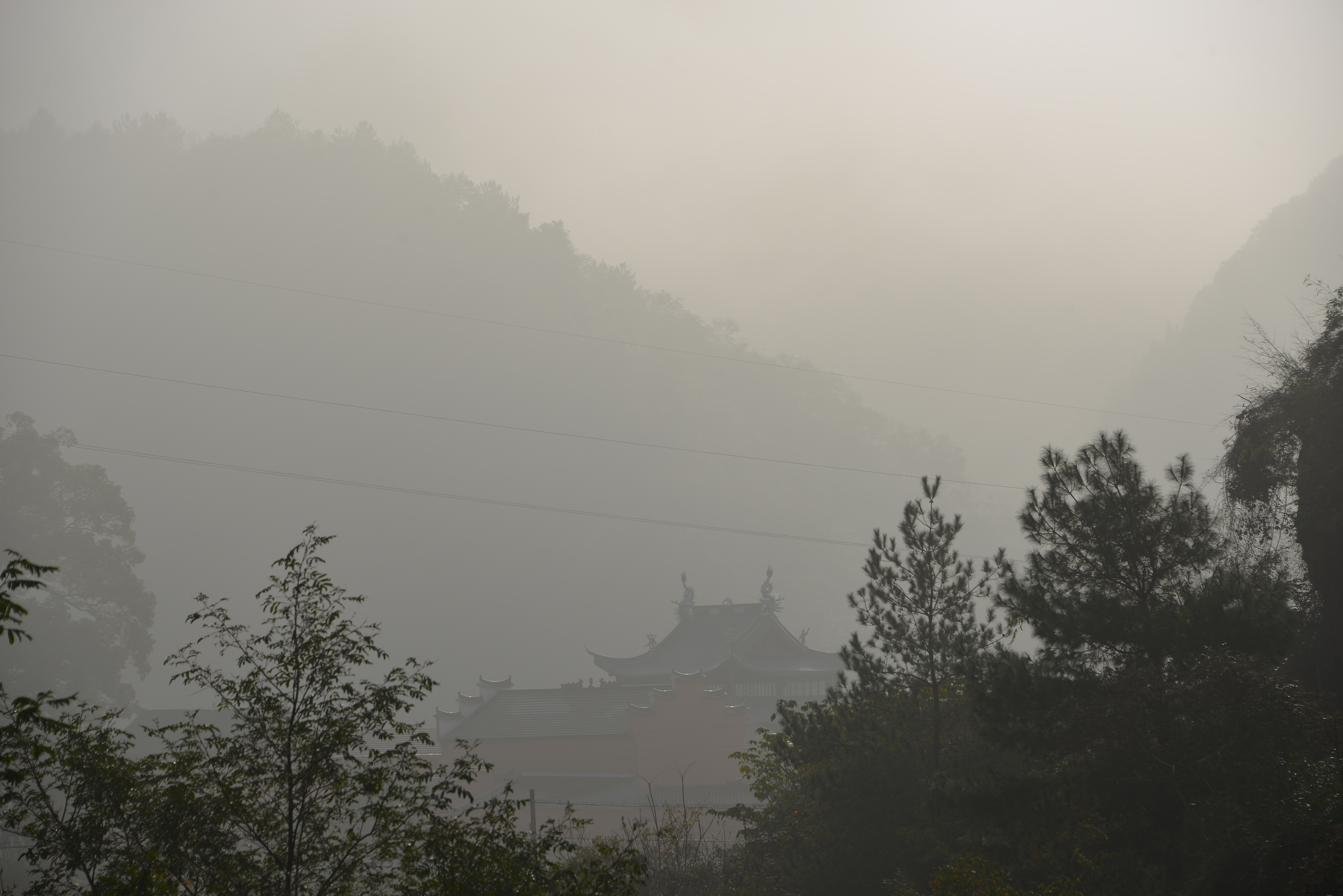

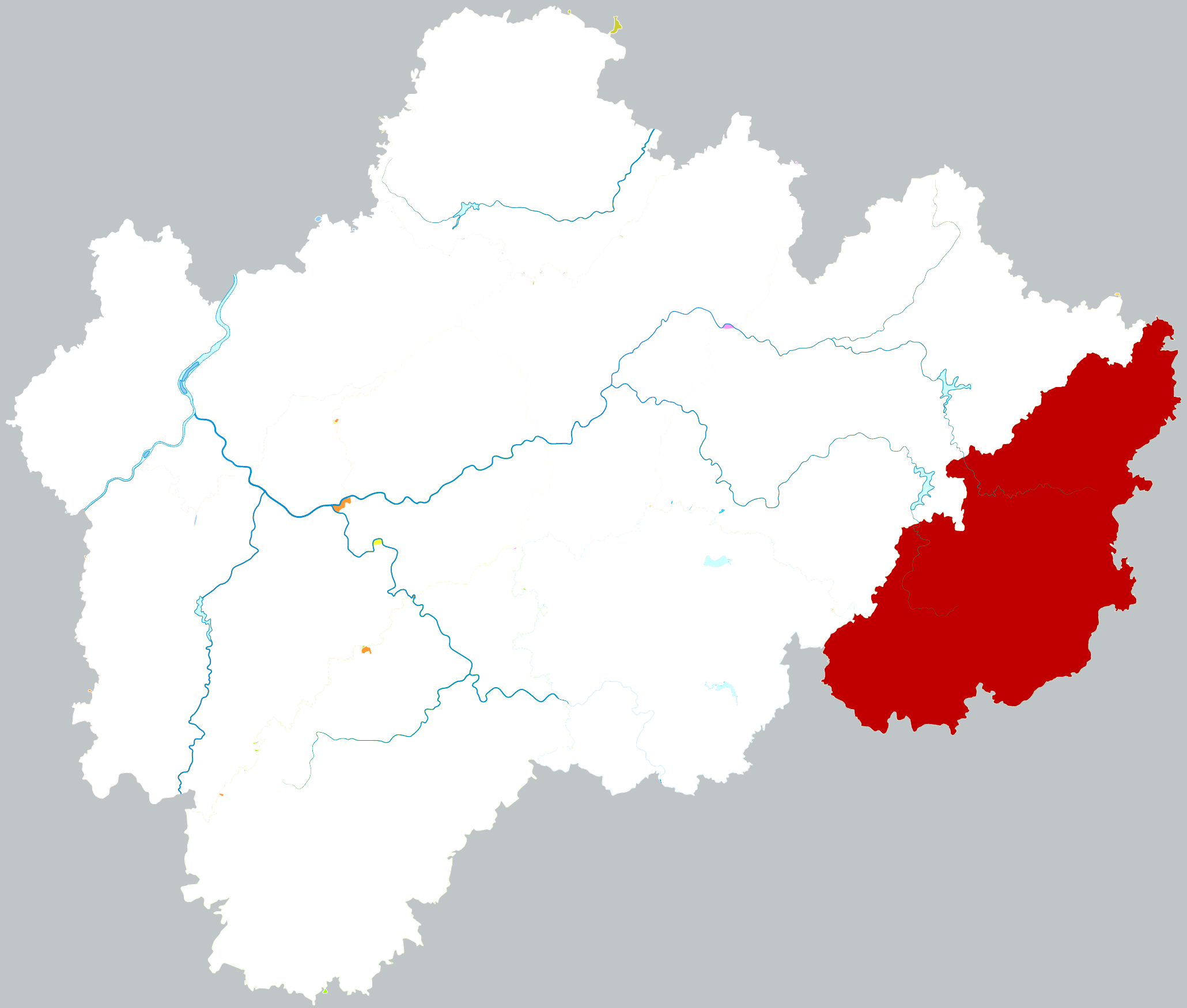
- Location of Pan'an County within Jinhua

- Location of the seat in Zhejiang
- Coordinates: 29°02′31″N 120°34′09″E
- Country: People's Republic of China
- Province: Zhejiang
- Prefecture-level city: Jinhua

Area
  - Total: 1,194.74 km^{2} (461.29 sq mi)

Population (2020)
  - Total: 177,161
- Time zone: UTC+8 (China Standard)

Pan'an County (Chinese: 磐安县; pinyin: Pán'ān Xiàn) is a county of central Zhejiang province, China. It is under the administration of the city of Jinhua.

== Administrative divisions ==
Towns:

- Anwen (安文镇), Shanghu (尚湖镇), Fangqian (方前镇), Xinwo (新渥镇), Jianshan (尖山镇), Yushan (玉山镇), Renchuan (仁川镇), Dapan (大盘镇), Lengshui (冷水镇)

Townships:

- Huzhai Township (胡宅乡), Yaochuan Township (窈川乡), Shuangxi Township (双溪乡), Shenze Township (深泽乡), Shuangfeng Township (双峰乡), Panfeng Township (盘峰乡), Weixin Township (维新乡), Gao'er Township (高二乡), Jiuhe Township (九和乡), Wancang Township (万苍乡)

== Transportation ==
Pan'an South railway station is on the Jinhua–Taizhou railway.
