= Yongkang railway station (Zhejiang) =

Railway station in Jinhua, Zhejiang

Yongkang 永康
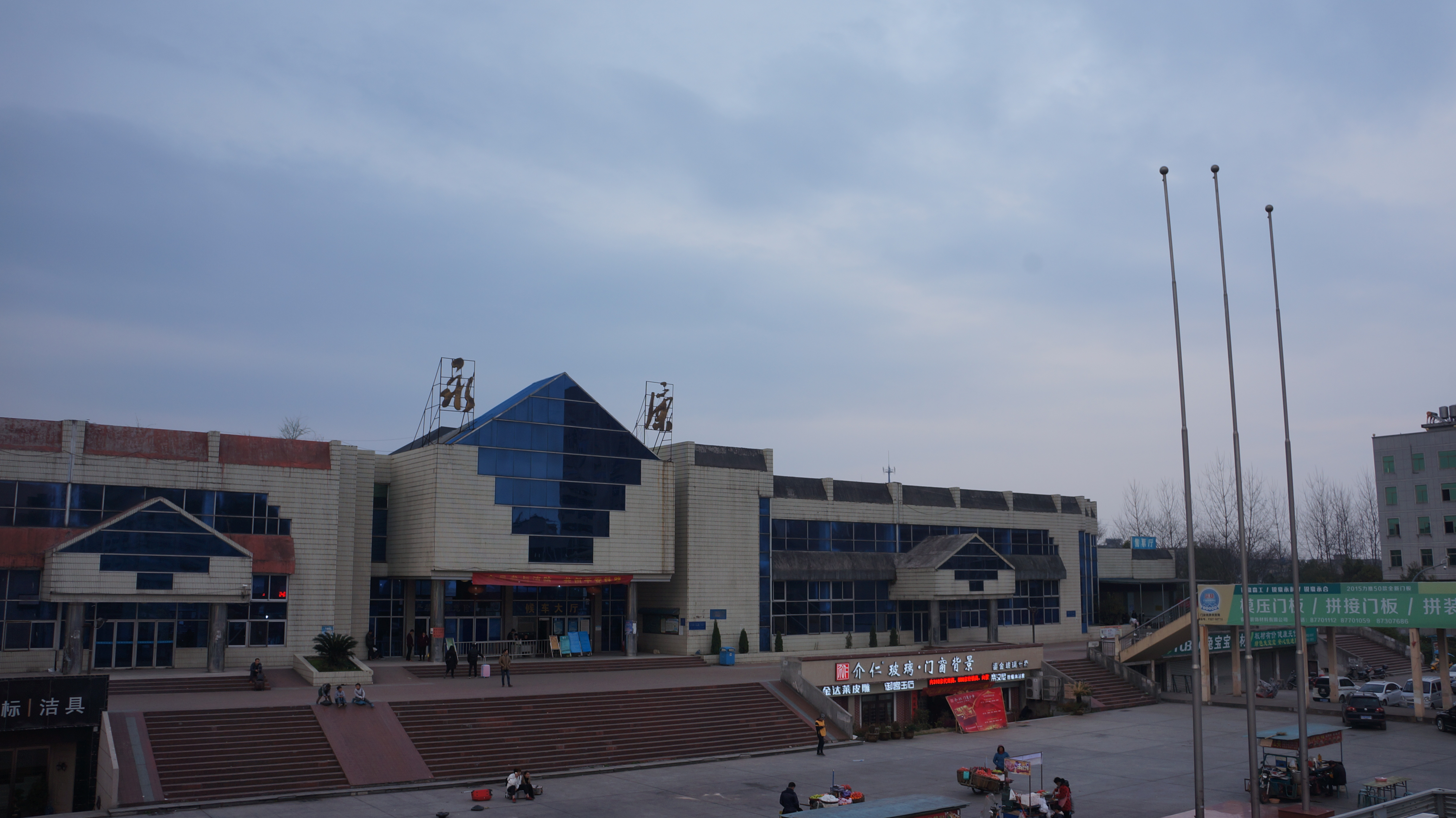

General information
- Location: Yongkang, Jinhua, Zhejiang; China
- Coordinates: 28.9124°N 120.0166°E
- Line(s): Jinhua–Wenzhou railway

History
- Opened: 21 April 1996
- Closed: 16 June 2021

Yongkang railway station (Chinese: 永康站) was a railway station in Yongkang, Jinhua, Zhejiang, China. It was used by both passengers and freight.

== History ==
The station opened on 21 April 1996. In April 2000, freight services were introduced. The station was closed on 16 June 2021 following a project to divert the Jinhua–Wenzhou railway away from the city centre and instead along the alignment of the Jinhua–Wenzhou high-speed railway. As a result, passenger services were moved to the existing Yongkang South railway station, while freight operations were moved to a newly-built station, Yongkang East.
