= Huzhen railway station =

Railway station in Lishui, Zhejiang

Huzhen 壶镇
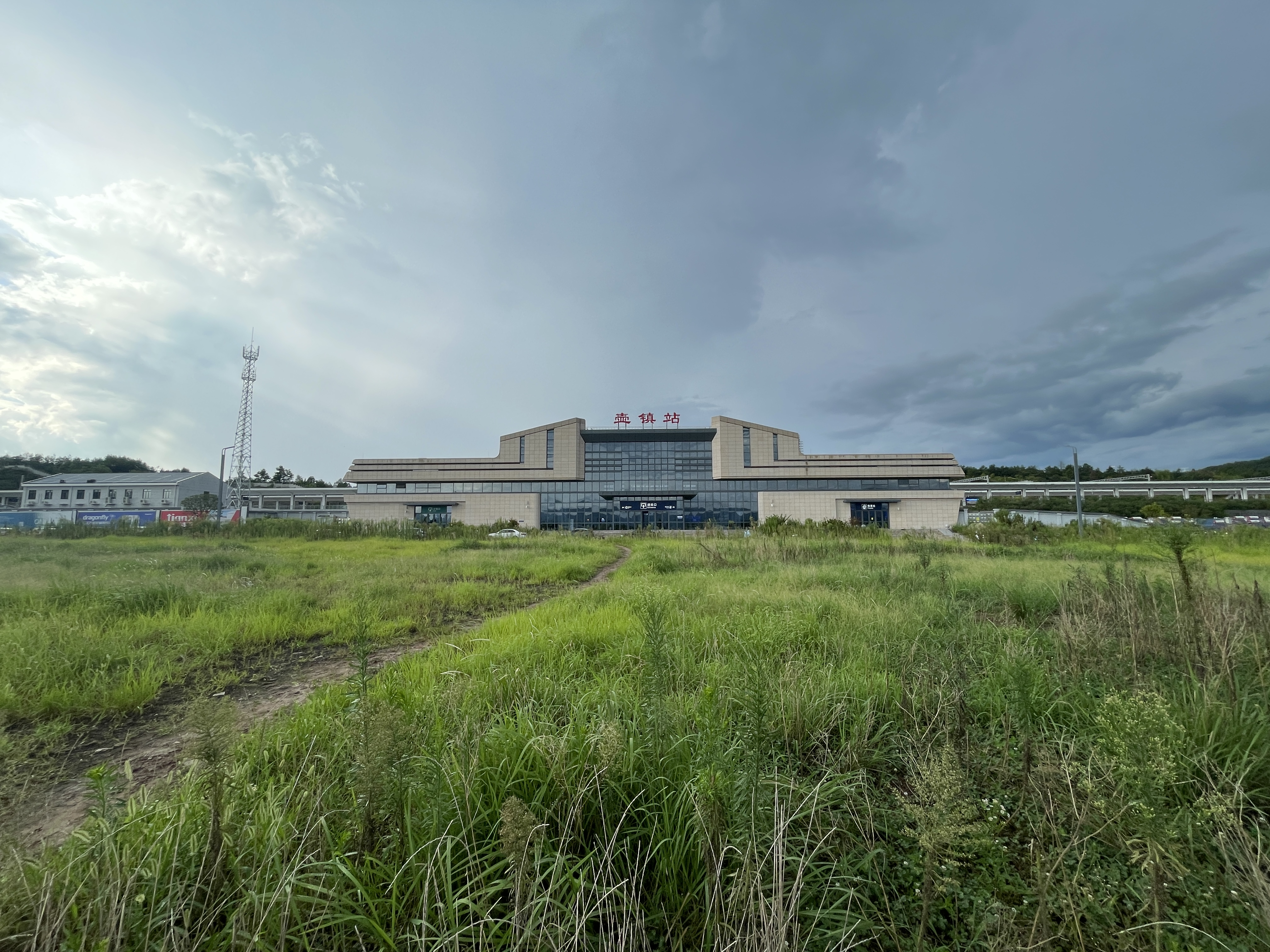

General information
- Location: Jinyun County, Lishui, Zhejiang; China
- Coordinates: 28°50′12″N 120°13′51″E
- Line: Jinhua–Taizhou railway
- Platforms: 2

History
- Opened: 25 June 2021
Location

Huzhen railway station (Chinese: 壶镇站; pinyin: Húzhèn zhàn) is a railway station in Jinyun County, Lishui, Zhejiang, China. It is situated to the north of the built up area of Huzhen and was built with the Jinhua–Taizhou railway. It opened with the line on 25 June 2021.

The station has two side platforms and two through tracks, and a siding for freight. There is a station building containing an enclosed waiting area to the south of the line.

Preceding station	China Railway	Following station
Yongkang South Terminus	Jinhua–Taizhou railway	Pan'an South towards Taizhou West
