= Yongkang railway station =

Yongkang railway station may refer to the following stations:

- Yongkang railway station (Taiwan)
- Yongkang railway station (Zhejiang)
