= Jinyun West railway station =

Railway station in Lishui, Zhejiang

Jinyun West 缙云西
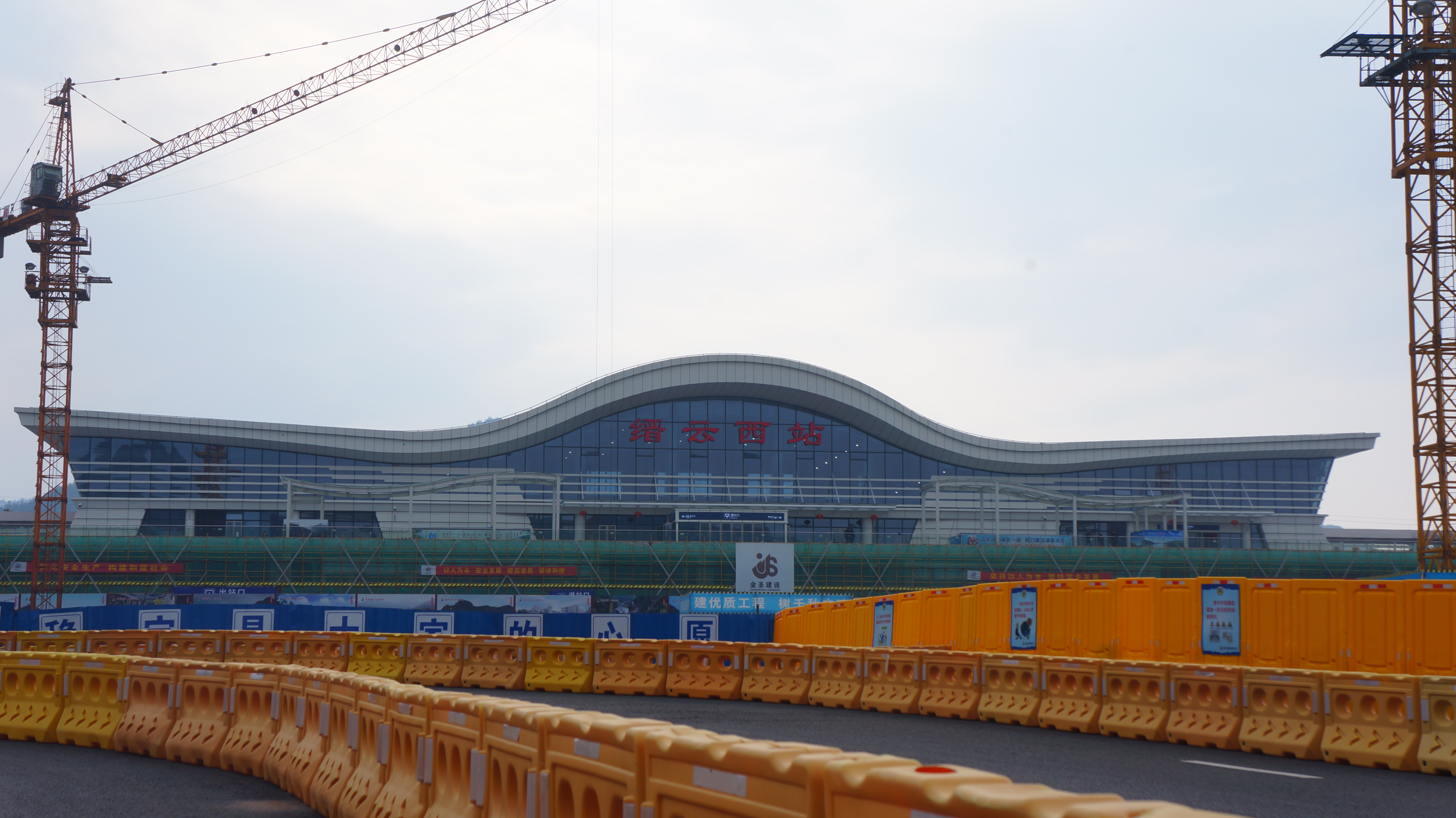

General information
- Location: Jinyun County, Lishui, Zhejiang; China
- Coordinates: 28°40′49.06″N 120°3′0.30″E
- Line: Jinhua–Wenzhou high-speed railway

History
- Opened: 26 December 2015
Location

Jinyun West railway station (Chinese: 缙云西站) is a railway station in Jinyun County, Lishui, Zhejiang, China. It is an intermediate stop on the Jinhua–Wenzhou high-speed railway. It opened with the line on 26 December 2015.

== See also ==
- Jinyun railway station

Preceding station	China Railway High-speed	Following station
Yongkang South towards Jinhua	Jinhua–Wenzhou high-speed railway	Lishui towards Wenzhou South
