= Xinjian, Zhejiang =

Xinjian 新建镇
- Town
- Location in Zhejiang
- Coordinates: 28°43′24″N 120°1′8″E
- Country: People's Republic of China
- Province: Zhejiang
- Prefecture-level city: Lishui
- County: Jinyun County
- Time zone: UTC+8 (China Standard)

Xinjian (Chinese: 新建; pinyin: Xīnjiàn) is a town in Jinyun County, Zhejiang province, China. As of 2018, it has 27 villages under its administration.

== See also ==
- List of township-level divisions of Zhejiang
