= Jinyun County =

Jinyun 缙云县
- County
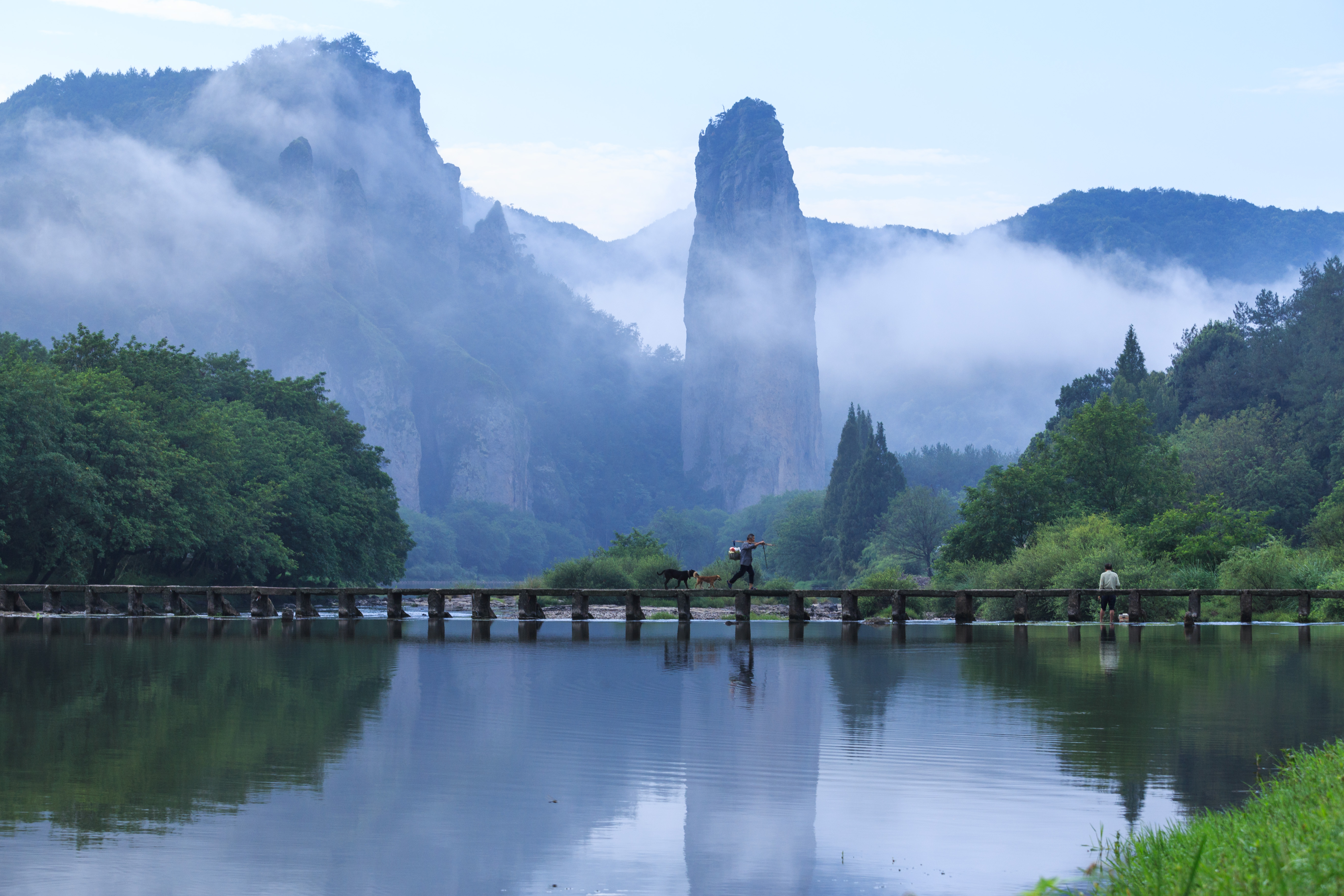
- Shiliang Bridge in front of Dinghu Peak in Xiandu Park

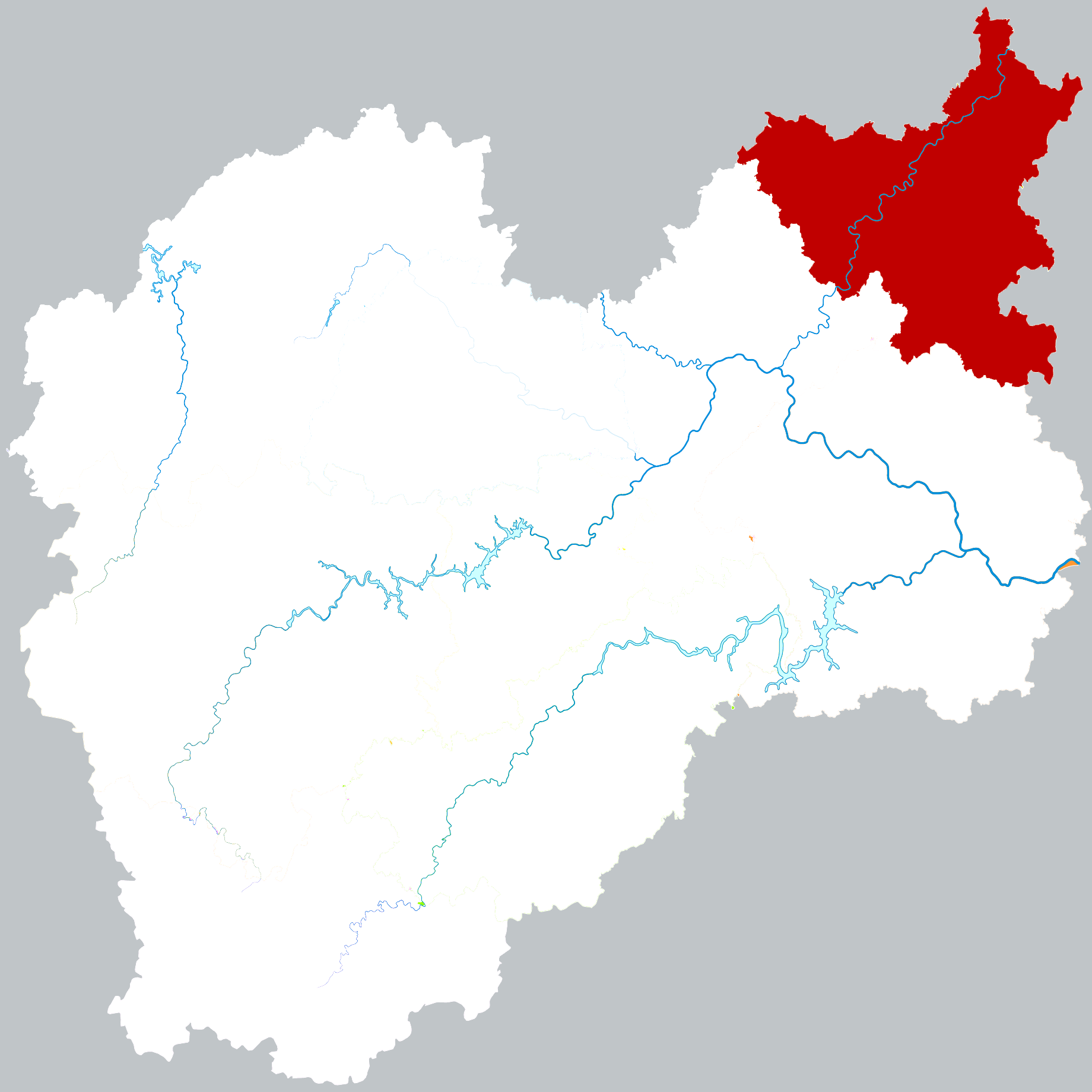
- Location of Jinyun County within Lishui

- Location of the seat in Zhejiang
- Coordinates: 28.65°N 120.05°E
- Country: People's Republic of China
- Province: Zhejiang
- Prefecture-level city: Lishui

Area
  - Total: 1,494.24 km^{2} (576.93 sq mi)

Population (2022)
  - Total: 405,000
- Time zone: UTC+8 (China Standard)

Jinyun County
- Traditional Chinese: 縉雲縣
- Simplified Chinese: 缙云县
- Postal: Tsinyun County
Transcriptions
Standard Mandarin
- Hanyu Pinyin: Jìnyún xiàn
- Wade–Giles: Chin-yün Hsien

Jinyun County is a county of south-central Zhejiang province, China. It is under the administration of the Lishui City.

== Administrative divisions ==
Towns:

- Wuyun (五云镇), Huzhen (壶镇镇), Xinjian (新建镇), Shuhong (舒洪镇), Dayuan (大源镇), Dongdu (东渡镇), Dongfang (东方镇), Dayang (大洋镇)

Townships:

- Rongjiang Township (溶江乡), Qili Township (七里乡), Huyuan Township (胡源乡), Nanxi Township (南溪乡), Sanxi Township (三溪乡), Qianlu Township (前路乡), Fangxi Township (方溪乡), Shijian Township (石笕乡), Shuangxikou Township (双溪口乡)

== Climate ==
Climate data for Jinyun, elevation 185 m (607 ft), (1991–2020 normals, extremes 1981–present)
Month	Jan	Feb	Mar	Apr	May	Jun	Jul	Aug	Sep	Oct	Nov	Dec	Year
Record high °C (°F)	28.3 (82.9)	30.1 (86.2)	33.7 (92.7)	35.4 (95.7)	38.7 (101.7)	38.4 (101.1)	41.4 (106.5)	41.7 (107.1)	40.1 (104.2)	35.4 (95.7)	33.6 (92.5)	26.1 (79.0)	41.7 (107.1)
Mean daily maximum °C (°F)	10.6 (51.1)	13.4 (56.1)	17.4 (63.3)	23.5 (74.3)	27.7 (81.9)	30.0 (86.0)	34.6 (94.3)	33.8 (92.8)	29.2 (84.6)	24.4 (75.9)	19.1 (66.4)	13.2 (55.8)	23.1 (73.5)
Daily mean °C (°F)	5.6 (42.1)	8.0 (46.4)	11.8 (53.2)	17.5 (63.5)	22.1 (71.8)	25.1 (77.2)	28.9 (84.0)	28.1 (82.6)	24.1 (75.4)	18.7 (65.7)	13.4 (56.1)	7.4 (45.3)	17.6 (63.6)
Mean daily minimum °C (°F)	2.3 (36.1)	4.3 (39.7)	7.8 (46.0)	13.0 (55.4)	17.8 (64.0)	21.5 (70.7)	24.5 (76.1)	24.1 (75.4)	20.4 (68.7)	14.7 (58.5)	9.5 (49.1)	3.6 (38.5)	13.6 (56.5)
Record low °C (°F)	−7.8 (18.0)	−6.8 (19.8)	−5.7 (21.7)	0.5 (32.9)	7.8 (46.0)	11.5 (52.7)	17.6 (63.7)	18.2 (64.8)	10.9 (51.6)	2.4 (36.3)	−3.8 (25.2)	−10.4 (13.3)	−10.4 (13.3)
Average precipitation mm (inches)	75.7 (2.98)	79.6 (3.13)	146.7 (5.78)	148.9 (5.86)	166.7 (6.56)	270.4 (10.65)	148.8 (5.86)	184.8 (7.28)	120.6 (4.75)	61.5 (2.42)	71.1 (2.80)	62.5 (2.46)	1,537.3 (60.53)
Average precipitation days (≥ 0.1 mm)	13.5	12.7	17.6	16.3	16.5	18.2	13.2	15.6	12.8	8.2	10.3	10.3	165.2
Average snowy days	3.3	2.7	0.7	0	0	0	0	0	0	0	0	1.4	8.1
Average relative humidity (%)	79	77	77	74	75	79	72	75	79	78	80	78	77
Mean monthly sunshine hours	89.7	92.3	104.2	126.8	134.9	116.5	212.3	194.5	141.1	140.5	110.2	111.4	1,574.4
Percentage possible sunshine	28	29	28	33	32	28	50	48	38	40	35	35	35
Source: China Meteorological Administrationall-time extreme temperatureall-time May low

== Transportation ==
Jinyun railway station is located on the Jinhua–Wenzhou railway. Jinyun West railway station is located on the Jinhua–Wenzhou high-speed railway. Huzhen railway station is located on the Jinhua–Taizhou railway.
