= Xijin Bridge =

Xijin Bridge 西津桥
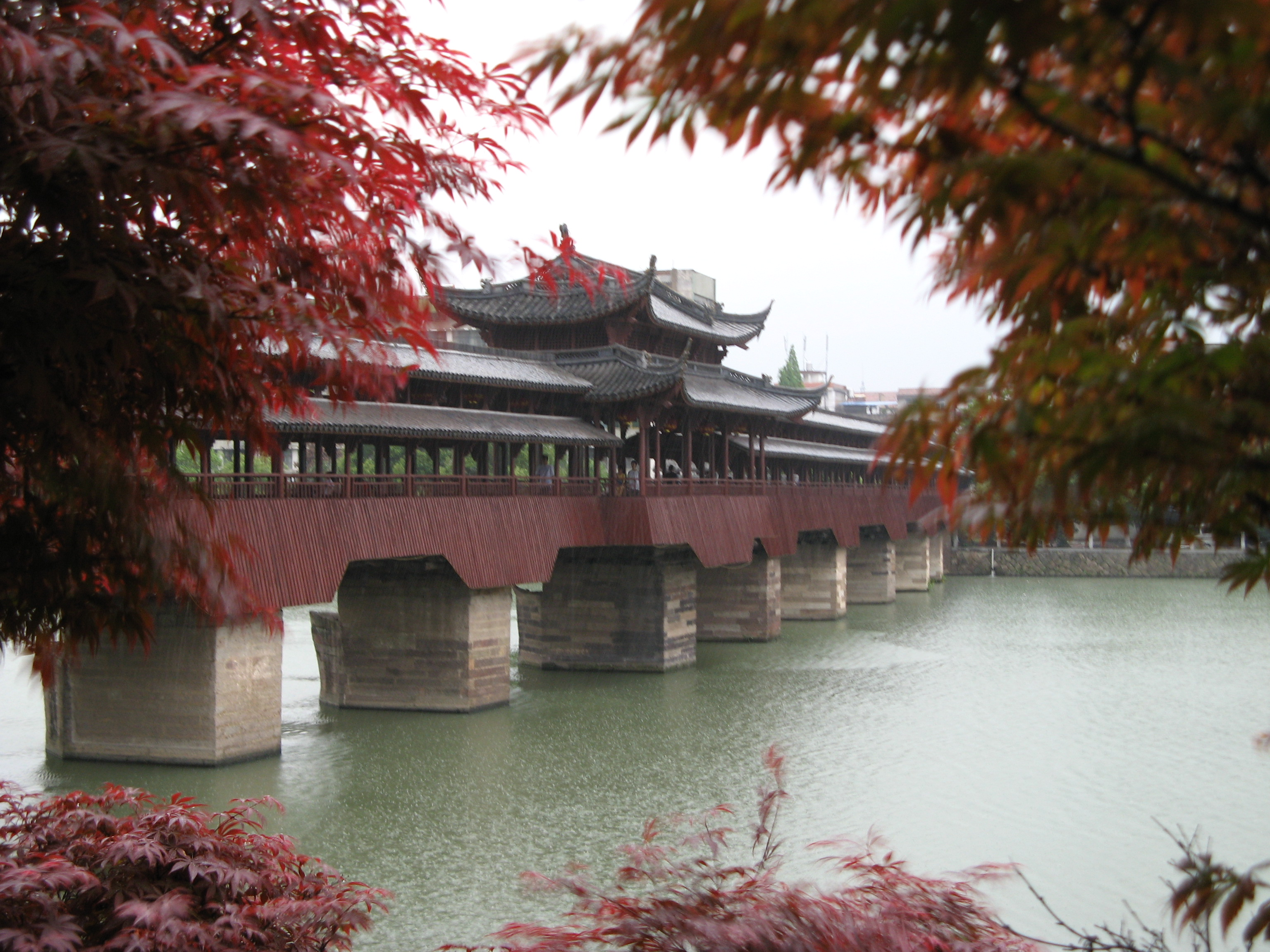
- Xijin Bridge in 2007
- Coordinates: 28°53′43″N 120°01′34″E
- Crosses: Yongkang River
- Locale: Yongkang, Jinhua, Zhejiang, China

Characteristics
- Design: Covered bridge
- Total length: 166 m (545 ft)
- No. of spans: 13

History
- Construction start: Ming dynasty (wooden); Qing dynasty (stone piers)
- Construction end: 1718

Location
- Interactive map of Xijin Bridge 西津桥

Xijin Bridge (simplified Chinese: 西津桥; traditional Chinese: 西津橋; pinyin: Xījīn Qiáo; lit. 'West Ferry Bridge') is an ancient Chinese covered bridge or lángqiáo (廊桥) located in Yongkang, Jinhua, Zhejiang Province, China. It is the largest covered bridge in Zhejiang Province, and one of the largest in China.

== History ==
The bridge was constructed during the Ming dynasty as a wooden bridge. In the 57th year of the Kangxi Era (1718), the bridge was rebuilt, and in the early period of the Yongzheng Era, the bridge's piers were replaced with stones to improve its load capacity. At the beginning of the Qianlong Era, the construction of the bridge was finished. During the Jiaqing Era, the bridge was repaired once and in the 12th year (1807), a stone stele (cenotaph) was erected to praise bridge builders and to summarize the history of the bridge. The inscription on the stele is known as Xijin Qiao Zhi (simplified Chinese: 西津桥志; traditional Chinese: 西津橋志; pinyin: Xī Jīn Qiáo Zhì; lit. 'the inscript of the Xijin Bridge').

== Structural parameters ==
The bridge is a mixed stone and wooden bridge; the piers are made of stone and its upper structures are mostly wooden. When it was a completely wooden bridge, it had a length of 206.3 meters distributed over 15 piers and 16 spans. After the piers were replaced with stone, it was changed to 12 piers and 13 spans and shortened to 166 meters. Each pier has a length of 5.6 meters, a width of 3.3 meters, and height of 4.6 meters. Between every two piers, there are 6 or 7 girders spanning the tops of piers. Each girder has an average length of 13 meters.

== See also ==
- Covered bridge
- Chengyang Bridge, another large lángqiáo (廊桥) in Guangxi, China
- List of bridges in China
