= Jinhua–Wenzhou high-speed railway =

Railway line in Zhejiang, China

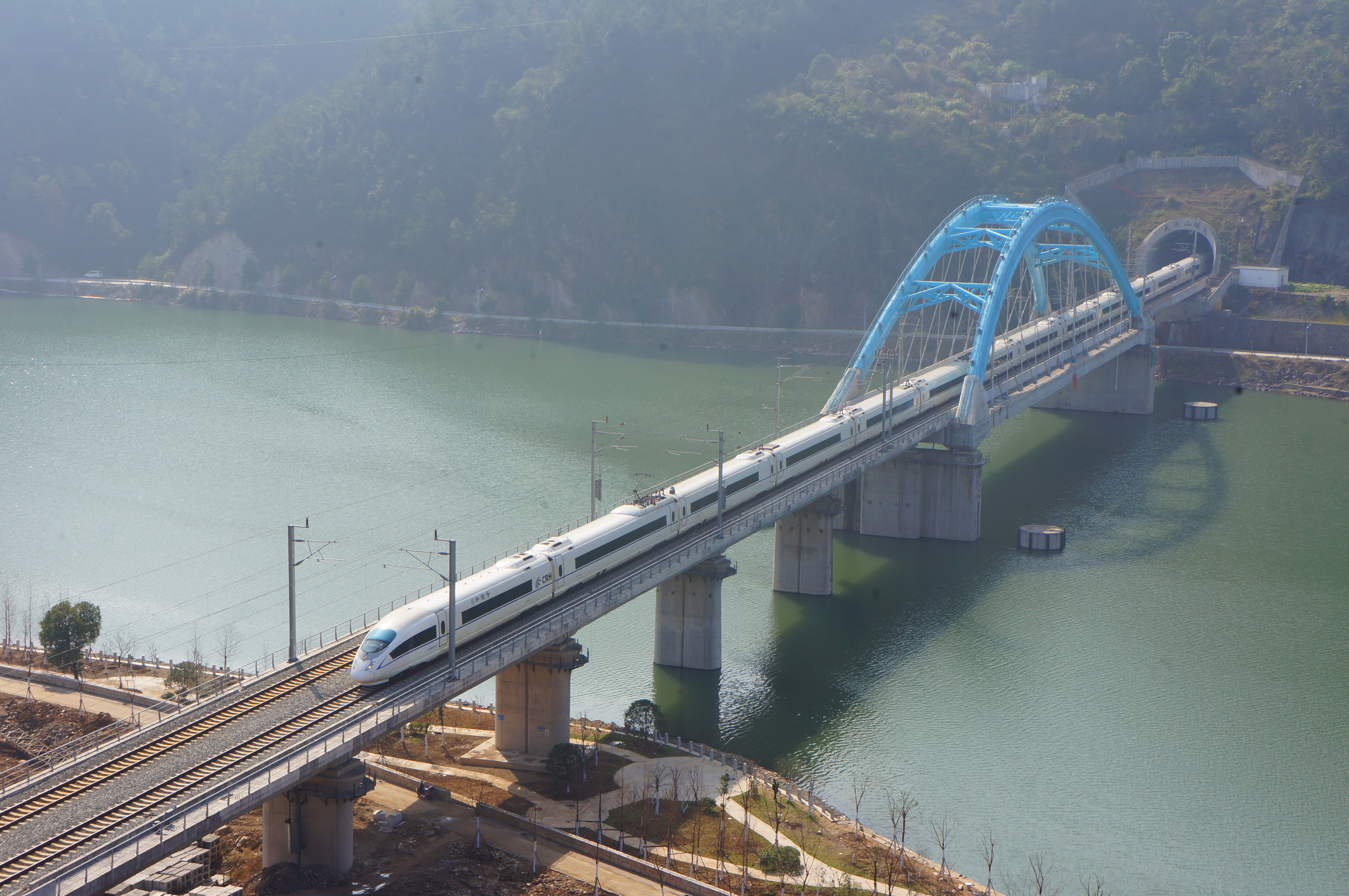
- A train passes Lishui Daxi River Bridge over Ou River

Overview
- Native name: 金温新双线
- Status: Operational
- Owner: CR Shanghai
- Locale: Jinhua and Wenzhou, Zhejiang province
- Termini: Jinhua; Wenzhou South

Service
- Type: High-speed rail
- System: China Railway High-speed
- Services: 1
- Operator(s): CR Shanghai

History
- Opened: December 26, 2015

Technical
- Line length: 188.366 km (117 mi)
- Number of tracks: 2 (Double-track)
- Track gauge: 1,435 mm (4 ft 8 1/2 in) standard gauge
- Electrification: 25 kV 50 Hz AC (Overhead line)
- Operating speed: 200 km/h (120 mph)

Jinhua–Wenzhou high-speed railway, also known as Jinhua–Lishui–Wenzhou high-speed railway as well as the Jinhua–Wenzhou railway expansion renovation project, is a high-speed railway operated by China Railway Shanghai Group in Zhejiang province. This line follows a similar route to the conventional Jinhua-Wenzhou Railway but has stations unique to this line. It connects the cities of Jinhua and Wenzhou, via Wuyi County, Yongkang, Jinyun County, Lishui, Qingtian County, Wenzhou's Ouhai and Lucheng District. It then connects the following railways Shanghai–Kunming high-speed railway's Hangzhou–Changsha section and Hangzhou–Fuzhou–Shenzhen high-speed railway's Ningbo–Taizhou–Wenzhou Railway and Wenzhou-Fuzhou Railway sections.

== Stations ==
- Jinhua South (Renovated)
- Wuyi North
- Yongkang South
- Jinyun West
- Lishui (Renovated)
- Chenzhuan
- Qingtian (Renovated)
- Wenzhou South

== Design and construction ==
This project was built as a double tracked electrified railway built to national level I standards. It has a route length of 188.366 km (117 mi) and a design speed of 250 km/h (155 mph) (but limited to 200 km/h (124 mph) operationally). It has a planned passenger transport capacity of 69 train pairs per day, equating to about 15 million passengers per year. A new service depot has also been constructed in Jinhua as part of this project to handle train maintenance. It has been built with a total investment of 17.97 billion yuan, as a joint venture between the now defunct Ministry of Railways and the Zhejiang provincial government. The construction period lasted four years, ending on October 15, 2015, when testing was commenced. The line was opened on December 26, 2015.
