= Renchuan =

Renchuan 仁川镇
- Town
- Location in Zhejiang
- Coordinates: 28°53′50″N 120°24′15″E
- Country: People's Republic of China
- Province: Zhejiang
- Prefecture-level city: Jinhua
- County: Pan'an
- Time zone: UTC+8 (China Standard)
- Postal code: 322300
- Area code: 0579

Renchuan (Chinese: 仁川; pinyin: Rénchuān) is a town in south-central Zhejiang province, China. It is under the administration and is in the south of Pan'an County. As of 2018, it has 28 villages under its administration.
