= Nigawa =

District in Hyōgo Prefecture, Japan

Nigawa (仁川, Nigawa) is a district along the Nigawa (river), which flows along the border of Takarazuka and Nishinomiya, in Hyōgo Prefecture, Japan.

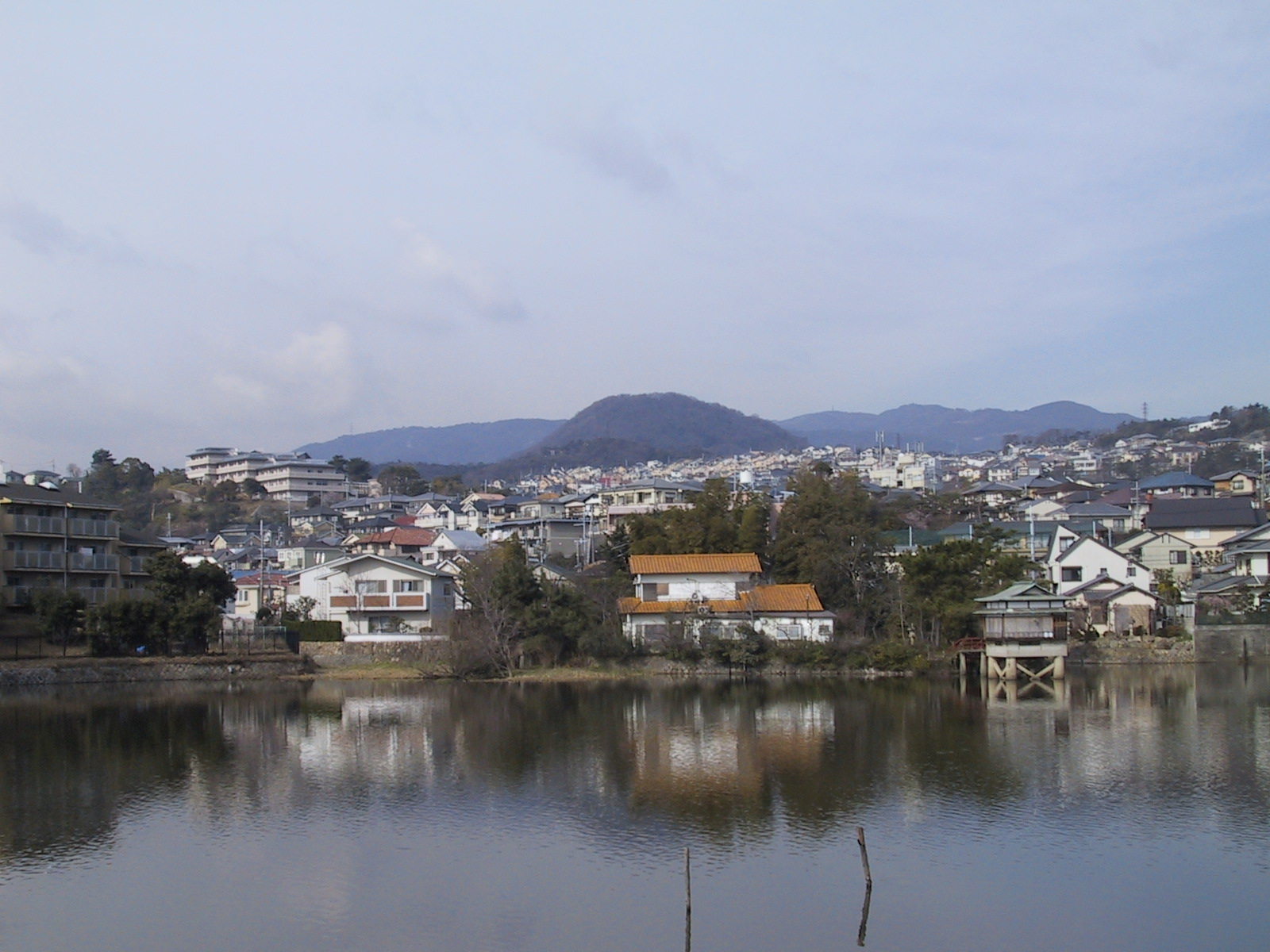
Nigawa District from Bentenike Pond

== Outline ==
Nigawa is one of the districts developed in the early stages of the development of the area along the Hankyu Imazu Line in the 1930s. This beautiful district has also been well known as a district where rich people, including presidents of major companies, sport managers and players, artists, or university professors in the Osaka Metropolitan Area live. However, during the Great Hanshin earthquake in 1995, this district was heavily damaged and the aging of the population has started to change the atmosphere around the district.

== Blocks ==
Nigawa district consists of the blocks as follows;

Nishinomiya City

- Nigawa 1-chome, 2-chome, 3-chome, 4-chome, 5-chome, 6-chome (仁川○丁目)
- Nigawa-cho (仁川町)
- Nigawa Gokayama-cho (仁川五ヶ山町)
- Nigawa Yurino-cho (仁川百合野町)

Takarazuka City

- Nigawa Kita 1 chome, 2 chome, 3 chome (仁川北○丁目)
- Nigawa Takadai 1-chome, 2-chome (仁川高台○丁目)
- Nigawa Takamaru 1-chome, 2-chome, 3-chome (仁川高丸○丁目)
- Nigawa Tsukimigaoka (仁川月見ヶ丘)
- Nigawa-dai (仁川台)
- Nigawa Asahigaoka (仁川旭ヶ丘)
- Nigawa-danchi (仁川団地)
- Nigawa Miyanishi-cho (仁川宮西町)

== Attractions ==
- Hanshin Racecourse – Near Nigawa but just outside of the district
- Bentenike Pond
- Mount Kabutoyama
- Kabutoyama Forest Park

== Shopping ==
- Sarara Nigawa
- OASIS Hankyu

== Education ==
- Takarazuka Daiichi Junior High School
- Nigawa Elementary School
- Nigawa Kindergarten (Takarazuka)
- Nigawa Kindergarten (Nishinomiya)
- Kurumi Kindergarten

== Access ==
- Nigawa Station

== Gallery ==
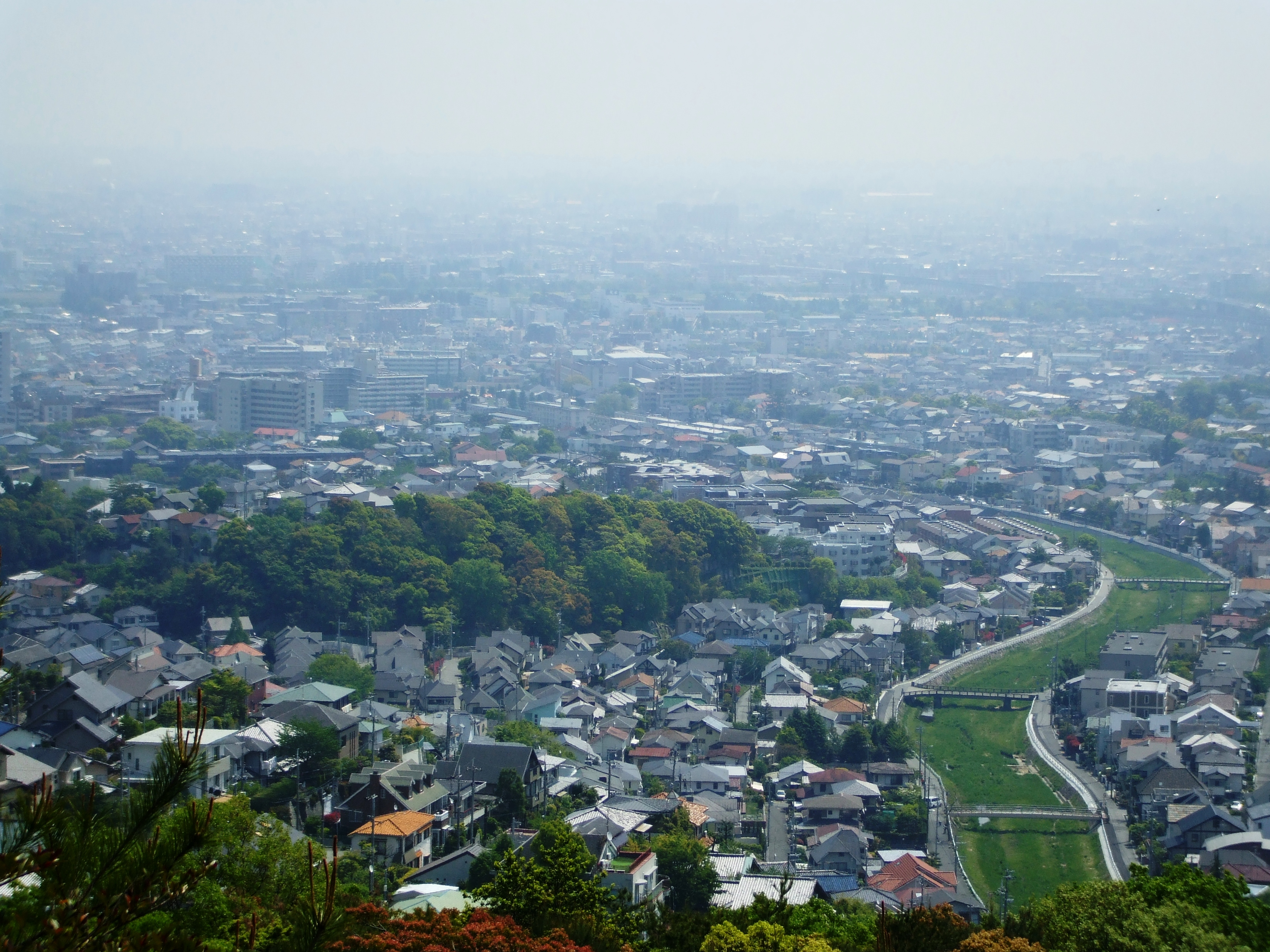
Nigawa District from Kabutoyama Forest Park (4/2009)

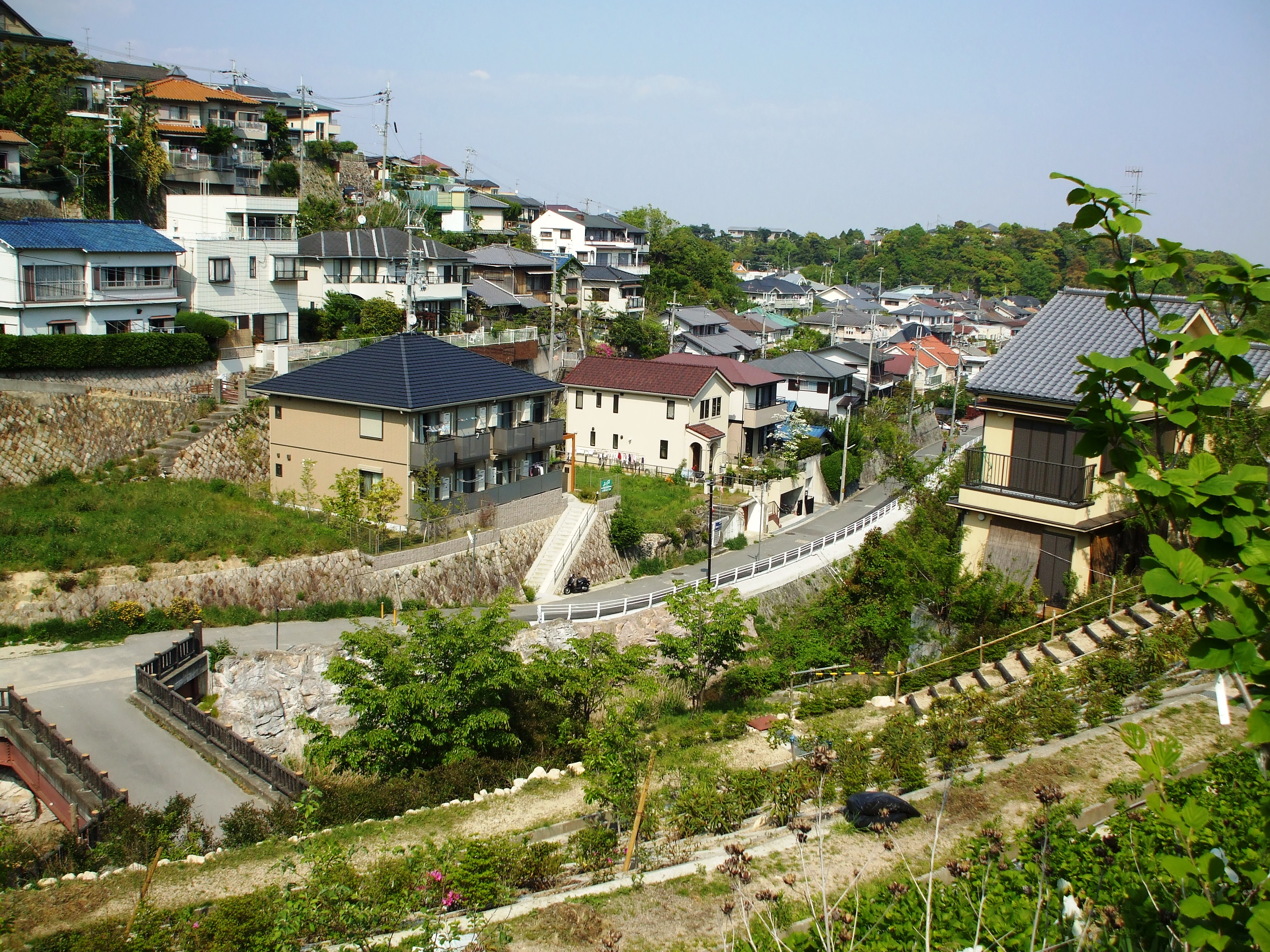
Upperside of Nigawa District (4/2009)

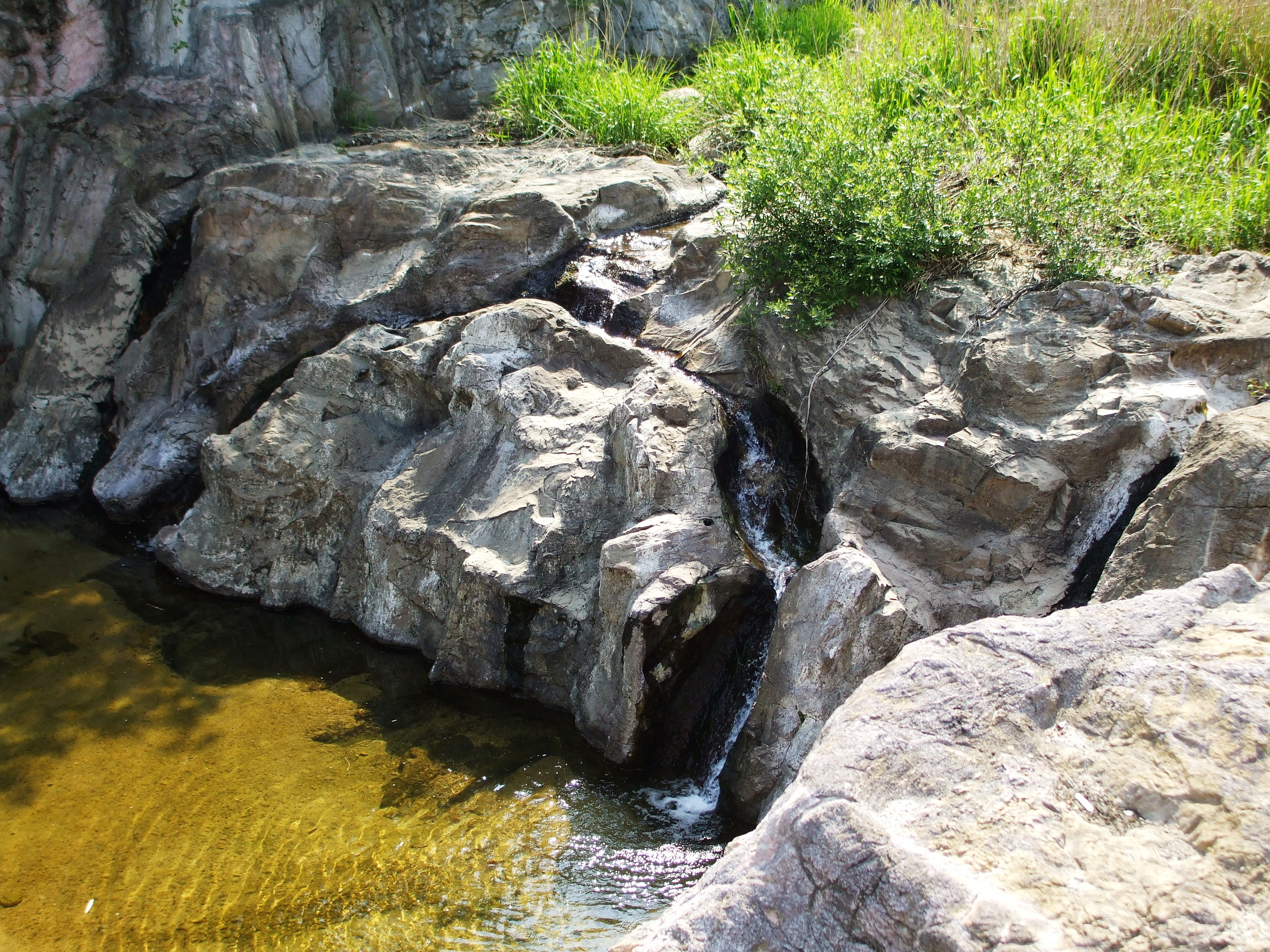
Nigawa River (4/2009)

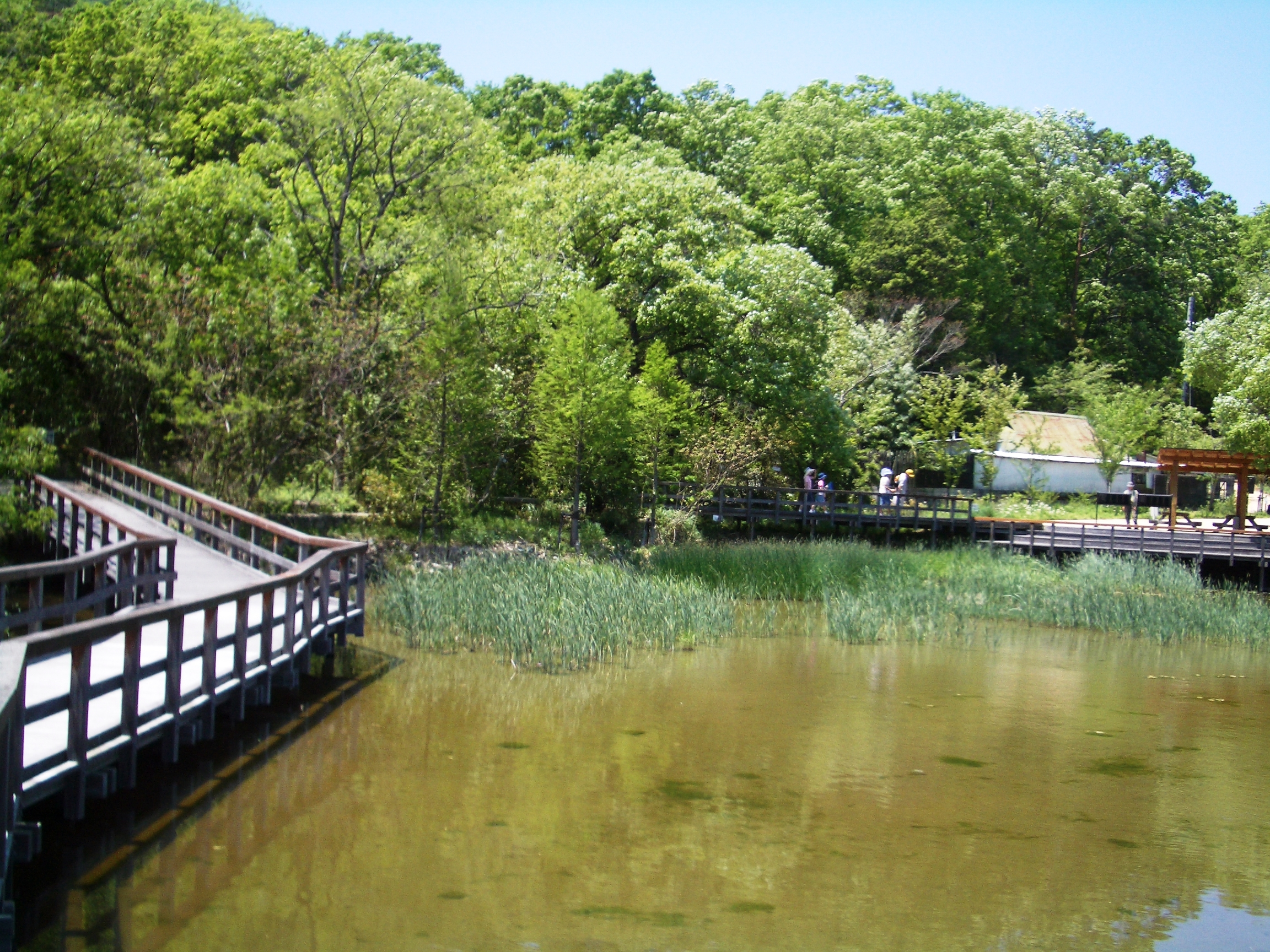
Nigawa Nature Park (5/2005)

== See also ==
- Nigawa landslide
