= Yongkang, Zhejiang =

City in China

Yongkang 永康市 Yungkang
- County-level city
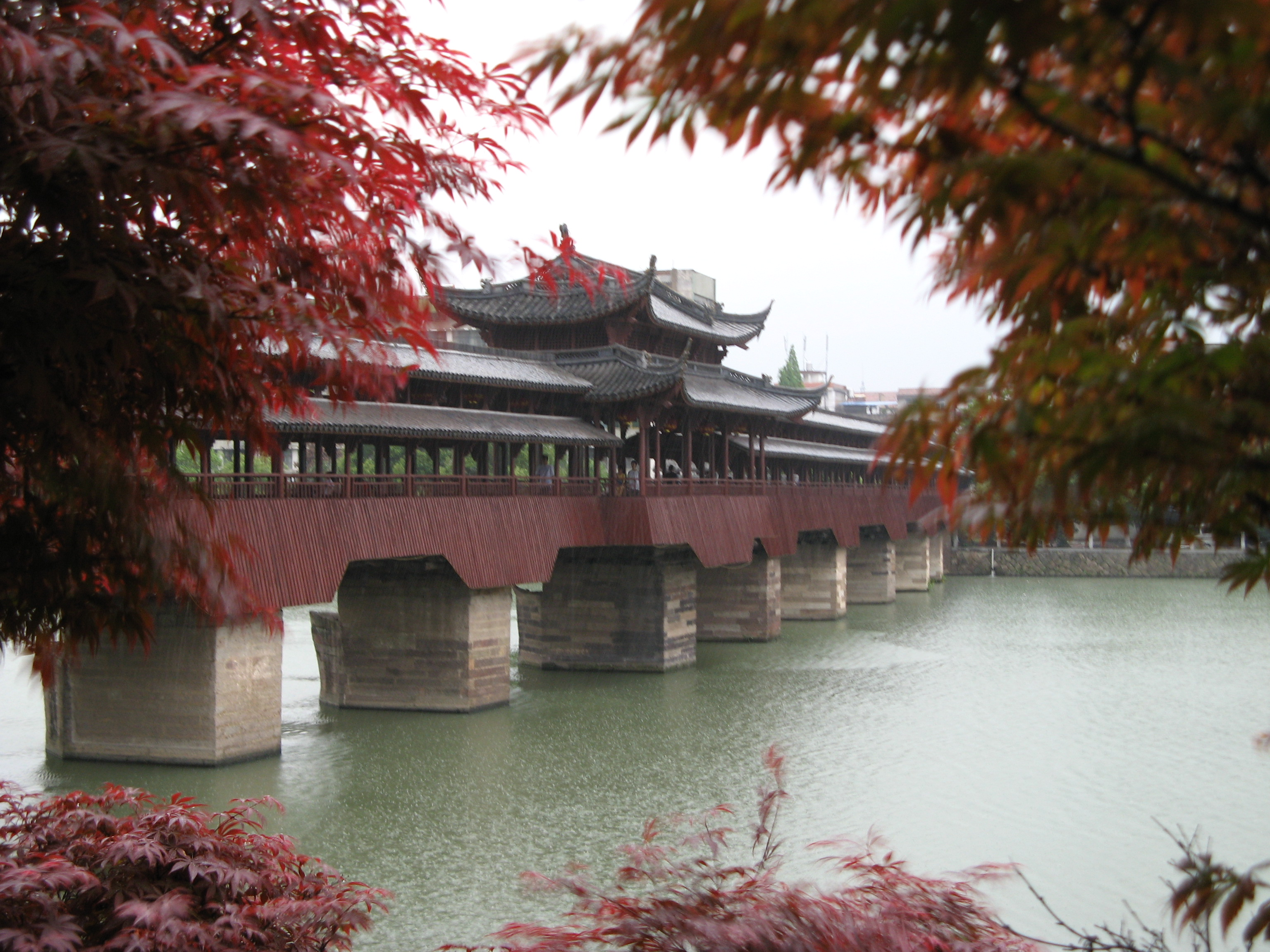
- Xijin Bridge

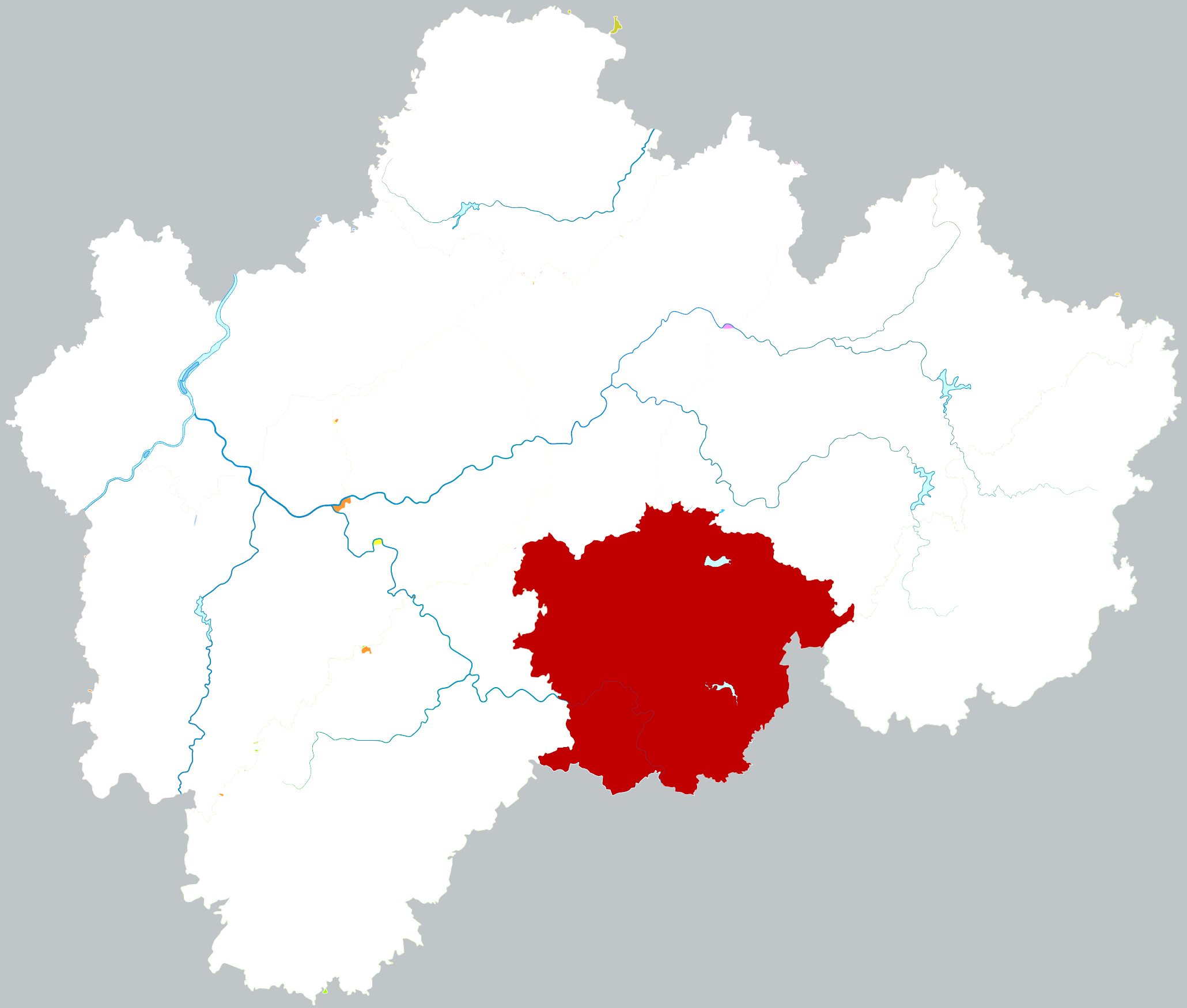
- Location of Yongkang City within Jinhua

- Location in Zhejiang
- Coordinates: 28°54′N 120°02′E
- Country: People's Republic of China
- Province: Zhejiang
- Prefecture-level city: Jinhua

Area
  - County-level city: 1,046.02 km^{2} (403.87 sq mi)
  - Urban: 1,046.02 km^{2} (403.87 sq mi)
  - Metro: 2,610.12 km^{2} (1,007.77 sq mi)

Population (2020 census)
  - County-level city: 964,203
  - Density: 921.783/km^{2} (2,387.41/sq mi)
  - Urban: 964,203
  - Urban density: 921.783/km^{2} (2,387.41/sq mi)
  - Metro: 1,426,665
  - Metro density: 546.590/km^{2} (1,415.66/sq mi)
- Time zone: UTC+8 (China Standard)
- Postal code: 321300
- Area code: 0579
- Website: http://www.yk.gov.cn/

Yongkang (Chinese: 永康; pinyin: Yǒngkāng), formerly known as Lizhou (Chinese: 丽州; pinyin: Lìzhōu), is a county-level city located in the central part of Zhejiang, in the People's Republic of China. It is southeast of the Jinhua City boundary and approximately 180 km (111.8 mi) from Hangzhou. It has an area of 1,049 km^{2} (405 sq mi) and a population of 964,203 as of the 2020 census, including more than 100,000 non-resident workers. According to a 2010 census, its built-up (or metro) area of Yongkang City and Wuyi County was home to 1,426,659 inhabitants. Yongkang is known as the "hardware capital of China."

== History ==
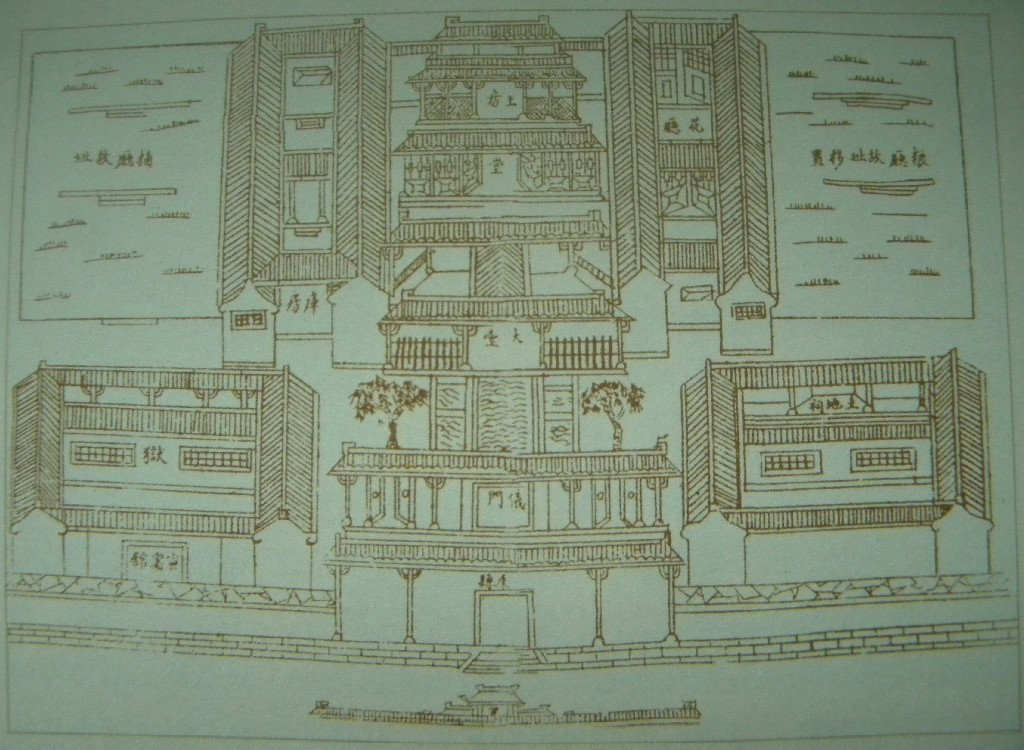
A map of the Yongkang government building during the Qing dynasty

The Chinese name Yongkang means "eternal well-being." The city was formally established in 245 CE in the Wu Kingdom, during the Three Kingdoms (220–280 CE) period. In the last two decades, the city has become known for both its aggressive promotion of tourism and its booming hardware manufacturing industry. It is widely considered "the hardware capital of China," though Shenzhen has also been given the title. In 2003, Yongkang's GDP ranked 47th out of over one thousand counties nationwide.

Lizhou was the ancient name of Yongkang. According to legend, when the mother of Sun Quan, the King of Wu, was ill, she went on a pilgrimage to pray for "eternal well-being" at a temple in Lizhou. After she recovered, Sun Quan was very pleased and named the area Yongkang ("eternal well-being") after her speedy recovery. At that time, it was a part of Wushang City; however, during the Tang dynasty, Yongkang was independently recognized under the name Lizhou, eventually becoming the general administrative area of Yue Prefecture.

In 1992, the State Council approved Yongkang as a county-level city.

== Administrative divisions ==
Subdistricts:

- Dongcheng Subdistrict (东城街道)
- Xicheng Subdistrict (西城街道)
- Jiangnan Subdistrict (江南街道)

Towns:

- Zhiying (芝英镇)
- Shizhu (石柱镇)
- Gushan (古山镇)
- Xiangzhu (象珠镇)
- Longshan (龙山镇)
- Huajie (花街镇)
- Qiancang (前仓镇)
- Zhoushan (舟山镇)
- Fangyan (方岩镇)
- Xixi (西溪镇)
- Tangxuan (唐先镇)

== Economy ==
Since ancient times, Yongkang has been known for its hardware production. After 30 years of reform and modernization, Yongkang evolved from traditional to modern hardware, accelerating the pace of industrial upgrading and product branding. The county then became known domestically and abroad as a "hardware capital."

The city of Yongkang has always enjoyed the name "City of Metals," as metals and machinery are its flagship industry. Other industries in the city have grown consistently, including the production of electric tools, building materials, and automobile/motorcycle accessories. Additionally, the city is a national base for the production of anti-theft doors, electric bicycles, scooters, and thermal cups.

Due to fears of industrial theft, the Yongkang door industry, which has maintained its growth since 1997, has now become the eighth-largest Yongkang hardware industry. It has 454 enterprise portal products and produces four anti-theft doors every day, accounting for 1% of the national output of anti-theft doors. 52% of the national output of stainless steel tableware and 45% of the national output of the daily-use weighing apparatus come from Yongkang, along with a third of the national output of power tools. Packaging drums, non-slip case scales and other products accounted for more than 90% of the domestic market. Scooters, gas stove burners, pumps and saw blades are its primary exports.

== Geographical ==
Yongkang is located in the central part of Zhejiang, in the People's Republic of China. It is southeast of the Jinhua City boundary and approximately 180 km (111.8 mi) from Hangzhou. It has an area of 1,049 km^{2} (405 sq mi).

== Climate ==
Climate data for Yongkang, elevation 103 m (338 ft), (1991–2020 normals, extremes 1981–present)
Month	Jan	Feb	Mar	Apr	May	Jun	Jul	Aug	Sep	Oct	Nov	Dec	Year
Record high °C (°F)	27.6 (81.7)	29.9 (85.8)	34.9 (94.8)	35.0 (95.0)	37.5 (99.5)	38.5 (101.3)	41.4 (106.5)	42.3 (108.1)	40.7 (105.3)	36.5 (97.7)	32.1 (89.8)	27.3 (81.1)	42.3 (108.1)
Mean daily maximum °C (°F)	10.6 (51.1)	13.4 (56.1)	17.6 (63.7)	23.8 (74.8)	28.1 (82.6)	30.3 (86.5)	35.1 (95.2)	34.3 (93.7)	29.8 (85.6)	24.9 (76.8)	19.3 (66.7)	13.2 (55.8)	23.4 (74.1)
Daily mean °C (°F)	6.2 (43.2)	8.5 (47.3)	12.5 (54.5)	18.4 (65.1)	23.1 (73.6)	25.9 (78.6)	30.0 (86.0)	29.3 (84.7)	25.2 (77.4)	19.9 (67.8)	14.3 (57.7)	8.2 (46.8)	18.5 (65.2)
Mean daily minimum °C (°F)	3.2 (37.8)	5.1 (41.2)	8.8 (47.8)	14.3 (57.7)	19.1 (66.4)	22.6 (72.7)	26.0 (78.8)	25.6 (78.1)	21.7 (71.1)	16.1 (61.0)	10.6 (51.1)	4.7 (40.5)	14.8 (58.7)
Record low °C (°F)	−8.2 (17.2)	−5.2 (22.6)	−4.3 (24.3)	1.2 (34.2)	8.9 (48.0)	12.1 (53.8)	18.4 (65.1)	18.2 (64.8)	12.5 (54.5)	2.7 (36.9)	−2.3 (27.9)	−9.5 (14.9)	−9.5 (14.9)
Average precipitation mm (inches)	81.0 (3.19)	81.8 (3.22)	149.7 (5.89)	143.5 (5.65)	163.9 (6.45)	269.8 (10.62)	130.2 (5.13)	157.3 (6.19)	104.5 (4.11)	59.9 (2.36)	73.3 (2.89)	63.5 (2.50)	1,478.4 (58.2)
Average precipitation days (≥ 0.1 mm)	13.4	13.1	17.2	15.7	16.2	18.0	12.6	14.1	11.4	8.2	10.3	10.3	160.5
Average snowy days	3.1	2.1	0.5	0	0	0	0	0	0	0	0.1	1.3	7.1
Average relative humidity (%)	75	73	72	69	70	76	68	70	72	71	74	73	72
Mean monthly sunshine hours	90.4	94.8	110.4	136.1	146.8	126.4	227.7	204.8	151.3	147.0	117.8	113.6	1,667.1
Percentage possible sunshine	28	30	30	35	35	30	54	51	41	42	37	36	37
Source: China Meteorological AdministrationAll-time May record low

== Cityscape ==
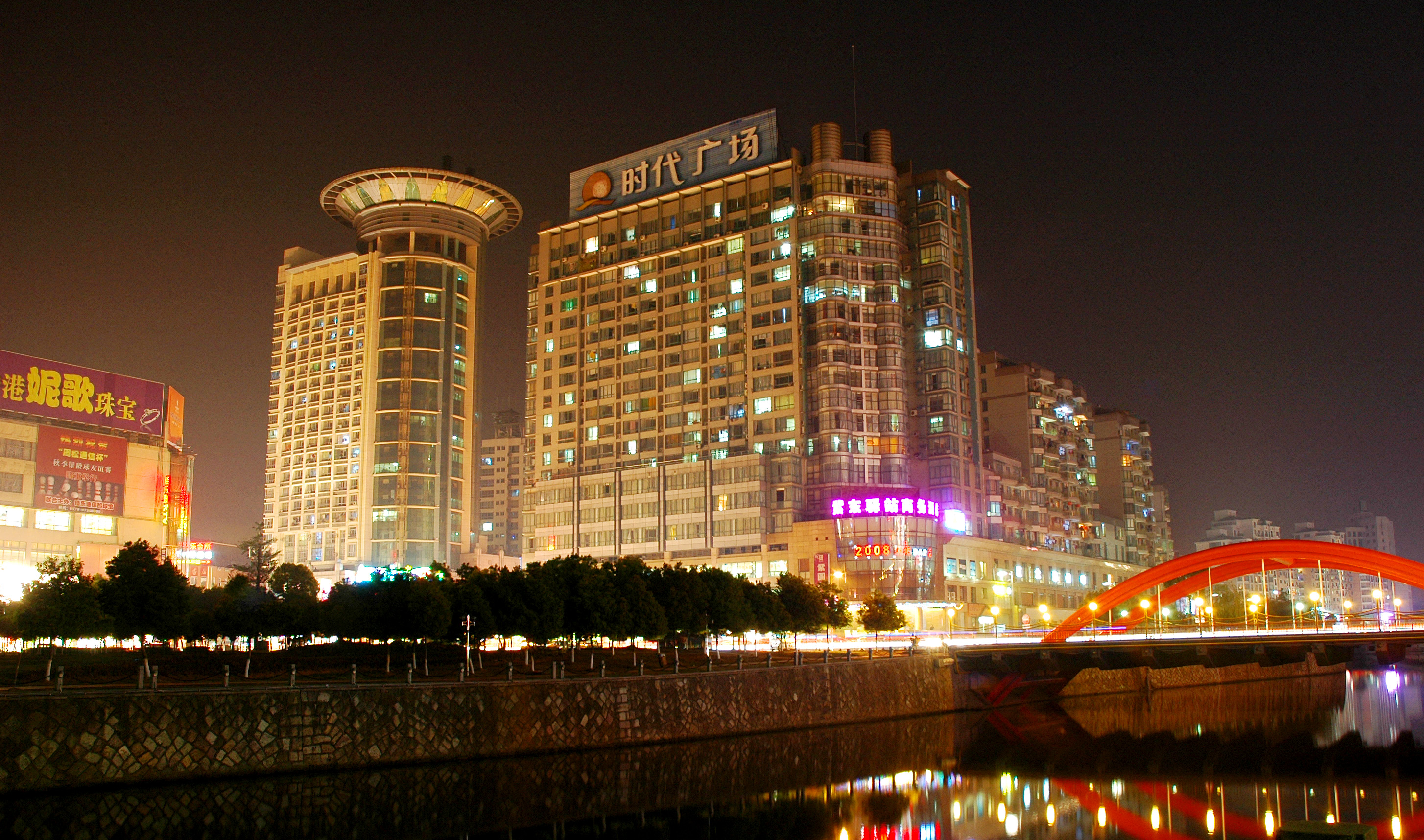
Yongkang at night (2008)

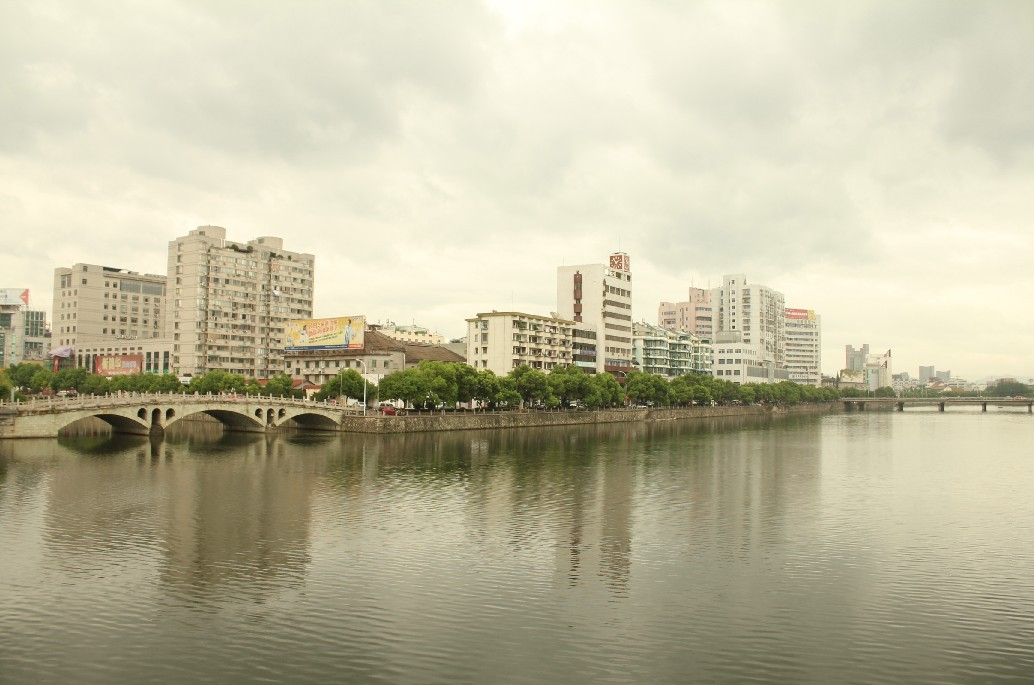
Confluence of Hua Brook (华溪) on the left and Nan Brook (南溪) on the right, forming the Yongkang River (永康江) in the middle (2010)

== See also ==
- Xijin Bridge, a famous covered bridge in China
- Yongkang railway station
