= Jinhua–Taizhou railway =

Railway line in Zhejiang, China

Jinhua–Taizhou railway 金台铁路
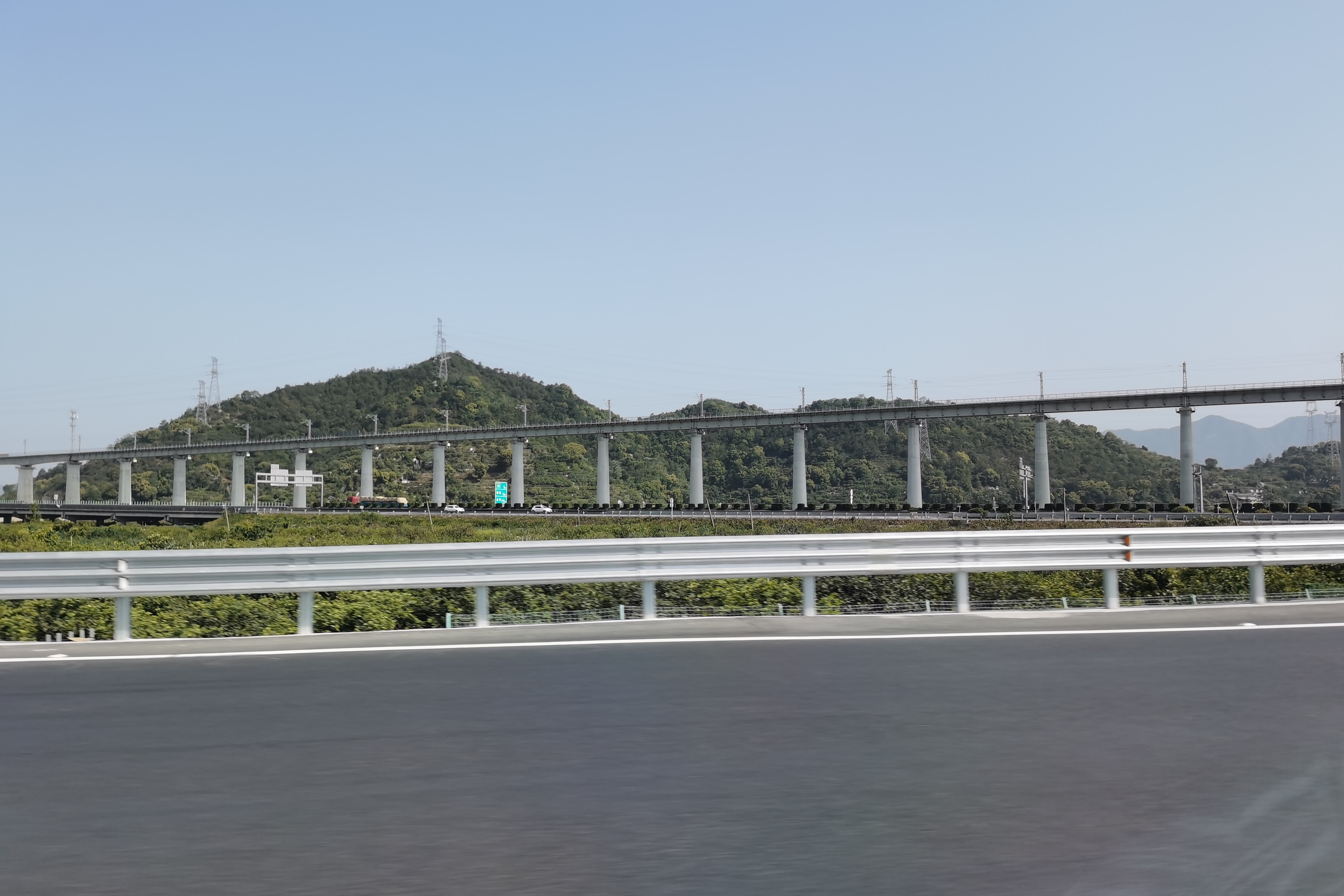
- Jinhua-Taizhou Railway in Linhai (May 2021)

Overview
- Status: Operating
- Termini: Yongkang South; Taizhou West

Service
- Type: Heavy rail

History
- Opened: 25 June 2021

Technical
- Line length: 149 km (93 mi)
- Track gauge: 1,435 mm (4 ft 8 1/2 in) standard gauge
- Electrification: 50 Hz 25,000 V
- Operating speed: 160 km/h (99 mph)

The Jinhua–Taizhou railway is a single-track electrified passenger and freight railway in China.

== History ==
Construction on the railway began in 2016. It had been expected to be finished by the end of 2020, but opening was delayed. It opened on 25 June 2021.

== Infrastructure ==
From Yongkang South railway station on the Jinhua–Wenzhou high-speed railway, the railway heads east. After Linhai East, the line splits with one branch continuing east to Toumen Port and the other heading south and terminating at Taizhou West. The mainline between Yongkang South and Taizhou West is 149 km (93 mi) long. The connecting line from Yongkang South to the existing Fengshan freight station on the Jinhua–Wenzhou railway is 11.1 kilometres (6.9 mi) long. The branch to Toumen Port is 42.5 kilometres (26.4 mi) long.
