= Jinhua–Wenzhou railway =

Railway line in Zhejiang, China

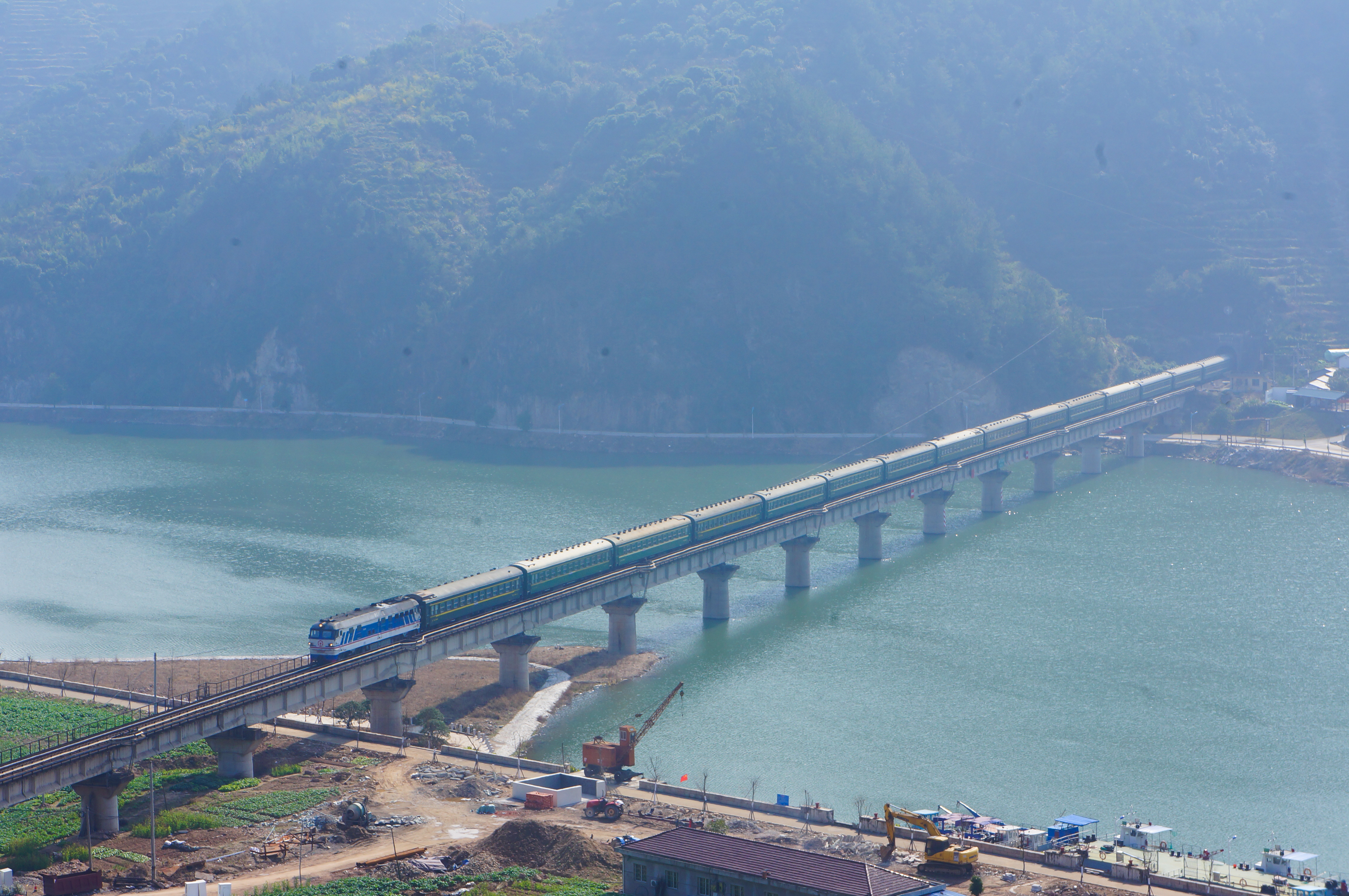
- A train passes Lishui Daxi River Bridge.

Overview
- Native name: 金温铁路
- Status: Operational
- Termini: Jinhua South; Wenzhou
- Stations: 7

Service
- Type: Heavy rail Regional rail
- System: China Railway

History
- Commenced: December 18, 1992
- Opened: June 11, 1998

Technical
- Line length: 252 km (157 mi)
- Track gauge: 1,435 mm (4 ft 8 1/2 in) standard gauge

The Jinhua–Wenzhou railway (simplified Chinese: 金温铁路; traditional Chinese: 金溫鐵路; pinyin: Jīnwēn tiělù), also known as the Jinwen line, is a railway in Zhejiang Province, China, connecting Jinhua and Wenzhou. It is the first railway with the investment from a joint venture, between Chinese government-owned corporations and privately held companies in mainland China. The construction of this 252-kilometer (157 mi)-long rail line began on December 18, 1992, and it was opened on June 11, 1998. Upon the completion of its construction, all of the share owned by private shareholders has been transferred to state-own corporations. The railway is now under the supervision of CR Shanghai.

A major upgrade along this route was carried out as the Jinhua–Wenzhou high-speed railway or Jinhua–Wenzhou Rail Expansion Project. Built to a design speed of 350 kilometers per hour (217 mph), this project shortened the rail distance between Jinhua and Wenzhou to 188 kilometers (117 mi). This project opened in December 2015.

== Railway stations ==
=== Jinyun railway station ===
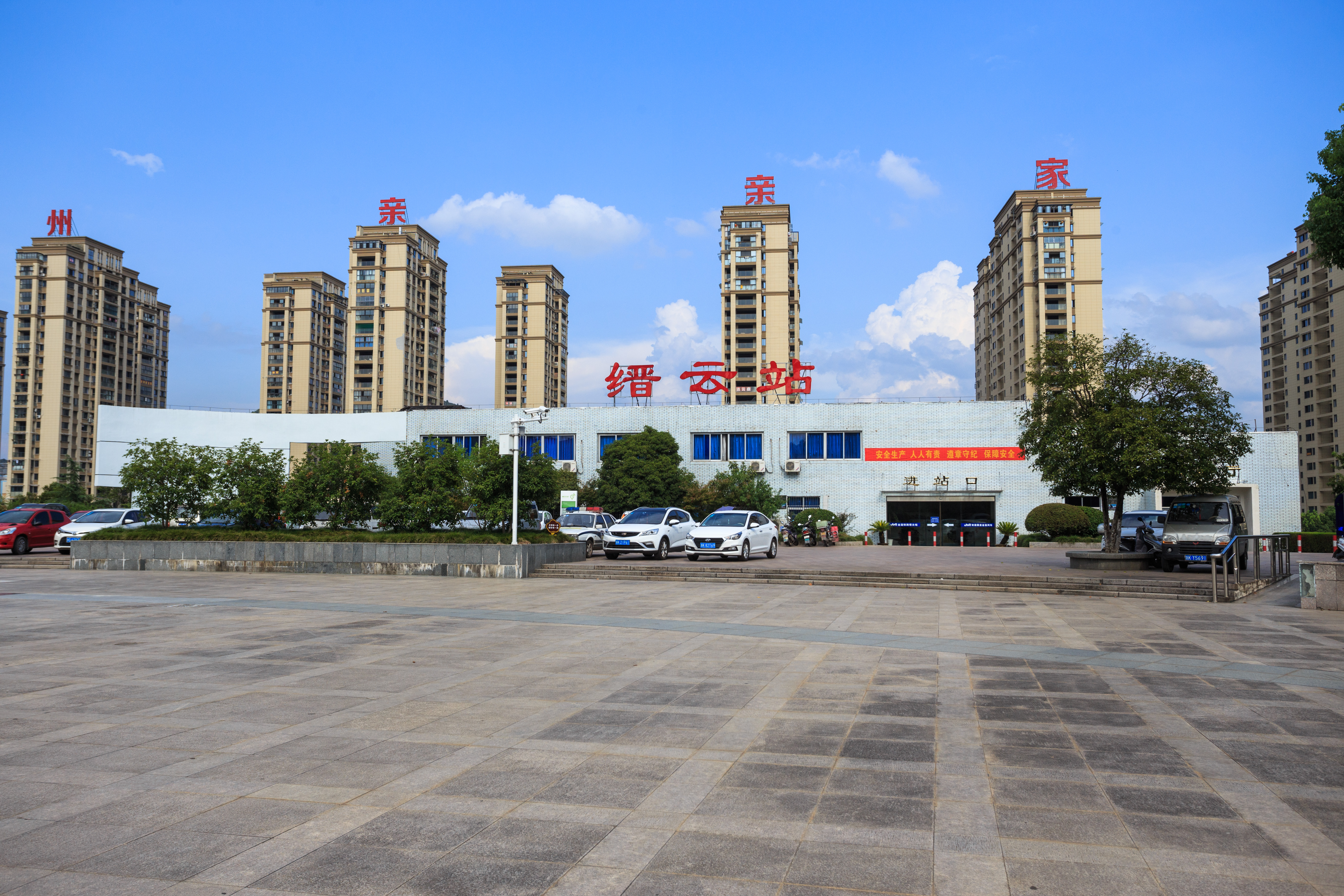
Jinyun railway station

Jinyun railway station (Chinese: 缙云站) is a railway station in Jinyun County, Lishui, Zhejiang, China. It is an intermediate stop on the Jinhua–Wenzhou railway.

== See also ==
- List of railway lines in China
