= Taizhou railway station =

Taizhou railway station can refer to the following stations in China:

== Jiangsu Province ==
- Taizhou railway station (Jiangsu) on Nanjing–Qidong railway.

== Zhejiang Province ==
- Taizhou railway station (Zhejiang Province), a station on the Hangzhou-Taizhou high-speed railway.
- Taizhou West railway station, formerly known as Taizhou railway station, a station on the Yongtaiwen Railway and Jinhua–Taizhou railway.
