= Linhai railway station =

Railway station in China

Linhai 临海
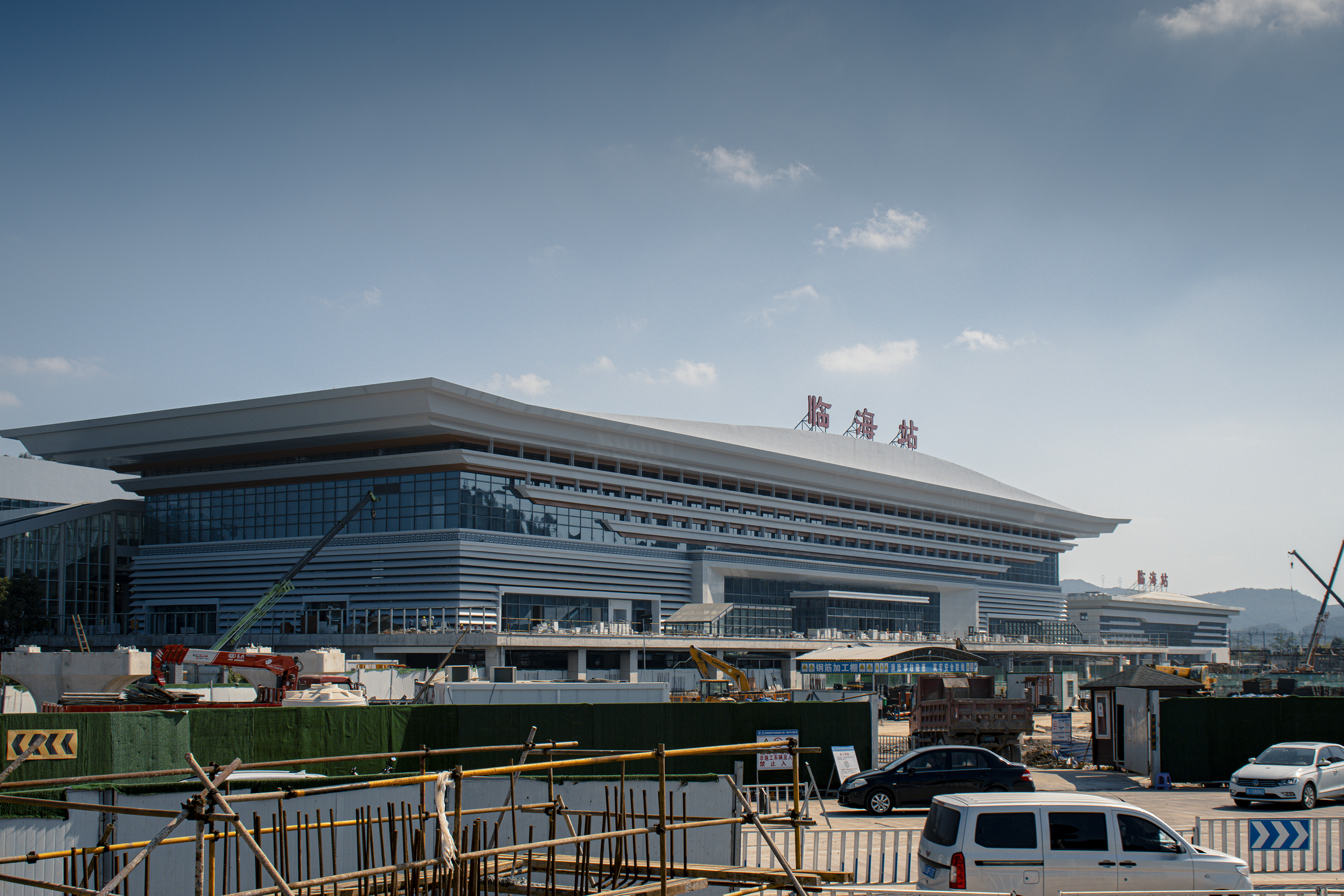
- Linhai Railway Station (2021)

General information
- Location: Linhai, Taizhou, Zhejiang; China
- Coordinates: 28°52′58.61″N 121°14′34.61″E
- Lines: Ningbo–Taizhou–Wenzhou railway; Hangzhou–Taizhou high-speed railway
- Platforms: 4

Other information
- Station code: LHA

History
- Opened: 8 January 2022
Location

Linhai railway station is a railway station on the Ningbo–Taizhou–Wenzhou railway located in Linhai, Taizhou, Zhejiang, China.

This station is also served by the Hangzhou–Taizhou high-speed railway, opened on 8 January 2022.

Preceding station	China Railway High-speed	Following station
Sanmen County towards Ningbo	Ningbo–Taizhou–Wenzhou railway	Taizhou West towards Wenzhou South
Tiantaishan towards Hangzhou East	Hangzhou–Taizhou high-speed railway	Taizhou towards Yuhuan
