= Wenling railway station =

Railway station in China

Wenling 温岭
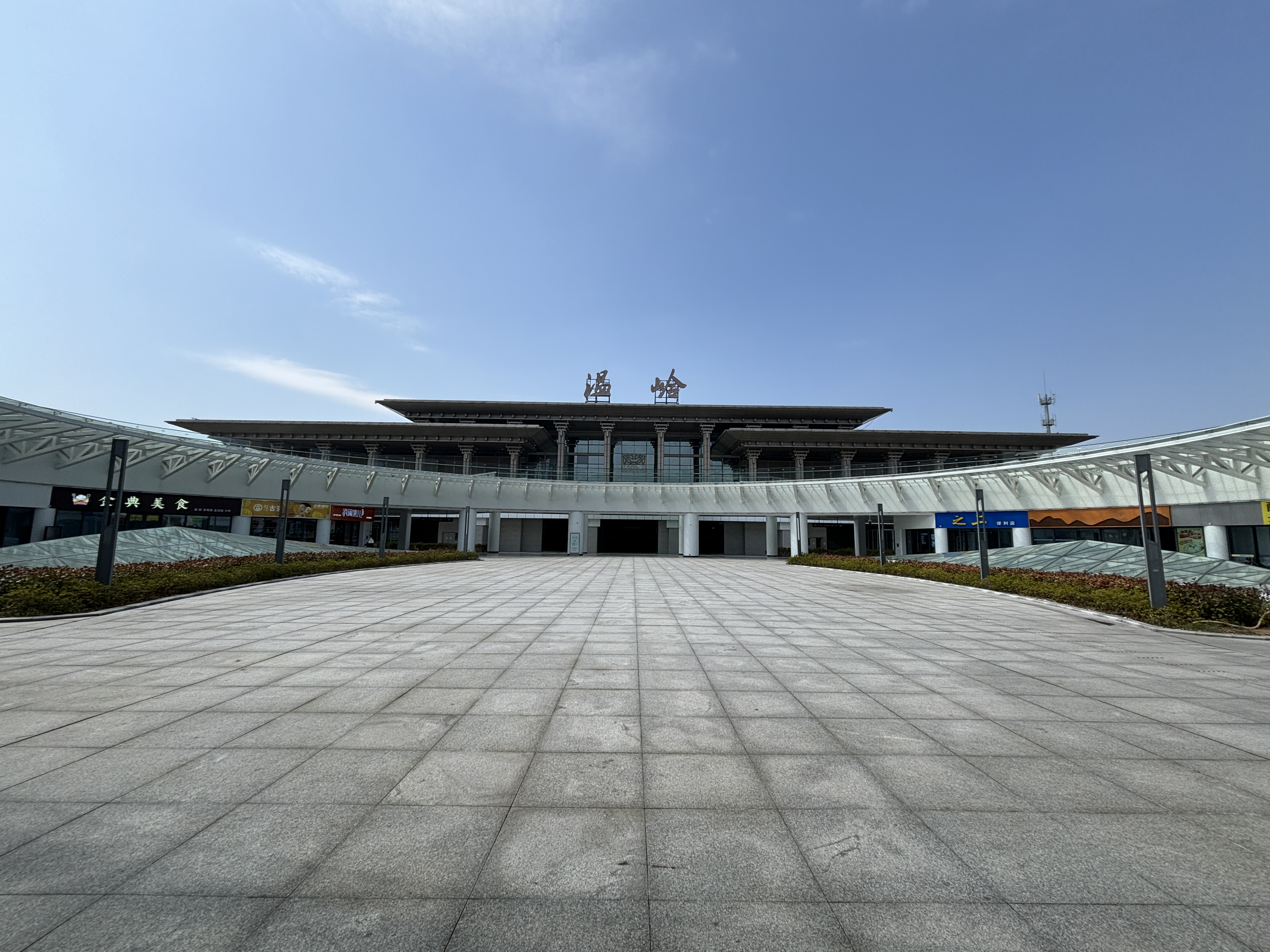
- Wenling Railway Station (2024)

General information
- Location: Wenling, Taizhou, Zhejiang; China
- Coordinates: 28°28′55.99″N 121°19′13.23″E
- Lines: Ningbo–Taizhou–Wenzhou railway; Hangzhou–Taizhou high-speed railway

Other information
- Station code: WLI

History
- Opened: 8 January 2022
Location

Wenling railway station is a railway station on the Ningbo–Taizhou–Wenzhou railway and the Hangzhou–Taizhou high-speed railway located in Wenling, Taizhou, Zhejiang, China.

This station is also served by the Hangzhou–Taizhou high-speed railway, opened on 8 January 2022.

== Metro station ==
Line S1 of the Taizhou Rail Transit opened on 28 December 2022.

== History ==
The station closed from 11 October 2020 for construction of the Hangzhou–Shaoxing–Taizhou high-speed railway. It is expected to resume operation on 7 January 2021.

Preceding station	China Railway High-speed	Following station
Taizhou West towards Ningbo	Ningbo–Taizhou–Wenzhou railway	Yandangshan towards Wenzhou South
Taizhou towards Hangzhou East	Hangzhou–Taizhou high-speed railway	Wenling West towards Yuhuan
