= Ningbo–Zhoushan railway =

Railway line in China

Ningbo–Zhoushan railway 甬舟铁路

Overview
- Status: Under Construction
- Locale: Zhejiang Province, China
- Termini: Ningbo East; Zhoushan

Service
- Operator(s): China Railway Shanghai Group

History
- Planned opening: 2028

Technical
- Line length: 76.396 km (47.5 mi)
- Track gauge: 1,435 mm (4 ft 8 1/2 in)
- Operating speed: 250 km/h (155 mph)

Ningbo–Zhoushan high-speed railway is a high-speed railway under construction in Zhejiang Province, China. It will be 76.396 kilometres (47.5 mi) long and have a design speed of 250 kilometres per hour (160 mph). It is expected to open in 2028.

== History ==
The preliminary design of the railway was approved in November 2020. Construction began on 22 December 2020.

The line includes a 16.2 km undersea tunnel.

== Stations ==
The line has the following stations:

- Ningbo East (located near Ailiu station on Line 4 of Ningbo Rail Transit)
- Yunlong (branch)
- Qiuga
- Beilun West
- Jintang
- Ma'ao
- Zhoushan

== See also ==
- Xihoumen Rail/Road Bridge
