= Taizhou railway station (Zhejiang Province) =

Railway station in China

Taizhou 台州

General information
- Location: Jiaojiang District, Taizhou, Zhejiang; China
- Line: Hangzhou–Taizhou high-speed railway
- Platforms: 8

History
- Opened: 8 January 2022
Location

Taizhou railway station (Chinese: 台州站; pinyin: Tāizhōu zhàn) is a railway station in Jiaojiang District, Taizhou, Zhejiang, China. It is an intermediate stop on the Hangzhou–Taizhou high-speed railway.

== History ==
It was known as Taizhou Central railway station during construction. It was renamed to Taizhou railway station on 25 June 2021, coinciding with the opening of the Jinhua–Taizhou railway and the renaming of the old Taizhou railway station to Taizhou West.

The station opened with the Hangzhou–Taizhou high-speed railway on 8 January 2022.

== Design ==
The station has eight platforms arranged in four islands, with two bypass lines that pass through the middle of the station.

== Metro station ==
Line S1 has opened at 28 December 2022.

== Future development ==
There will be a future interchange with Line S1 and Line S2 of the Taizhou Rail Transit.

Preceding station	China Railway High-speed	Following station
Linhai towards Hangzhou East	Hangzhou–Taizhou high-speed railway	Wenling towards Yuhuan
