= Yandangshan railway station =

Railway station in Wenzhou, China

Coordinates: 28.3445°N 121.1478°E

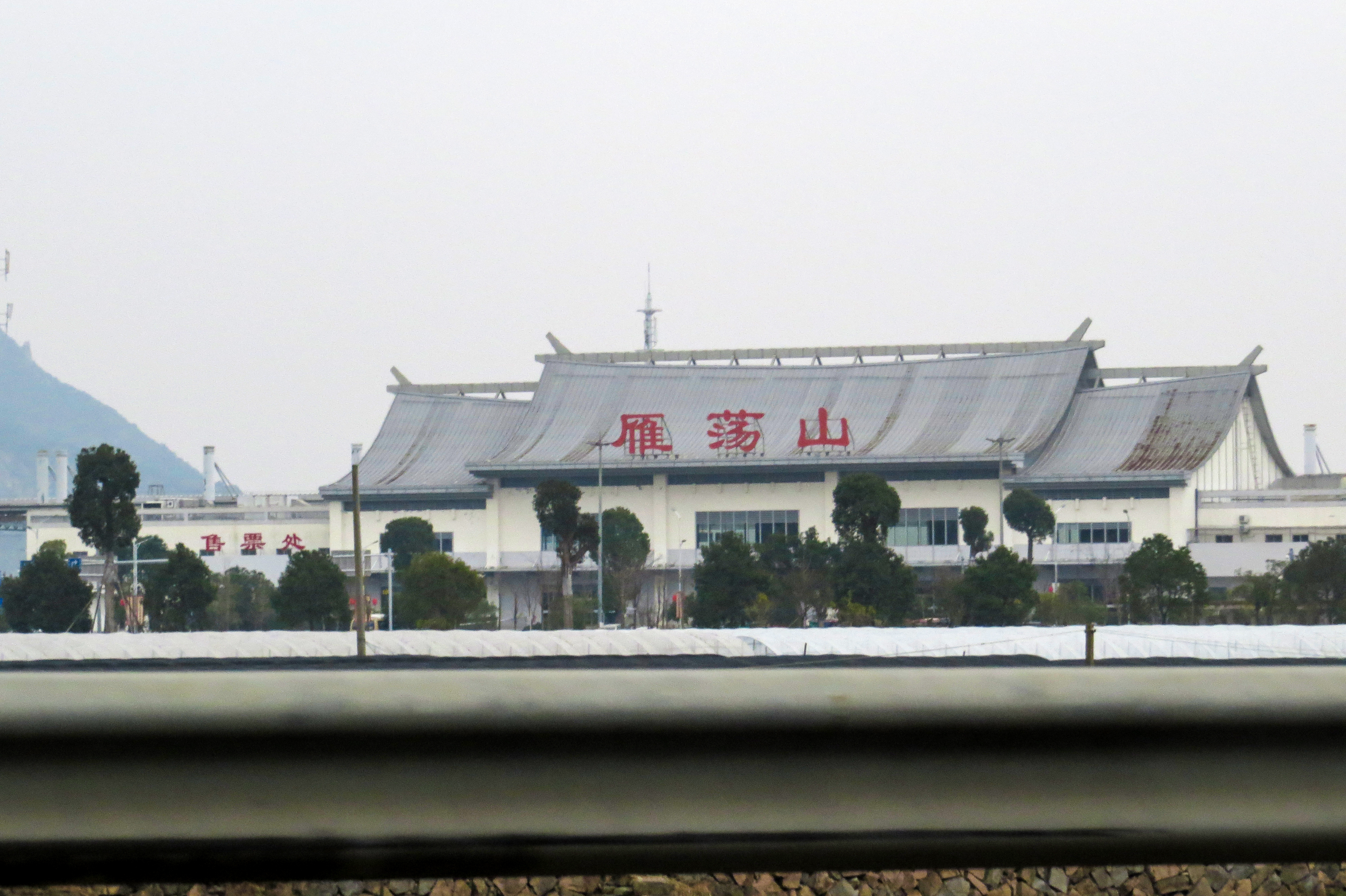
Yandangshan station in 2017

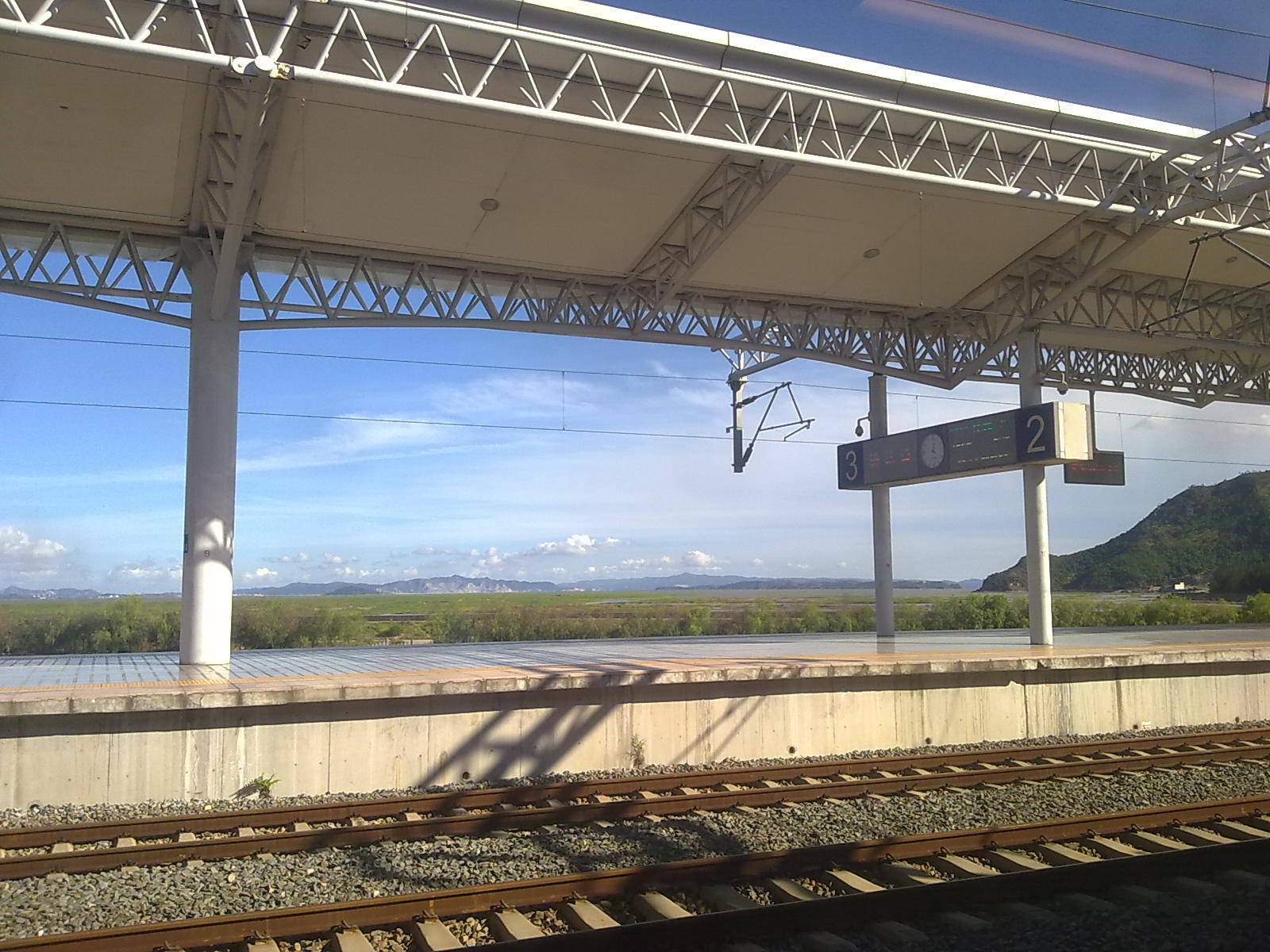
A view from the Yandangshan railway station towards the Yueqing Bay.

Yandangshan station (雁荡山站) is a high-speed railway station located in Wenzhou, Zhejiang, China. It is part of the Ningbo–Taizhou–Wenzhou railway.

Preceding station	China Railway High-speed	Following station
Wenling towards Ningbo	Ningbo–Taizhou–Wenzhou railway	Yueqing East towards Wenzhou South
