= Sanmen County railway station =

Railway station of Yongtaiwen Railway located in Zhejiang, China

Coordinates: 29.0578°N 121.3586°E

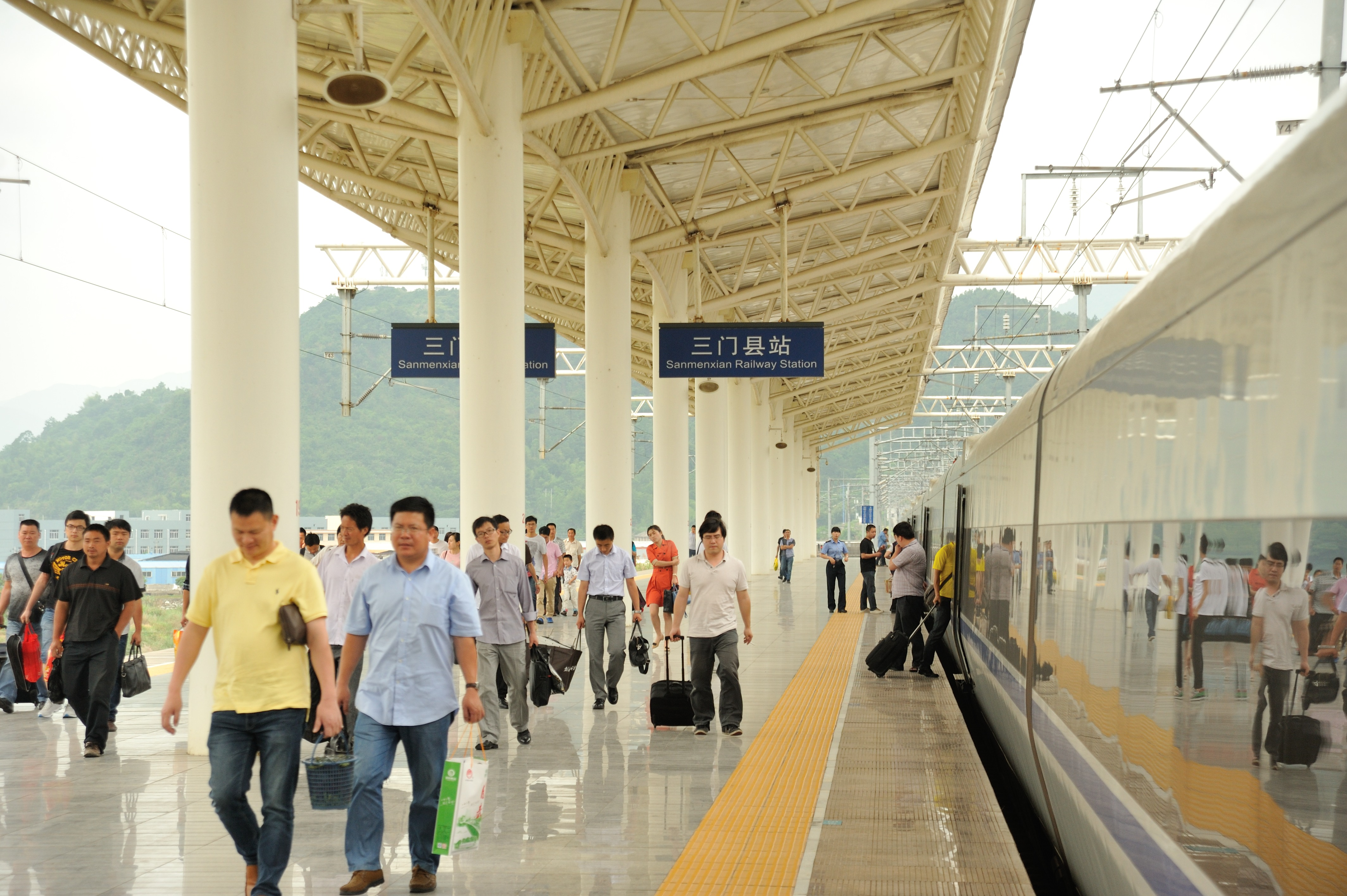
Sanmenxian railway station Platform

Sanmenxian railway station (Chinese: 三门县站; pinyin: Sānménxiàn zhàn; lit. 'Sanmen County railway station') is a railway station of Yongtaiwen Railway located in Sanmen County, Taizhou, Zhejiang, China.

Preceding station	China Railway High-speed	Following station
Ninghai towards Ningbo	Ningbo–Taizhou–Wenzhou railway	Linhai towards Wenzhou South
