= Tiantaishan railway station =

Railway station in Taizhou, Zhejiang

Tiantaishan 天台山
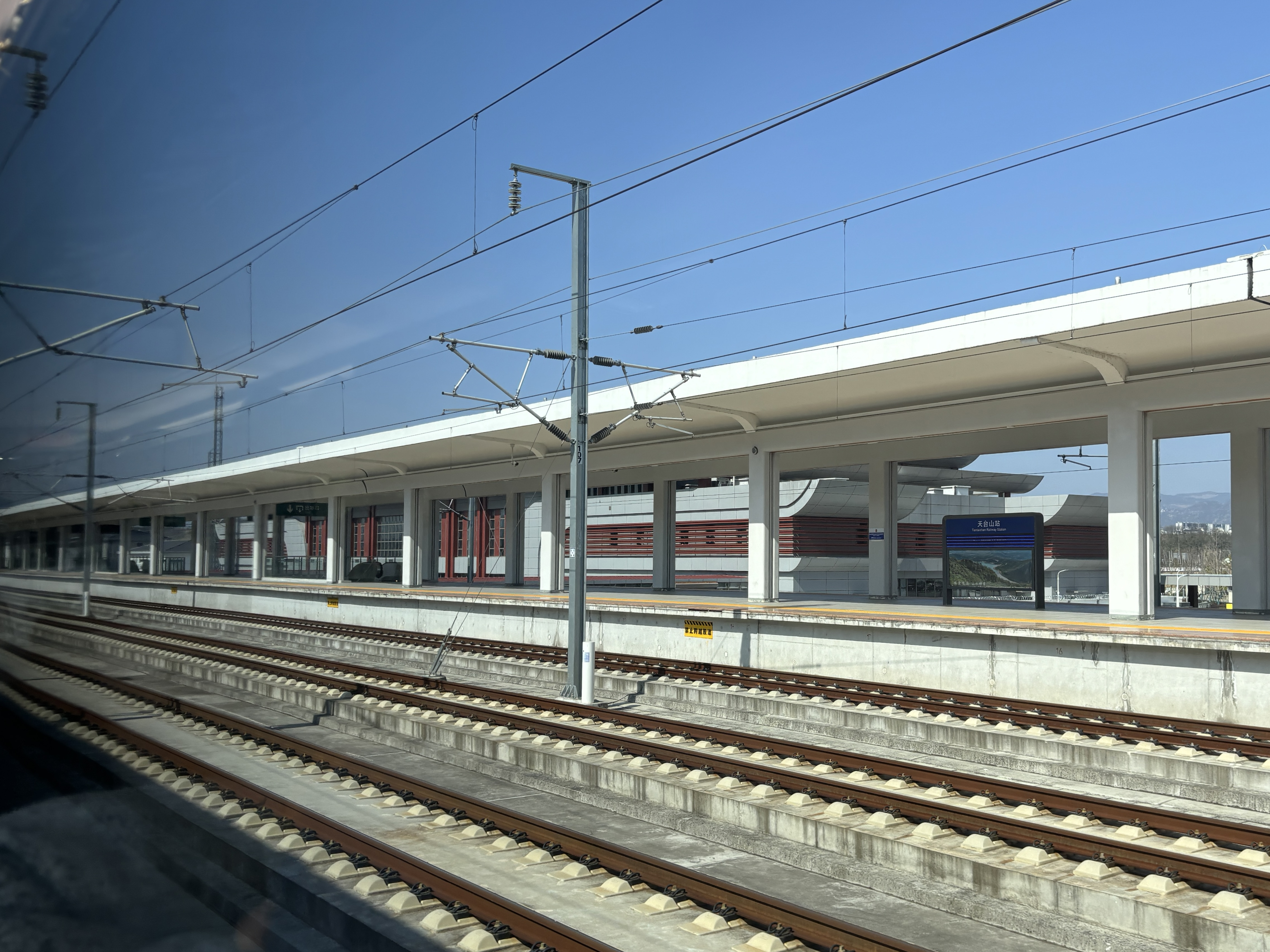

General information
- Location: Tiantai County, Taizhou, Zhejiang; China
- Coordinates: 29.1434°N 120.9738°E
- Line: Hangzhou–Taizhou high-speed railway
- Platforms: 4

History
- Opened: 8 January 2022
Location

Tiantaishan railway station (Chinese: 天台山站; pinyin: Tiāntāishān zhàn; lit. 'Tiantai Mountain railway station') is a railway station in Tiantai County, Taizhou, Zhejiang, China. It is an intermediate stop on the Hangzhou–Taizhou high-speed railway and was opened with the line on 8 January 2022.

There are two island platforms.

Preceding station	China Railway High-speed	Following station
Shengzhou Xinchang towards Hangzhou East	Hangzhou–Taizhou high-speed railway	Linhai towards Yuhuan
