= Taizhou Rail Transit =

Metro system in Taizhou, Zhejiang, China

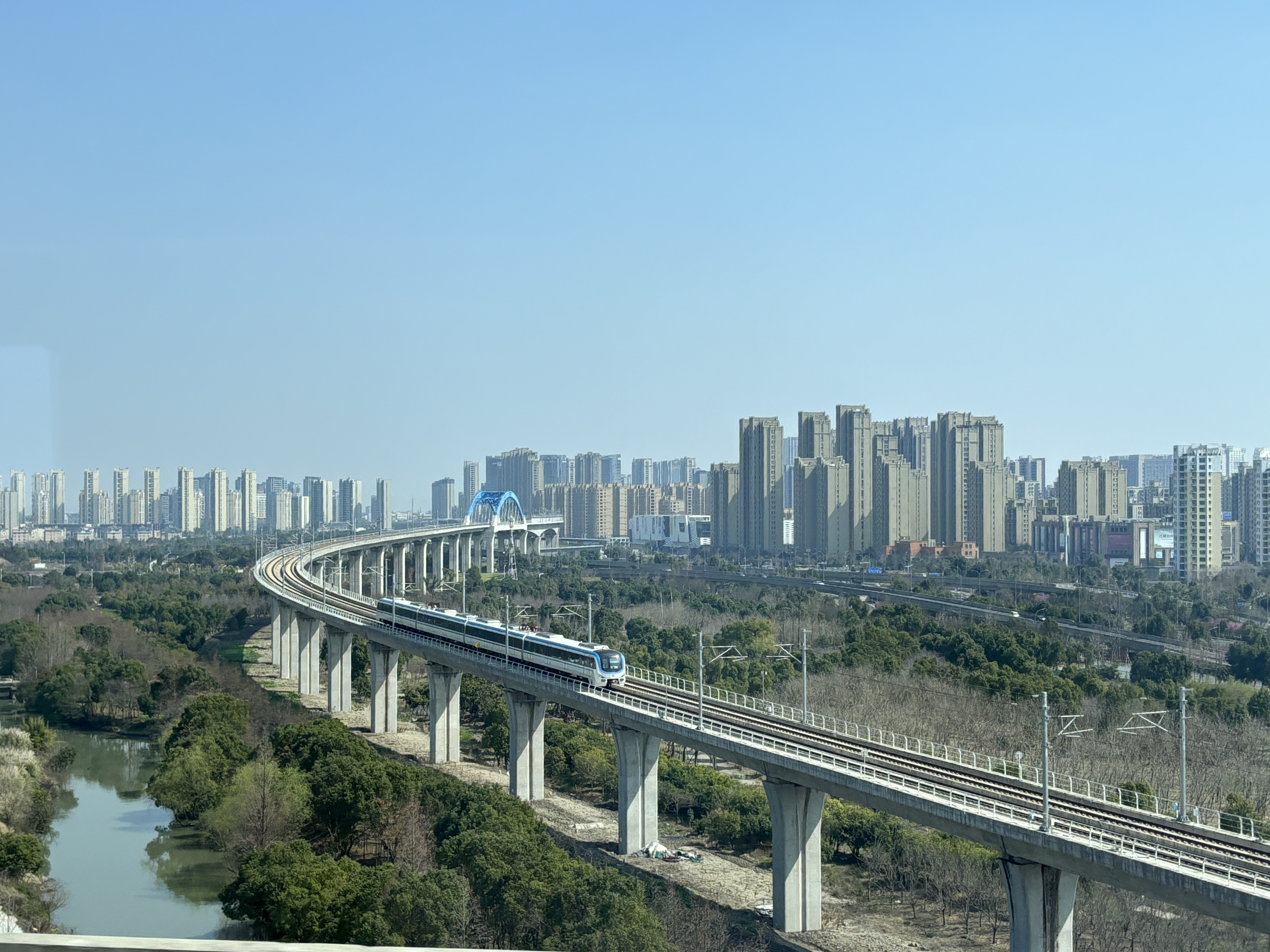

Overview
- Locale: Taizhou, Zhejiang Province, China
- Transit type: Hybrid commuter rail and rapid transit
- Number of lines: 1 (in operation)
- Number of stations: 15 (in operation)

Operation
- Began operation: 28 December 2022; 3 years ago

Technical
- System length: 52.4 km (32.6 mi)
- Track gauge: 1,435 mm (4 ft 8 1/2 in) standard gauge
System map

Taizhou Rail Transit (simplified Chinese: 台州轨道交通; traditional Chinese: 台州軌道交通; pinyin: Tāizhōu Guǐdào Jiāotōng) is an urban rail transit system in Taizhou, Zhejiang Province, China. The system is operated by Taizhou Rail Transit Construction and Development Co., Ltd. In the near term (Phase I), two lines, S1 and S2, are planned; in the long term, lines S3 and S4 are planned.

The first phase of the plan was approved by the National Development and Reform Commission of the People's Republic of China in December 2014, and approved by the Zhejiang Provincial Development and Reform Commission in September 2016. Construction of Line S1 started in November 2016 until its opening in December 2022.

== Nomenclature ==
In the PRC both the terms simplified Chinese: 市郊铁路; traditional Chinese: 市郊鐵路; pinyin: shìjiāo tiělù (Urban-Suburban railway) and simplified Chinese: 市域铁路; traditional Chinese: 市域鐵路; pinyin: shìyù tiělù (Prefectural area railway) refer to newly-opened commuter/regional railway services. These terms are usually interchangeable and are designated with the Latin letter S.

In Southern Zhejiang province, however, shìjiāo tiělù refers to genuine commuter/regional lines like that of Transilien, while shìyù tiělù, dubbed with S, refers to partially underground urban systems like that of the RER. Taizhou, in particular, has both systems in its rail transit in operation; while Wenzhou has both an RER-like system in operation and a planned rapid transit. The RER-like system has everything similar to a rapid transit in terms of operation, and has no direct connections with the national railway system, yet still has a loading gauge and signaling system inherited from the interprovincial railway and runs on the left track, and comes with a longer distance between stations (approximately 3 km).

== Lines ==
Line	Terminals		Construction started	Opening	Length km	Stations
S1	Taizhou Railway Station	Chengnan	November 2016	28 December 2022	52.4	15
S2	Beiyang	Fangte	2023	2027	66	22

Line S1 functions to locate the north-south express track passage in the central urban area of Taizhou and the express track passage connecting Wenling and Yuhuan to the south of the urban area, connecting Toumen Port Area, Taizhou railway station, Wenling railway station and other important integrated transportation nodes.

Line S2 is an east-west fast track passage in the central city of Taizhou, connecting Huangyan District, Taizhou West railway station, Jiaojiang District, Taizhou Railway Station, Taizhou Bay New District, Jinqing, Wenling East New District, Songmen, Shitang and other important blocks and stations, together with Line S1, built a cross-speed track in downtown Taizhou.

== Long-term planning ==
Line S3 is functionally positioned as a rapid rail transit channel connecting Linhai's downtown area and Taizhou's downtown area, connecting important transportation nodes such as Linhai Railway Station, Linhai South Railway Station, and Taizhou Railway Station.

The M line is mainly a general rail line serving the "three districts and two cities". The function of M1 line is to connect the east-west rail transit line of Huangyan City and Jiaojiang City; the function of line M2 is the east-west rail transit line connecting Taizhou West Station, Huangyan City, Luqiao City, Taizhou Airport, and Taizhou Bay New District; the function of M3 line is It is positioned as a north-south rail transit line connecting Jiangbei New District, Jiaojiang District, Luqiao District, and Wenling City; the function of M4 line is to connect Huangyan District, Jianyang Lake, The rail transit line of Luqiao City and Taizhou Airport; the M5 line is functionally positioned as an east-west rail transit line within Wenling City, connecting Wenling Eastern New District, Ruoheng Town, Wenling City, Wenling Railway Station, Daxi Town, etc.
