= Ningbo–Jinhua railway =

Railway line in China

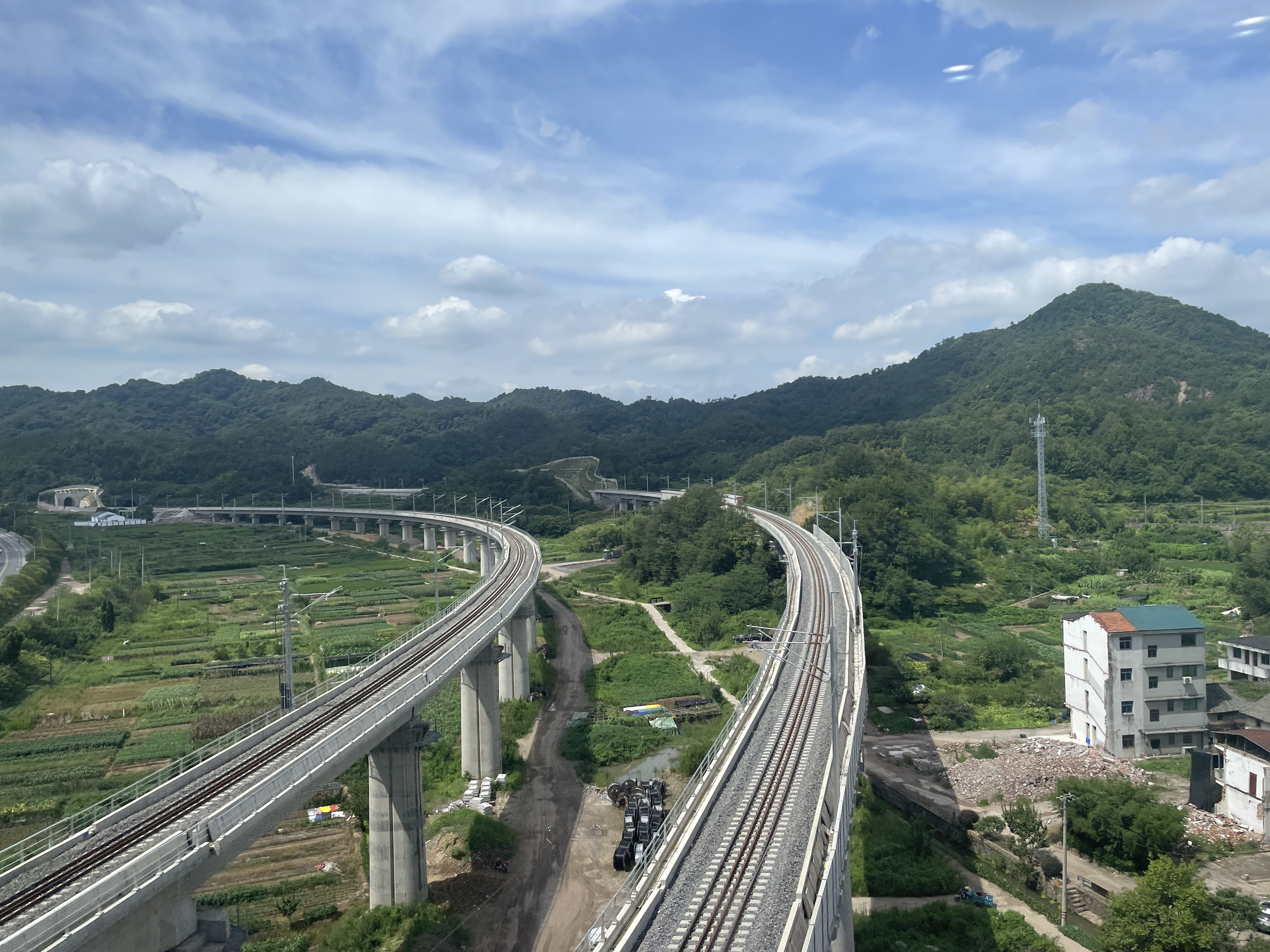
- Ningbo-Jinhua Railway under Hukun HSR in Yiwu

Overview
- Status: Under construction
- Termini: Yunlong (through service to Ningbo); Yiwu

Service
- Type: Heavy rail

History
- Opened: 31 December 2023

Technical
- Line length: 188.3 km (117 mi) (Yunlong to Yiwu)
- Track gauge: 1,435 mm (4 ft 8 1/2 in) standard gauge
- Operating speed: 160 km/h (99 mph)

The Ningbo–Jinhua railway is a double-track railway in China. It is a combined passenger and freight railway. The railway is 188.3 kilometres (117.0 mi) long with 9 stations, and has a design speed of 160 kilometres per hour (99 mph). The railway is one of the first purpose built electrified railways capable of operating double stack container trains in China. It opened on 31 December 2023.

== History ==
Construction began on 29 December 2016. The railway was opened on 31 December 2023.

== Stations ==
The line has the following stations:

- (through service to Ningbo)
- Yunlong
- Fenghua
- Xikou
- Xinchang North
- Shengzhou Xinchang
- Shengzhou West
- Dongyang North
- Suxi
- Yiwu
