= Wenzhou North railway station =

Railway station in Wenzhou, China

Wenzhoubei 温州北
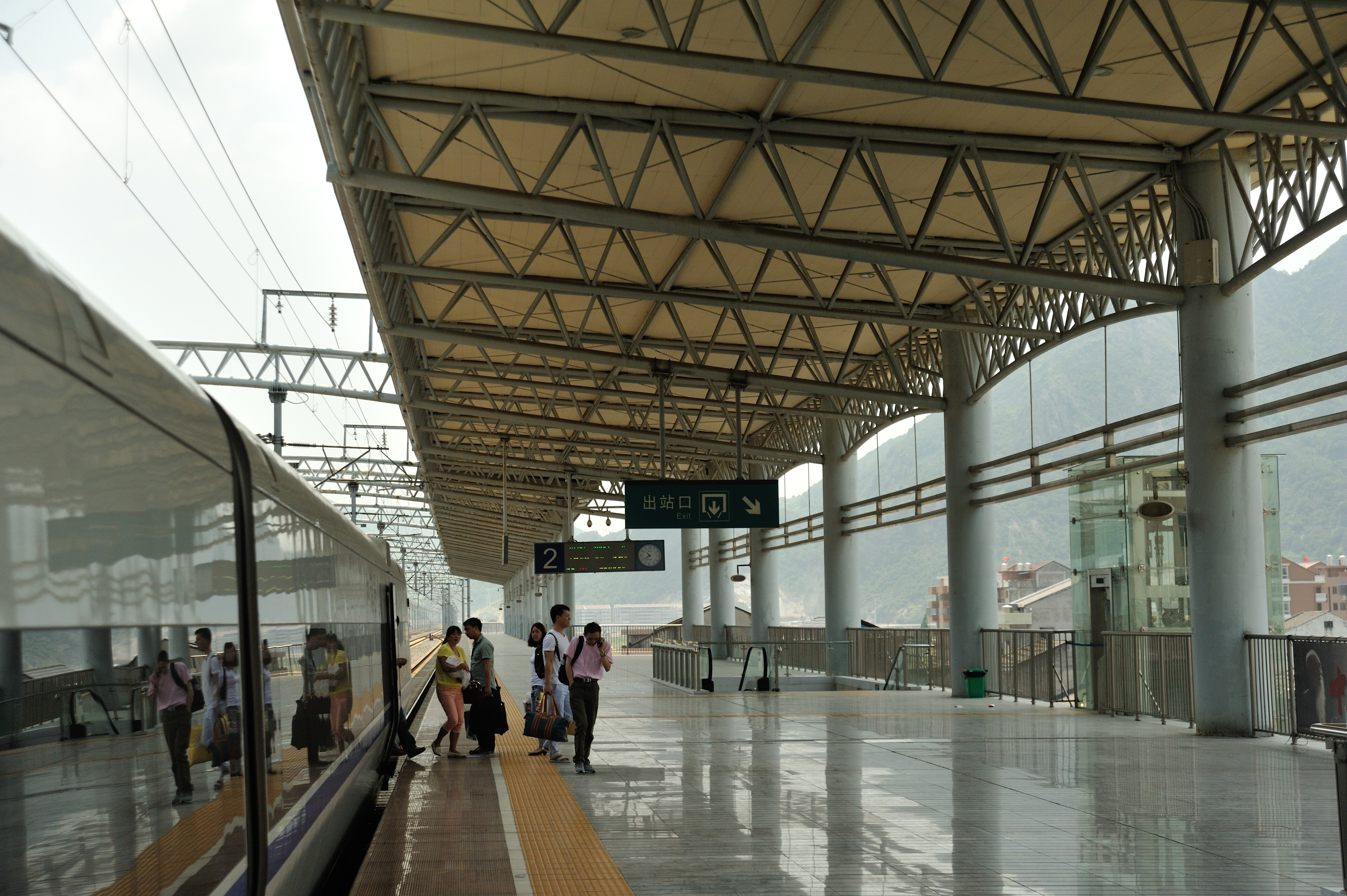
- Platform

Chinese name
- Simplified Chinese: 温州北站
- Traditional Chinese: 溫州北站
Transcriptions
Standard Mandarin
- Hanyu Pinyin: Wēnzhōuběi Zhàn

General information
- Location: Yongjia County, Wenzhou, Zhejiang; China
- Coordinates: 28°4′19.50″N 120°41′27.97″E
- Operator: China Railway Shanghai Group
- Lines: Ningbo–Taizhou–Wenzhou railway Hangzhou–Wenzhou high-speed railway
- Platforms: 8 (2 island platforms and 4 side platforms)
- Tracks: 12

Construction
- Structure type: Elevated

History
- Opened: 28 September 2009
- Former names: Yongjia (永嘉)
Location

Wenzhou North railway station, formerly known as Yongjia railway station, is a railway station on the Ningbo–Taizhou–Wenzhou railway and Hangzhou–Wenzhou high-speed railway located in Yongjia County, Wenzhou, Zhejiang, China.

== History ==
Yongjia railway station closed on 14 September 2021 for renovation. It will be renamed to Wenzhou North railway station when it reopens.

Preceding station	China Railway High-speed	Following station
Yueqing towards Ningbo	Ningbo–Taizhou–Wenzhou railway	Wenzhou South Terminus
Nanxijiang towards Hangzhou West	Hangzhou–Wenzhou high-speed railway	Wenzhou South Terminus
