= Shengzhou Xinchang railway station =

Railway station in China

Shengzhou Xinchang 嵊州新昌
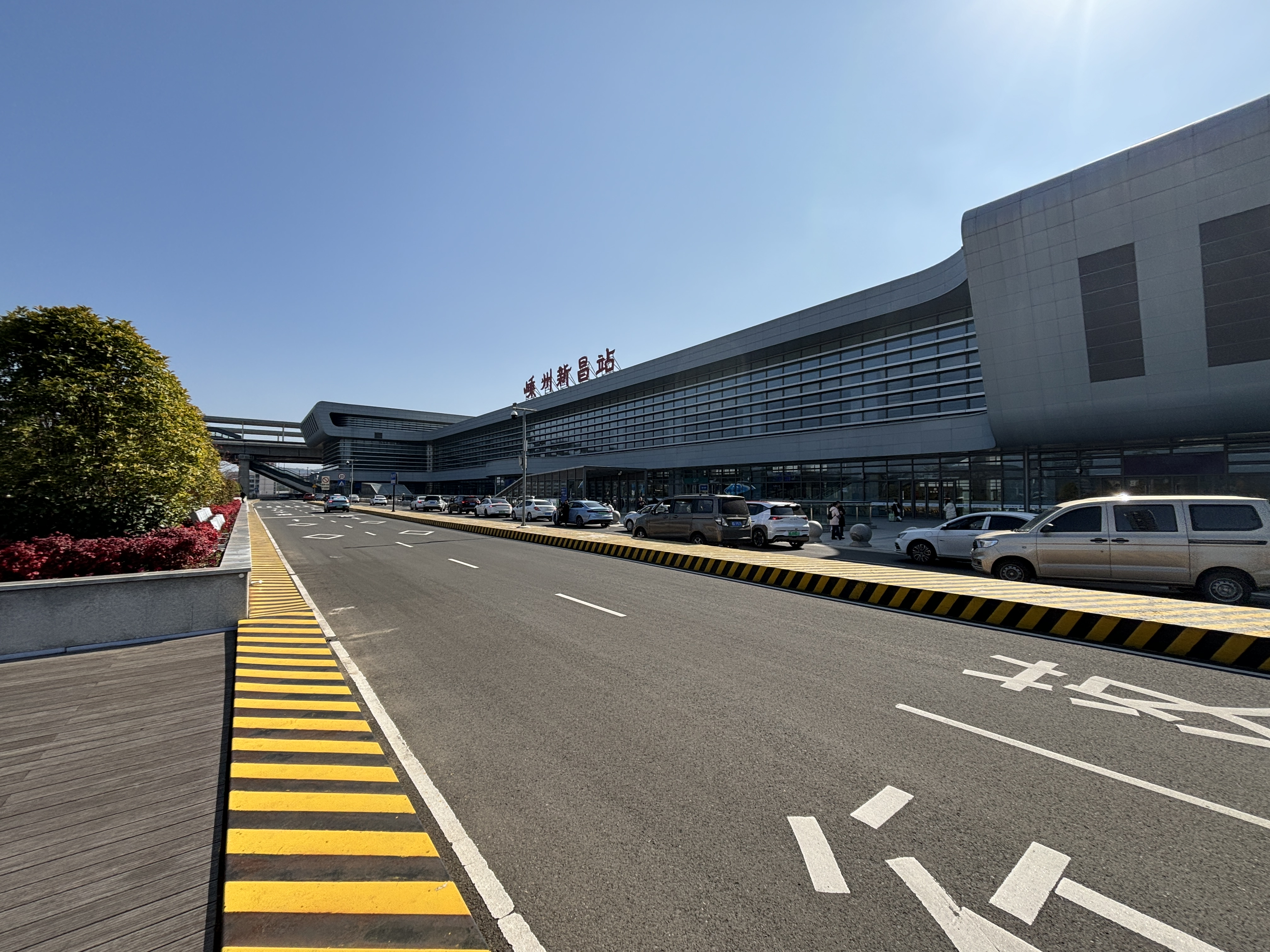

General information
- Location: Sanjiang Subdistrict, Shengzhou, Shaoxing, Zhejiang Province; China
- Coordinates: 40°04′11″N 116°21′48″E
- Lines: Hangzhou–Taizhou high-speed railway; Ningbo–Jinhua railway (under construction)

History
- Opened: January 8, 2022
Location

Shengzhou Xinchang railway station (Chinese: 嵊州新昌站) is a railway station in Sanjiang Subdistrict, Shengzhou, Shaoxing, Zhejiang Province. It is situated between Shengzhou county-level city and Xinchang County, both under the administration of Shaoxing prefecture-level city.

== History ==
The station opened with the Hangzhou–Taizhou high-speed railway on 8 January 2022.

== Design ==
The station has a cross shape, with platforms on both the Hangzhou–Taizhou high-speed railway and the Ningbo–Jinhua railway.

| Preceding station | China Railway High-speed | Following station |
|---|---|---|
| Shengzhou North towards Hangzhou East | Hangzhou–Taizhou high-speed railway | Tiantaishan towards Yuhuan |
