= Yueqing East railway station =

Railway station in Yueqing, Wenzhou, China

Coordinates: 28°12′1.16″N 120°59′13.62″E

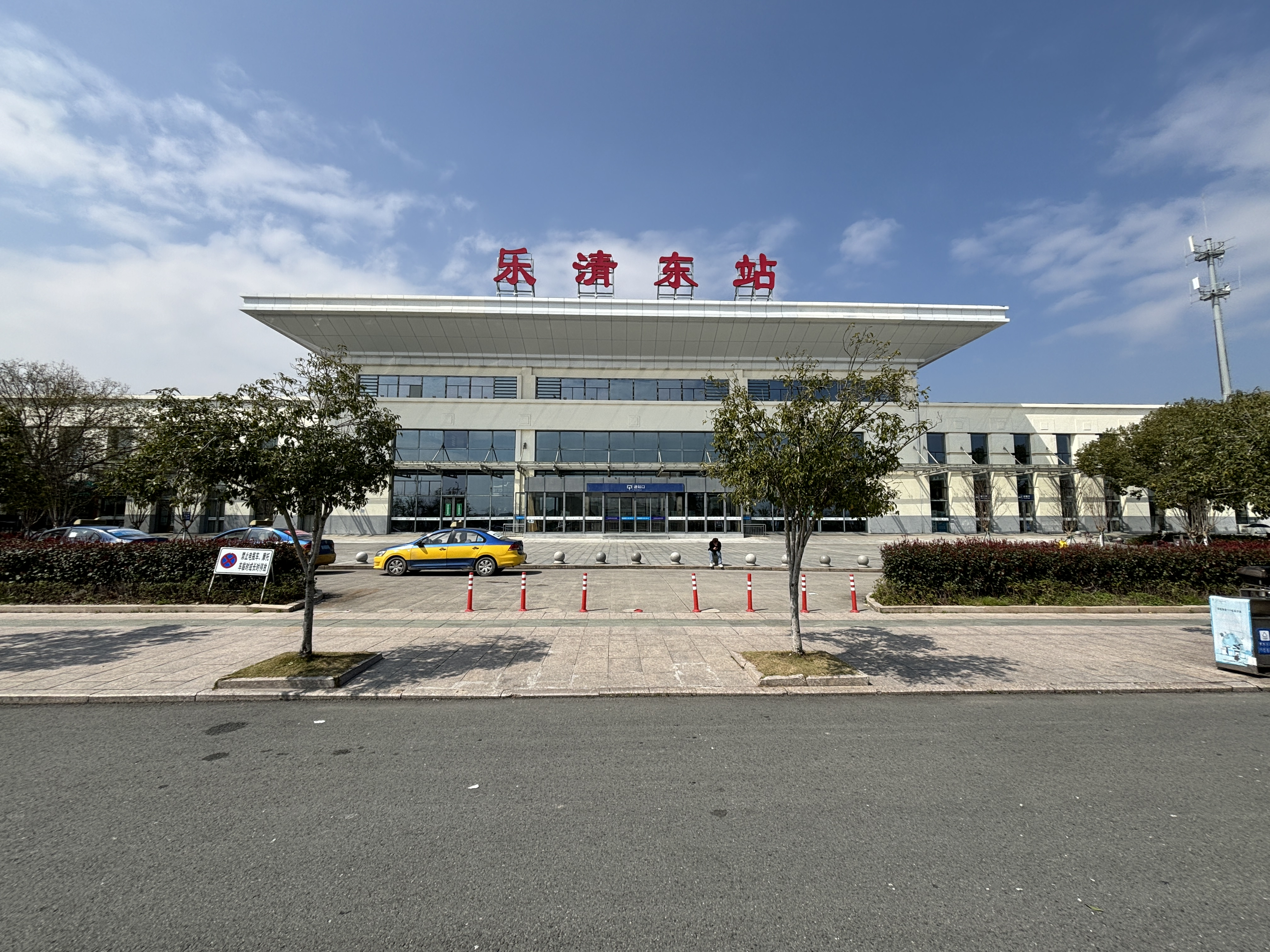
Station building in 2024

Yueqing East railway station (Chinese: 乐清东站; pinyin: Yuèqīngdōng zhàn) is a railway station on the Ningbo–Taizhou–Wenzhou railway located in Yueqing, Wenzhou, Zhejiang, China. It opened in September 2009. The station renamed from Shenfang railway station (Chinese: 绅坊站; pinyin: Shēnfǎng zhàn) to Yueqing East railway station on November 18, 2021.

Preceding station	China Railway High-speed	Following station
Yandangshan towards Ningbo	Ningbo–Taizhou–Wenzhou railway	Yueqing towards Wenzhou South
