= Yueqing railway station =

Railway station in Wenzhou, China

Yueqing 乐清
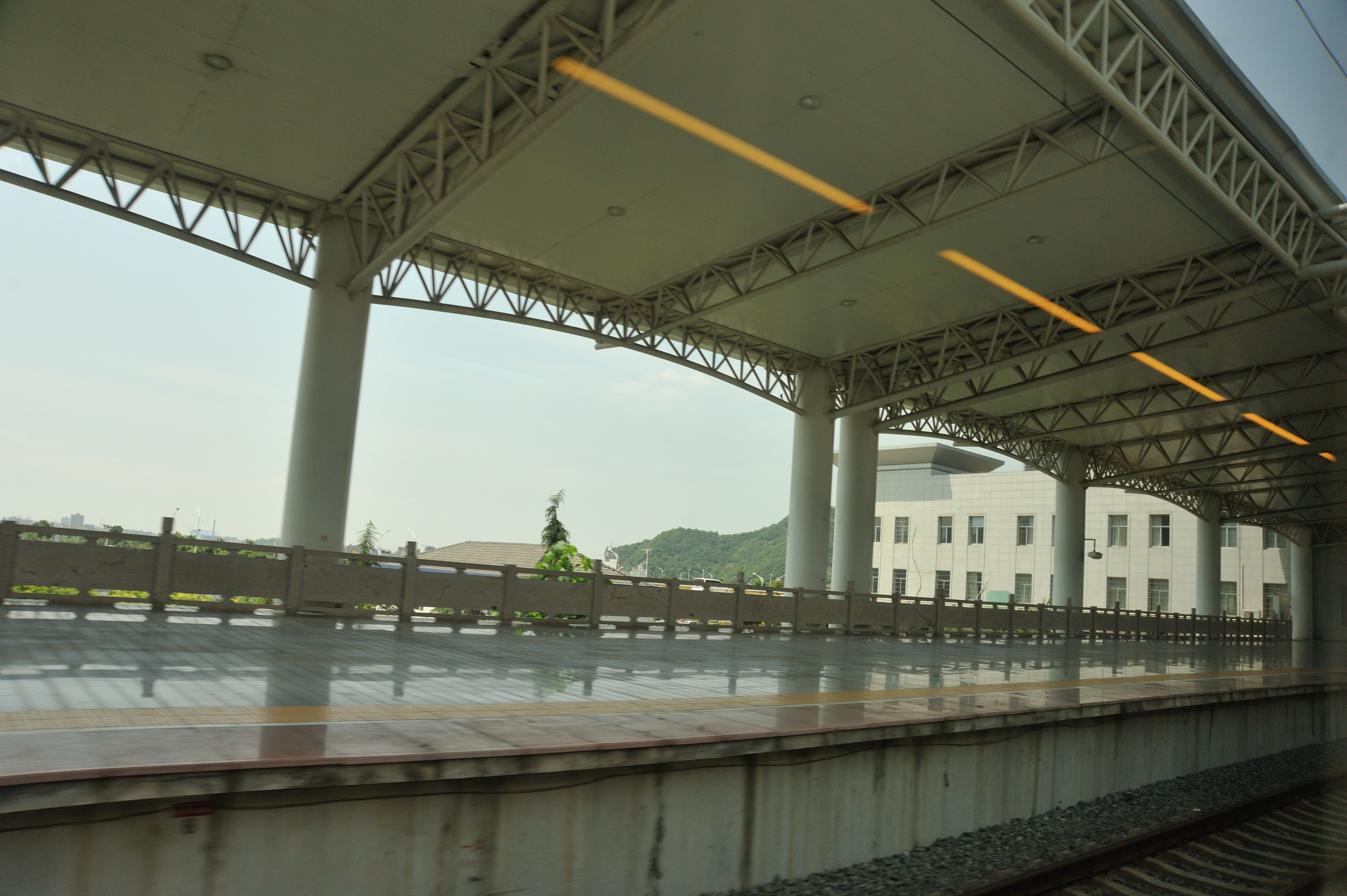
- Platform of Yueqing Railway Station

General information
- Location: China
- Coordinates: 28°5′16.64″N 120°51′19.24″E

Services
Preceding station	China Railway High-speed	Following station
Yueqing East towards Ningbo	Ningbo–Taizhou–Wenzhou railway	Yongjia towards Wenzhou South
Location

Yueqing railway station (Chinese: 乐清站) is a railway station located in Yueqing, Wenzhou, Zhejiang, China. It is on the Ningbo–Taizhou–Wenzhou railway, which forms part of the Hangzhou–Shenzhen railway.
