= Ningbo East railway station =

Railway station in Ningbo, China

Ningbodong 宁波东
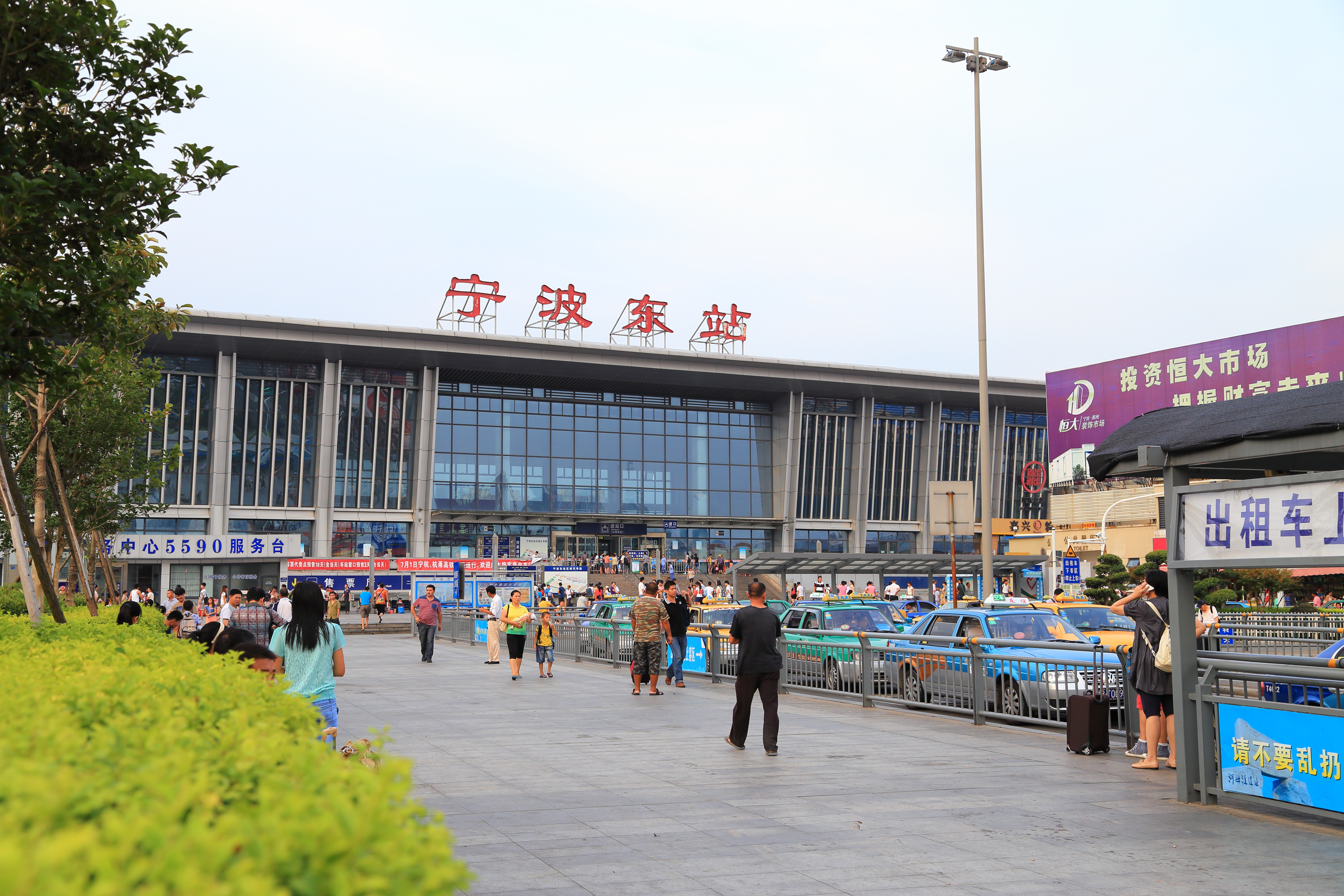

General information
- Other names: Ningbo East
- Location: Zhanqian Road, Yinzhou District, Ningbo, Zhejiang; China
- Coordinates: 29°51′45″N 121°32′13″E
- Operated by: China Railway Shanghai Group, China Railway Corporation
- Lines: Ningbo–Taizhou–Wenzhou railway; Xiaoshan–Ningbo railway; Ningbo–Zhoushan railway (U/C)
- Platforms: 3
- Connections: 9; Bus terminal

History
- Opened: 8 September 2010; 15 years ago
Location

Ningbo East railway station (simplified Chinese: 宁波东站; traditional Chinese: 寧波東站; pinyin: Níngbō dōngzhàn) is a railway station on the Ningbo–Taizhou–Wenzhou railway located in Yinzhou District, Ningbo, Zhejiang, China. It was originally built as a cargo station until the reconstruction of Ningbo railway station when Ningbo East railway station opened to passengers on 8 September 2010. Starting from 28 December 2013, the reconstruction of Ningbo railway station is finished, and the east railway station stopped opening for passengers and became an auxiliary station for examining, repairing and storing overnight trains.

== Traffic ==
South Sangtian Road was built as a major road connecting north and south Yinzhou as well as Ningbo East railway station.

== See also ==
- Ningbo railway station

Preceding station	China Railway High-speed	Following station
Ningbo Terminus	Ningbo–Taizhou–Wenzhou railway	Fenghua towards Wenzhou South
Ningbo towards Hangzhou East	Hangzhou–Fuzhou–Shenzhen railway	Fenghua towards Shenzhen North
