= Hangzhou–Wenzhou high-speed railway =

Railway line in China

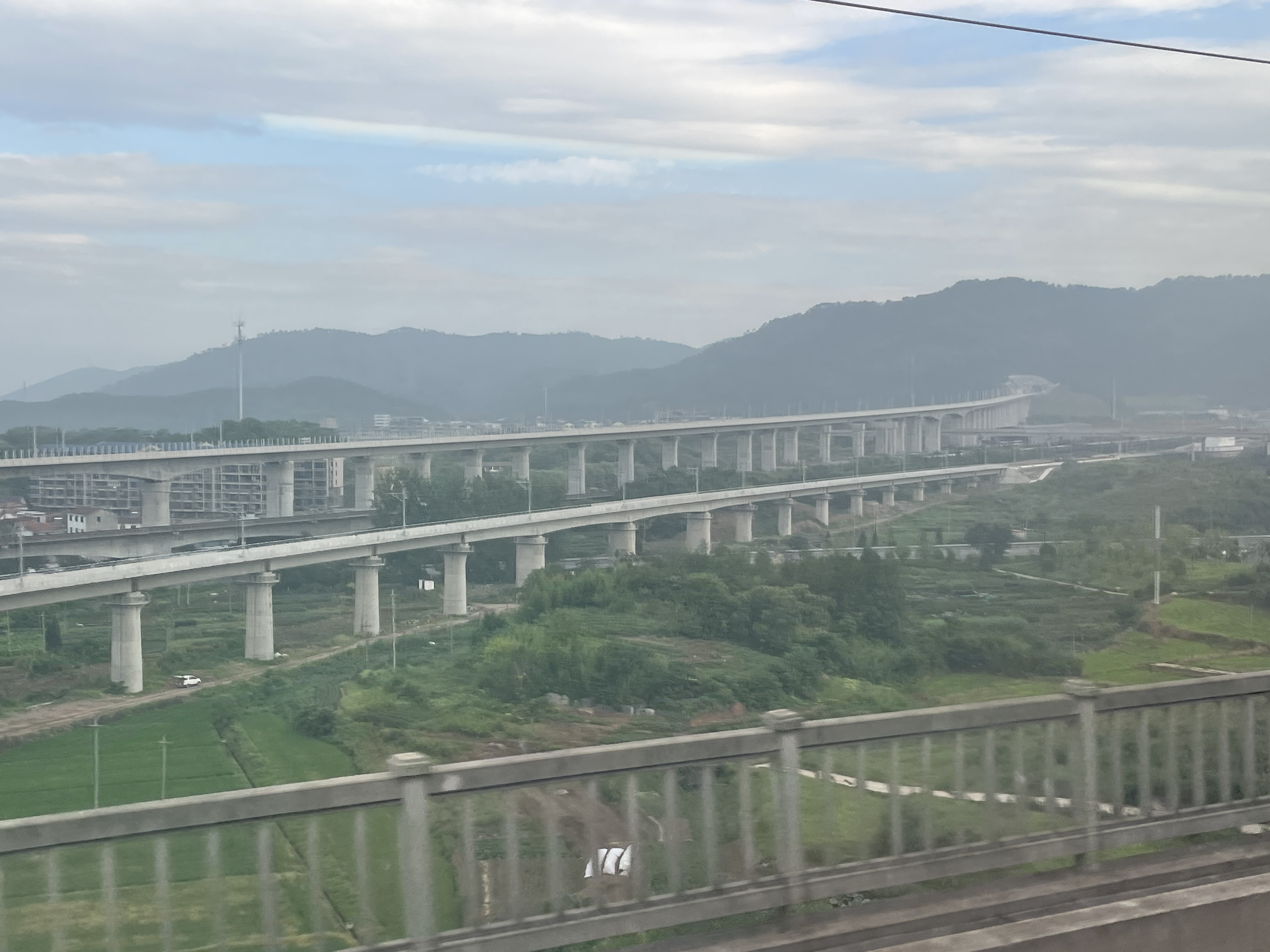
- The Yiwu section of the Hangzhou-Wenzhou HSR (behind) runs parallel with the Shanghai–Kunming Railway and the Ningbo–Jinhua railway (August 2023)

Overview
- Native name: 杭温高速铁路
- Status: Operational
- Owner: CR Shanghai
- Locale: Zhejiang province
- Termini: Hangzhou West; Wenzhou South
- Stations: 11

Service
- Type: High-speed rail
- System: China Railway High-speed
- Operator(s): Private SPV company

History
- Opened: 6 September 2024

Technical
- Line length: 331 km (206 mi)
- Track gauge: 1,435 mm (4 ft 8 1/2 in) standard gauge
- Electrification: 25 kV 50 Hz AC (Overhead line)
- Operating speed: 350 km/h (217 mph)
- Maximum incline: 2%

The Hangzhou–Wenzhou high-speed railway is a high-speed railway line in China. The line is 277 kilometres (172 mi) long and has a maximum speed of 350 kilometres per hour (220 mph). The new rail enhances connections and reduces travel time for cities in Zhejiang with Shanghai and Hangzhou, two major cities in China.

This line has started operations since 6 September 2024.

== Stations ==
- (through service to Hangzhou West)
- Tonglu East
- Pujiang
- Yiwu
- Hengdian, for connections to Hengdian World Studios
- Pan'an
- Xianju
- Nanxijiang
- Wenzhou North
- (through service to Wenzhou South)
