= Ninghai railway station =

Railway station in Ningbo, China

Coordinates: 29°20′12.48″N 121°25′12.01″E

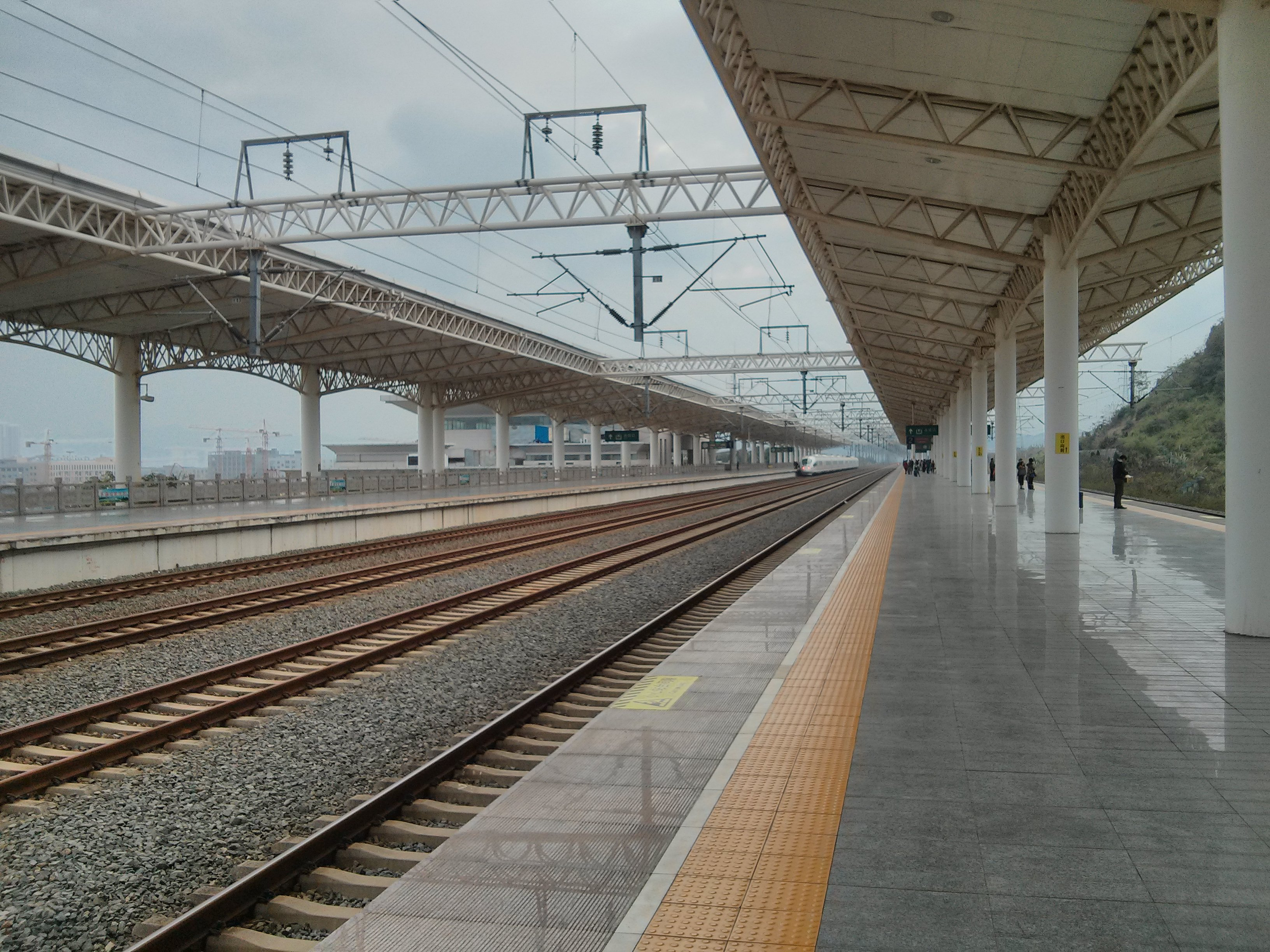
Ninghai Railway Station

Ninghai railway station is a railway station on the Ningbo–Taizhou–Wenzhou railway located in Ninghai County, Ningbo, Zhejiang, China.

Preceding station	China Railway High-speed	Following station
Fenghua towards Ningbo	Ningbo–Taizhou–Wenzhou railway	Sanmen County towards Wenzhou South
