= Line S1 (Taizhou Rail Transit) =

Metro line in Taizhou, Zhejiang, China

- S1
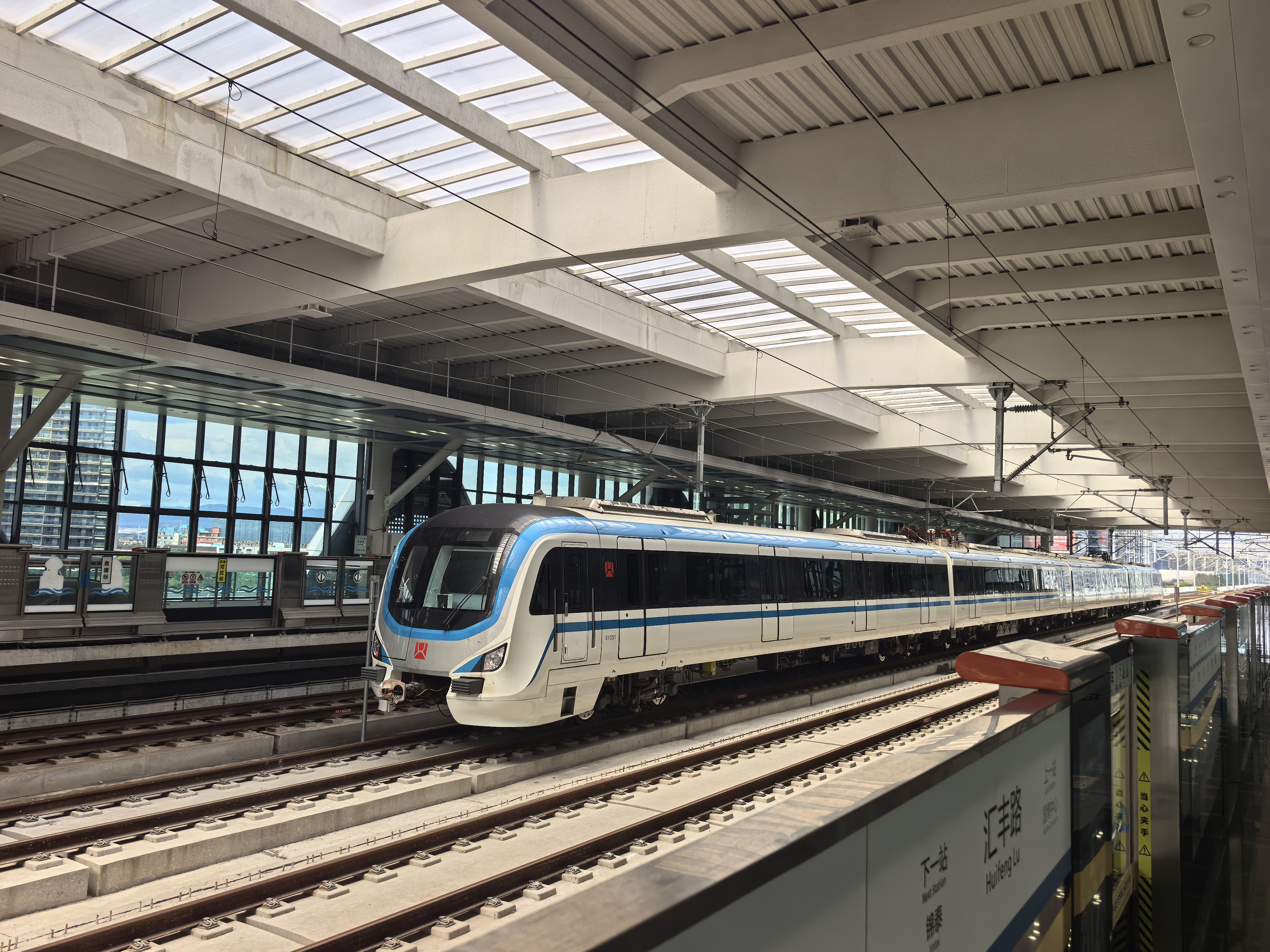
- An S1 train at Huifeng Lu station

Overview
- Locale: Taizhou, Zhejiang, China
- Termini: Taizhou Huochezhan; Chengnan
- Stations: 15

Service
- Type: Rapid transit
- System: Taizhou Rail Transit
- Operator(s): Taizhou Rail Transit Corporation

History
- Opened: 28 December 2022; 2 years ago

Technical
- Line length: 52.4 km (32.6 mi)
- Number of tracks: 2
- Character: Underground and Elevated
- Track gauge: 1,435 mm (4 ft 8 1/2 in)
- Electrification: Overhead lines, AC 25 kV 50 Hz
- Operating speed: 140 km/h (maximum speed)

Line S1 of the Taizhou Rail Transit (Chinese: 台州轨道交通S1线; pinyin: Tāizhōu Guǐdào Jiāotōng S-Yī Xiàn) is a suburban rapid transit line in Taizhou, Zhejiang Province, China. It runs from Taizhou Huochezhan to Chengnan. The line started operation on 28 December 2022. The line is 52.396 kilometres (32.557 mi) in length with 15 stations, including 7 underground stations and 8 elevated stations.

== Stations ==
Station name		Transfer	Distance km	Location
Pinyin	Chinese	Transfer	Distance km	Location
Taizhou Huochezhan	台州火车站			Jiaojiang
Xueyuan Lu	学院路			Jiaojiang
Guobo Zhongxin	国博中心			Jiaojiang
Huifeng Lu	汇丰路			Jiaojiang
Jintai	锦泰			Luqiao
Enze Yiyuan	恩泽医院			Luqiao
Taizhou Qiche Nanzhan	台州汽车南站			Luqiao
Zeguo	泽国			Wenling
Wenling Huochezhan	温岭火车站			Wenling
Huichuanwang	汇川王			Wenling
Wenling Di 1 Renmin Yiyuan	温岭第一人民医院			Wenling
Jiulong Dadao	九龙大道			Wenling
Wanchang Lu	万昌路			Wenling
Nanping	南屏			Wenling
Chengnan	城南			Wenling
