= Taizhou West railway station =

Railway station in Taizhou, China

Taizhou West 台州西
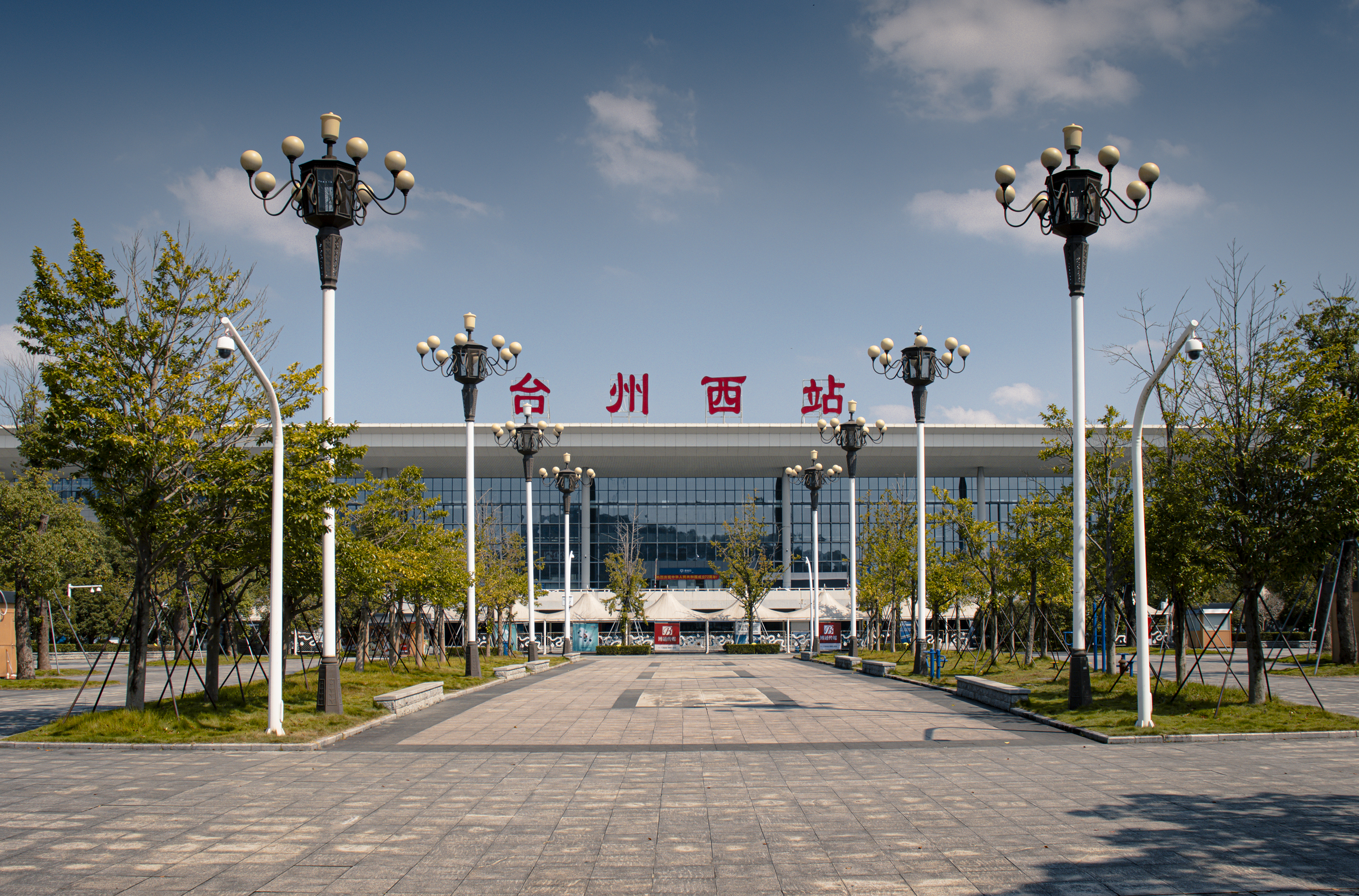
- Taizhou West railway station

General information
- Other names: Taizhou (2009-2020)
- Location: Huangyan District, Taizhou, Zhejiang; China
- Coordinates: 28°41′21″N 121°17′09″E
- Operated by: China Railway Shanghai Group, China Railway Corporation
- Lines: Ningbo–Taizhou–Wenzhou railway; Jinhua–Taizhou railway
- Platforms: 3

History
- Opened: 2009
Location

Taizhou West railway station (Chinese: 台州西站; pinyin: Tāizhōuxī Zhàn), is a railway station of Ningbo–Taizhou–Wenzhou railway and Jinhua–Taizhou railway located in Huangyan District, Taizhou, Zhejiang, China.

== History ==
The station opened on September 28, 2009. It was renamed from Taizhou to Taizhou West on 25 June 2021, coinciding with the opening of the Jinhua–Taizhou railway.

== Metro station ==
In the future, this station will be served by Line S2 of the Taizhou Rail Transit.

Preceding station	China Railway High-speed	Following station
Linhai towards Ningbo	Ningbo–Taizhou–Wenzhou railway	Wenling towards Wenzhou South
