= Tonglu East railway station =

Railway station in Hangzhou, Zhejiang

Tongludong 桐庐东

General information
- Location: Tonglu County, Hangzhou, Zhejiang; China
- Coordinates: 29°51′29.76″N 119°45′33.41″E
- Line(s): Shangqiu–Hangzhou high-speed railway (Huzhou–Hangzhou section); Hangzhou–Wenzhou high-speed railway (U/C)

History
- Opened: 22 September 2022
Location

Tonglu East railway station (Chinese: 桐庐东站) is a railway station in Tonglu County, Hangzhou, Zhejiang, China. It is an intermediate stop on the Shangqiu–Hangzhou high-speed railway (Huzhou–Hangzhou section) and will be the northern terminus of the under construction Hangzhou–Wenzhou high-speed railway.

== History ==
The structure was topped off in December 2021. It was opened on 22 September 2022.

== See also ==
- Tonglu railway station

Preceding station	China Railway High-speed	Following station
Fuyang West towards Shangqiu	Shangqiu–Hangzhou high-speed railway	Tonglu Terminus
