= Fenghua railway station =

Railway station in Ningbo, China

Coordinates: 29°37′49″N 121°27′37″E

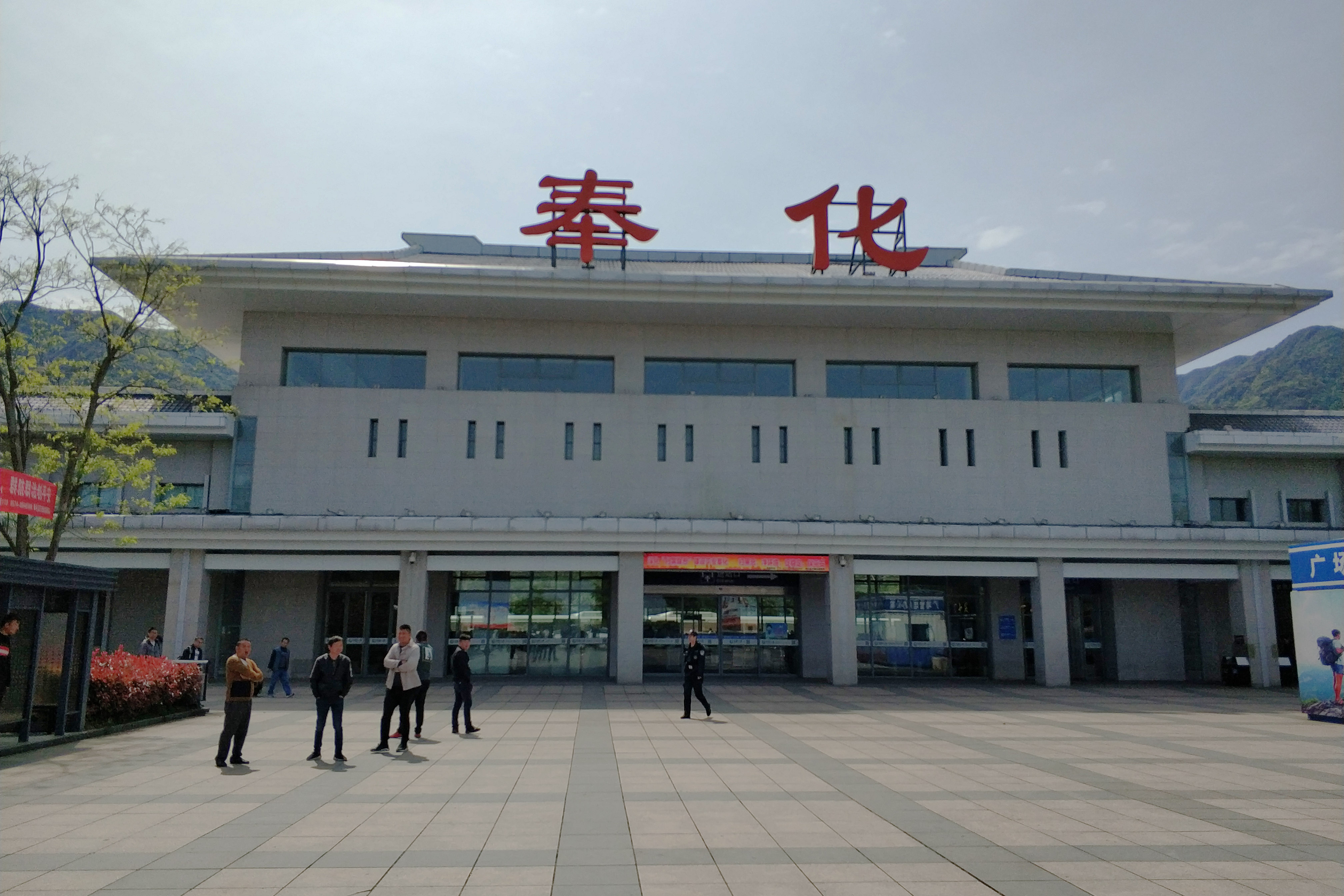
Fenghua Railway Station

Fenghua railway station (奉化站) is a railway station on the Ningbo–Taizhou–Wenzhou railway located in Fenghua District, Ningbo, Zhejiang, China.

Service was temporarily shut down in mid-2023 due to construction.

Preceding station	China Railway High-speed	Following station
Ningbo East towards Ningbo	Ningbo–Taizhou–Wenzhou railway	Ninghai towards Wenzhou South
