= Linhai =

Linhai 临海市
- County-level city
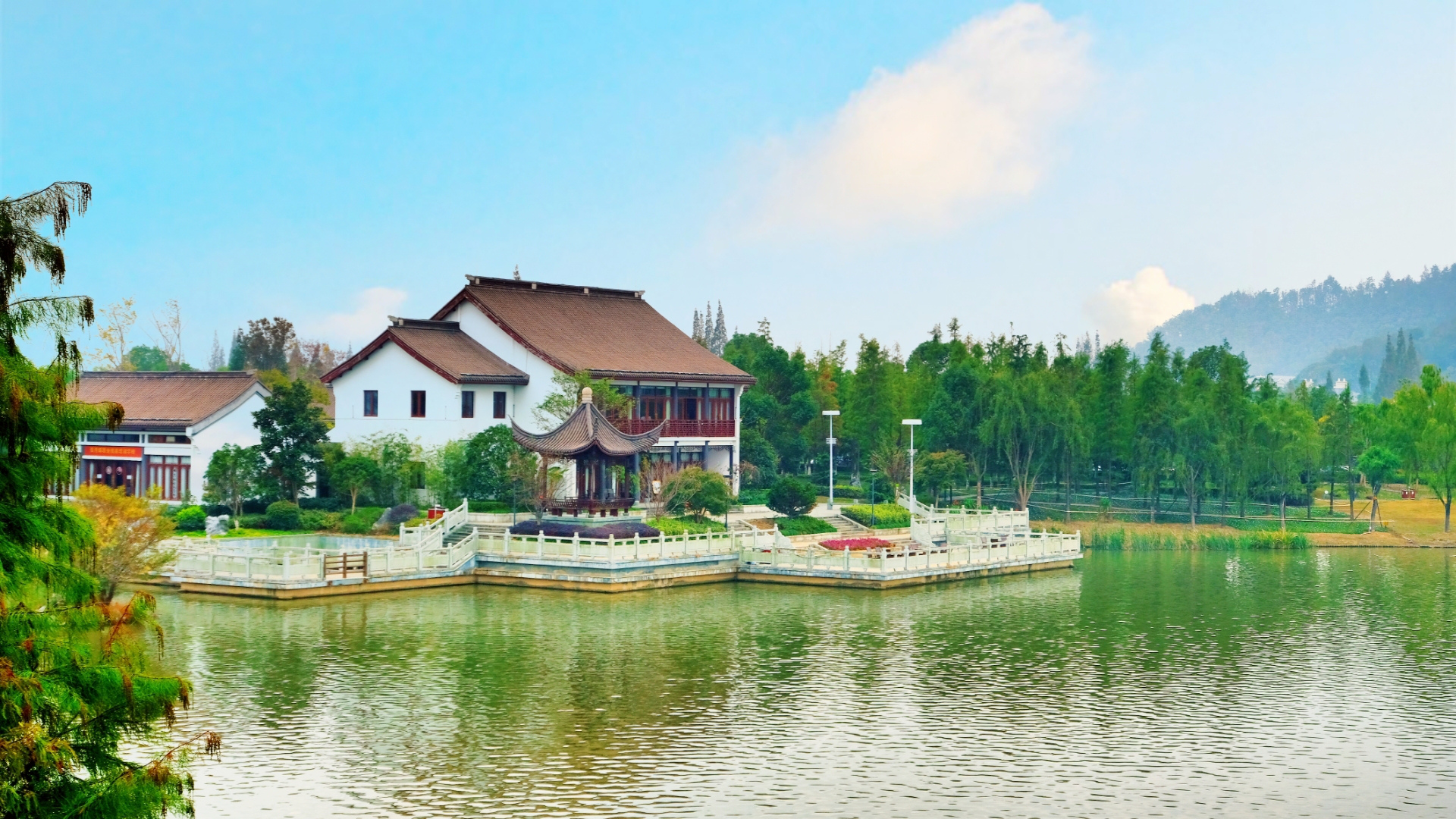
- Linghu Scenic Area, 2019

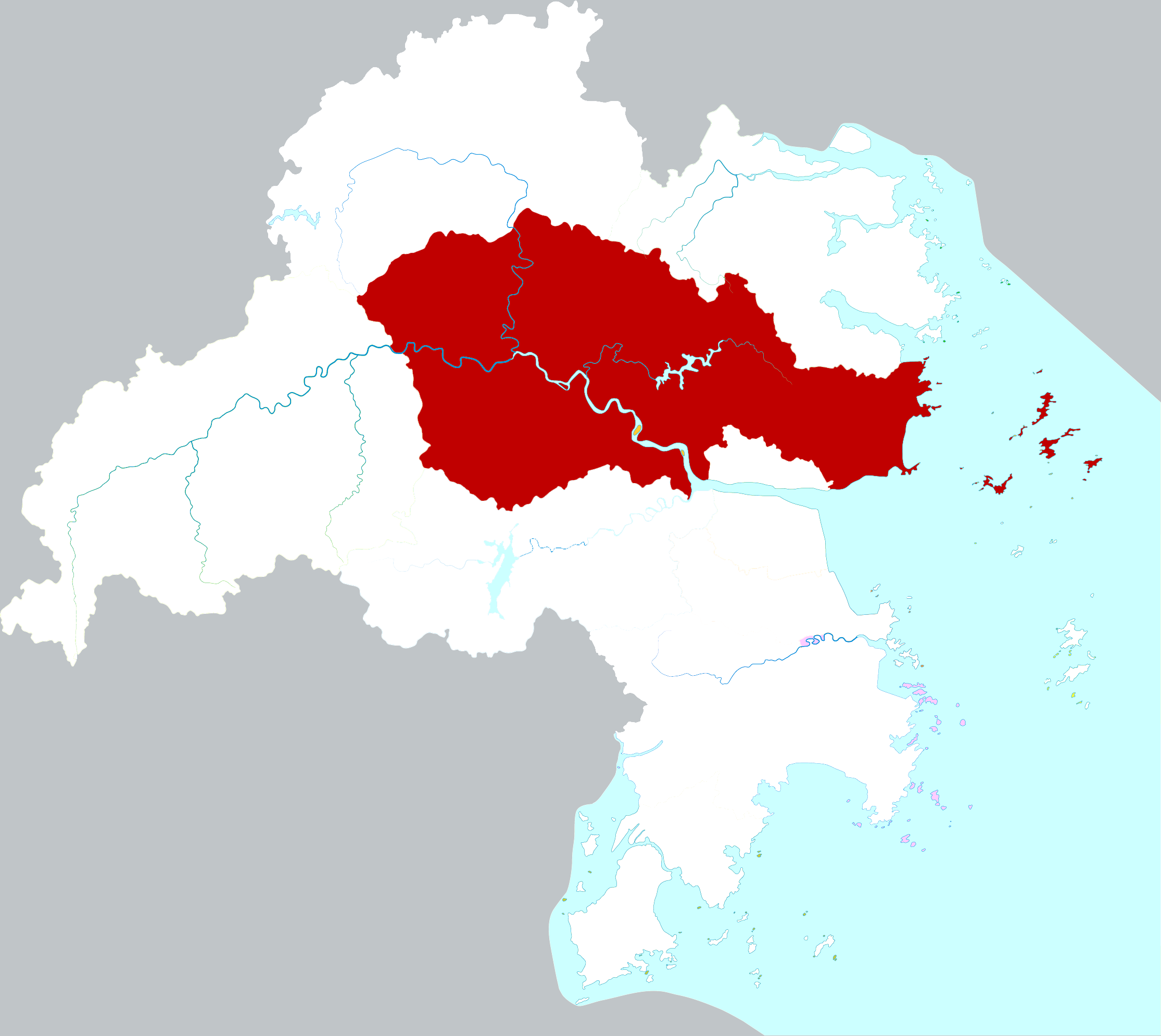
- Location of Linhai City within Taizhou

- Location in Zhejiang
- Coordinates: 28°51′N 121°07′E
- Country: People's Republic of China
- Province: Zhejiang
- Prefecture-level city: Taizhou

Area
  - County-level city: 2,171 km^{2} (838 sq mi)
  - Urban: 2,171 km^{2} (838 sq mi)
  - Metro: 2,171 km^{2} (838 sq mi)

Population (2020 census)
  - County-level city: 1,114,146
  - Density: 513.2/km^{2} (1,329/sq mi)
  - Urban: 1,114,146
  - Urban density: 513.2/km^{2} (1,329/sq mi)
  - Metro: 1,114,146
  - Metro density: 513.2/km^{2} (1,329/sq mi)
- Time zone: UTC+8 (China Standard)
- Website: www.linhai.gov.cn/col/col1523199/index.html

Linhai (simplified Chinese: 临海; traditional Chinese: 臨海; pinyin: Línhǎi; Tai-chow dialect: Lin-he) is a county-level city in Taizhou, Zhejiang province, situated on the banks of the Lin River in Eastern China.

As of the 2020 census, its population was 1,114,146.

Its Cathedral of the Sacred Heart of Jesus is the episcopal see of the Roman Catholic Diocese of Linhai.

== History and sights ==
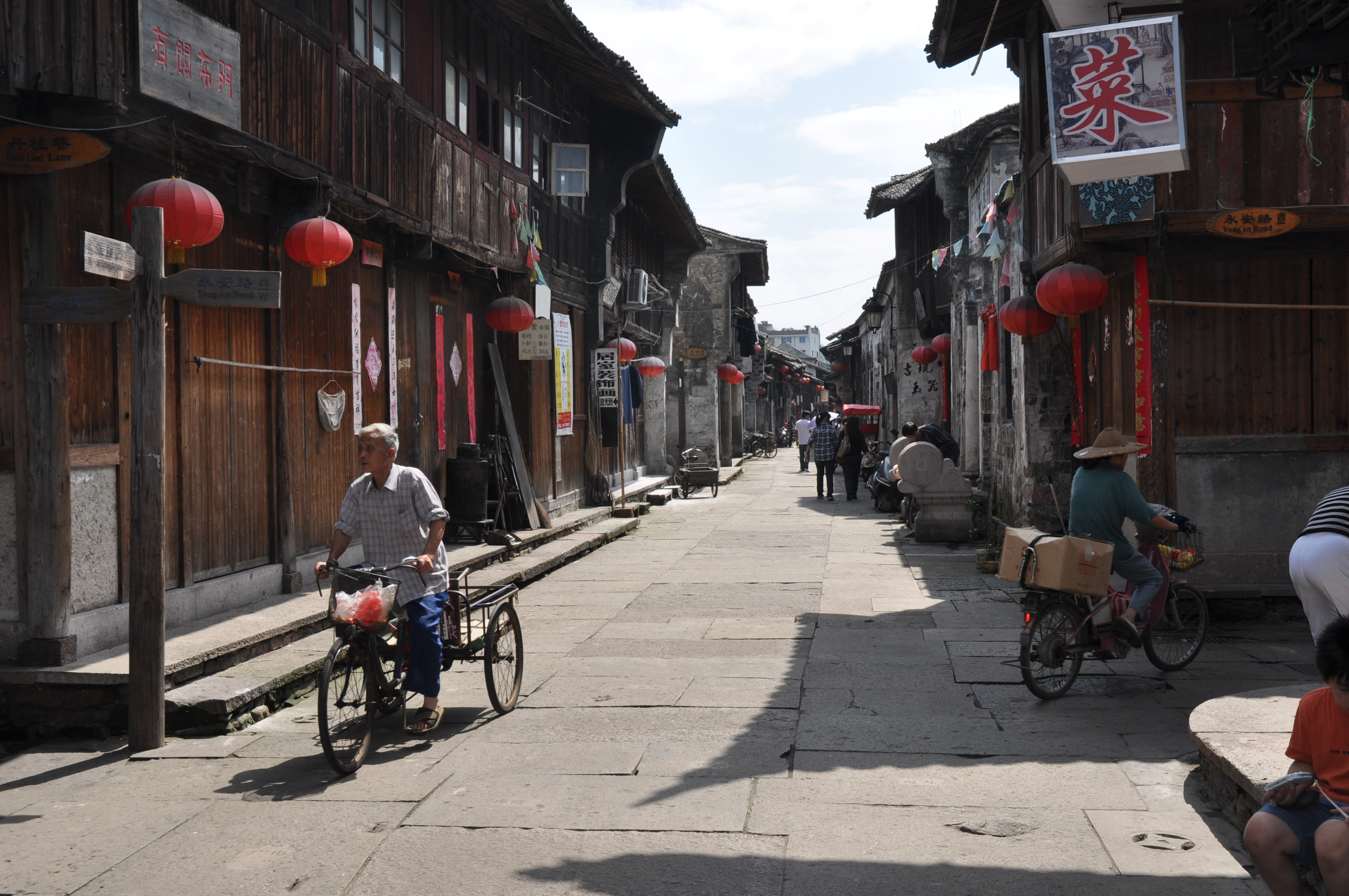
Ziyang ancient street

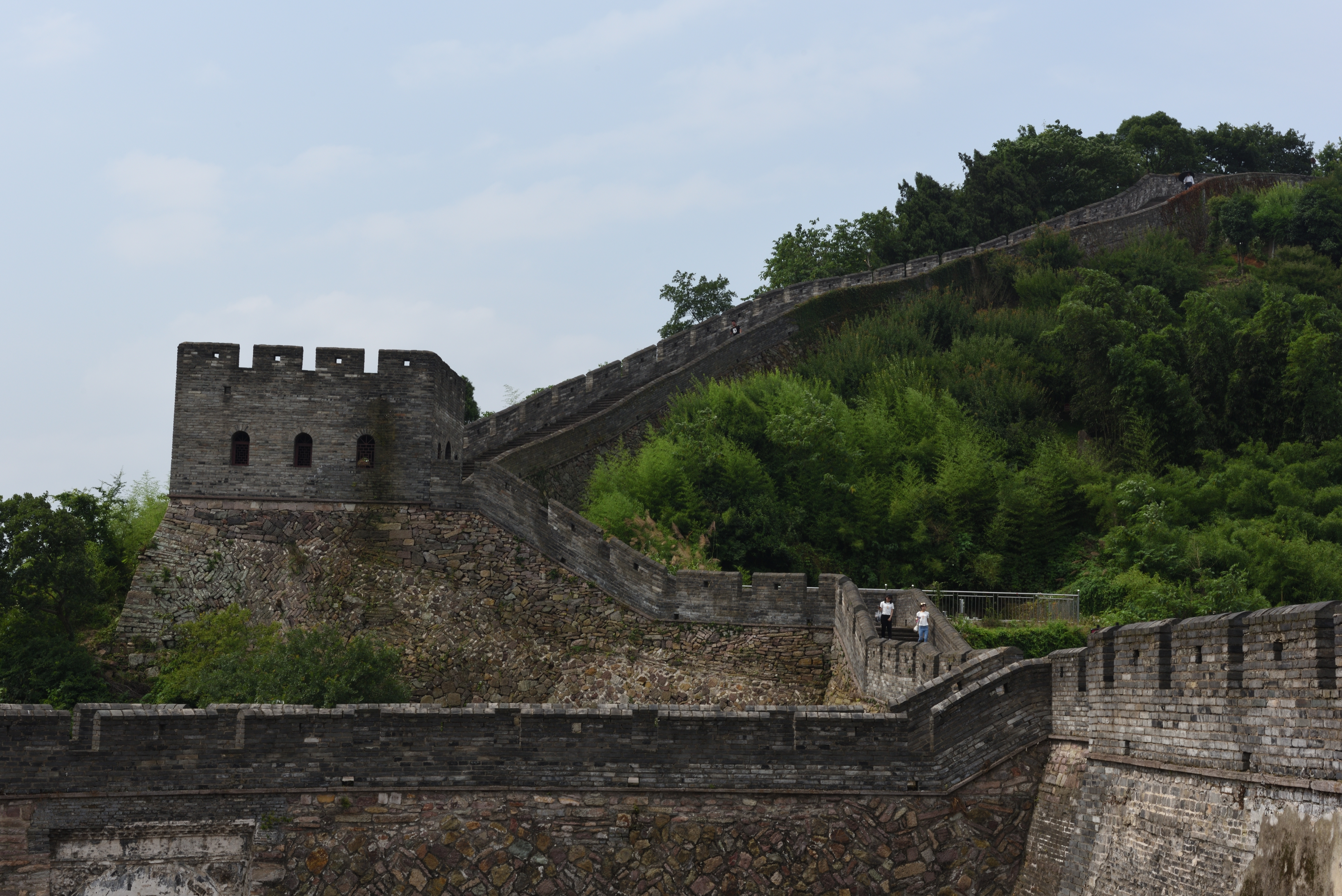
Linhai Ancient City Wall, dubbed the "Great Wall of Jiangnan"

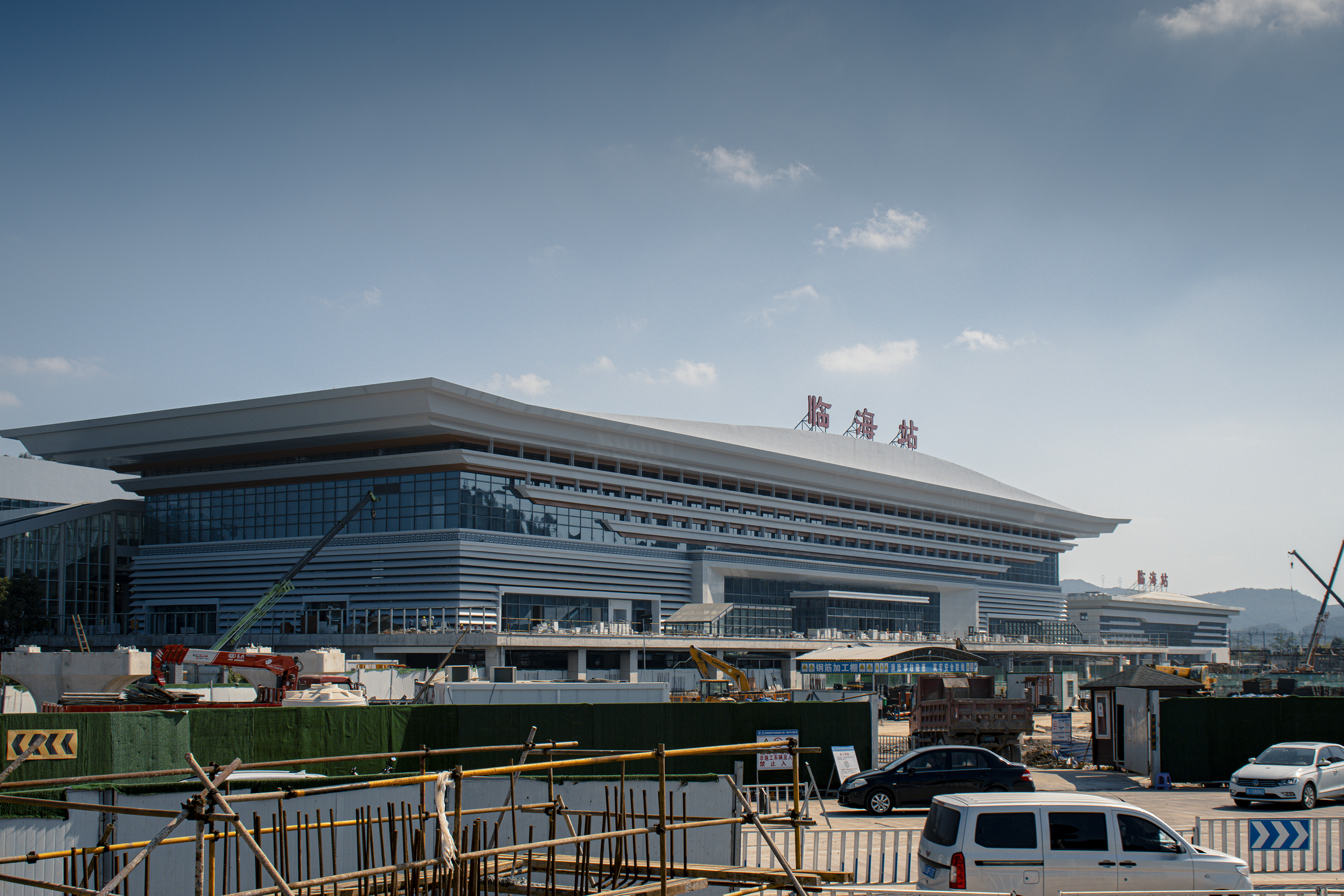
Linhai Railway Station

Its wall attracts many tourists. Construction of the wall, originally over 6 kilometres (3.7 miles) long, began in the Jin Dynasty (266–420) and was not finished until the Sui (581–618) and Tang (618–907) Dynasties. The northern portion, along a high ridge, and the western & southern portions, along the Lin River, still exist and are in good condition.

== Administrative divisions ==
Subdistricts:

- Gucheng Subdistrict (古城街道), Dayang Subdistrict (大洋街道), Jiangnan Subdistrict (江南街道), Datian Subdistrict (大田街道), Shaojiadu Subdistrict (邵家渡街道)

Towns:

- Xunqiao (汛桥镇), Dongcheng (东塍镇), Xiaozhi (小芝镇), Taozhu (桃渚镇), Shangpan (上盘镇), Duqiao (杜桥镇), Yongquan (涌泉镇), Youxi (尤溪镇), Hetou (河头镇), Yanjiang (沿江镇), Kuocang (括苍镇), Yongfeng (永丰镇), Huixi (汇溪镇), Baishuiyang (白水洋镇)

== Climate ==
Climate data for Linhai, elevation 7 m (23 ft), (1991–2020 normals, extremes 1981–present)
| Month | Jan | Feb | Mar | Apr | May | Jun | Jul | Aug | Sep | Oct | Nov | Dec | Year |
|---|---|---|---|---|---|---|---|---|---|---|---|---|---|
| Record high °C (°F) | 24.4 (75.9) | 29.9 (85.8) | 31.2 (88.2) | 35.8 (96.4) | 37.0 (98.6) | 39.0 (102.2) | 41.3 (106.3) | 39.8 (103.6) | 38.4 (101.1) | 36.3 (97.3) | 30.7 (87.3) | 26.0 (78.8) | 41.3 (106.3) |
| Mean daily maximum °C (°F) | 11.6 (52.9) | 13.7 (56.7) | 17.2 (63.0) | 22.9 (73.2) | 27.0 (80.6) | 29.6 (85.3) | 34.1 (93.4) | 33.4 (92.1) | 29.6 (85.3) | 25.2 (77.4) | 19.8 (67.6) | 14.1 (57.4) | 23.2 (73.7) |
| Daily mean °C (°F) | 6.9 (44.4) | 8.5 (47.3) | 11.9 (53.4) | 17.1 (62.8) | 21.8 (71.2) | 25.1 (77.2) | 28.9 (84.0) | 28.4 (83.1) | 25.0 (77.0) | 20.1 (68.2) | 14.8 (58.6) | 9.0 (48.2) | 18.1 (64.6) |
| Mean daily minimum °C (°F) | 3.5 (38.3) | 4.9 (40.8) | 8.1 (46.6) | 12.9 (55.2) | 18.0 (64.4) | 22.0 (71.6) | 25.1 (77.2) | 25.0 (77.0) | 21.7 (71.1) | 16.3 (61.3) | 11.2 (52.2) | 5.3 (41.5) | 14.5 (58.1) |
| Record low °C (°F) | −6.4 (20.5) | −5.2 (22.6) | −4.9 (23.2) | 0.1 (32.2) | 7.7 (45.9) | 12.4 (54.3) | 17.7 (63.9) | 17.8 (64.0) | 12.3 (54.1) | 1.9 (35.4) | −1.3 (29.7) | −6.0 (21.2) | −6.4 (20.5) |
| Average precipitation mm (inches) | 65.8 (2.59) | 59.9 (2.36) | 127.2 (5.01) | 111.8 (4.40) | 145.0 (5.71) | 245.5 (9.67) | 200.0 (7.87) | 326.4 (12.85) | 183.6 (7.23) | 80.9 (3.19) | 69.2 (2.72) | 55.4 (2.18) | 1,670.7 (65.78) |
| Average precipitation days (≥ 0.1 mm) | 11.8 | 12.4 | 16.6 | 15.2 | 16.1 | 18.8 | 14.3 | 16.7 | 13.0 | 7.7 | 10.0 | 9.4 | 162 |
| Average snowy days | 1.9 | 1.3 | 0.4 | 0 | 0 | 0 | 0 | 0 | 0 | 0 | 0 | 0.7 | 4.3 |
| Average relative humidity (%) | 73 | 74 | 75 | 75 | 77 | 82 | 78 | 79 | 78 | 74 | 75 | 72 | 76 |
| Mean monthly sunshine hours | 104.8 | 102.8 | 120.7 | 139.8 | 139.0 | 111.3 | 210.3 | 199.2 | 157.4 | 163.3 | 119.1 | 122.5 | 1,690.2 |
| Percentage possible sunshine | 32 | 32 | 32 | 36 | 33 | 27 | 49 | 49 | 43 | 46 | 37 | 38 | 38 |
Source: China Meteorological Administration All-time October high

== Sources and external links ==
- GCatholic - Catholic see
