= Hangzhou–Taizhou high-speed railway =

High speed rail line in China

Hangzhou–Taizhou high-speed railway 杭台高速铁路

Overview
- Status: In operation
- Locale: Zhejiang Province, China
- Termini: Hangzhou East; Yuhuan
- Stations: 12

Service
- Operator: China Railway Shanghai Group

History
- Opened: 8 January 2022

Technical
- Line length: 267 km (166 mi)
- Track gauge: 1,435 mm (4 ft 8 1/2 in)
- Operating speed: 350 km/h (217 mph)

The Hangzhou–Taizhou high-speed railway is a high-speed railway in China. It was opened on 8 January 2022.

== Description ==
The railway does not parallel any existing railway.

The railway is the first privately funded Chinese high-speed railway, while a consortium led by Fosun Group provided 51% of the funds.

=== Features ===
Xiaobeishan tunnel, a 596-metre (1,955 ft) long single-bore quadruple track tunnel. The Hangzhou–Taizhou high-speed railway uses the inner two tracks.

The 18.23-kilometre (11.33-mile) Dongming Tunnel is the longest high-speed railway tunnel in East China.

Jiaojiang Bridge over Jiao River is a cable-stayed bridge with a total length of 5,253 metres (17,234 ft), a main span of 480 metres (1,570 ft) and a 194-metre (636 ft) high central pylon.

=== Stations ===
It has the following stations:

Station Name	Chinese	Metro transfers/connections
Hangzhou East	杭州东	1 4 6 19
Hangzhou South	杭州南	5
Shaoxing North	绍兴北	
Shangyu South	上虞南	
Shengzhou North	嵊州北	
Shengzhou Xinchang	嵊州新昌	
Tiantaishan	天台山	
Linhai	临海	
Taizhou	台州	
Wenling	温岭	
Wenling West	温岭西	
Yuhuan	玉环	
