= Huangyan, Taizhou =

Huangyan 黄岩区 Hwangyen
- District
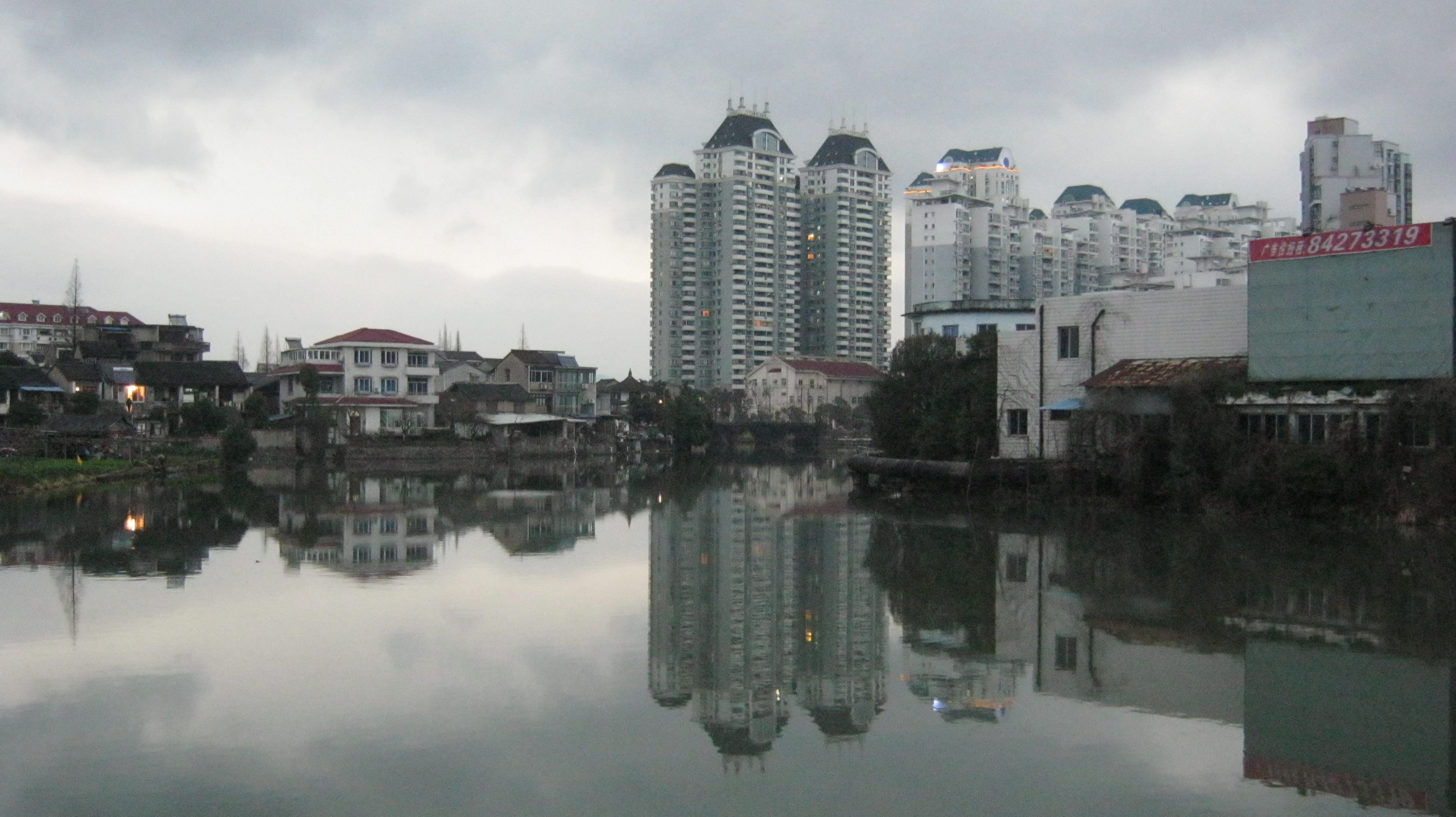

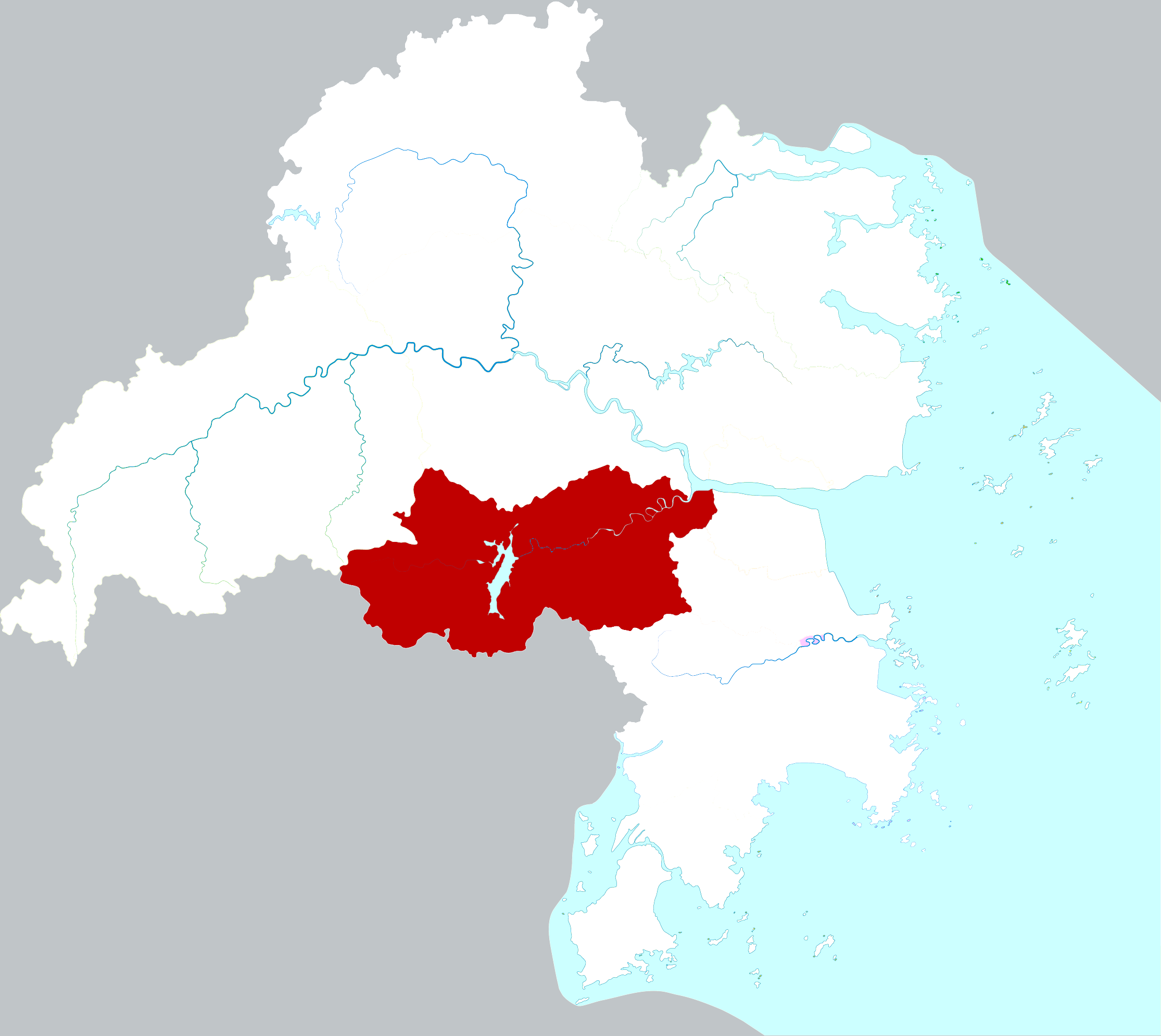
- Location of Huangyan District within Taizhou

- Location in Zhejiang
- Coordinates: 28°39′N 121°15′E
- Country: People's Republic of China
- Province: Zhejiang
- Prefecture-level city: Taizhou

Area
  - Total: 988 km^{2} (381 sq mi)

Population
  - Total: 570,000
  - Density: 580/km^{2} (1,500/sq mi)
- Time zone: UTC+8 (China Standard)
- Postal code: 318020
- Area code: 0576
- Website: www.zjhy.gov.cn

Huangyan (Huangyan; Tai-chow dialect: Wông-ngæn K'ü; simplified Chinese: 黄岩区; traditional Chinese: 黃巖區; pinyin: Huángyán Qū) is a district of Taizhou, a city in Zhejiang Province, China. Huangyan has an area of 988 km^{2} (381 sq mi) and a population of approximately 570,000. It has an average annual precipitation of 1,676 mm (66.0 in) and an annual average temperature of 17 °C.

== History ==
In 1989, Huangyan County was upgraded to a county-level city. As of 1990 census, the population of Huangyuan City was 888,631.

In 1994, Taizhou City was upgraded to a prefecture-level city, correspondingly Huangyan City was amalgamated in Taizhou City, and divided into two districts as Huangyan and Luqiao.

== Administrative divisions ==
Subdistricts:

- Dongcheng Subdistrict (东城街道), Xicheng Subdistrict (西城街道), Nancheng Subdistrict (南城街道), Beicheng Subdistrict (北城街道), Chengjiang Subdistrict (澄江街道), Xinqian Subdistrict (新前街道), Jiangkou Subdistrict (江口街道), Gaoqiao, Taizhou (高桥街道)

Towns:

- Ningxi (宁溪镇), Beiyang (北洋镇), Toutuo (头陀镇), Yuanqiao (院桥镇), Shabu (沙埠镇)

Townships:

- Fushan Township (富山乡), Shangzheng Township (上郑乡), Yutou Township (屿头乡), Shangyang Township (上垟乡), Maoshe Township (茅畲乡), Pingtian Township (平田乡)

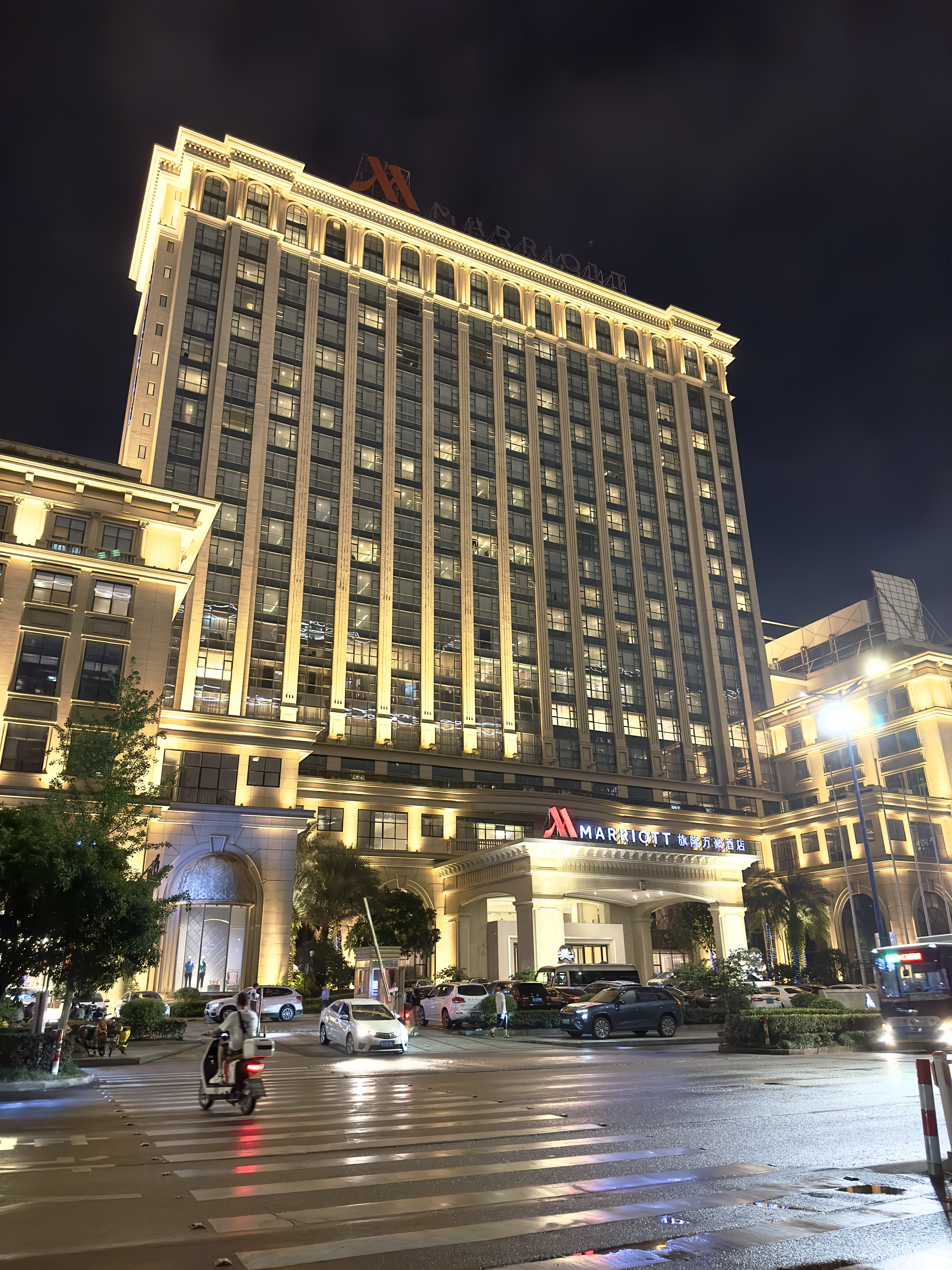
Taizhou Marriott Hotel in Huangyan District, Taizhou, Zhejiang province, China, shot on June 5, 2023, on iPhone 14 Pro Max

== Features of Huangyan ==
=== Orange cultivation ===
Huangyan is renowned for its cultivation of Mandarin Oranges, a tradition with deep historical roots. The region is known for being the birthplace of various types of oranges that are enjoyed worldwide. Huangyan stands out as a leading area for mandarin orange cultivation in China, annually exporting a significant quantity of produce globally.

=== Mold production ===
Huangyan is recognized as a significant plastic mold manufacturing hub in China. The region boasts expertise in seven precision mold tooling categories, spanning automobile, motorcycle, electric bike, home appliances, audio and video equipment, pipe fittings, medical supplies, and chemicals. As of 2006 statistics, Huangyan dominated the domestic market, producing 70% of plastic molds nationwide. Huangyan has evolved into a pivotal mold tooling center in China, experiencing rapid growth in exporting to overseas markets.

A substantial portion of TV manufacturers, approximately 50%, opt to source TV molds from Huangyan. Moreover, 70% of electric bike plastic parts originate from this region. Key automotive manufacturers like FAW, Geely, Dongfeng, and Shanghai Volkswagen rely on Huangyan for their mold requirements. Additionally, prominent home appliance manufacturers such as Haier, Konka, Changhong, Hisense, Royalstar, and Xoceco also utilize molds from Huangyan.
