= Yuhuan railway station =

Railway station in China

Yuhuan 玉环
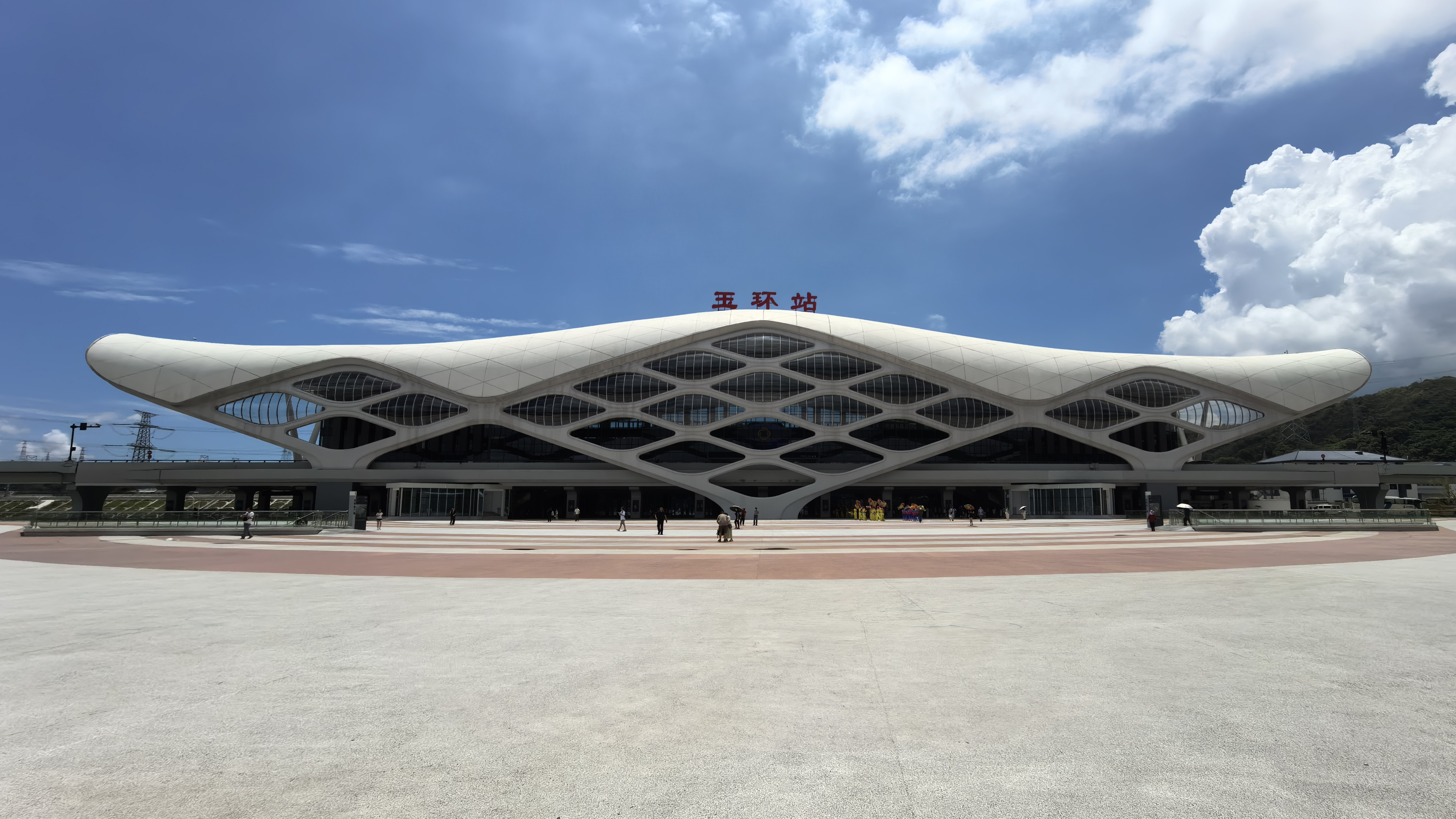
- Station building

General information
- Location: Lupu, Yuhuan, Taizhou, Zhejiang; China
- Line: Hangzhou–Taizhou high-speed railway
Location

Yuhuan railway station (Chinese: 玉环站) is a planned railway station in Yuhuan, Taizhou, Zhejiang, China. It will be the southern terminus of the Hangzhou–Taizhou high-speed railway. The station is expected to start construction in March 2022 and open in September 2025 with the Wenling-Yuhuan section of Hangzhou-Taizhou high-speed railway.

Preceding station	China Railway High-speed	Following station
Wenling West towards Hangzhou East	Hangzhou–Taizhou high-speed railway	Terminus
