= Ningbo–Taizhou–Wenzhou railway =

Railway line in China

Hangzhou–Fuzhou–Shenzhen high-speed railway Ningbo–Taizhou–Wenzhou Section
- China Railway High-speed logo
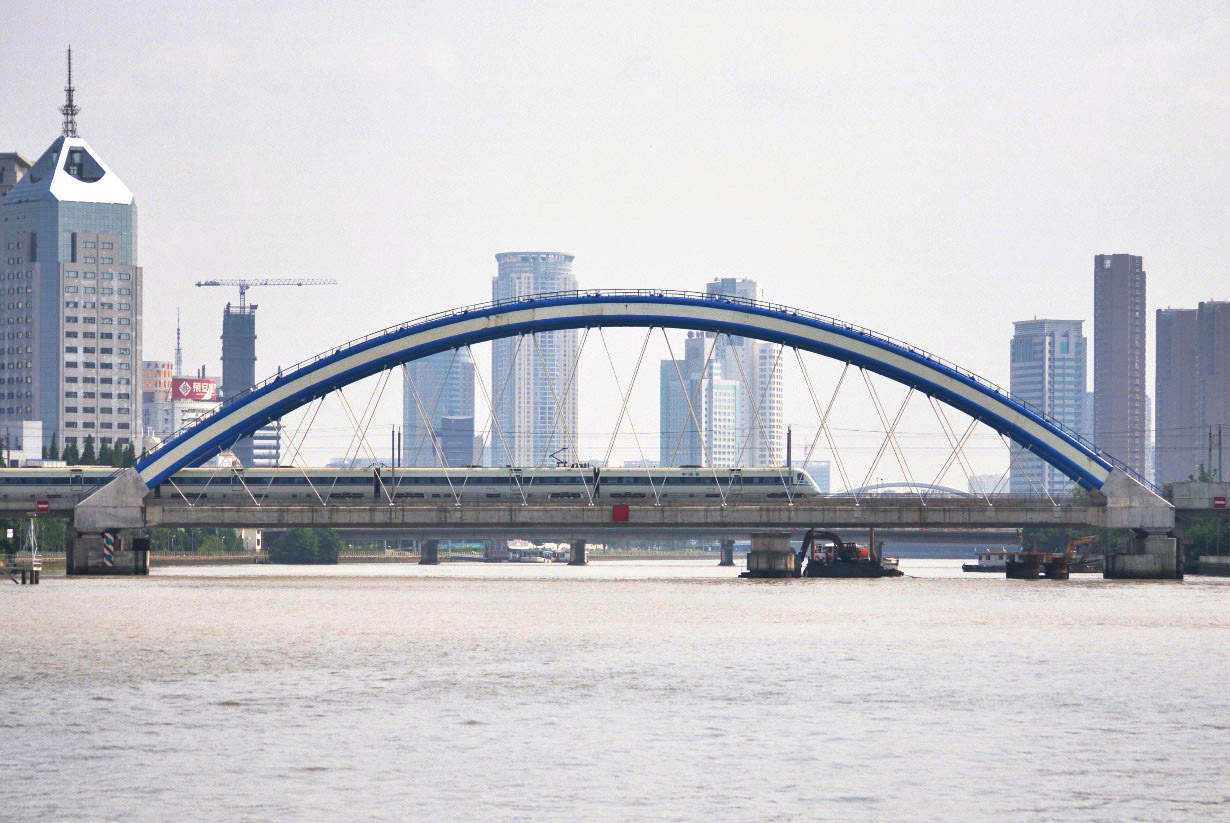
- Yongtaiwen Railway Bridge over the Fenghua River

Overview
- Native name: 杭福深高速铁路甬台温段
- Status: Operational
- Owner: CR Shanghai
- Termini: Ningbo; Wenzhou South
- Stations: 15 (12 active)

Service
- Type: High-speed rail Heavy rail
- System: China Railway High-speed
- Operator: CR Shanghai

Technical
- Line length: 275 km (171 mi)
- Track gauge: 1,435 mm (4 ft 8 1/2 in) standard gauge
- Electrification: 25 kV 50 Hz AC (Overhead line)

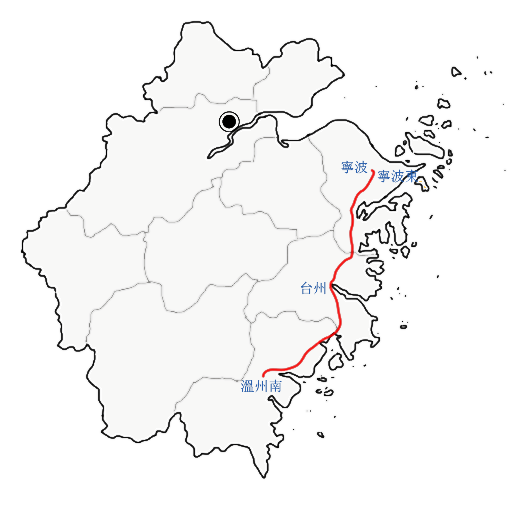
The Ningbo–Taizhou–Wenzhou railway on the coast of Zhejiang Province

The Ningbo–Taizhou–Wenzhou railway or Yong-Tai-Wen railway (simplified Chinese: 甬台温铁路; traditional Chinese: 甬台溫鐵路; pinyin: Yǒng Tāi Wēn Tiělù) is a dual-track, electrified, high-speed rail line in Zhejiang Province, China. It is named after the three prefecture-level cities along route: Ningbo, whose abbreviated Chinese name is Yong, Taizhou and Wenzhou. The line has a total length of 282.4 kilometres (175.5 mi) and forms part of Hangzhou–Fuzhou–Shenzhen railway. Construction began in October 2005, and the line opened to commercial service on September 28, 2009. Trains running on the line reach top speeds of 250 kilometres per hour, and the shortest trip between Ningbo and Wenzhou takes 1 hour 12 minutes.

== Route ==
The Ningbo–Taizhou–Wenzhou railway follows the rugged but prosperous coast of Zhejiang. Major cities and counties along route include Fenghua, Ninghai, Sanmen, Linhai, Taizhou, Huangyan, Luqiao, Wenling, Yueqing, Yongjia, and Ouhai. At Ningbo, the line joins the Xiaoshan–Ningbo railway and the Hangzhou–Ningbo passenger-dedicated line. At Wenzhou, the line joins the Wenzhou–Fuzhou railway.

== History ==
The Ningbo–Taizhou–Wenzhou railway is the first railway to be built on the east coast of Zhejiang. Most high-speed rail lines in China follow the routes of older conventional railroads, but there were no railways on the southeast coast prior to the building of high-speed rail. Historically, the southeast coastal region relied on maritime transportation, and rugged terrain made railway construction more expensive. In the first half of the 20th century, warfare and political instability delayed railway construction. During the Cold War, the southeast coast faced the threat of invasion from Republic of China on Taiwan and all railways were built inland. Only when political tensions across the Taiwan Strait eased in the late 1990s did planning of the Yongtaiwen Line proceed. Construction began commenced in 2005 and track-laying was completed on May 15, 2009. Commercial service began on September 28, 2009.

== Accident ==
On 23 July 2011, CRH train D3115, running from Hangzhou to Fuzhou South came to a halt over a viaduct near Wenzhou South after losing its power. Shortly afterwards, CRH train D301, running from Beijing South to Fuzhou, rear-ended the stationary D3115. The accident led to 40 deaths and 200+ injured, raising concerns about the safety of the fast-expanding high-speed railway network of China.

== Rail connections ==
- Ningbo: Xiaoshan–Ningbo railway
- Wenzhou: Wenzhou–Fuzhou railway, Jinhua–Wenzhou railway

== See also ==
- List of railways in China
