= Zhuangqiao railway station =

Railway station in Ningbo, China

Coordinates: 29°55′43″N 121°31′56″E

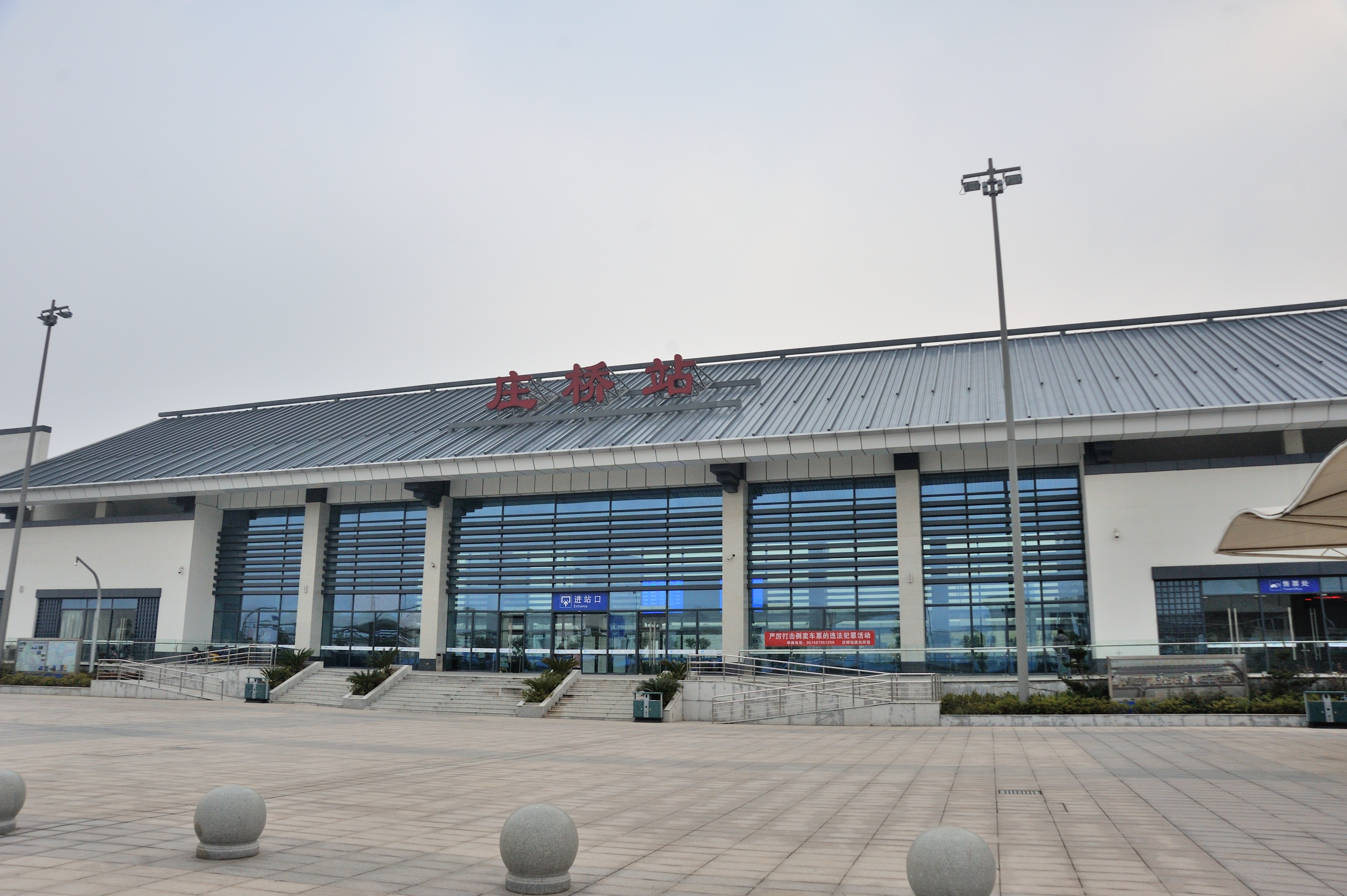
Front view of Zhuangqiao Railway Station

Zhuangqiao railway station (simplified Chinese: 庄桥站; traditional Chinese: 莊橋站; pinyin: Zhuāngqiáo Zhàn) is a railway station on the Hangzhou–Ningbo high-speed railway located in Jiangbei District, Ningbo, Zhejiang, China.

== History ==
Zhuangqiao railway station was originally constructed in 1912 as a station on Xiaoshan-Ningbo railway. In 1938, to hinder the advance of Japanese forces, laborers dismantled the tracks of the Xiaoshan-Ningbo railway, which effectively stopped all train services at the station.

The reconstruction of the railway began in 1953, and the station resumed operations in December 1955. Due to technical difficulties of building a bridge across Yao River at the time, Zhuangqiao railway station served as the temporary terminus of Xiaoshan-Ningbo railway from 1955 to 1957. After the completion of the bridge, the terminus shifted to Ningbo railway station. Gradually, Zhuangqiao railway station transitioned to handling only freight operations.

In 2009, the construction of the Hangzhou–Ningbo high-speed railway upgraded the station to a high-speed rail facility. Passenger services resumed in July 2013 with high-speed rail operations. The station was designed with 2 platforms and 4 tracks, with plans for future expansion to 6 platforms and 8 tracks. Its 3,200-square-meter station building can accommodate up to 800 passengers.

== Metro station ==
The station is served by Line 4 of Ningbo Rail Transit.

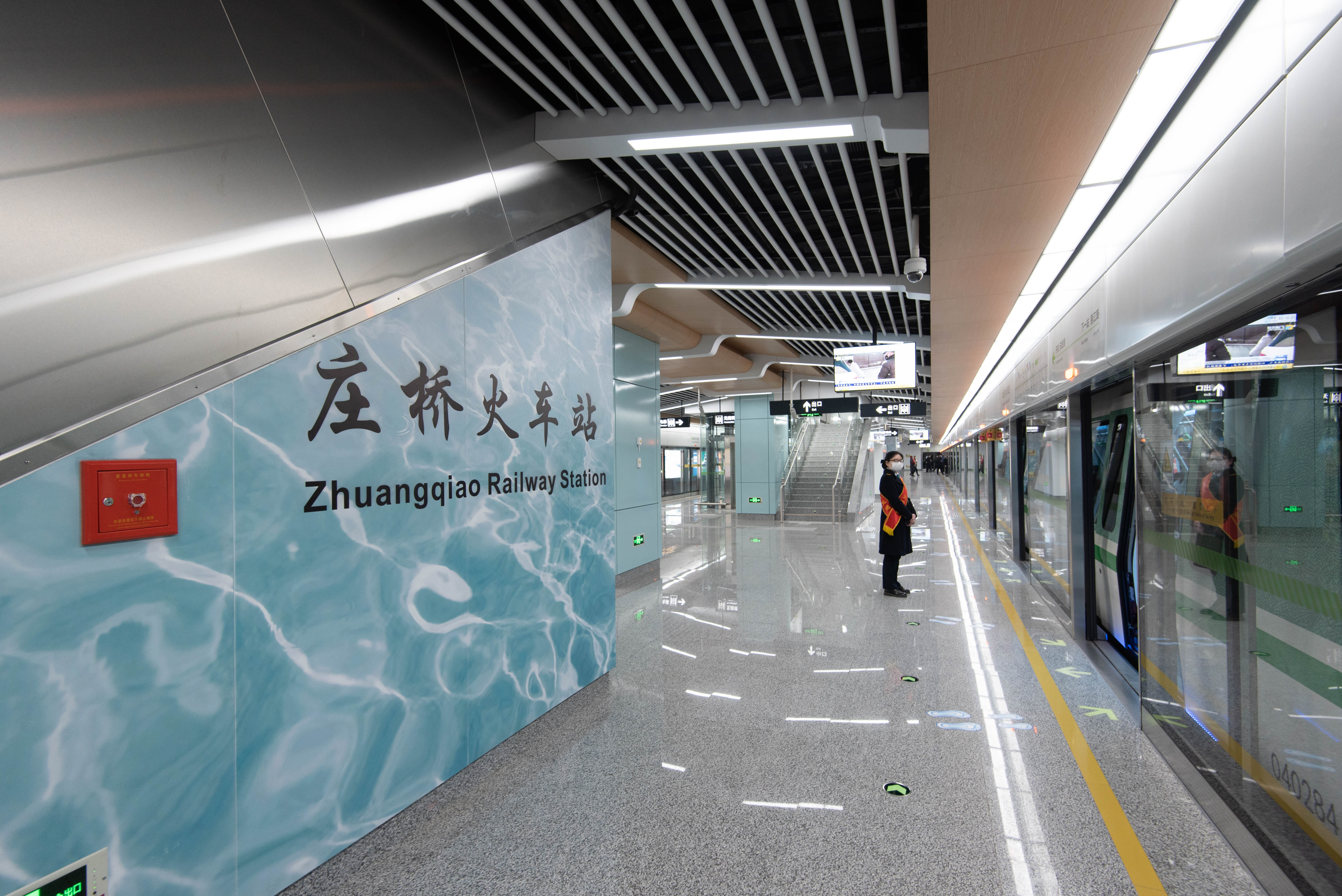
The metro station on Line 4 of Ningbo Rail Transit.

Preceding station	China Railway High-speed	Following station
Yuyao North towards Hangzhou East	Hangzhou–Ningbo high-speed railway	Ningbo Terminus
Preceding station	China Railway	Following station
Ningbo North towards Hangzhou South	Xiaoshan–Ningbo railway	Ningbo Terminus
