= Shaoxing East railway station =

Railway station in Shaoxing, China

Coordinates: 30°03′32″N 120°50′31″E

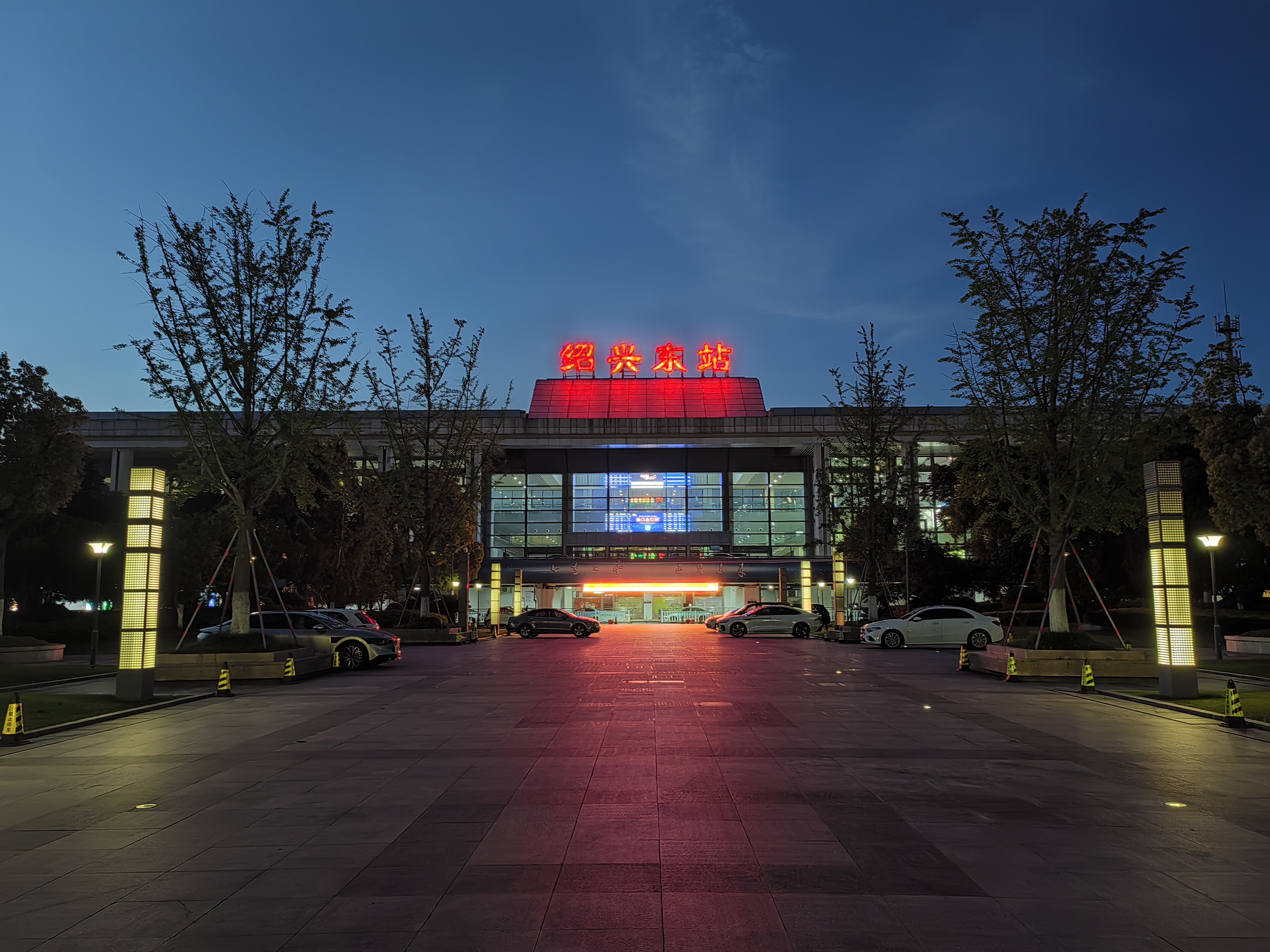
Shaoxing East railway station

Shaoxingdong (Shaoxing East) railway station (simplified Chinese: 绍兴东站; traditional Chinese: 紹興東站; pinyin: Shàoxīng Dōngzhàn), is a railway station on the Hangzhou–Ningbo high-speed railway located in Shangyu District, Shaoxing, Zhejiang, China.

== History ==
The station was named Shangyu North railway station (simplified Chinese: 上虞北站; traditional Chinese: 上虞北站; pinyin: Shàngyú Běizhàn) when it opened on 1 July 2013. On 1 December 2016, the station was renamed to Shaoxing East railway station.

== See also ==
- Shaoxing North railway station
- Shaoxing railway station

Preceding station	China Railway High-speed	Following station
Shaoxing North towards Hangzhou East	Hangzhou–Ningbo high-speed railway	Yuyao North towards Ningbo
