= Yuyao North railway station =

Railway station in Yuyao, China

Coordinates: 30°06′03″N 121°09′52″E

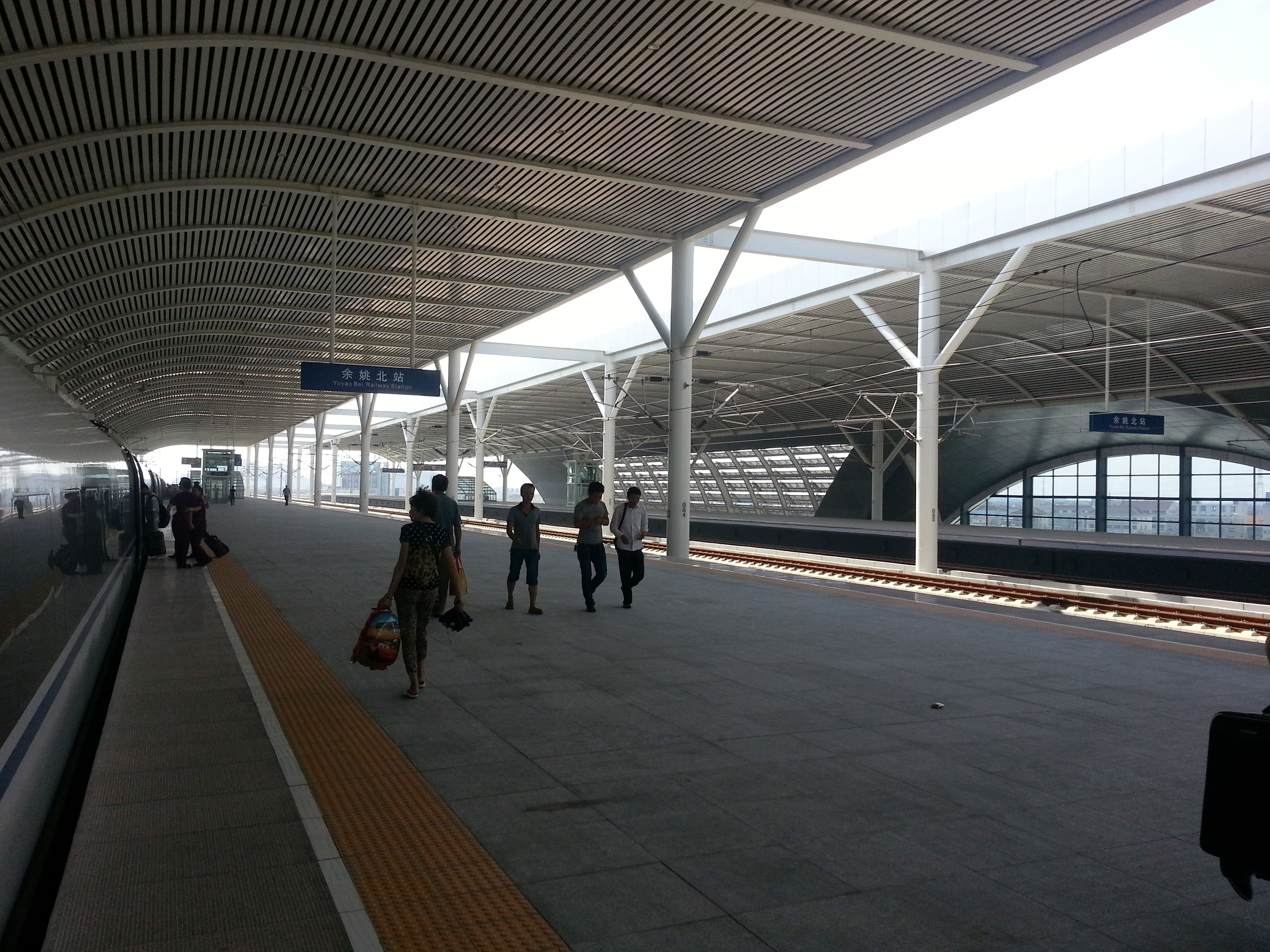
Yuyao North Station Platform

Yuyaobei (Yuyao North) railway station (simplified Chinese: 余姚北站; traditional Chinese: 餘姚北站; pinyin: Yúyáo Běizhàn) is a railway station on the Hangzhou–Ningbo high-speed railway located in Zhejiang, China. This is the major railway station in Yuyao with high-speed service, the other being Yuyao railway station.

Preceding station	China Railway High-speed	Following station
Shaoxing East towards Hangzhou East	Hangzhou–Ningbo high-speed railway	Zhuangqiao towards Ningbo
