= Shaoxing North railway station =

Railway station in Shaoxing, Zhejiang

Shaoxingbei 绍兴北
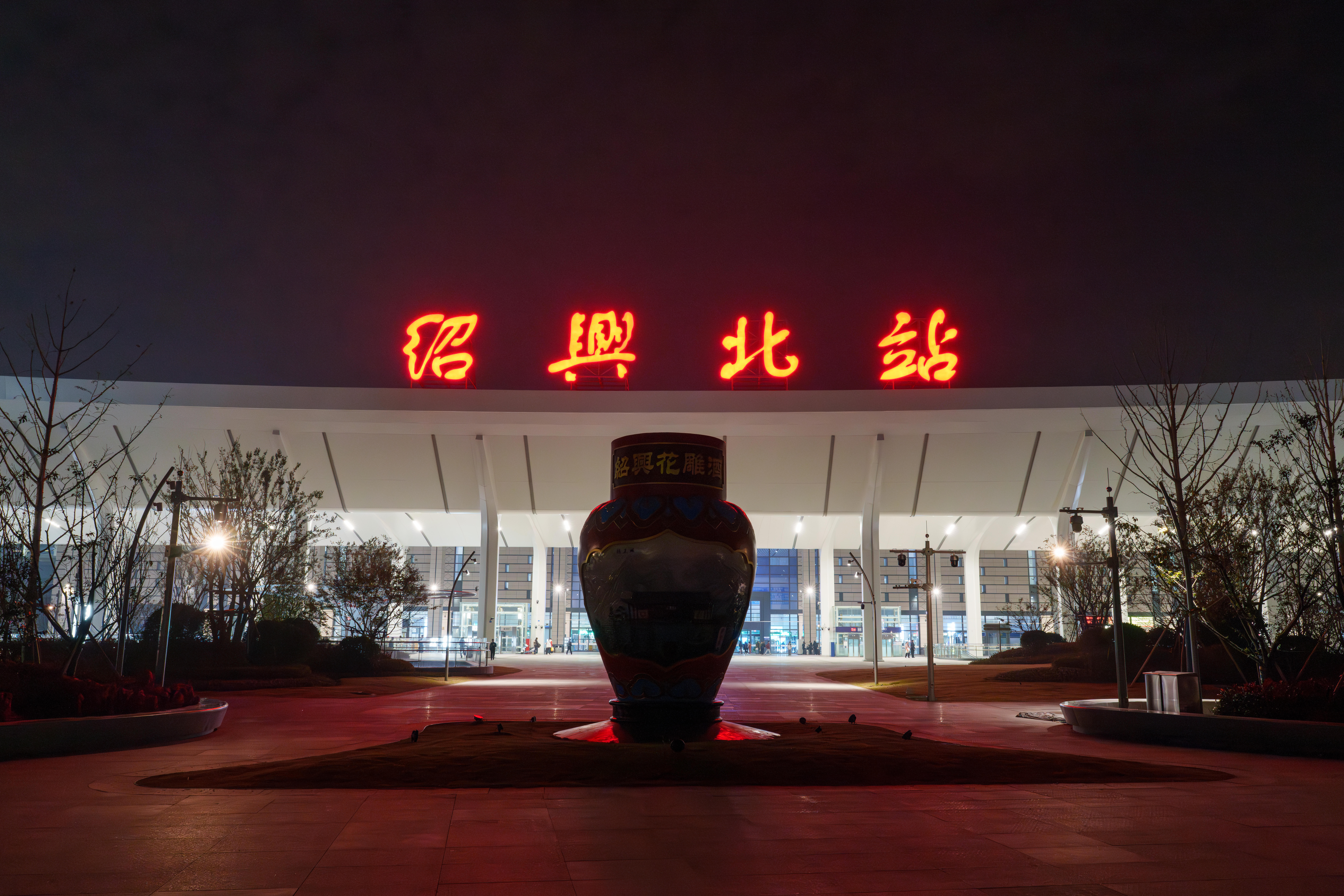
- Station building after renovation (November 2025)

General information
- Location: Yuecheng District, Shaoxing, Zhenjiang; China
- Coordinates: 30°06′08″N 120°32′04″E
- Lines: Hangzhou–Ningbo high-speed railway; Hangzhou–Taizhou high-speed railway

History
- Opened: 1 July 2013
Location

Shaoxingbei (Shaoxing North) railway station (simplified Chinese: 绍兴北站; traditional Chinese: 紹興北站; pinyin: Shàoxīng Běizhàn) is a railway station on the Hangzhou–Ningbo high-speed railway located in Yuecheng District, Shaoxing, Zhejiang, China. The station is served by Line 1 of the Shaoxing Metro.

== History ==
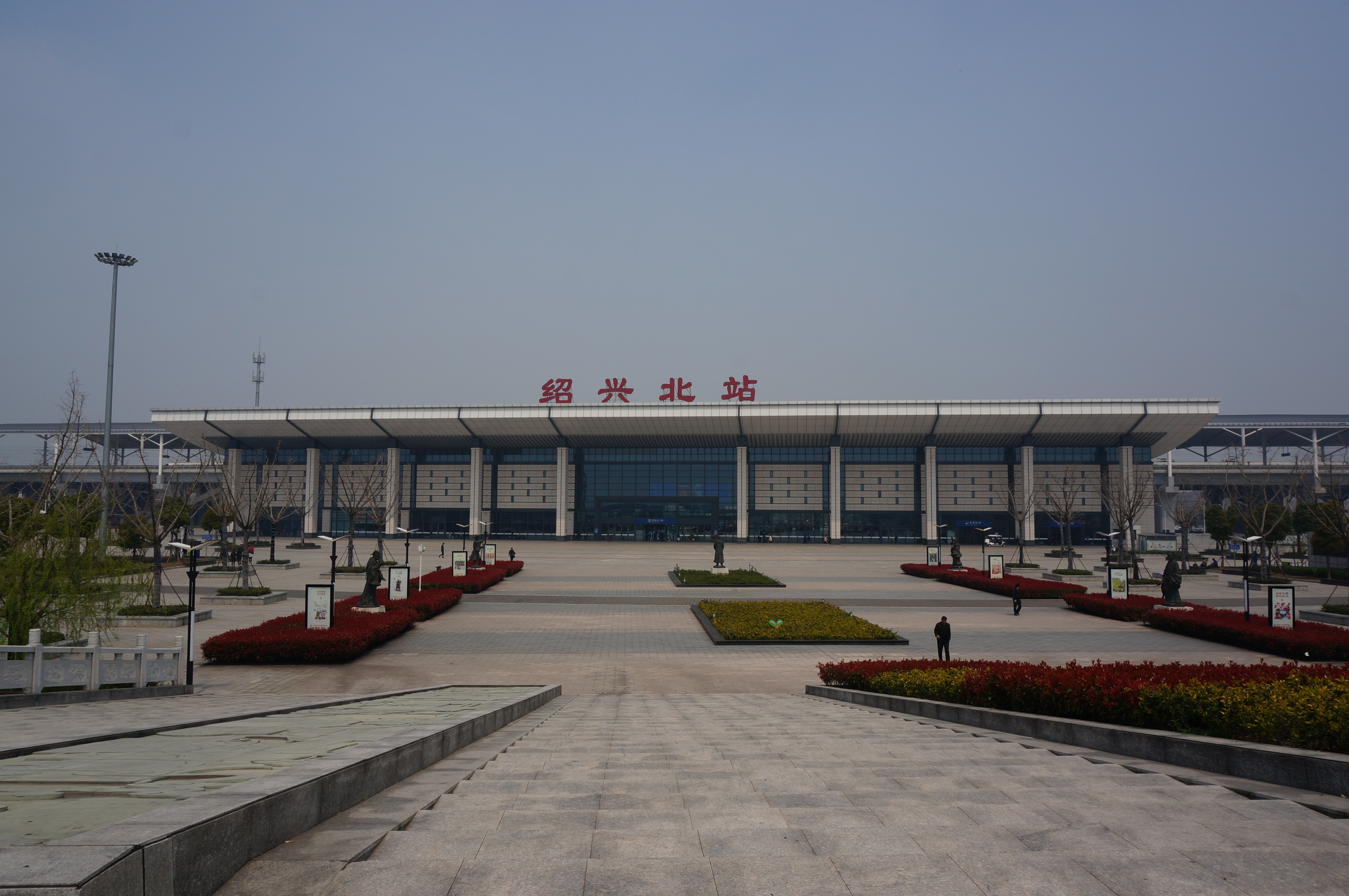
Station building before renovation (March 2015)

During construction, the station was sometimes called Shaoxing Keqiao railway station. The name Shaoxing North was confirmed in August 2012. The station was opened on 1 July 2013.

With the construction of the Hangzhou–Taizhou high-speed railway the station was expanded from the original four platforms to eight platforms. A new north-facing station building was also built. The line opened on 8 January 2022.

== See also ==
- Shaoxing East railway station
- Shaoxing railway station

Preceding station	China Railway High-speed	Following station
Hangzhou South towards Hangzhou East	Hangzhou–Ningbo high-speed railway	Shaoxing East towards Ningbo
Hangzhou South towards Hangzhou East	Hangzhou–Taizhou high-speed railway	Shangyu South towards Yuhuan
