= Jiuhe =

Jiuhe may refer to:

- Jiuhe Township, Jiangxi (Chinese: 九合), a township in Jiangxi Province, China
- Jiuhe Township, Zhejiang (Chinese: 九和), a township in Zhejiang Province, China
- Jiuhe Road Station (Chinese: 九和), a station of the Hangzhou Metro, China
- Jiuhe (Chinese: 九河), Chinese name of the star Mu Herculis
