= Pengbu =

Pengbu may refer to:

- Pengbu Town, Jianggan District, Hangzhou, China
- Pengbu station, on the Hangzhou Metro, China
