= Hangzhou South railway station =

Metro station in China

Hangzhounan 杭州南
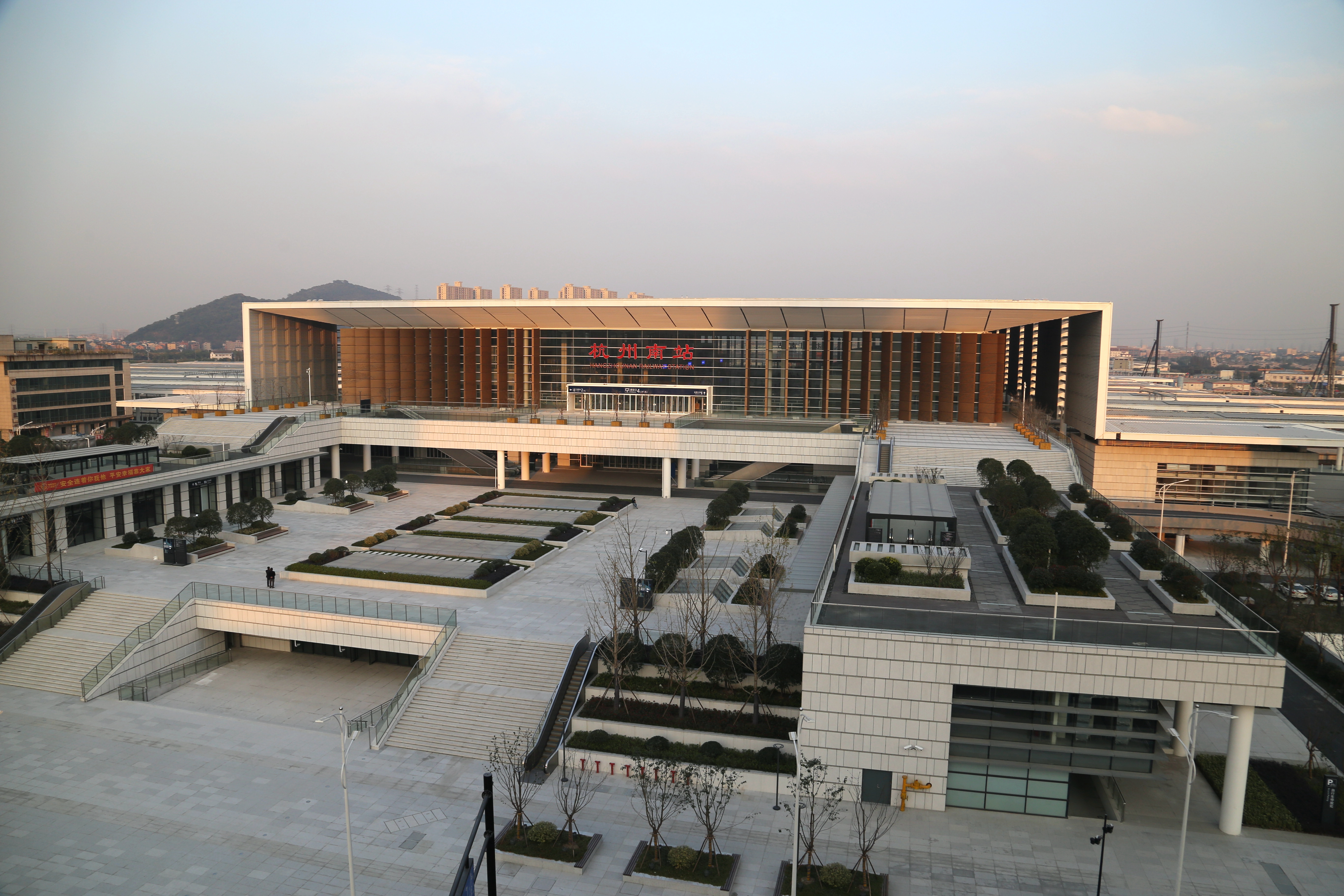
- Hangzhou South railway station after renovation work.

General information
- Other names: Hangzhou South
- Location: Xiaoshan District, Hangzhou, Zhejiang; China
- Coordinates: 30°10′28″N 120°17′24″E
- Operator: China Railway Shanghai Group, China Railway Corporation
- Lines: Shanghai–Kunming Railway; Xiaoshan–Ningbo Railway; Hangzhou–Ningbo High-Speed Railway; Shanghai–Kunming High-Speed Railway; Hangzhou–Huangshan Intercity Railway; Hangzhou–Taizhou high-speed railway
- Platforms: 4

Construction
- Architect: Gerkan, Marg and Partners

Other information
- Station code: TMIS code: 32460; Telegraph code: XHH; Pinyin code: HZN
- Classification: 1st class station

History
- Opened: June 11, 1992
- Former names: Xiaoshan
Location

Hangzhounan (Hangzhou South) railway station (Chinese: 杭州南站; pinyin: Hángzhōunán zhàn) is a railway station located in the Xiaoshan District, Hangzhou, Zhejiang Province, China.

== History ==
Xiaoshan railway station (simplified Chinese: 萧山站; traditional Chinese: 蕭山站; pinyin: Xiāoshān zhàn) opened in 1992. Xiaoshan station was renamed Hangzhou South station on January 1, 2010. The station closed for renovation work on July 1, 2013, when Hangzhou East railway station opened. The metro station on the newly built Metro Line 5, which connects the railway station with Xiaoshan District, downtown, northern and western Hangzhou, opened on June 30, 2020. The rebuilt railway station reopened on July 1, 2020.

== Gallery ==
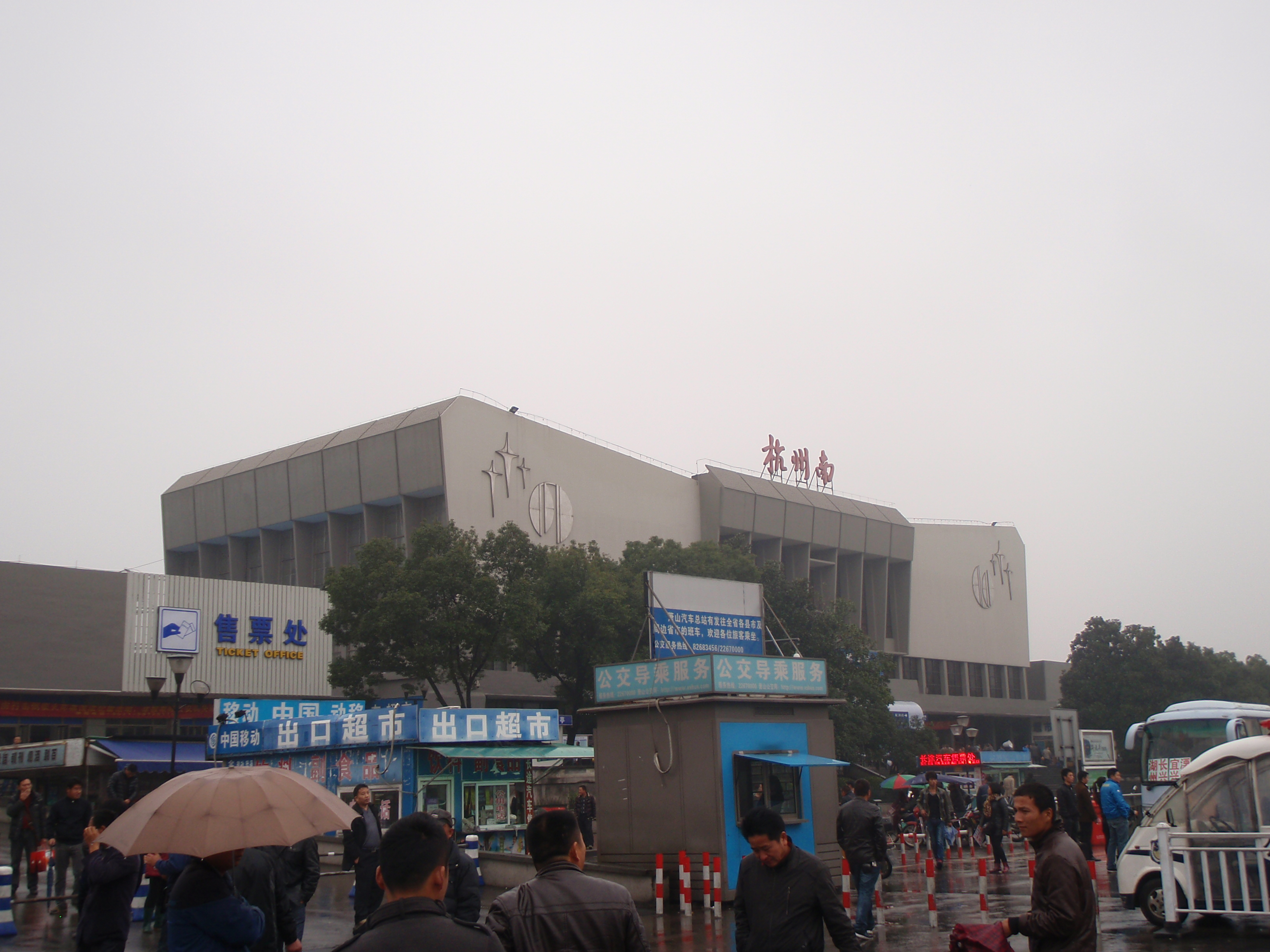
Hangzhou South railway station prior to renovation

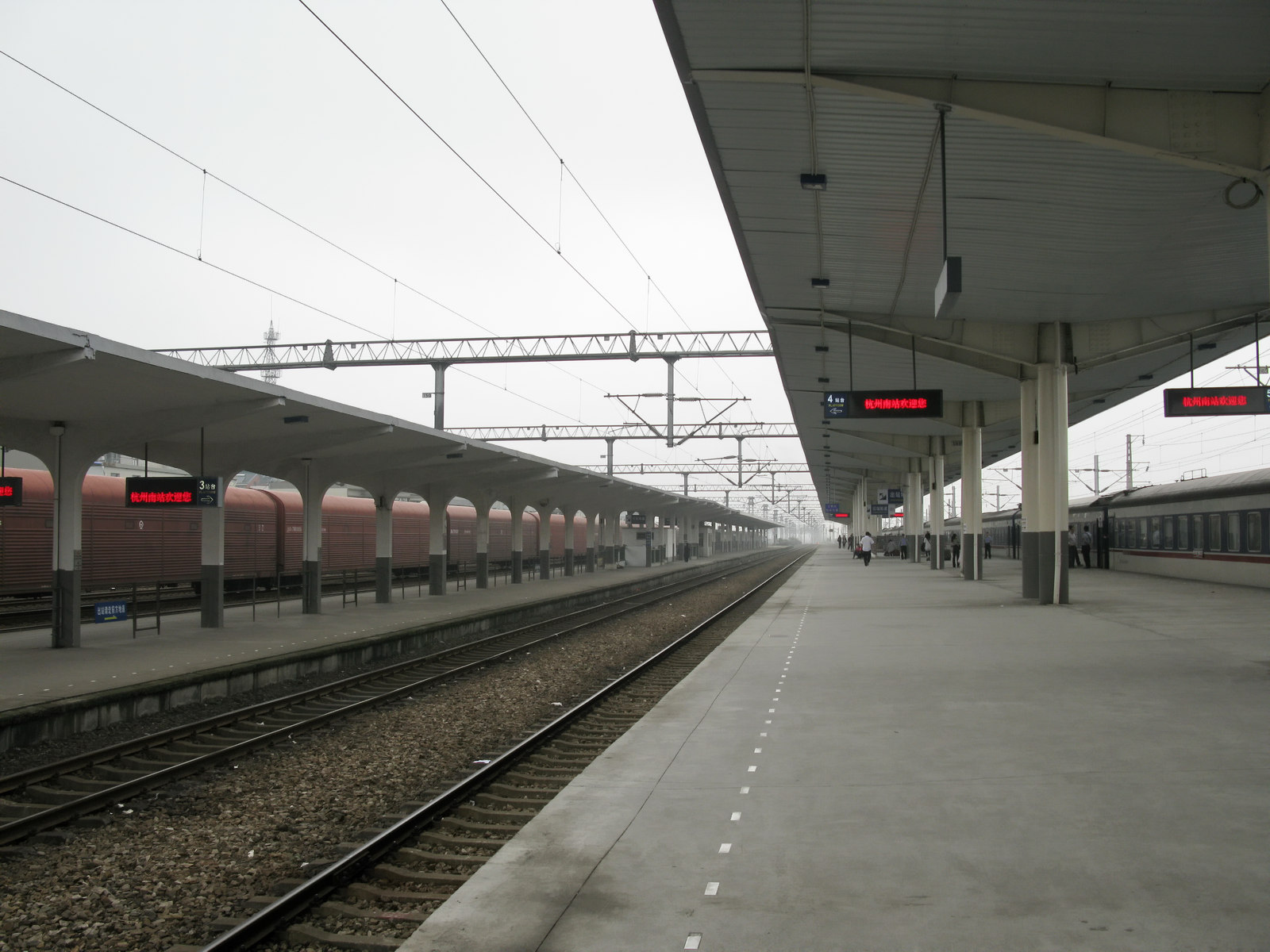
Platform at Hangzhou South railway station

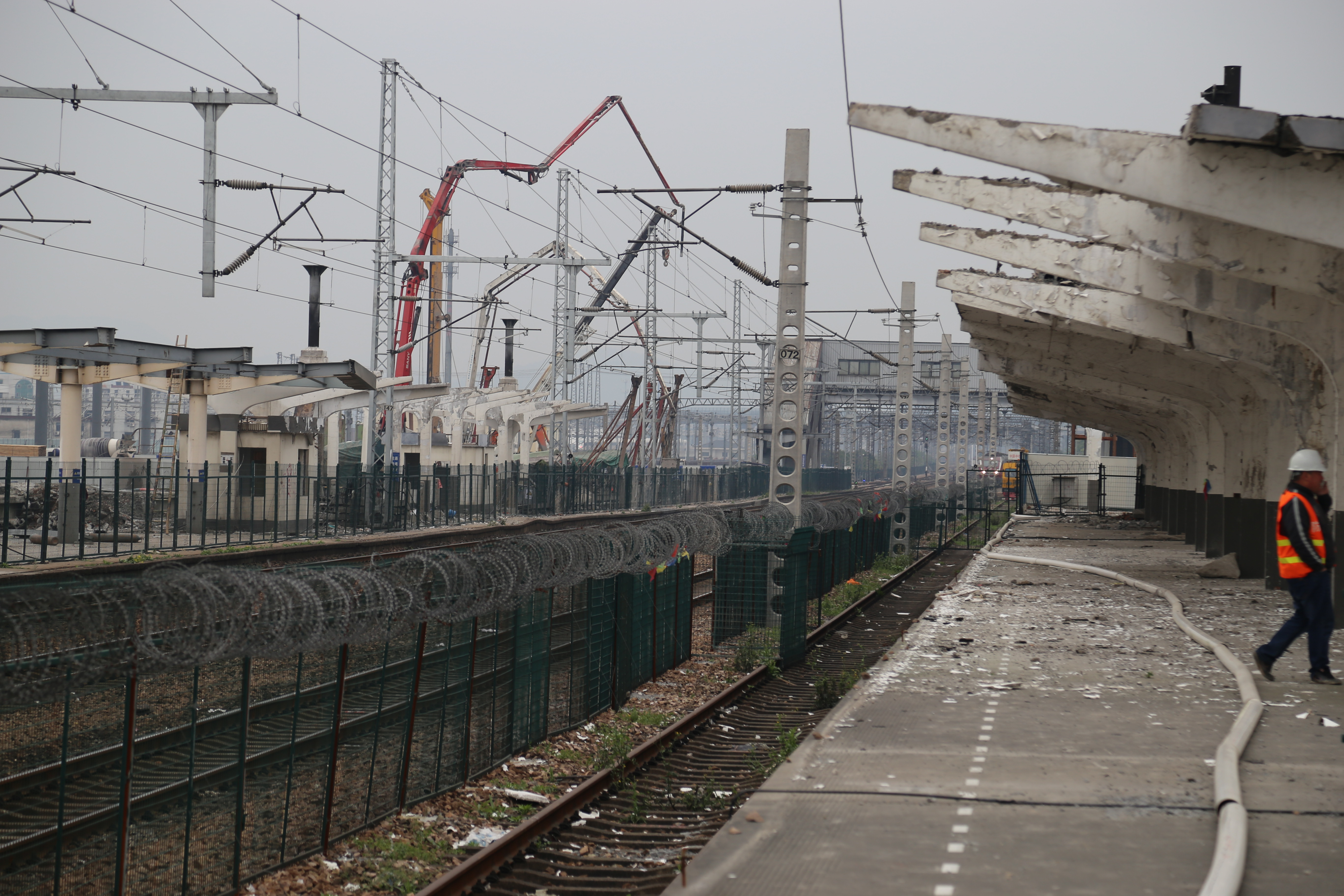
Hangzhou South railway station under renovation works

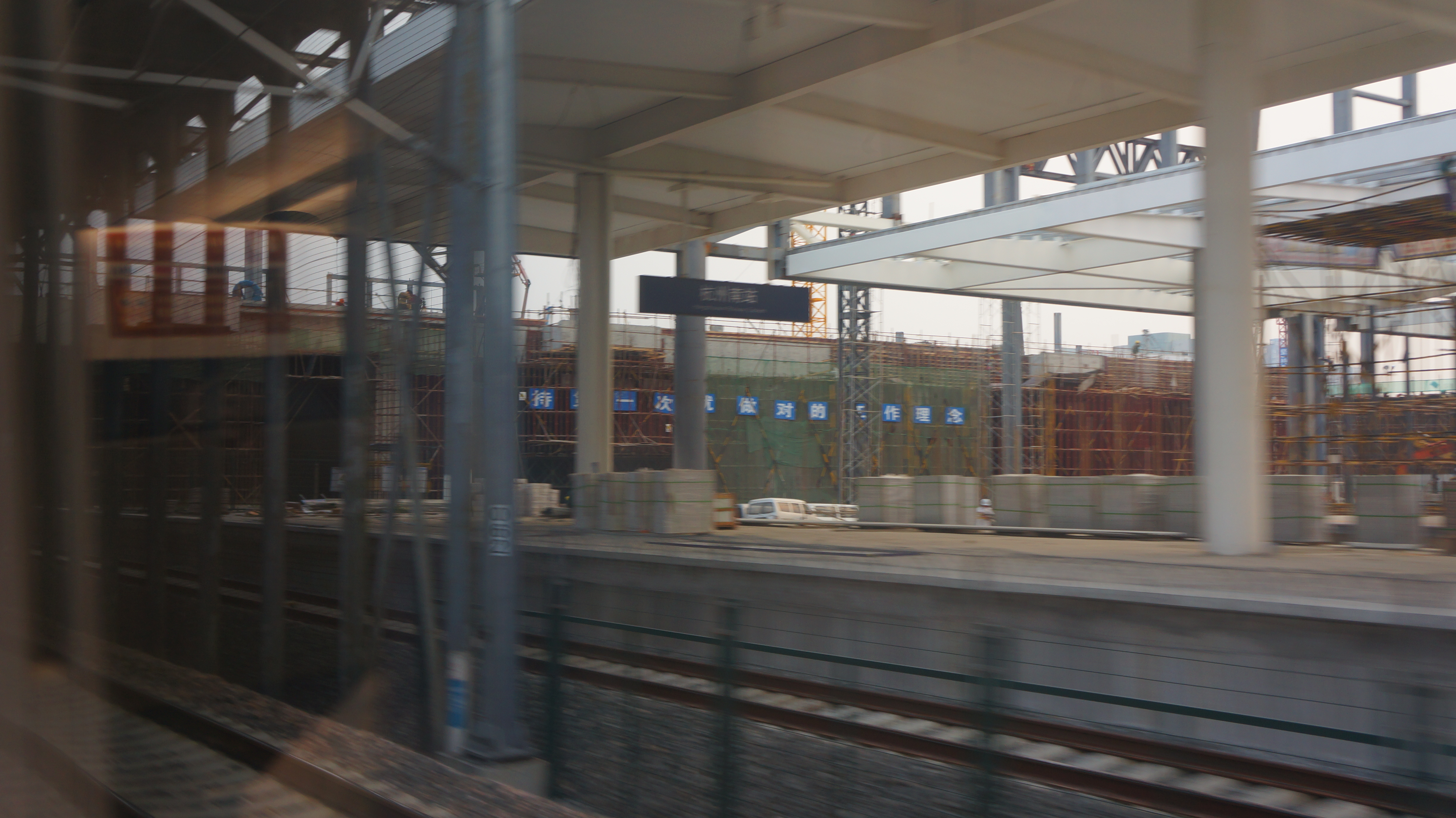
Hangzhoun South railway station under renovation

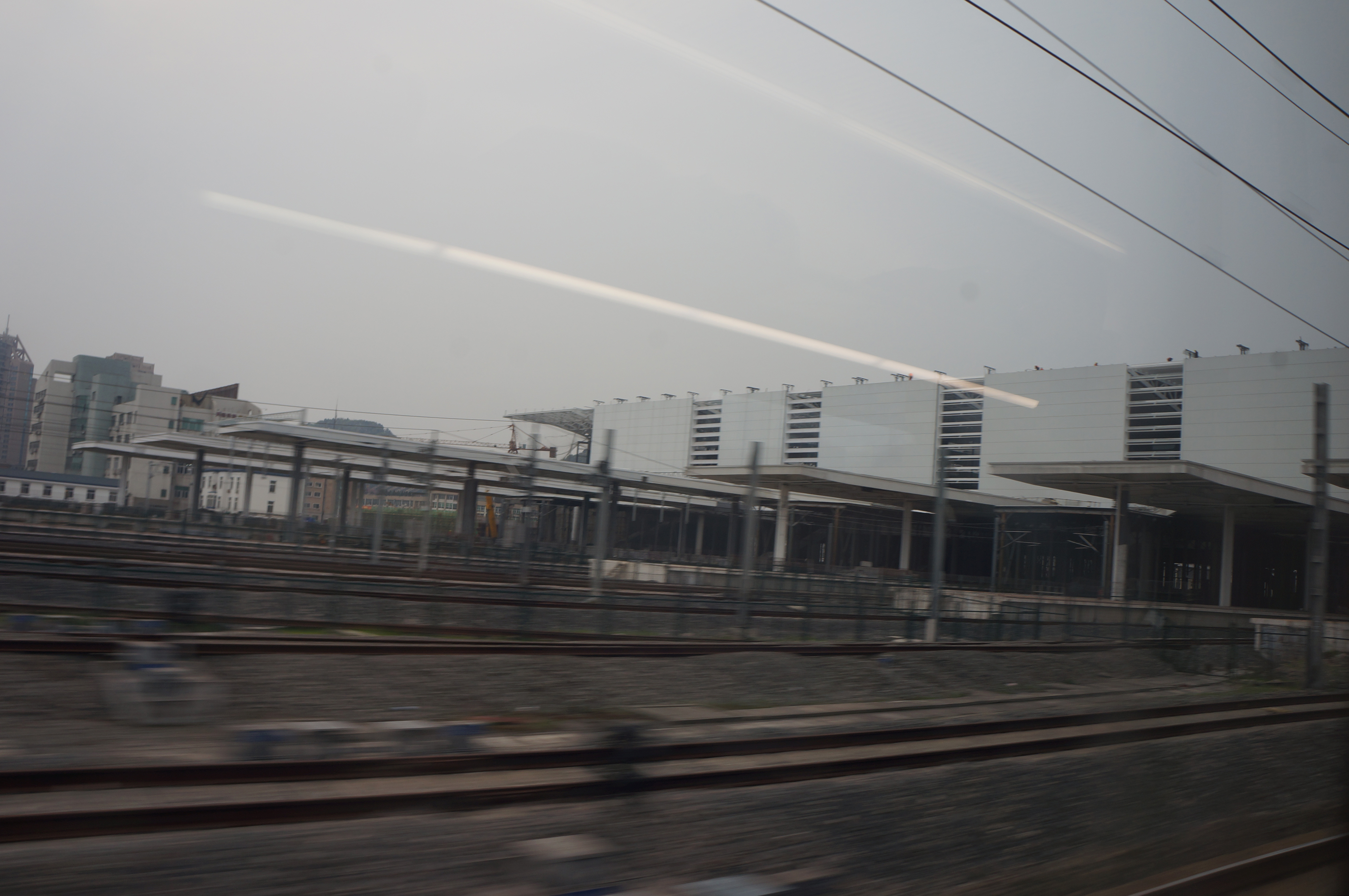
Hangzhou South railway station after renovation works

== Hangzhou Metro ==
South Railway Station 火车南站
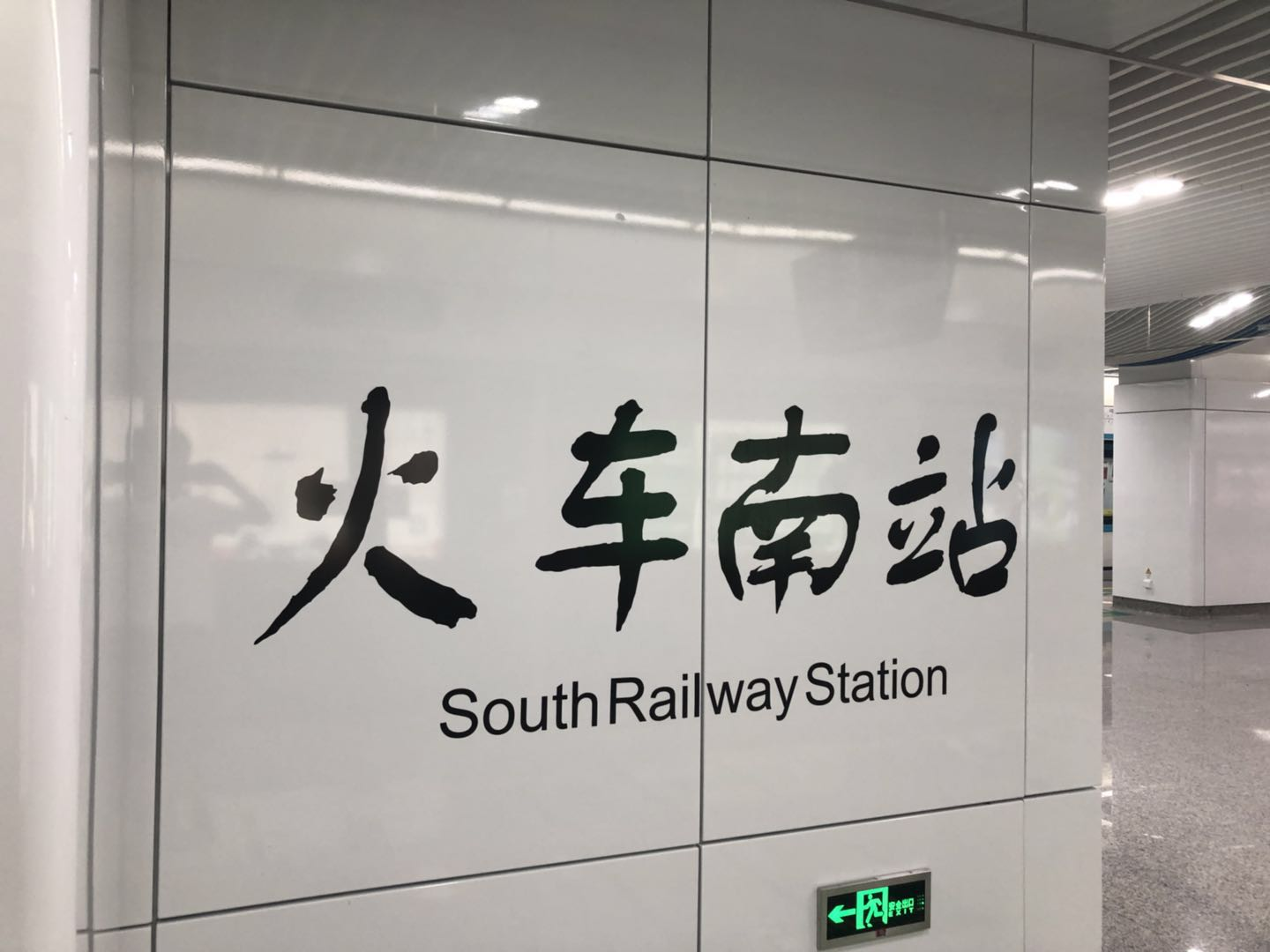

General information
- Location: East square, Hangzhou South railway station Xiaoshan District, Hangzhou, Zhejiang; China
- System: Hangzhou metro station
- Operator: Hangzhou MTR Line 5 Corporation
- Line: Line 5
- Platforms: 2 (1 island platform)

Construction
- Structure type: Underground
- Accessible: Yes

History
- Opened: June 30, 2020

Services
Preceding station	Hangzhou Metro	Following station
Middle Tonghui Road towards East Nanhu	Line 5	Shuangqiao towards Guniangqiao
Location

South Railway Station (simplified Chinese: 火车南站; traditional Chinese: 火車南站) is a metro station on Line 5 of the Hangzhou Metro in China. It is located in the Xiaoshan District of Hangzhou and it serves Hangzhou South railway station.

=== Station layout ===
South Railway Station has three levels: basement 1 is a concourse, basement 3 is an island platform with two tracks for line 5. It was initially planned as an interchange station of lines 5 and 11, so basement 2 is designed as the platforms level of line 11. Now line 17 replaces the position, but it is still in planning stage.

The concourse is located at the arrival area of railway station, so the metro station has not separated entrances.

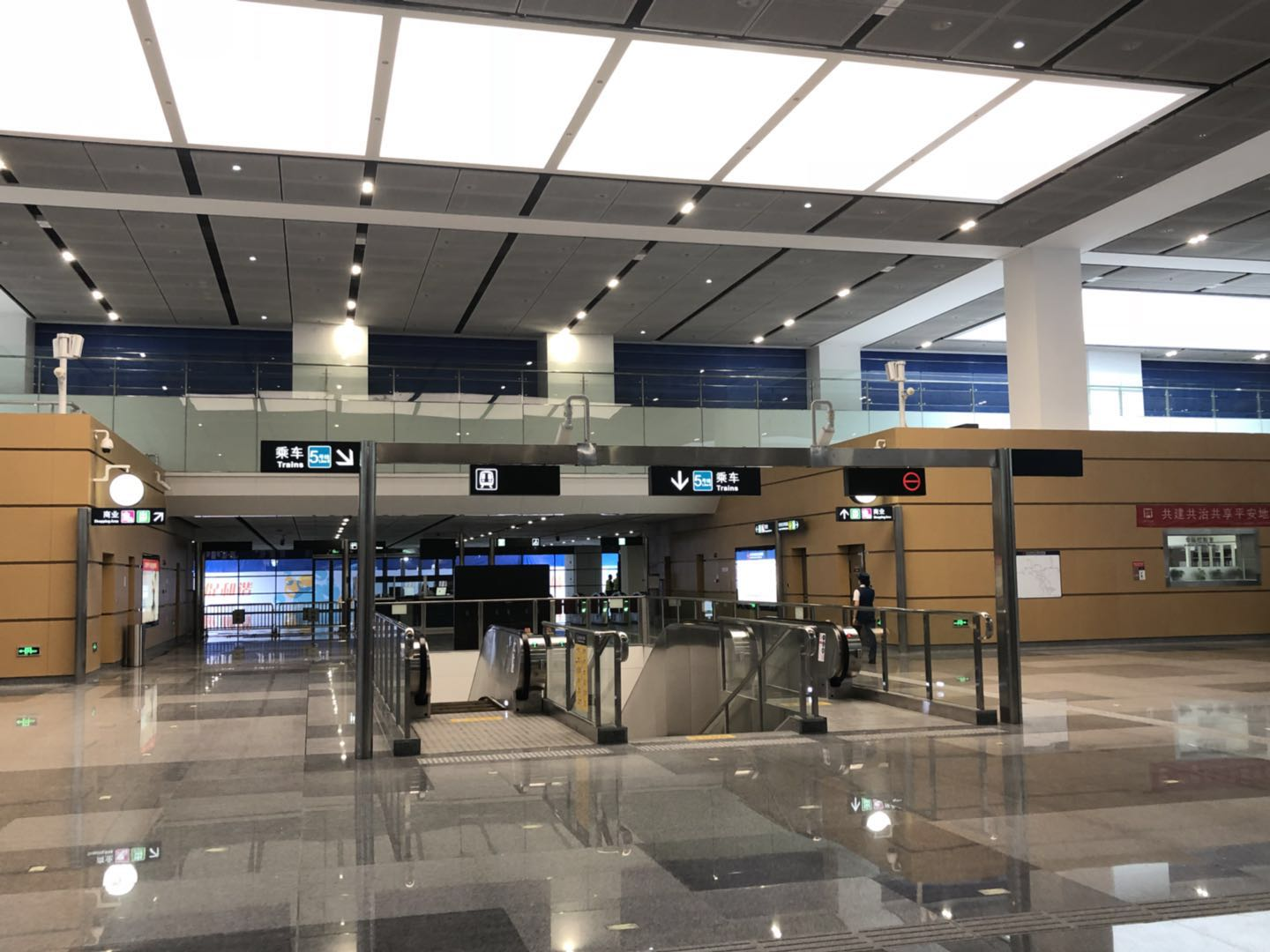
Concourse

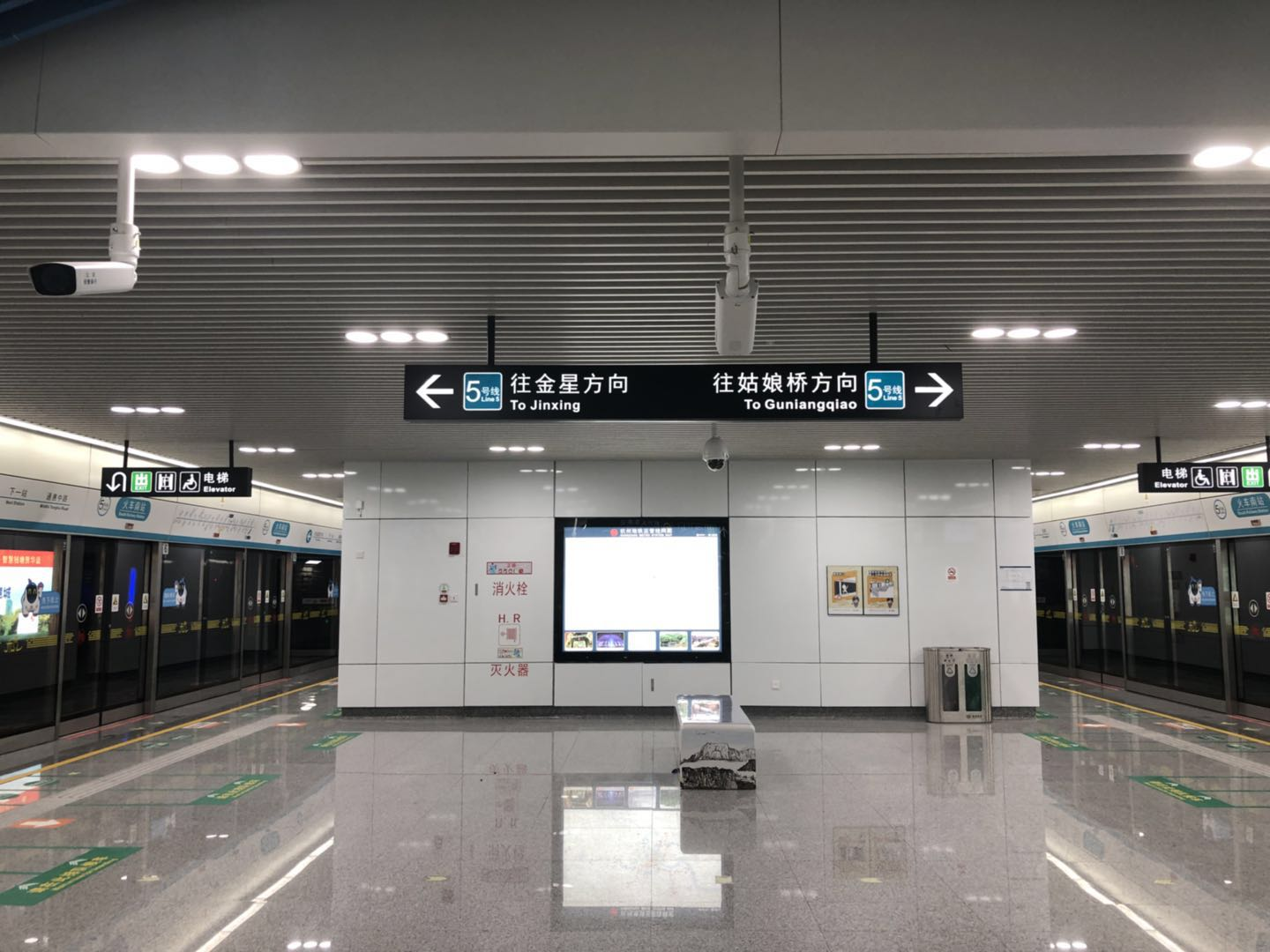
Platform

== See also ==
- Hangzhou railway station
- Hangzhou East railway station
- Hangzhou Metro

Preceding station	China Railway High-speed	Following station
Hangzhou East Terminus	Hangzhou–Ningbo high-speed railway	Shaoxing North towards Ningbo
Hangzhou East towards Shanghai Hongqiao	Shanghai–Kunming high-speed railway	Zhuji towards Kunming South
Hangzhou East Terminus	Hangzhou–Taizhou high-speed railway	Shaoxing North towards Yuhuan
Terminus	Hangzhou–Huangshan intercity railway	Fuyang towards Huangshan North
Preceding station	China Railway	Following station
Yingning towards Shanghai or Shanghai South	Shanghai–Kunming railway	Xiaoshan towards Kunming
Xiaoshan West Terminus	Xiaoshan–Ningbo railway	Xiajiaqiao towards Ningbo
