= Xiaoshan–Ningbo railway =

Railway line in China

Xiaoshan–Ningbo railway 萧甬铁路
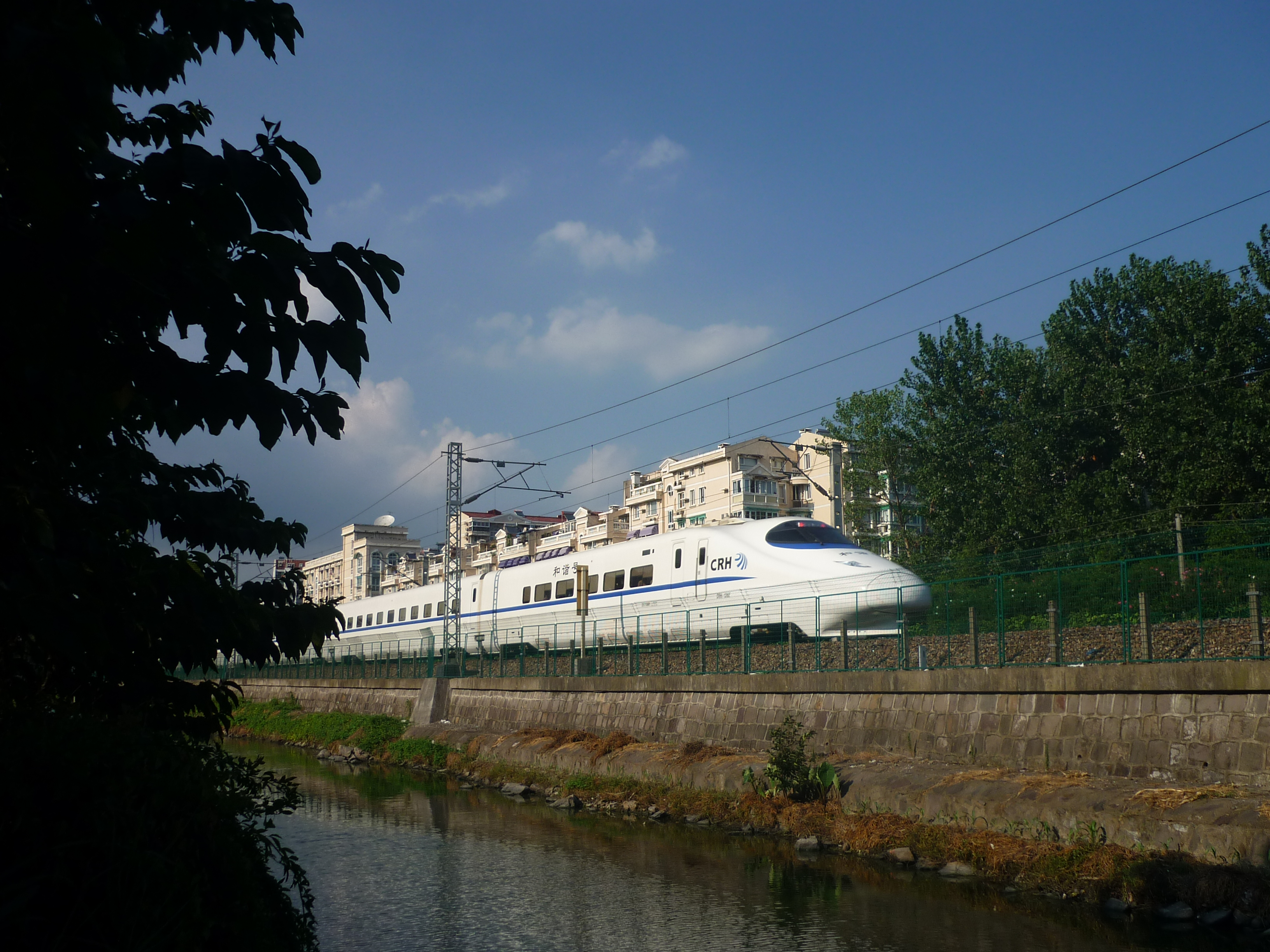
- CRH2 trainset on Xiaoyong railway

Overview
- Status: Operational
- Termini: Hangzhou South; Ningbo
- Stations: 23 (14 active)

Service
- Type: Heavy rail
- Operator: China Railway

Technical
- Line length: 147.32 km (91.54 mi)
- Track gauge: 1,435 mm (4 ft 8 1/2 in) standard gauge

The Xiaoshan–Ningbo railway or Xiaoyong railway (simplified Chinese: 萧甬铁路; traditional Chinese: 蕭甬鐵路; pinyin: Xiāoyǒng tiělù), is a double-track railroad in eastern China between Hangzhou and Ningbo in Zhejiang Province. Its name in Chinese, the Xiaoyong Line, is named after the railway's two terminal stations, Hangzhou South in Xiaoshan District of Hangzhou on the southern bank of Qiantang River, and Ningbo, whose Chinese character abbreviation is yong. The line is 147.3 km (92 mi) long and was originally built in three parts in 1912, 1914 and 1936; rebuilt in 1959, then electrified in 2009. Cities along route include Xiaoshan District of Hangzhou, Shaoxing, Shangyu, Yuyao and Ningbo, all in Zhejiang Province. The Hangzhou–Ningbo high-speed railway runs parallel to the line. The section between Ningbo and Zhuangqiao railway station is proposed to be quadruple-tracked.

== Line history ==
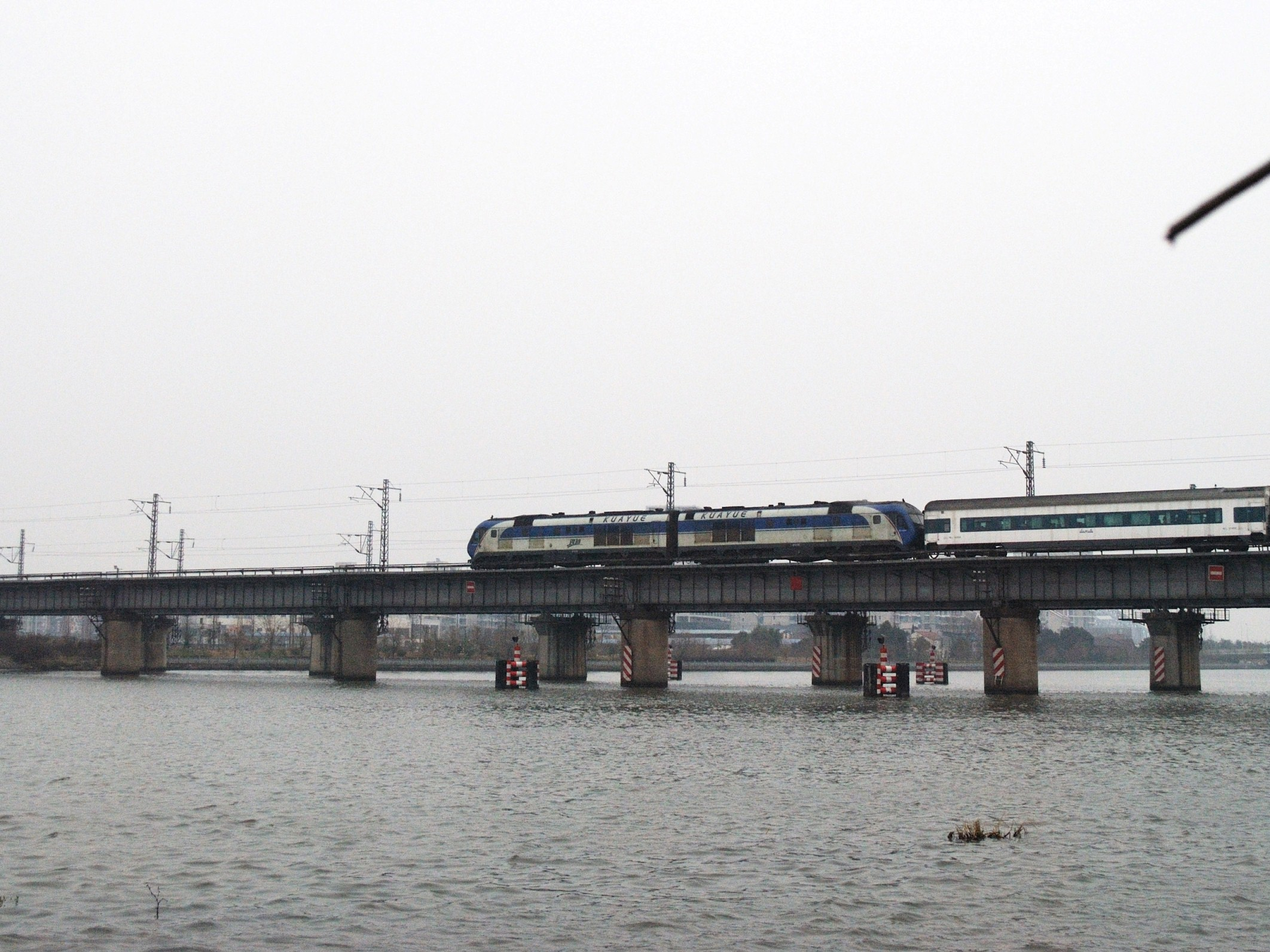
The Qinglindu Bridge of the Xiaoyong railway in Ningbo

The oldest section on the Xiaoyong railway is the 18.19 kilometres (11.30 mi) section between Ningbo and Cicheng, which opened in December 1912. The Ningbo to Cao'e section, 78 kilometres (48 mi) in length, followed in June 1914, and the Xiaoshan to Cao'e section was completed in October 1936. During the Second Sino-Japanese War in 1938, the railway line was dismantled to prevent its use by the invading Japanese. Following the end of World War II, the railroad right of way was converted into a highway. In 1953, the railway was rebuilt in parts and completed in 1959 with the assistance of Soviet engineers. Between 2002 and 2009, the line was electrified. In 2013, the parallel Hangzhou–Ningbo high-speed railway opens, shifting significant amounts of intercity passenger traffic away from the Xiaoyong Railway and enabling railway to carry more freight and local passenger traffic. Since 2017, a number a commuter railway services started operating on segments of the line, such as Line S1 Ningbo–Yuyao intercity railway operating in Ningbo and Shaoxing Tourism New Transit railway operating in Shaoxing. In 2018, China's first double-stack container trains running under overhead catenary started operation on Xiaoyong railway between Gaobu and the Port of Ningbo-Zhoushan.

== Rail junctions ==
- Hangzhou: Shanghai–Kunming railway, Xuancheng–Hangzhou railway
- Ningbo: Ningbo–Taizhou–Wenzhou railway

== See also ==
- List of railways in China
