= Jiubao station =

Hangzhou Metro station

Coordinates: 30°18′36″N 120°15′43″E

Jiubao 九堡
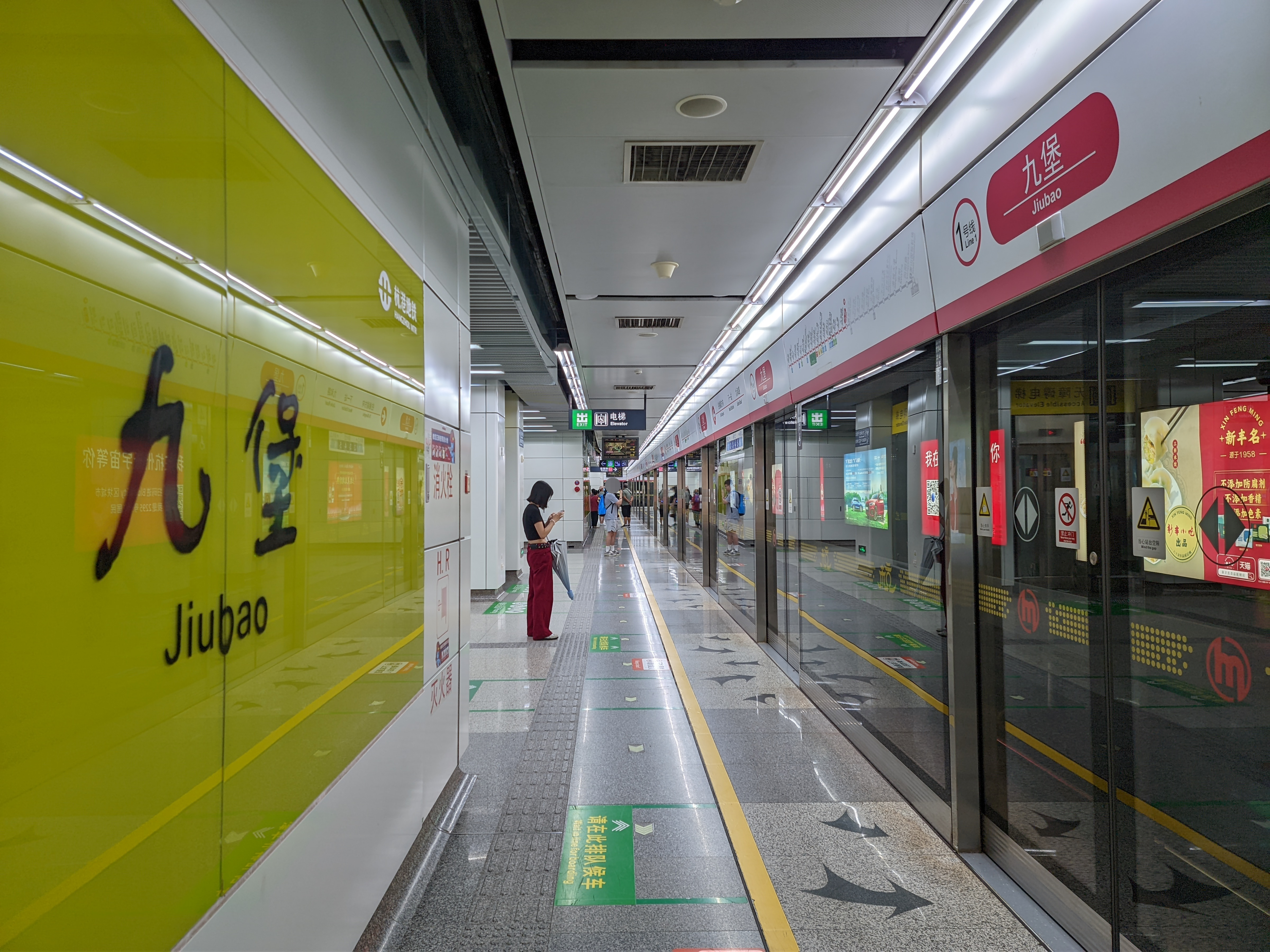
- Platform

General information
- Location: Shangcheng District, Hangzhou, Zhejiang; China
- Operated by: Hangzhou Metro Corporation
- Line: Line 1
- Platforms: 2 (1 island platform)

Services
Preceding station	Hangzhou Metro	Following station
Jiuhe Road towards Xianghu	Line 1	Coach Center towards Xiaoshan International Airport
Location

Jiubao (Chinese: 九堡) is a station on Line 1 of the Hangzhou Metro in China. It was opened in November 2012, together with the rest of the stations on Line 1. It is located in the Shangcheng District of Hangzhou.
