= Qibao station (Hangzhou Metro) =

Hangzhou Metro station

Qibao 七堡
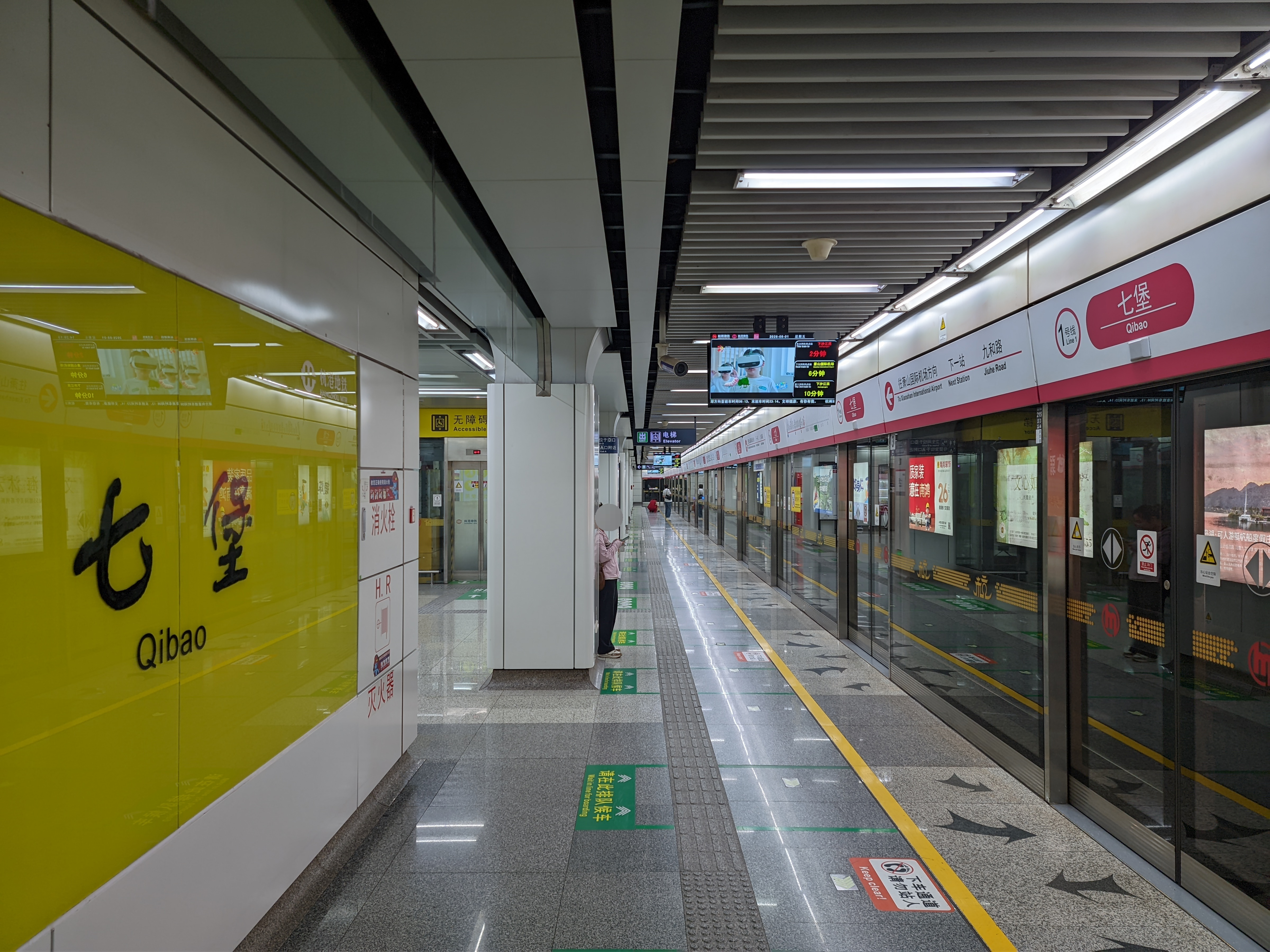
- Platform

General information
- Location: Tie Hui Development Center; Shangcheng, Hangzhou, Zhejiang; China
- Coordinates: 30°18′08″N 120°14′10″E
- System: Hangzhou metro station
- Operator: Hangzhou MTR Corporation
- Line: Line 1
- Platforms: 2 (1 island platform)

Construction
- Structure type: Underground
- Accessible: Yes

History
- Opened: 24 November 2012

Services
Preceding station	Hangzhou Metro	Following station
Pengbu towards Xianghu	Line 1	Jiuhe Road towards Xiaoshan International Airport
Location

Qibao (Chinese: 七堡) is a station on Line 1 of the Hangzhou Metro in China. It was opened in November 2012, together with the rest of the stations on Line 1. It is located in the Shangcheng District of Hangzhou.

== Station layout ==
Qibao has two levels: a concourse, and an island platform with two tracks for line 1.

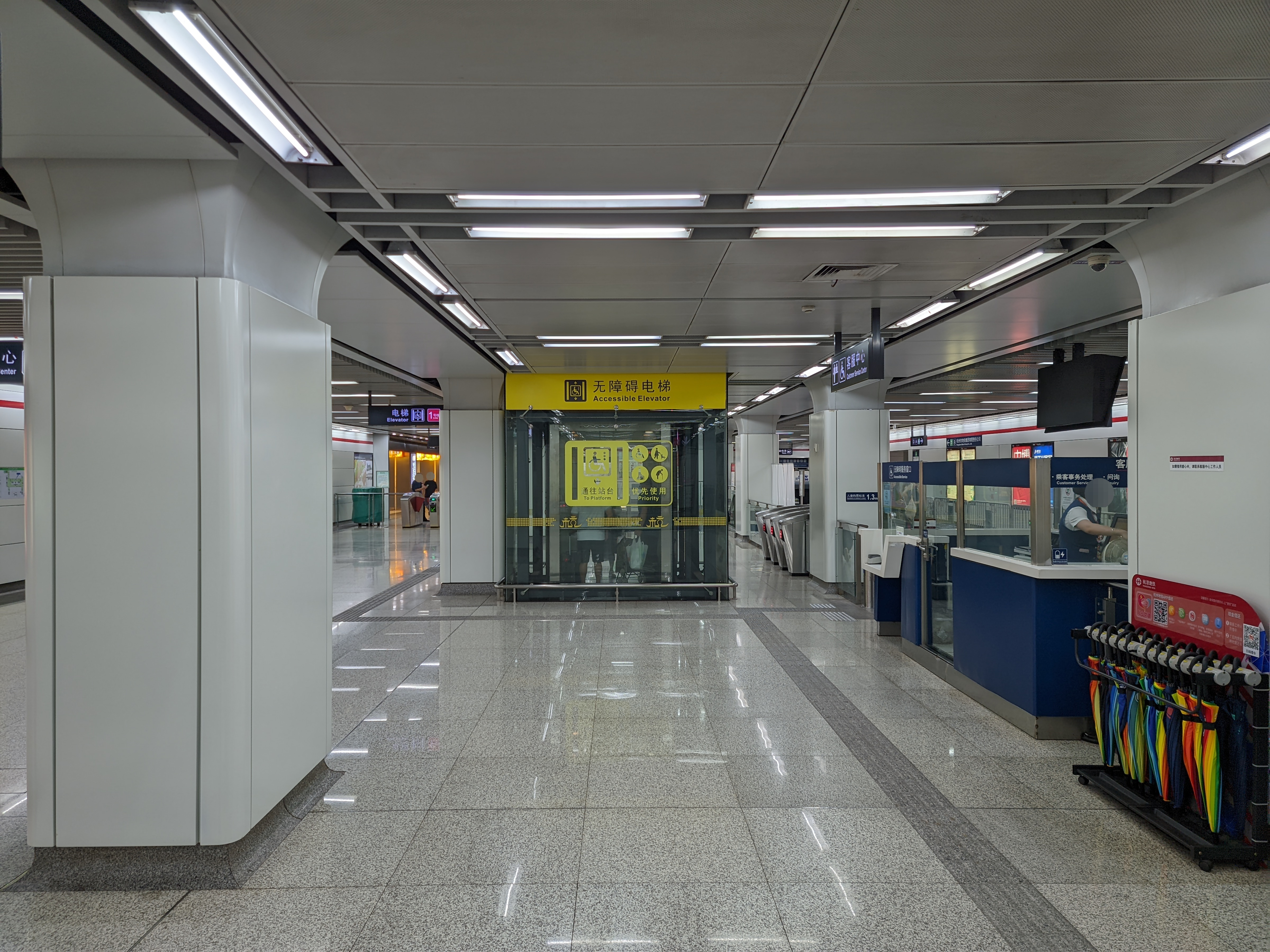
Concourse

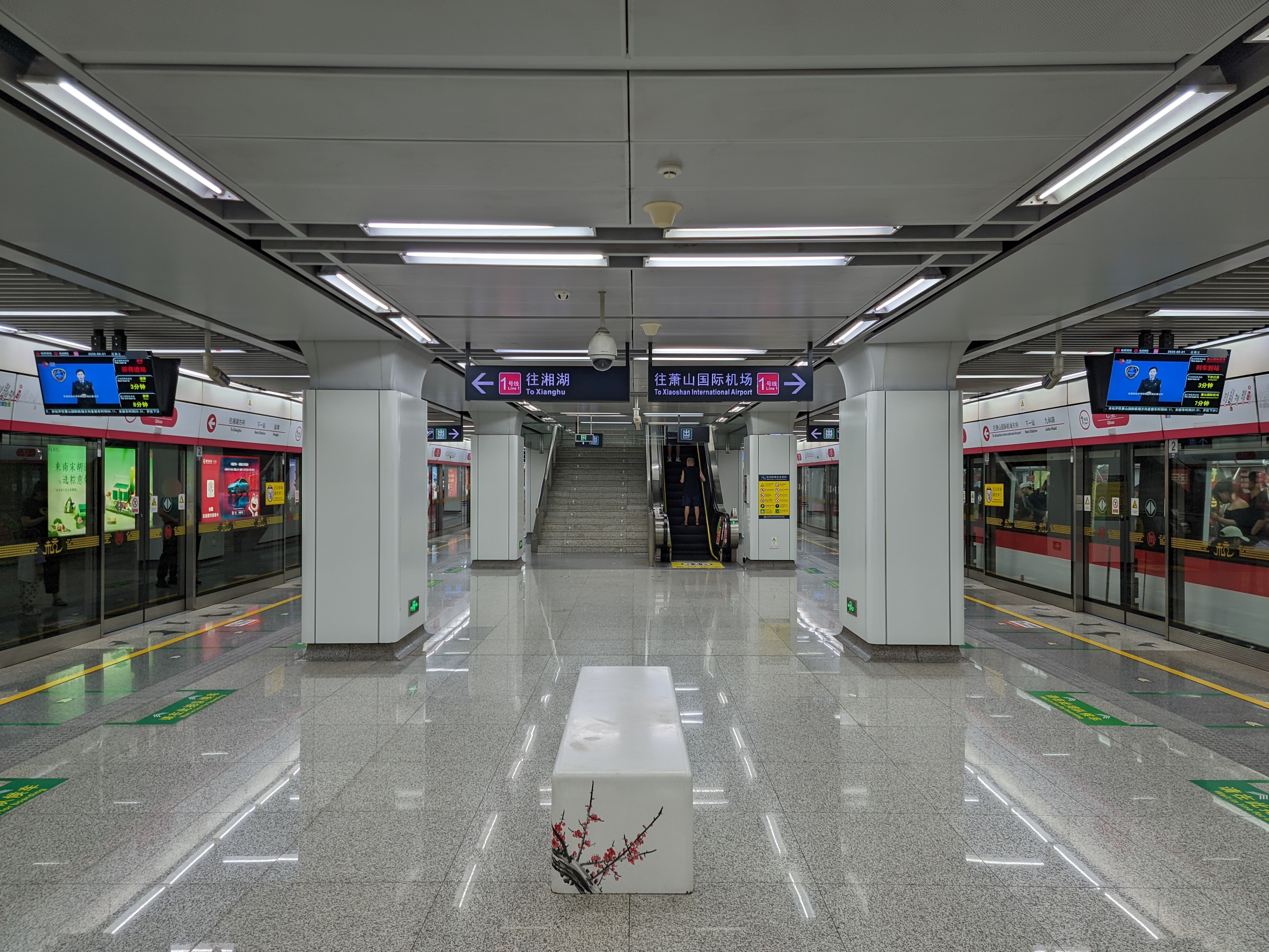
Platforms

== Entrances/exits ==
- A: Youth City
- B: Hangzhou Metro Group Co., Ltd.
- C: Tie Hui Development Center
- D: Jiuhe Road
