= Jiuhe Road station =

Hangzhou Metro station

Coordinates: 30°18′29″N 120°14′54″E

Jiuhe Road 九和路
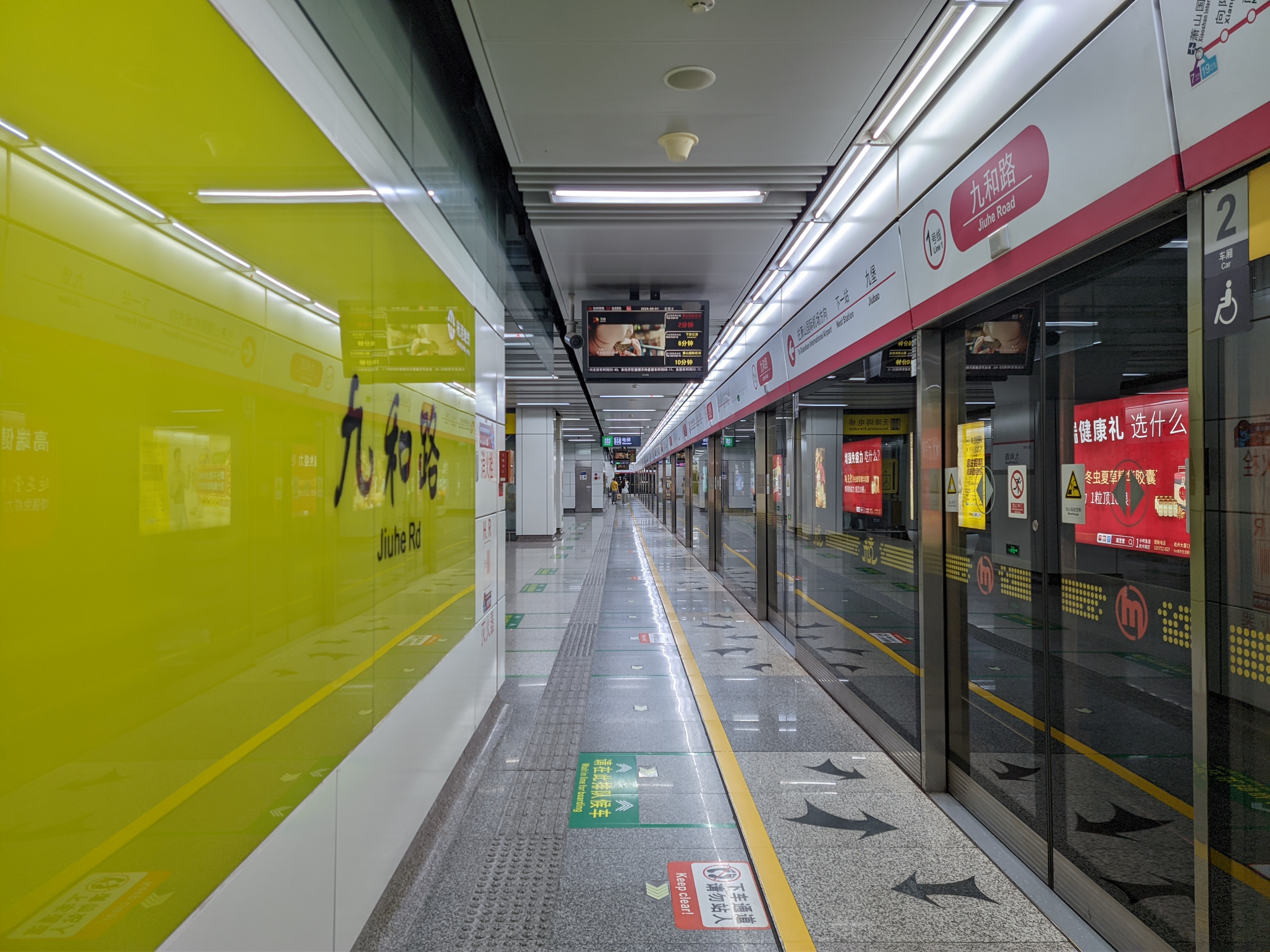
- Platform

General information
- Location: Jianggan District, Hangzhou, Zhejiang; China
- Operated by: Hangzhou Metro Corporation
- Line: Line 1

Services
Preceding station	Hangzhou Metro	Following station
Qibao towards Xianghu	Line 1	Jiubao towards Xiaoshan International Airport
Location

Jiuhe Road (Chinese: 九和路) is a station on Line 1 of the Hangzhou Metro in China. It was opened in November 2012, together with the rest of the stations on Line 1. It is located in the Jianggan District of Hangzhou.
