= Pengbu station =

Hangzhou Metro station

Coordinates: 30°17′48″N 120°13′12″E

Pengbu 彭埠
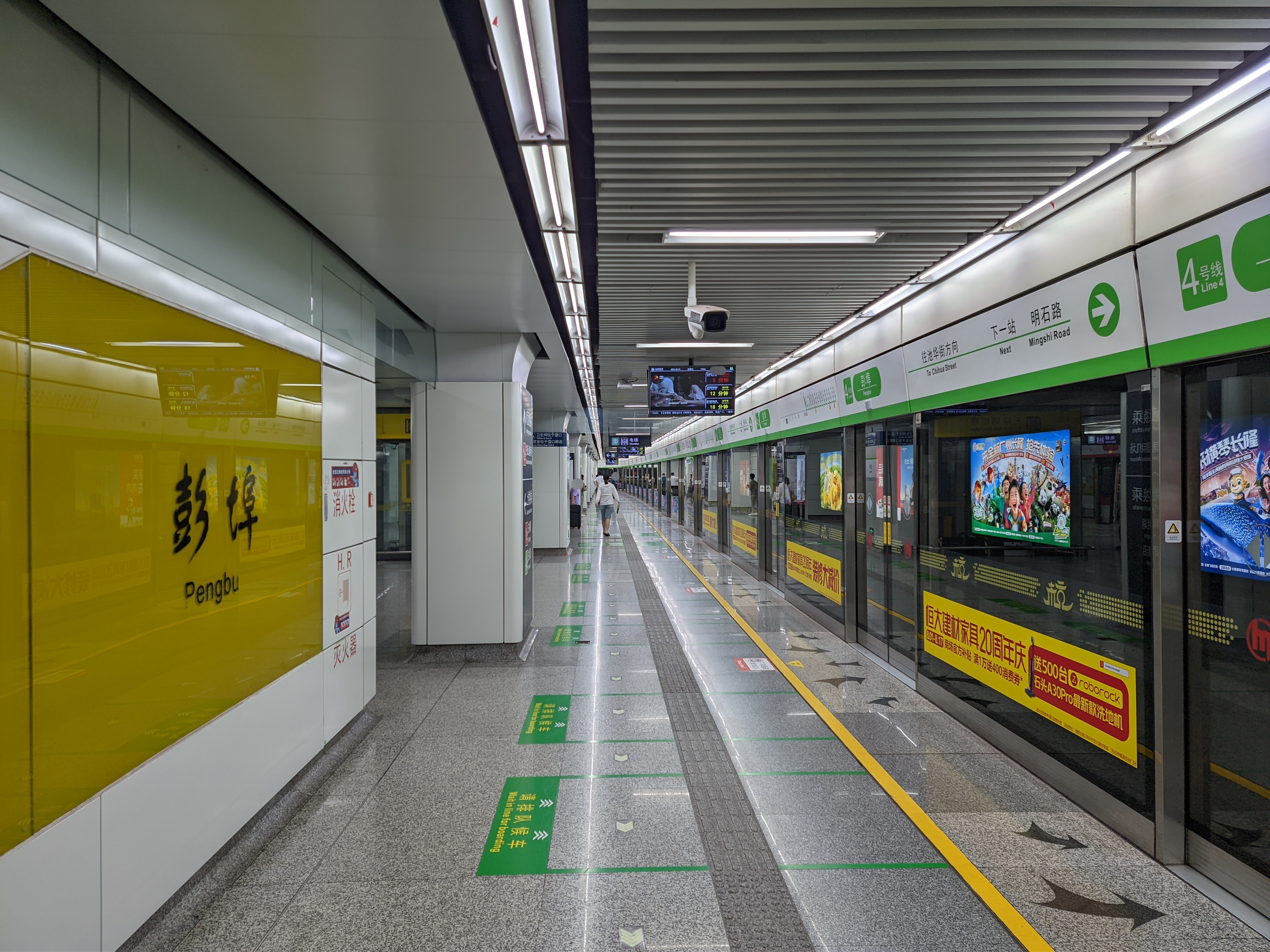
- Platform of Line 4

General information
- Location: Shangcheng District, Hangzhou, Zhejiang; China
- Operated by: Hangzhou Metro Corporation
- Lines: Line 1; Line 4
- Platforms: 4 (2 island platforms)

Services
Preceding station	Hangzhou Metro	Following station
East Railway Station towards Xianghu	Line 1	Qibao towards Xiaoshan International Airport
East Railway Station towards Puyan	Line 4	Mingshi Road towards Chihua Street
Location

Pengbu (Chinese: 彭埠) is a transfer station on Line 1 and Line 4 of the Hangzhou Metro in China. It was opened in November 2012, together with the rest of the stations on Line 1. It is located in the Shangcheng District of Hangzhou. This station offers cross-platform interchange.

== Station Layout ==
G	Exits
B1	Concourse	Transfer passage, Tickets, Customer Service Center
B2	← Line 1 towards Xianghu (East Railway Station)
Island platform, doors will open on the left
← Line 4 towards Puyan (East Railway Station)
Line 4 towards Chihua Street (Mingshi Road) →
Island platform, doors will open on the right
Line 1 towards Xiaoshan International Airport (Qibao)→

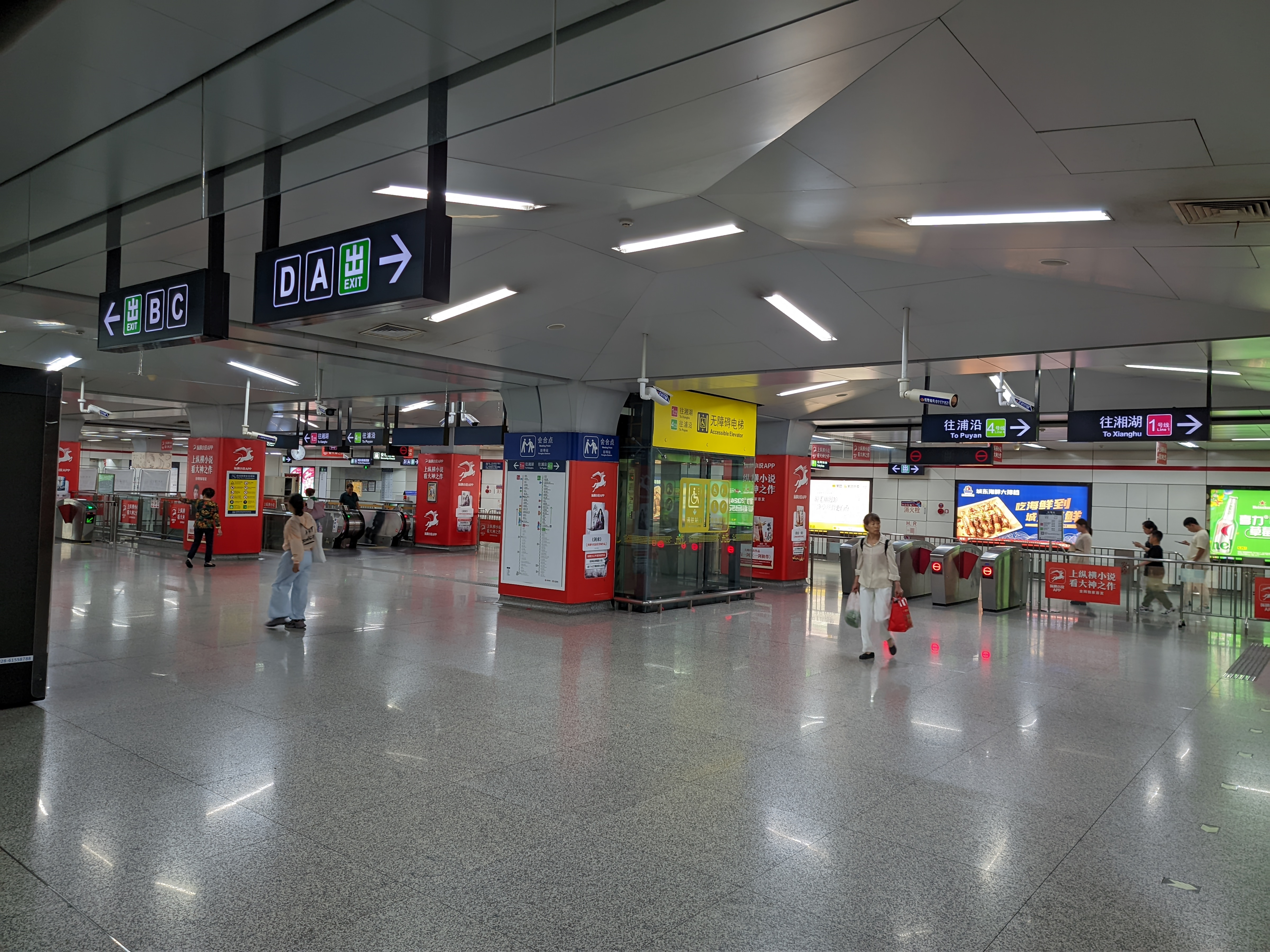
Concourse

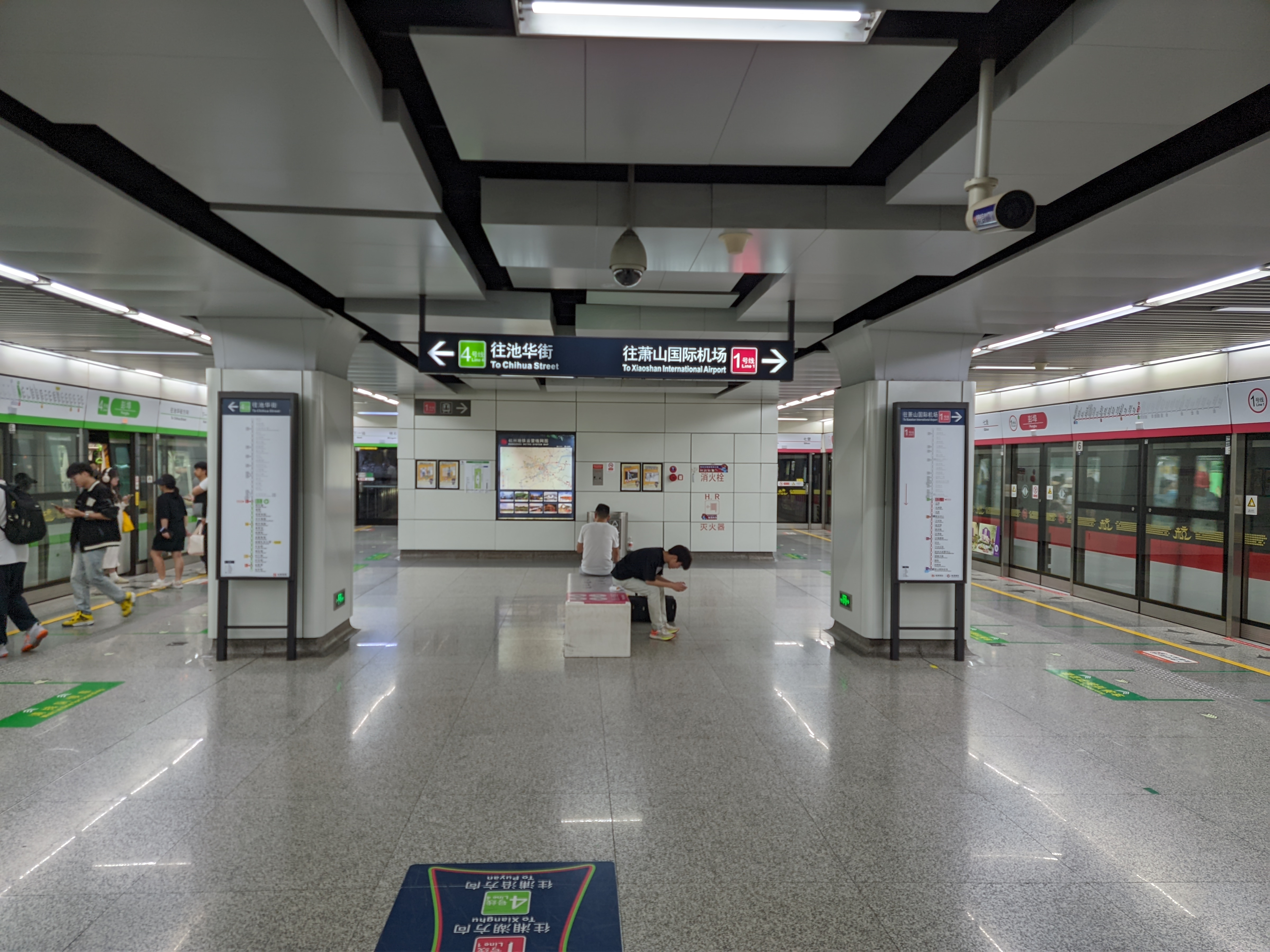
Platform

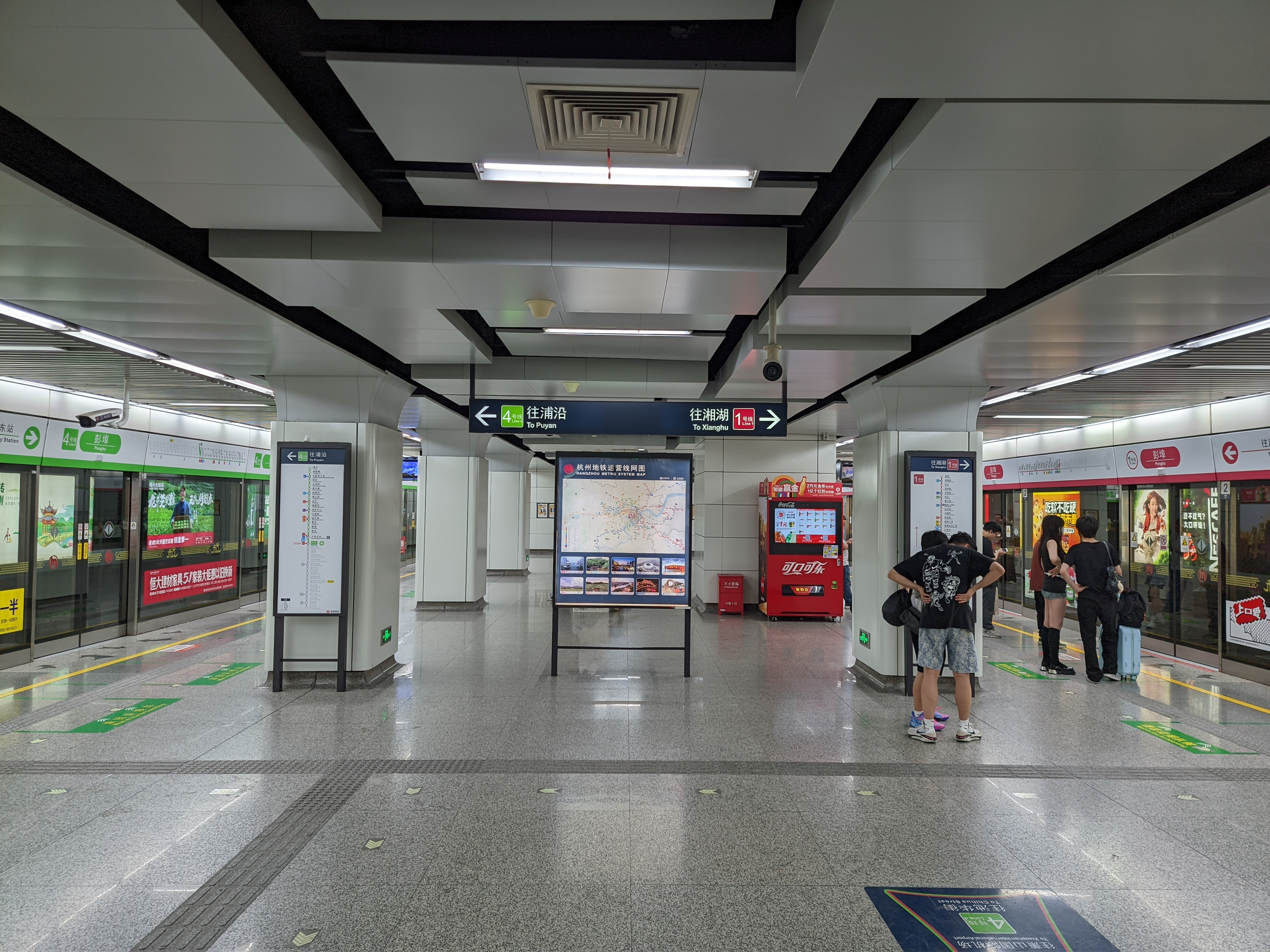
Platform
