= Ningbo railway station =

Railway station in Ningbo, China

Coordinates: 29°51′53″N 121°31′57″E

Ningbo 宁波
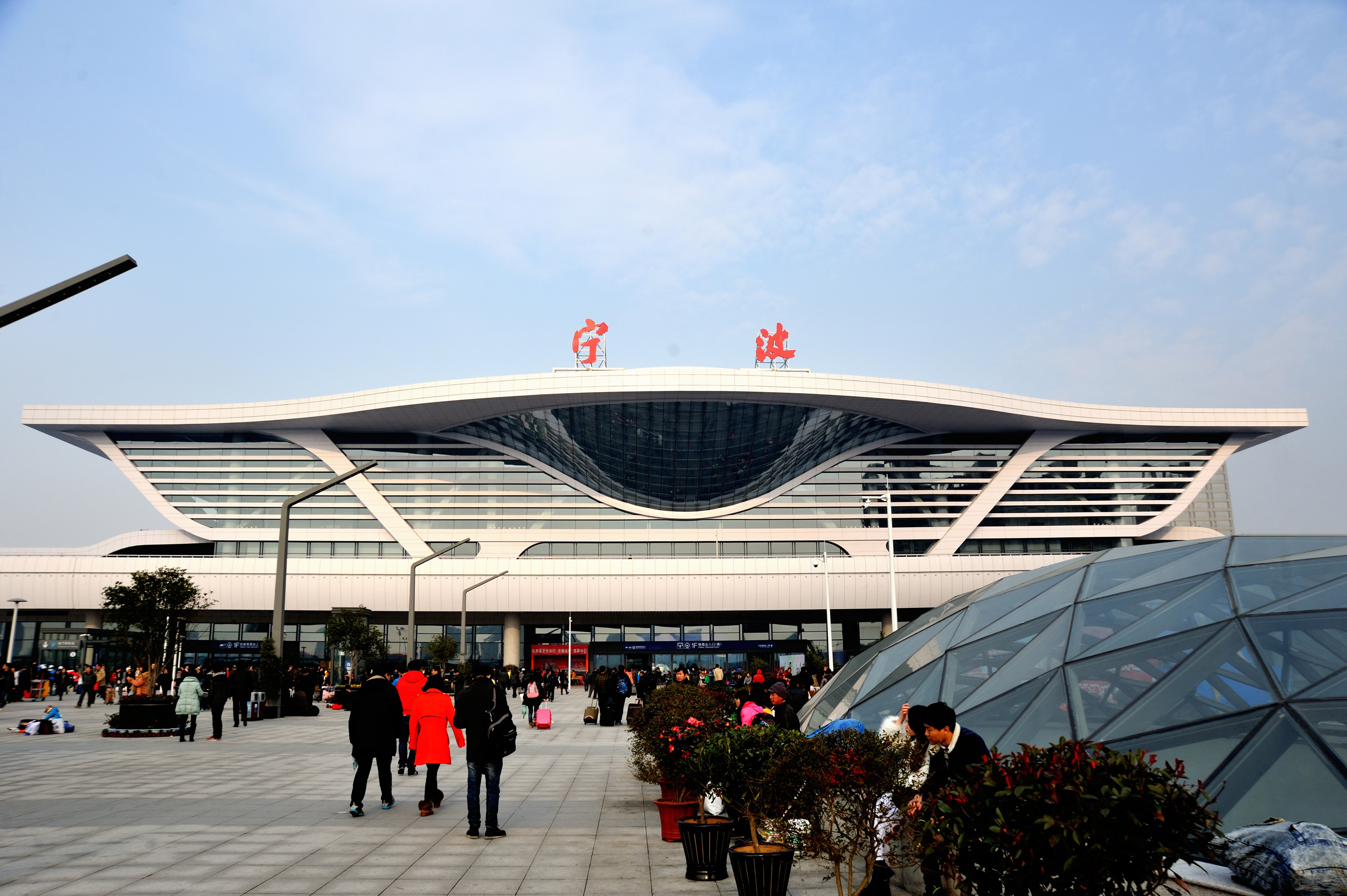
- Ningbo railway station

General information
- Location: Nanzhan Donglu, Haishu District, Ningbo, Zhejiang; China
- Operated by: Shanghai Railway Bureau, China Railway
- Lines: Xiaoshan–Ningbo railway; Ningbo–Taizhou–Wenzhou railway; Hangzhou–Ningbo high-speed railway; Ningbo–Zhoushan railway (planned); Nantong–Ningbo high-speed railway (planned)
- Platforms: 14
- Connections: Metro station; Bus terminal

History
- Opened: September 30, 1959; 66 years ago
Location

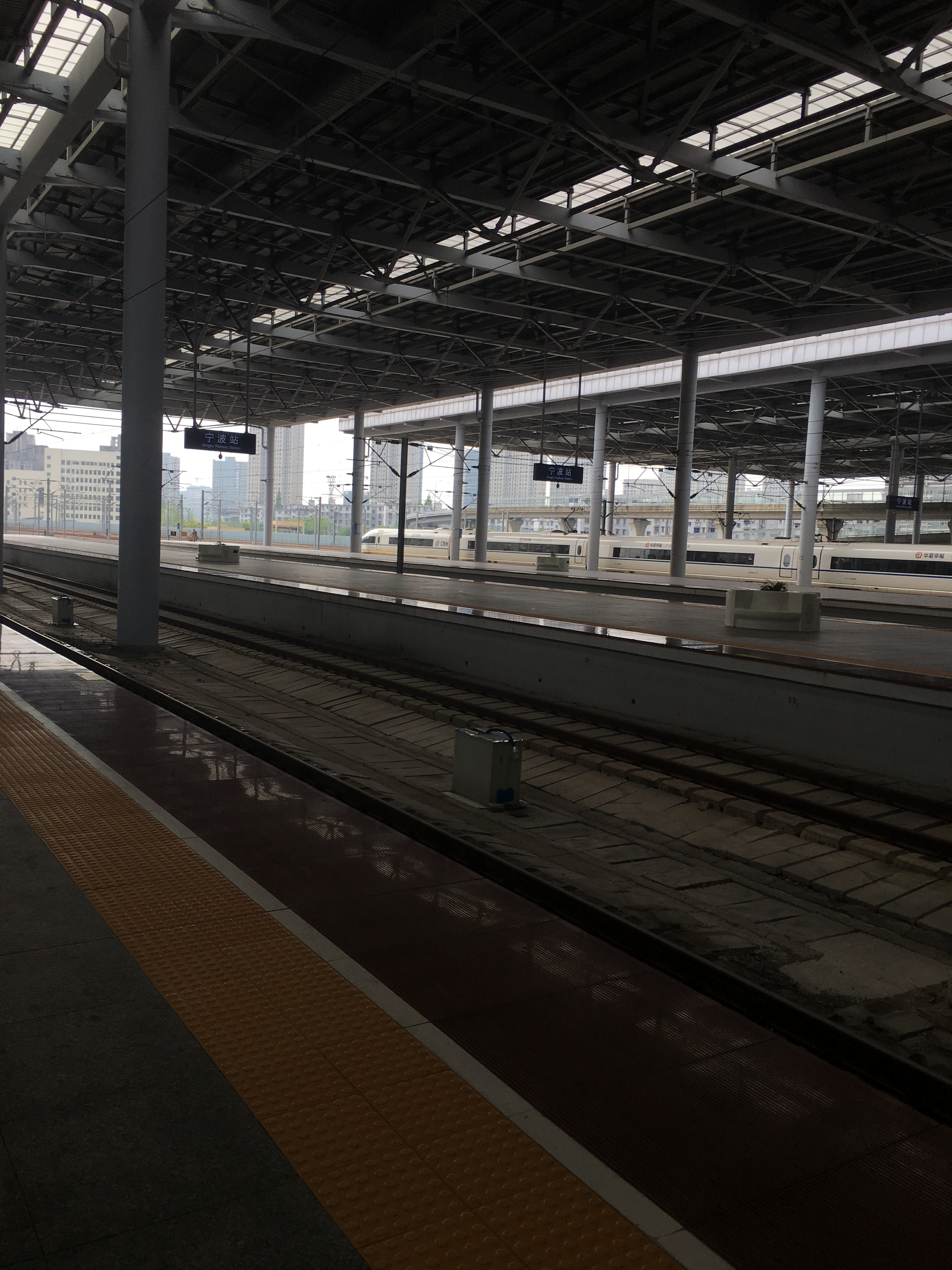
Ningbo railway station platforms

Ningbo railway station (simplified Chinese: 宁波站; traditional Chinese: 寧波站; pinyin: Níngbō zhàn) is a railway station on the Xiaoshan–Ningbo railway, Ningbo–Taizhou–Wenzhou railway and Hangzhou–Ningbo high-speed railway located in Haishu District, Ningbo, Zhejiang, China.

== History ==
The station opened on September 30, 1959. From September 8, 2010, Ningbo East railway station became the place for all passengers departing and arriving in Ningbo while the main railway station described above closed for a two-year renovation. Starting from December 28, 2013, Ningbo railway station opened again, and Ningbo East railway station became an auxiliary station which stopped transporting passengers.

== See also ==
- Ningbo East railway station
- Ningbo railway station (Ningbo Rail Transit)

Preceding station	China Railway High-speed	Following station
Zhuangqiao towards Hangzhou East	Hangzhou–Ningbo high-speed railway	Terminus
Terminus	Ningbo–Taizhou–Wenzhou railway	Ningbo East towards Wenzhou South
Preceding station	China Railway	Following station
Zhuangqiao towards Hangzhou South	Xiaoshan–Ningbo railway	Terminus
