= Hangzhou East railway station =

Hangzhou Metro and high-speed rail station

Hangzhoudong 杭州东
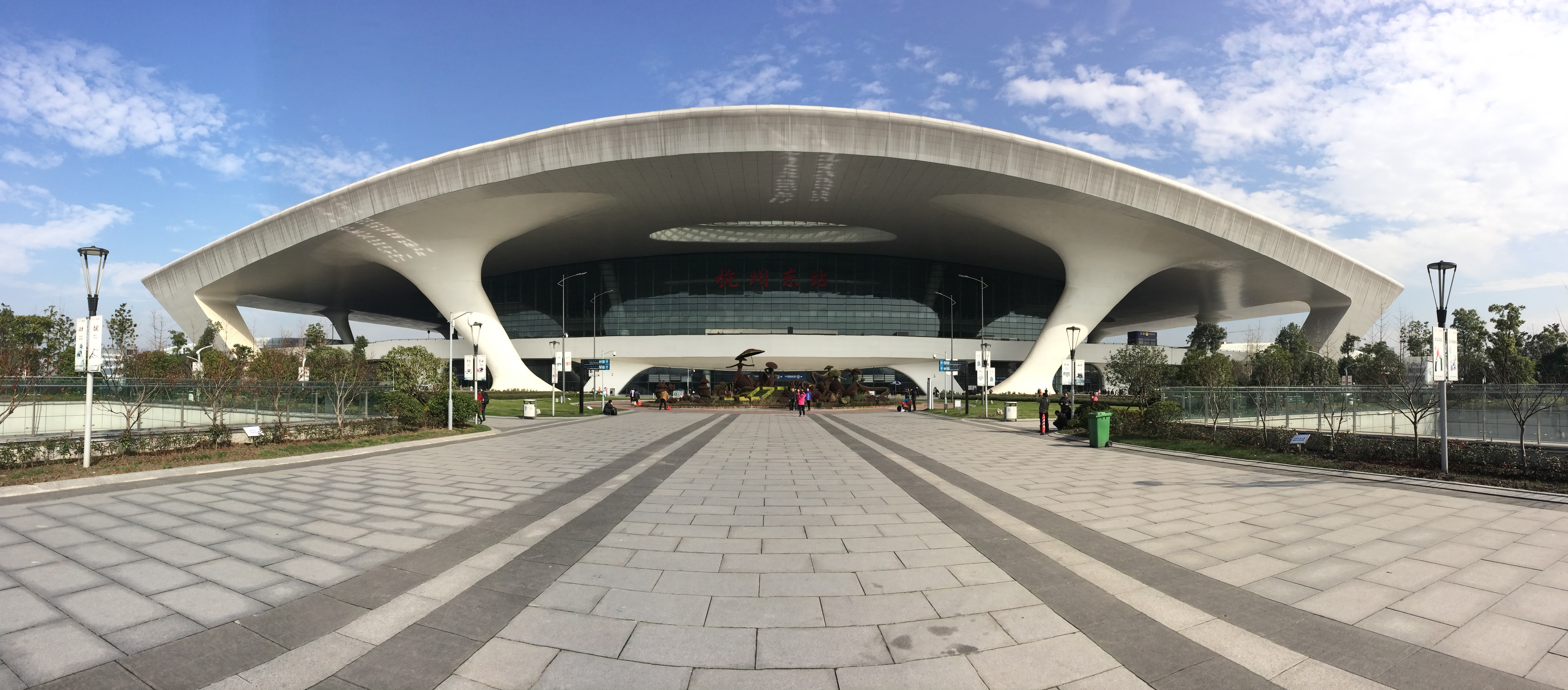
- Hangzhou East railway station

General information
- Other names: Hangzhou East
- Location: Tiancheng Road, Shangcheng District, Hangzhou, Zhejiang; China
- Coordinates: 30°17′36.6″N 120°12′30.1″E
- Operated by: China Railway Shanghai Group, China Railway Corporation
- Lines: Nanjing–Hangzhou high-speed railway; Hangzhou–Ningbo high-speed railway; Shanghai–Kunming high-speed railway; Hangzhou–Huangshan intercity railway; Shanghai–Kunming railway; Hangzhou–Taizhou high-speed railway
- Connections: East Railway Station & East Railway Station (East Square)

Other information
- Station code: TMIS code: 32001 or 90041; Telegraph code: HGH; Pinyin code: HZD
- Classification: Top Class station

History
- Opened: 1992 (original)
- Closed: 2010 (original)
- Rebuilt: 1 July 2013; 12 years ago
Location

Hangzhoudong (Hangzhou East) railway station (simplified Chinese: 杭州东站; traditional Chinese: 杭州東站; pinyin: Hángzhōudōng zhàn) is a railway station located in Shangcheng District, Hangzhou, Zhejiang, People's Republic of China. Originally built as a small station serving the Shanghai-Kunming railway, it has been rebuilt as a high-speed rail hub, which became operational on 1 July 2013.

== History ==
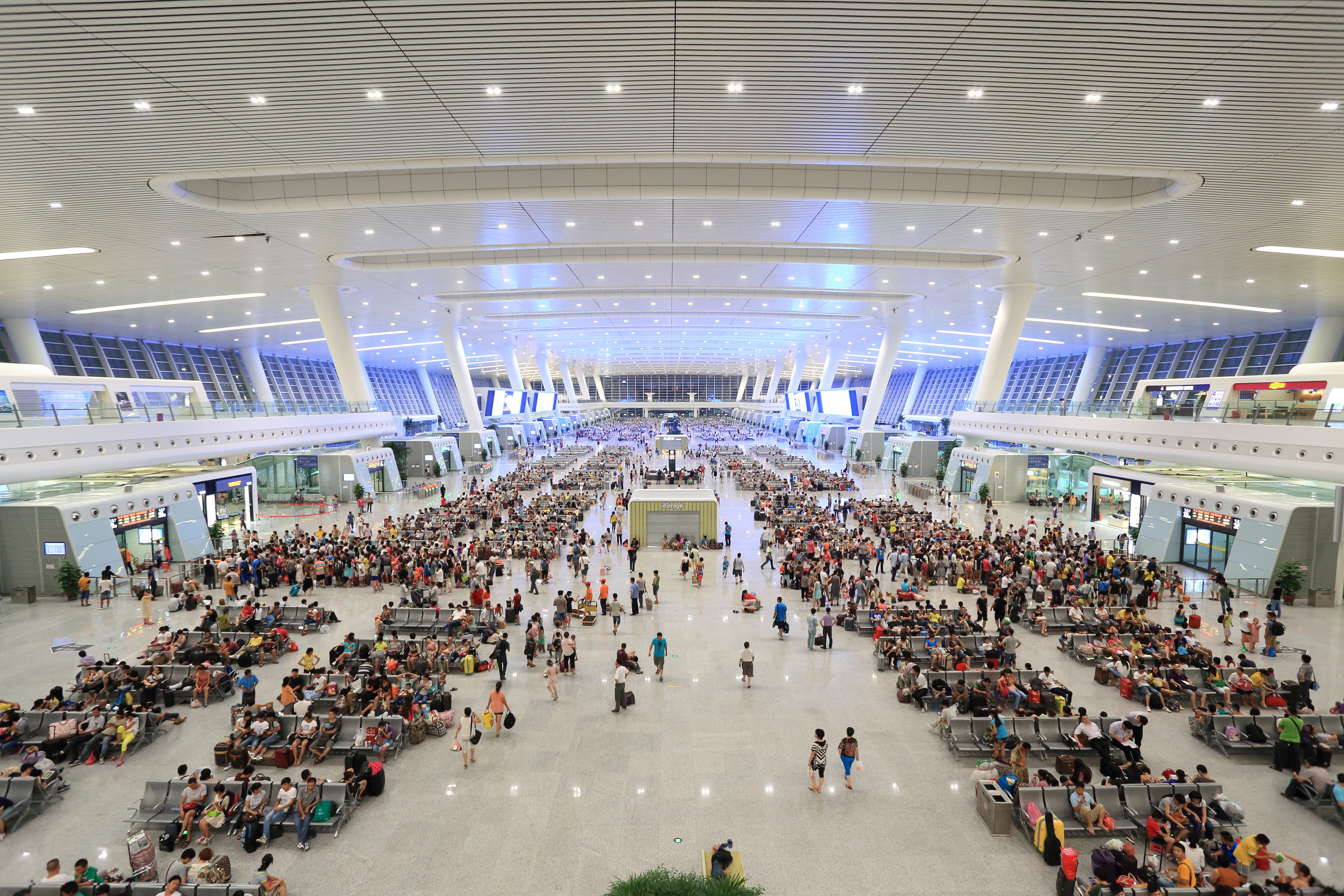
Interior view of waiting area

The old station opened in 1992, located on Tiancheng Road. It was closed on 20 January 2010, and demolished. Its train services were moved to Hangzhou railway station and Hangzhou South railway station.

A new station was built on the site. It officially opened on 1 July 2013, in conjunction with the opening of the Hangzhou–Ningbo High-Speed Railway and Nanjing–Hangzhou Passenger Railway. The station also serves the Shanghai–Hangzhou Passenger Railway. It has 30 railway tracks, and stations for Hangzhou Metro lines 1 and 4. A coach station and bus terminals are also part of the new transit hub.

== Metro station ==
=== Lines 1 & 4 ===
East Railway Station 火车东站
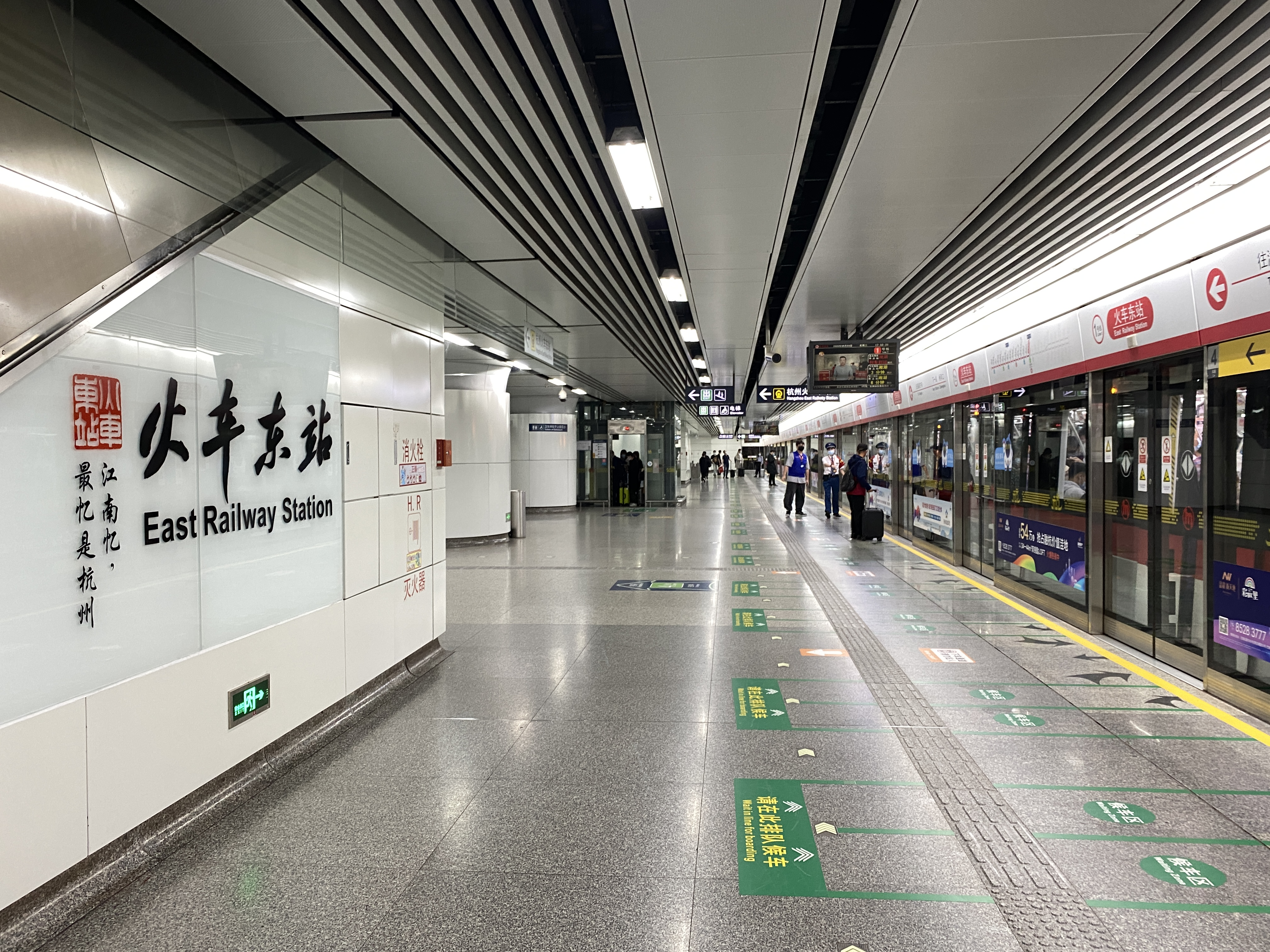
- Line 1 platform towards Xianghu

General information
- Location: Hangzhou East railway station Shangcheng District, Hangzhou, Zhejiang; China
- Operated by: Hangzhou MTR Corporation; Hangzhou Metro Corporation
- Lines: Line 1 Line 4
- Platforms: 4 (2 island platforms)
- Connections: Hangzhou East railway station Line 6 Line 19 (via East Railway Station (East Square))

History
- Opened: 30 June 2013 (Line 1); 2 February 2015 (Line 4)

Services
Preceding station	Hangzhou Metro	Following station
Zhalongkou towards Xianghu	Line 1	Pengbu towards Xiaoshan International Airport
Xinfeng towards Puyan	Line 4	Pengbu towards Chihua Street
Route map
Location

Hangzhou East railway station is served by a station of the name of East Railway Station on Line 1 and Line 4 of Hangzhou Metro.

==== Station layout ====
East Railway Station has three levels: basement 1 is in the railway arrival hall, and metro exits is at this level. Basement 2 is a concourse. Basement 3 are platforms. This station offers paired cross-platform interchange for passengers riding between 4 directions of the two lines.

==== Entrances/exits ====
The station has 7 exits. The elevator exit is at the miidle of the concourse.

- A: Railway arrivals (north No. 4-5)
- B: Railway arrivals (north No. 2-3)
- C1: Railway arrivals (north No. 1-2)
- C2: Railway arrivals (south No. 1-2)
- C3: West square
- D: Railway arrivals (south No. 2-3)
- E: East square

=== Line 6 & 19 ===
The metro station for Line 6 and Line 19 is a separate station called "East Railway Station (East Square)".

== Around the station ==
- Hangzhou Mosque

== See also ==
- Hangzhou railway station
- Hangzhou South railway station
- Hangzhou West railway station

Preceding station	China Railway High-speed	Following station
Deqing towards Nanjing South	Nanjing–Hangzhou high-speed railway	Terminus
Terminus	Hangzhou–Ningbo high-speed railway	Hangzhou South towards Ningbo
Linping South towards Shanghai Hongqiao	Shanghai–Kunming high-speed railway	Hangzhou South towards Kunming South
Terminus	Hangzhou–Taizhou high-speed railway	Hangzhou South towards Yuhuan
Preceding station	China Railway	Following station
Jianqiao towards Shanghai or Shanghai South	Shanghai–Kunming railway	Hangzhou South towards Kunming
