= Hangzhou–Ningbo high-speed railway =

Railway line in Zhejiang, China

Hangzhou–Fuzhou–Shenzhen high-speed railway Hangzhou–Ningbo Section
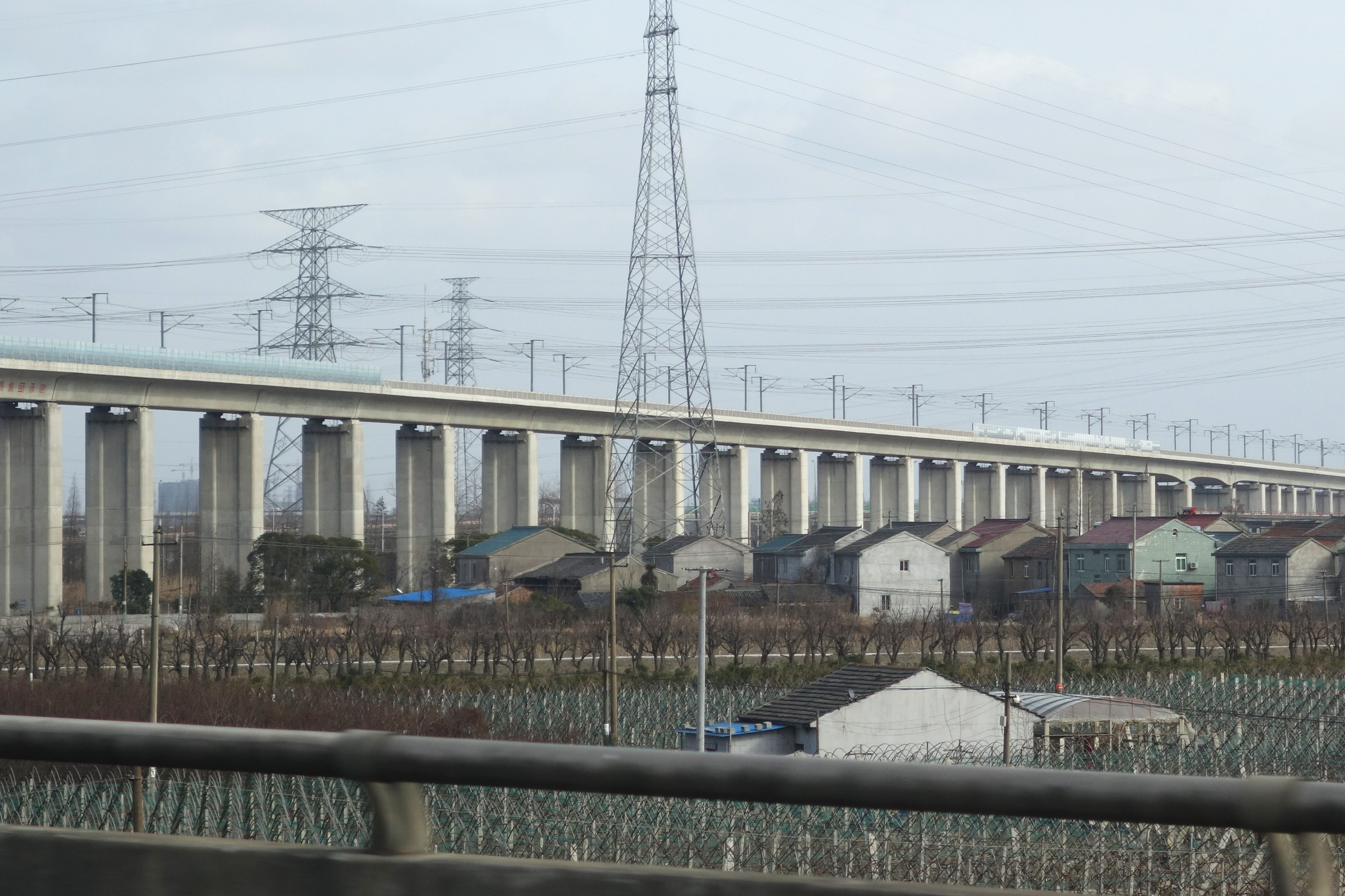
- A viaduct of Hangzhou-Ningbo HSR in Ningbo

Overview
- Native name: 杭福深高速铁路杭甬段
- Status: Operational
- Owner: CR Shanghai; Hangzhou–Ningbo Railway Company Limited
- Locale: Hangzhou, Shaoxing and Ningbo; Zhejiang province
- Termini: Hangzhou East; Ningbo

Service
- Type: High-speed rail
- System: China Railway High-speed
- Operator(s): CR Shanghai

History
- Opened: July 1, 2013

Technical
- Track gauge: 1,435 mm (4 ft 8 1/2 in) standard gauge
- Electrification: 25 kV 50 Hz AC (Overhead line)
Route map

Hangyong Section
- Chinese: 杭甬段
- Literal meaning: Hangzhou–Ningbo Section [of the Hangzhou–Shenzhen Railway Corridor]
Transcriptions
Standard Mandarin
- Hanyu Pinyin: Háng–Yǒng duàn
- Wade–Giles: Hang–Yung Tuan

Hangyong High-Speed Railway
- Traditional Chinese: 杭甬客運專線
- Simplified Chinese: 杭甬客运专线
- Literal meaning: Hangzhou–Ningbo Dedicated Passenger Transport Line
Transcriptions
Standard Mandarin
- Hanyu Pinyin: Háng–Yǒng kèyùn zhuānxiàn
- Wade–Giles: Hang–Yung K'o-yün Chuan-hsien

The Hangzhou–Ningbo or Hangyong high-speed railway is a high-speed railway corridor between the prefecture-level cities of Hangzhou, Shaoxing, and Ningbo in Zhejiang Province in eastern China, part of the larger Hangzhou–Shenzhen high-speed railway. Running parallel to the Xiaoshan–Ningbo railway, the Hangzhou–Ningbo high-speed railway spans approximately 150 km (93 mi) with a design speed of 350 km/h (220 mph).

== Names ==
The Chinese name of the railway corridor is the Hangyong or Hang–Yong section or passenger-dedicated railway. This name reflects the Chinese abbreviations 杭 (Háng) for Hangzhou and 甬 (Yǒng) for Ningbo, the later from the name of its major river.

== History ==
The railway was initially scheduled to open in June 2012. This was later postponed to the end of 2012 and, in October 2012, the target date was postponed once again. Test operations began at the start of 2013 and commercial operations began on 30 June 2013. It now forms the northern end of the Hangzhou–Fuzhou–Shenzhen high-speed railway.

== See also ==
- High-speed rail in China
- Hangzhou–Fuzhou–Shenzhen high-speed railway
