= Real-name system for train tickets in China =

Chinese railway ticket policy

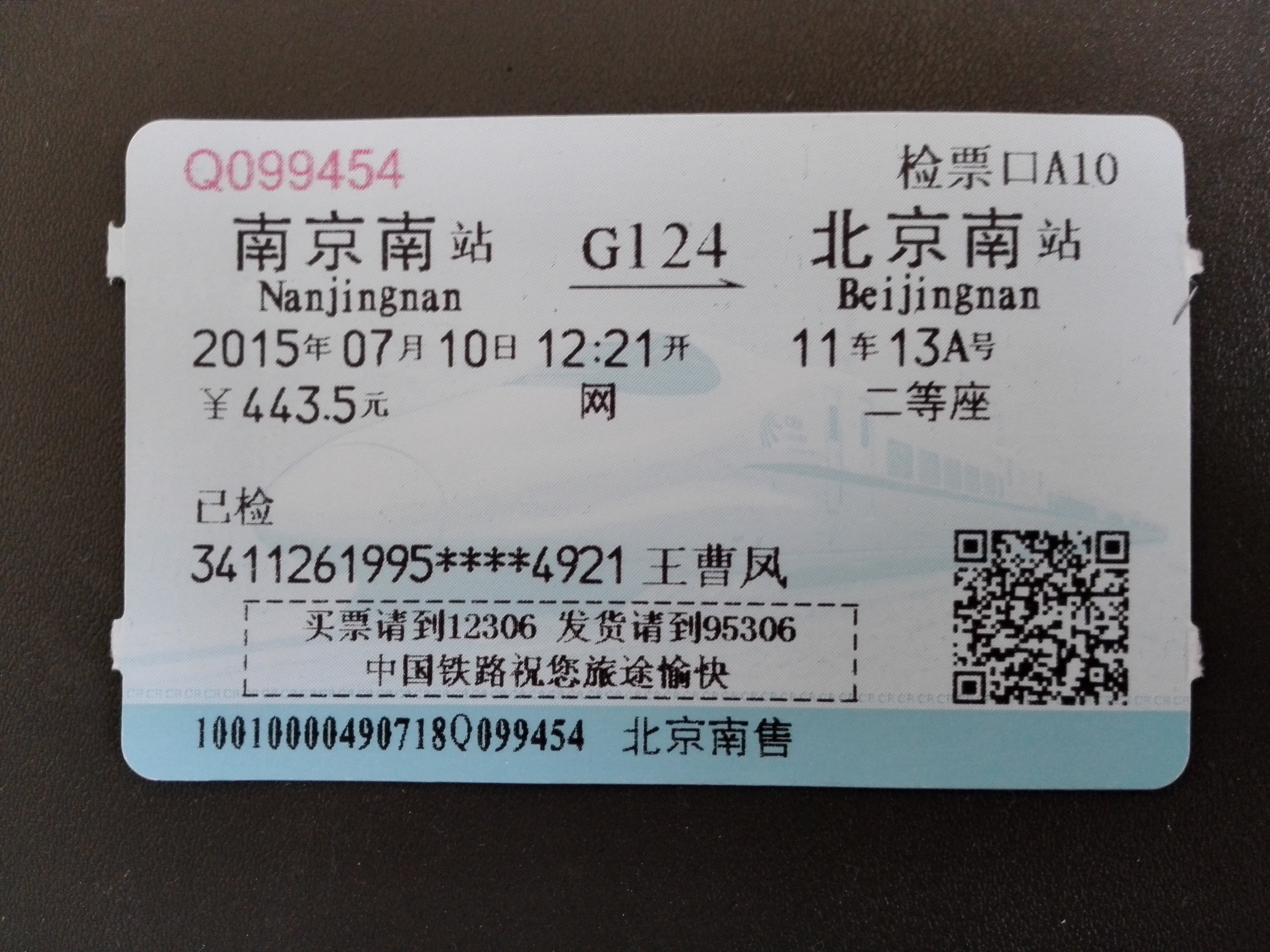
Adult tickets printed with the passenger's name and citizen ID number after the real-name system was implemented

The real-name system for train tickets in China refers to a system in which every ticket office, agency and Hong Kong section of the Guangzhou–Shenzhen–Hong Kong Express Rail Link at every railway station in mainland China implements real-name registration for passengers purchasing tickets.

== History ==
During the Spring Festival travel rush every year, a large number of passengers in mainland China have no tickets to buy and have to buy expensive tickets from scalpers. The real-name system can effectively combat ticket scalping. Although the real-name system cannot fundamentally solve the problem of "tickets are hard to come by" on China's railways, it can make the sale of train tickets relatively fair. The public has been calling for a real-name system for train tickets for many years. On the one hand, most train ticket sales outlets and train station ticket offices are involved in secret or semi-public ticket scalping; on the other hand, the implementation of the real-name system requires updating work procedures and increasing management costs. Therefore, the railway department cannot gain any benefits from the real-name system. Therefore, the Ministry of Railways does not agree to implement the real-name system for its own interests.

On January 8, 2010, the Ministry of Railways officially announced that it would pilot a real-name system for train tickets at some stations of Guangzhou Railway Group and Chengdu Railway Bureau during the 2010 Spring Festival travel season.

In 2011, the Wuhan-Guangzhou High-Speed Railway, the Zhengzhou-Xi'an High-Speed Railway, and some stations of the Wuhan Railway Bureau first tried out real-name ticketing. From June 1, 2011, the real-name system was implemented for EMU tickets nationwide. All EMU tickets (G, C, D prefixes) except the Shanghai Jinshan Intercity Railway have been fully implemented with the real-name system.

Starting from the first day of 2012, most train tickets in mainland China have been issued with real names. Passengers can also purchase tickets by phone or online. However, the documents required for online ticket purchases are limited to the following four types: "Resident Identity Card of the People's Republic of China", "Mainland Travel Permit for Hong Kong and Macao Residents", "Mainland Travel Permit for Taiwan Residents", and "Passport". For the Beijing -Kowloon Through Train, Shanghai-Kowloon Through Train, Guangzhou-Kowloon Through Train and international trains between the mainland and Hong Kong, passengers must present valid documents such as passports before boarding the train, so the real name system is not implemented. Some non-EMU trains under the jurisdiction of some railway bureaus, as well as a few short-distance bus-like routes (such as Beijing S2 Line trains, Shanghai Jinshan Intercity Trains, Qiluan Railway Trains, Ningbo-Yuyao Trains, Shaoxing-Shangyu Trains, etc.) do not implement the real name system either. However, online ticket purchases require real name registration, so when purchasing tickets for the above trains online, the passenger's ID number must still be entered.

The Hong Kong section of the Guangzhou-Shenzhen-Hong Kong High Speed Rail, which opened on September 23, 2018, also adopts a real-name ticketing system.

On February 1, 2020, in order to strengthen the prevention and control of the 2019 novel coronavirus disease, ticket purchasers must provide the mobile phone number used by each passenger. Minors, the elderly and other key passengers, as well as passengers without mobile phones, can provide the mobile phone number of their guardians or relatives who can be contacted in time. Passengers from Hong Kong, Macao and Taiwan, and foreign passengers can provide email addresses. The railway department will verify the authenticity of the mobile phone number when necessary. Failure to pass the verification will affect the passenger's continued ticket purchase. This measure was first implemented on the 12306 website (including the mobile client).

== National railway trains that do not implement the system ==
The following railway trains do not implement the system:

- Non-EMU trains under the jurisdiction of some railway bureaus
- Line S2, Beijing Suburban Railway
- Shanghai Suburban Railway Jinshan Line
- Qiluan Railway Train
- Ningbo–Yuyao intercity railway
- Trains between Shaoxing and Shangyu (Shaoxing Urban Rail Line)

== Valid ID ==
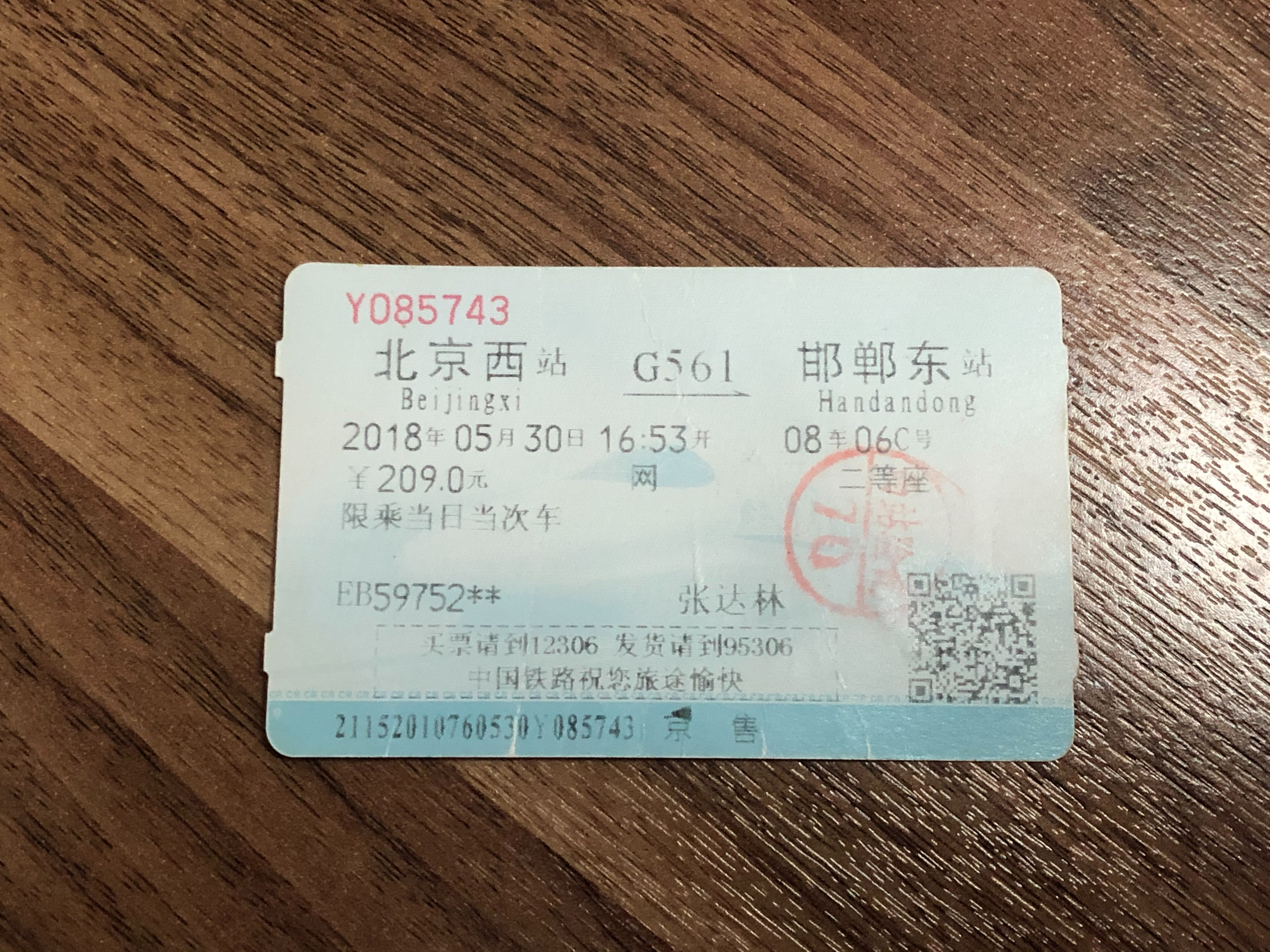
Train tickets purchased with passport

To purchase a real-name ticket, citizens must present one of the following documents:

- Resident ID card
- Temporary ID card
- Passport
- Household register
- Travel Permit of the People's Republic of China
- Chinese People's Liberation Army Military Security Card
- Military ID
- Armed Police Officer Certificate
- Soldier's ID
- Military student certificate
- Military Civilian Officer Certificate
- Military Retired Officer Certificate
- Military employee ID
- A valid passport that can be used as required
- Mainland Travel Permit for Hong Kong and Macau Residents
- Travel Permit to Hong Kong and Macau
- Mainland Travel Permit for Taiwan Residents
- Taiwan Travel Permit
- Residence permit for foreigners
- Foreigner Entry and Exit Permit
- Diplomat ID
- Consulate certificate
- Seaman's Certificate
- Foreigner Identity Certificate issued by the Ministry of Foreign Affairs
- Passport loss report issued by the local public security agency's exit and entry administration department
- Temporary identity certificate for passenger trains issued by the railway public security department

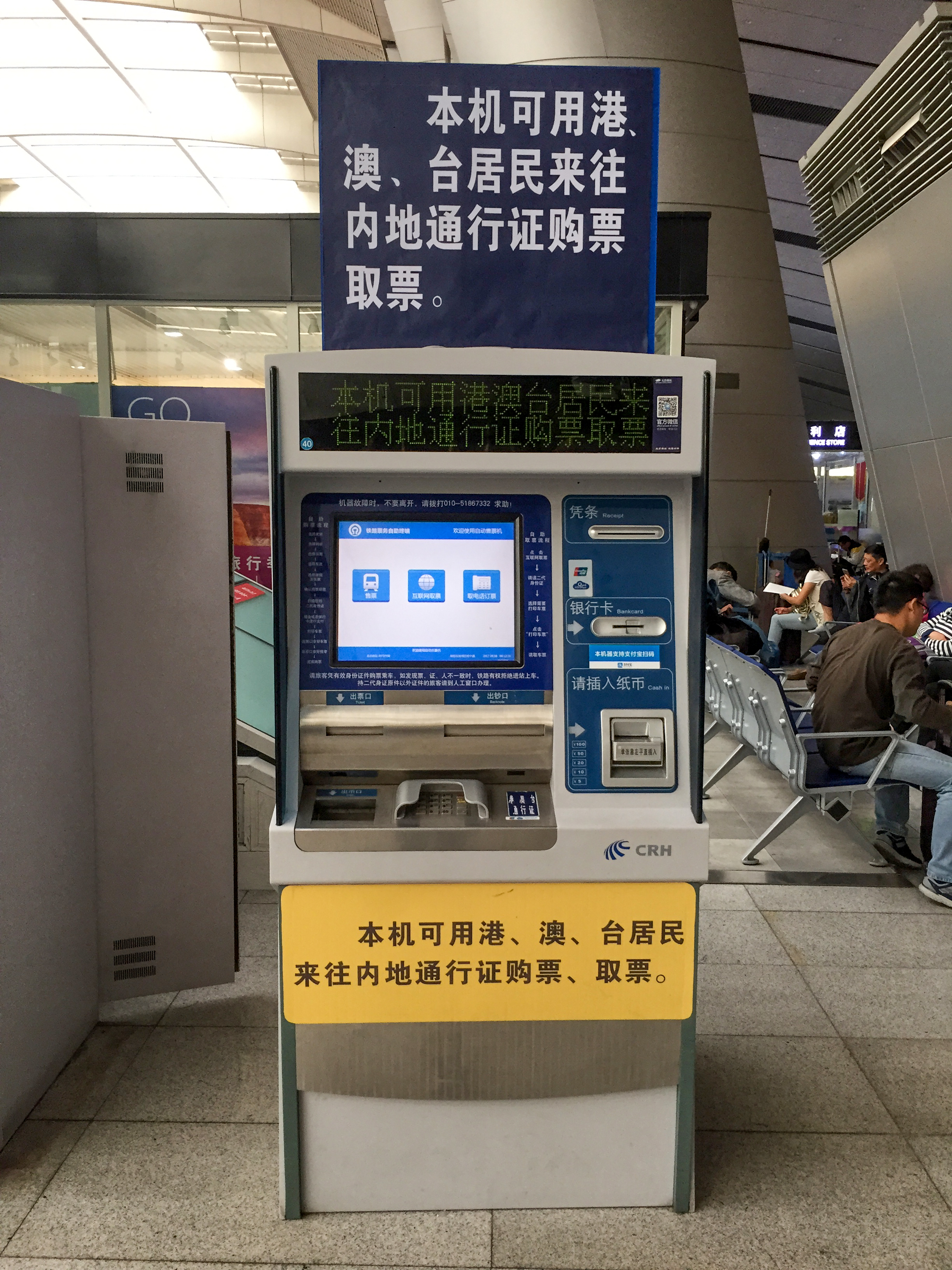
An automatic ticket vending machine on the departure level of Beijing South Railway Station that accepts Home Return Permits and Taiwan Compatriot Permits

In February 2010, nine new valid certificates were added:

- Residential register
- Resident residence certificate (with photo)
- Temporary Resident Permit (with photo)
- Expired Resident Identity Card
- Driver's license
- Student ID card
- Discharge Certificate
- Release certificate
- Rescue certificate

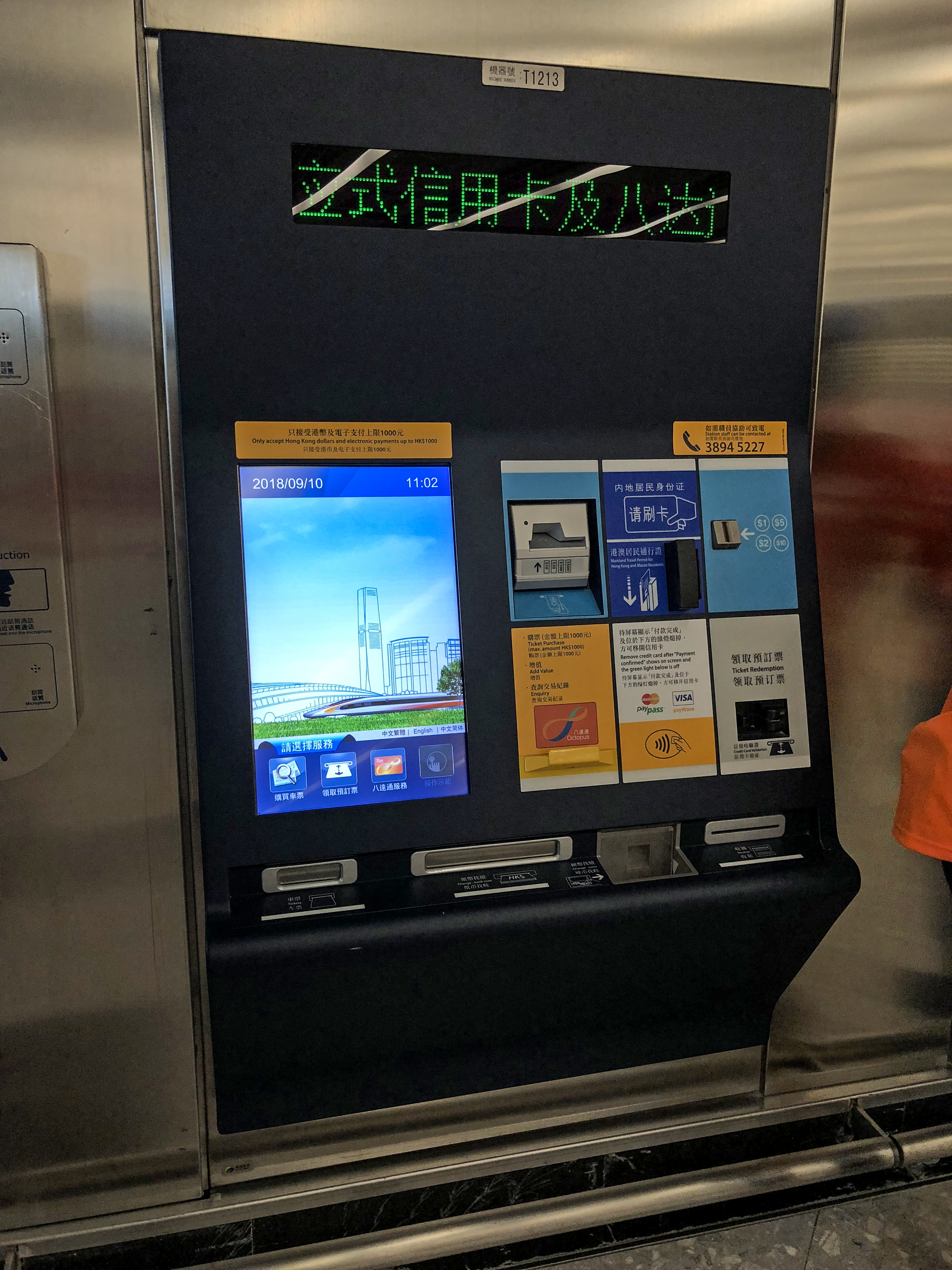
The old MTR ticket vending machine at Hong Kong West Kowloon Station supports the use of mainland Chinese ID cards and Hong Kong and Macau Resident Passes

According to the regulations, the nine new types of documents cannot be used to purchase tickets directly at the ticket counter. However, you can apply to the public security bureau for a temporary identity certificate to purchase tickets with these documents.

On June 25, 2023, military sergeant ID and police ID were added as documents acceptable for purchasing tickets.

Railway tickets and special tickets can also be used as valid documents for real-name travel. Railway tickets include: hard seat regular tickets throughout the year; soft seat regular tickets throughout the year; hard seat temporary regular tickets; soft seat tickets; hard seat tickets; commuter (school) tickets; medical tickets; convenience tickets; regular commuter tickets; visiting relatives tickets; grain purchase tickets. Special tickets include: the national railway general ticket; soft seat ticket used by confidential communications personnel at the provincial level and above; free tickets used by the postal department for confidential communications personnel who are restricted to mail vehicles and designated railway locations, free tickets for post office escorts, and free tickets for post office inspectors; the People's Republic of China Railway Free Ticket used by foreign railway delegations invited by China Railway; the national railway free ticket used by other government departments and news organizations invited by the railway authority of the State Council to inspect railway work; special railway tickets; dispatch orders used for loading and unloading operations and emergency rescue at foreign stations; written certificates of free round-trip rides used by customs, border guards, and banks at port stations, etc.

== Schedule Conflict ==
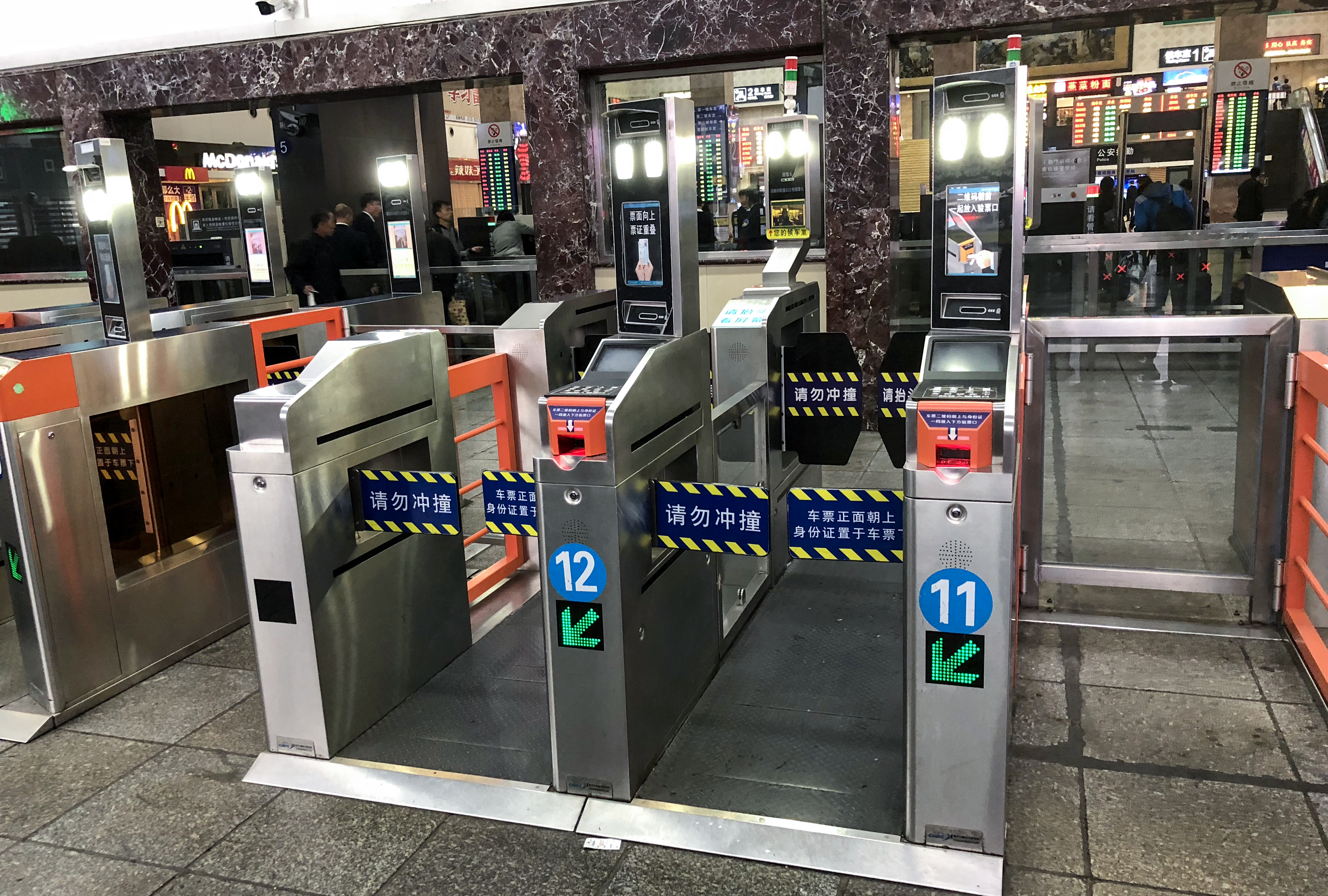
The self-service real-name verification device at the entrance of Changsha Station

China Railway Customer Service Center issued new regulations, stipulating that in order to prevent scalpers from using other people's identity information to hoard tickets online, the online ticketing system will no longer accept purchases of tickets with itinerary conflicts from December 26, 2014. Itinerary conflicts refer to tickets with the same train time, train number and identity information as recorded on the ticket. However, the railway department also stated that some passengers who need it can use different documents to go to the station ticket office to purchase different tickets for the same train in sections.

== Analysis and criticisms ==
=== Equipment upgrade issues ===
- As of January 10, 2011, many ticket acceptance points across Guangzhou had not received notification of the real-name ticket sales, and some ticket inspectors also said they had not received any requests to check passengers’ tickets and ID documents at the same time. However, the real-name system allows tickets to be purchased 10 days in advance, so some people are concerned about whether the system upgrade of more than 200 ticket acceptance points in Guangzhou will be in time.
- Regarding the issue of student ticket purchases, the regulations state that "minors over 1.5 meters tall and under 16 years old who do not have ID cards can purchase tickets with their household registration booklet, a household registration certificate issued by the public security bureau in their place of residence, or a student ID card." Therefore, what to do with students over 16 years old who do not have ID cards and are in a hurry to go out becomes a problem.

=== Practicality ===
In the Wenzhou high-speed train rear-end collision accident on July 23, 2011, the Ministry of Railways was unable to produce a complete list of passengers, and some media reported that ticket inquiries did not include ID card information verification, so the real-name system was considered to be superficial.

=== Purchasing tickets under a pseudonym ===
On January 10, 2014, a netizen used two character names from the Touhou Project and his real ID number to successfully purchase two round-trip train tickets from Fuzhou to Fuzhou South on the 12306 online ticket booking website in order to verify the identity authentication loophole. He also successfully picked up the tickets manually and live-streamed his successful entry, boarding, ticket verification with the train service, and exiting the gate on Weibo. The reason is that the ticket booking system is not connected to the public security citizen identity information system. It only verifies whether the ID number conforms to the format, but does not check whether the ID number and the corresponding information actually match. There are also reports that some scalpers took advantage of this flaw and used automatically generated fake ID numbers that conform to the format to grab tickets and hoard tickets. Later, the official website of the Ministry of Railways 12306 modified the system and connected it to the public security department's identity information system, so that fake names or ID numbers could not pass the verification.

=== English interface of self-service ticket machines ===
Since the implementation of the real-name ticketing system for all high-speed trains in mainland China on June 1, 2011, most of the self-service ticket machines in train stations have been equipped with ID card scanning devices to comply with the real-name system. Only after the purchaser's ID card is recognized can the train ticket be purchased. On January 28, 2012, the netizen "pretending to be in New York" uploaded a screenshot of the location-based social networking site Foursquare on Weibo. In the picture, a netizen claiming to be from Russia said at Beijing South Railway Station: "Since only Chinese ID cards can buy tickets at the ticket vending machine, why do they have an English interface?" Before the implementation of the real-name ticketing system, foreign passengers could buy tickets at the ticket vending machines with English interfaces without showing their ID cards; and currently only some stations have installed self-service ticket machines that can read passports and Hong Kong and Macao residents' travel permits to the mainland. Pierre, a French teacher at Zhejiang Gongshang University, also said that since an English interface has been set up, the ticket purchase needs of foreigners should be taken into consideration. Some netizens also suggested that a smart chip could be added to the Chinese visas issued to foreigners, so that the problem could be solved by directly reading the Chinese visa when using the ticket vending machine.

On August 6, 2014, the Beijing News published a commentary titled "Foreigners can't use it, so why do ticket vending machines have English?" The commentary said that some netizens ridiculed the controversy by saying, "It's to make it easier for Chinese people to practice English while buying tickets. Do you understand the good intentions behind this?"

=== Operational philosophy ===
Huatie Trading Co., Ltd., the contractor of some station shops under the Shanghai Railway Administration, published an article on its official website stating that "after the 'high-speed rail tragedy' in China in 2011, the concept of passenger station construction and operation has returned from 'serving passengers' to the 'passenger management' model of traditional stations." The Beijing South Railway Station, built in 2008, allows users to enter the station through security checks without holding tickets, and to board trains, drop off passengers, and shop. This is a revolution for traditional stations. However, after the implementation of the comprehensive real-name system at the entrance, passengers who drop off passengers cannot enter the waiting hall, which reduces the flow of people in the waiting room shops. Some employees working in the shops even have to buy short-distance tickets in order to enter the shops in the inspection area. The article believes that if high-speed rail stations implement open management, the annual turnover of their shops will increase by at least 15%.

=== Minimum transfer time limit ===
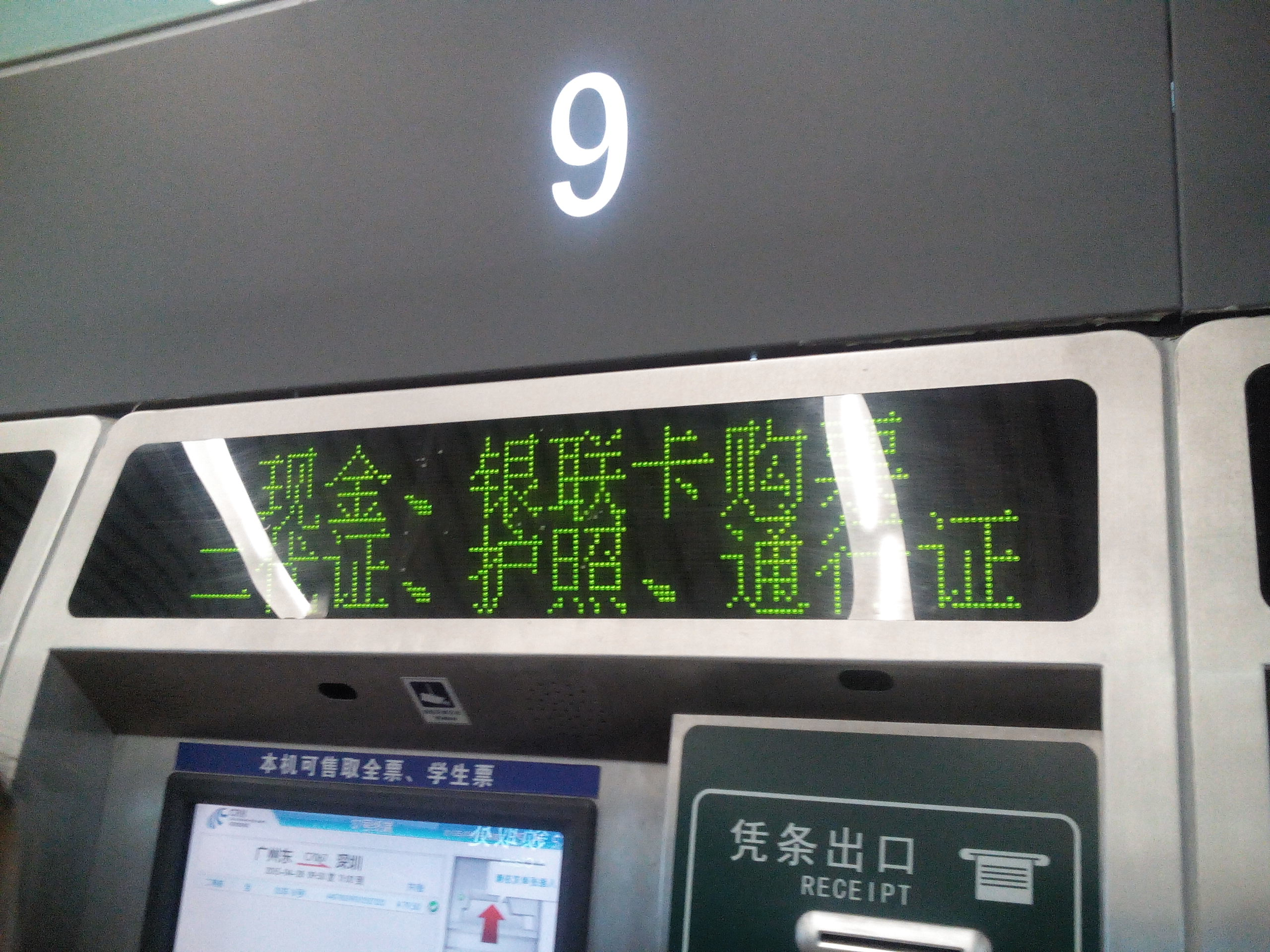
The ticket vending and collection machine for Guangzhou- Shenzhen EMU trains located in Guangzhou East Station is one of the earliest real-name ticket machines in the Chinese railway system to support the use of passports and Mainland Travel Permits for Hong Kong and Macao Residents.

On September 21, 2018, China Railway Corporation suddenly implemented a minimum transfer time limit without prior notice: the two tickets purchased by passengers must be at least 40 minutes apart, otherwise the ticket will fail to be issued. As it was the Mid-Autumn Festival holiday and there was no prior notice, some passengers expressed dissatisfaction with the new regulations and said that this move had seriously affected their travel. Modern Express believed that this move made the transfer channels at some stations useless. At around 22:00 that evening, 12306 changed the minimum transfer time limit for most stations from the original 40 minutes to 10 minutes, but some stations still seemed to have a 40-minute or even 45-minute interval limit. On September 22, China Railway Corporation changed the limit interval for transfer tickets at the same station to more than 10 minutes, and the interval between two tickets for transfers at different stations must be more than 40 minutes.
