= China Railway Shanghai Group =

Chinese railway operator

China Railway Shanghai Group Co., Ltd.
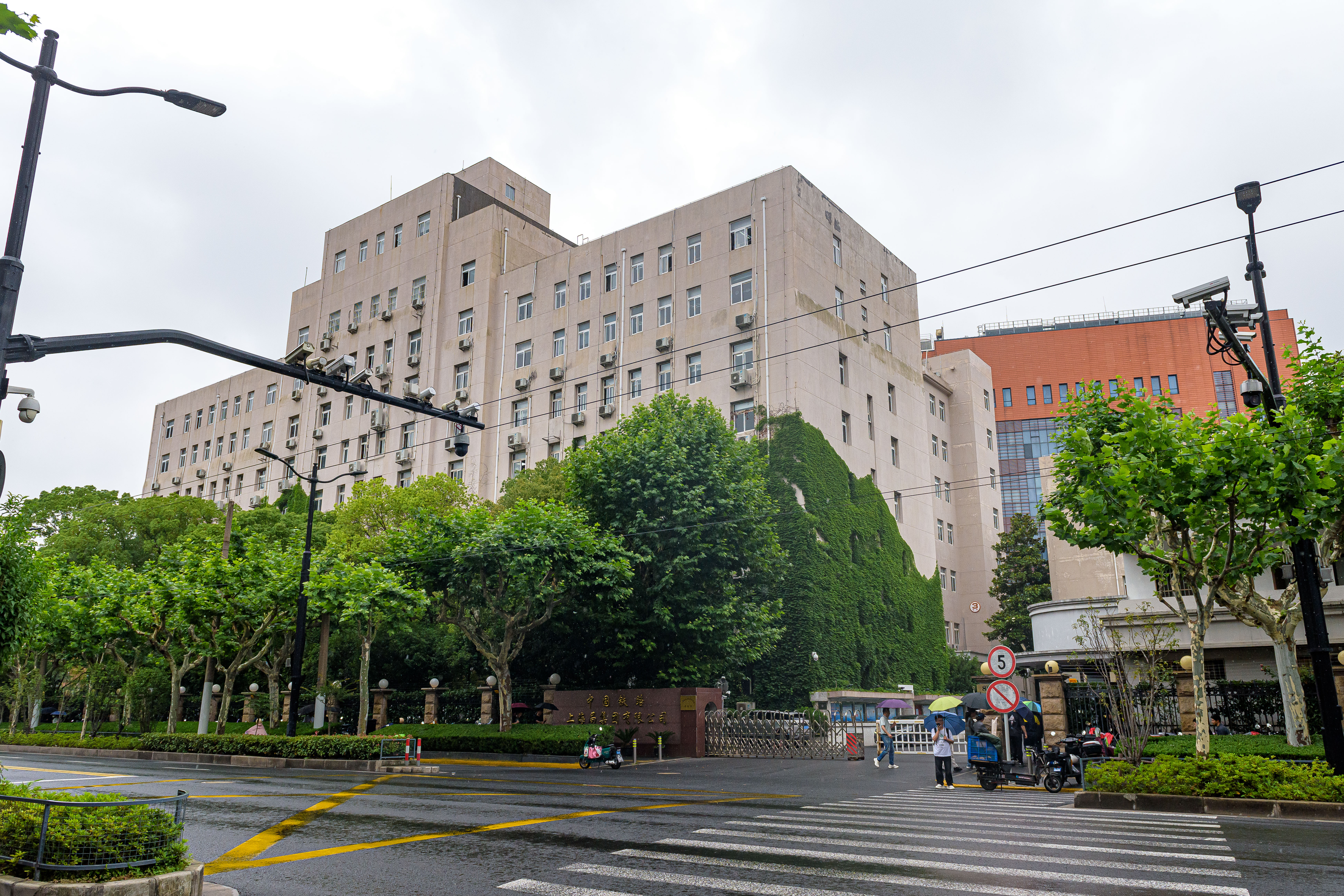
- Headquarters building designed by Doon Dayu in 1936
- Company type: State-owned enterprise
- Industry: Railway operations
- Predecessor: Shanghai Railway Administration
- Founded: 19 November 2017
- Headquarters: 80 Tianmu E Road, Jing'an, Shanghai, China
- Area served: Shanghai; Jiangsu; Anhui; Zhejiang
- Owner: Government of China
- Parent: China Railway
- Website: www.railshj.cn

China Railway Shanghai Group
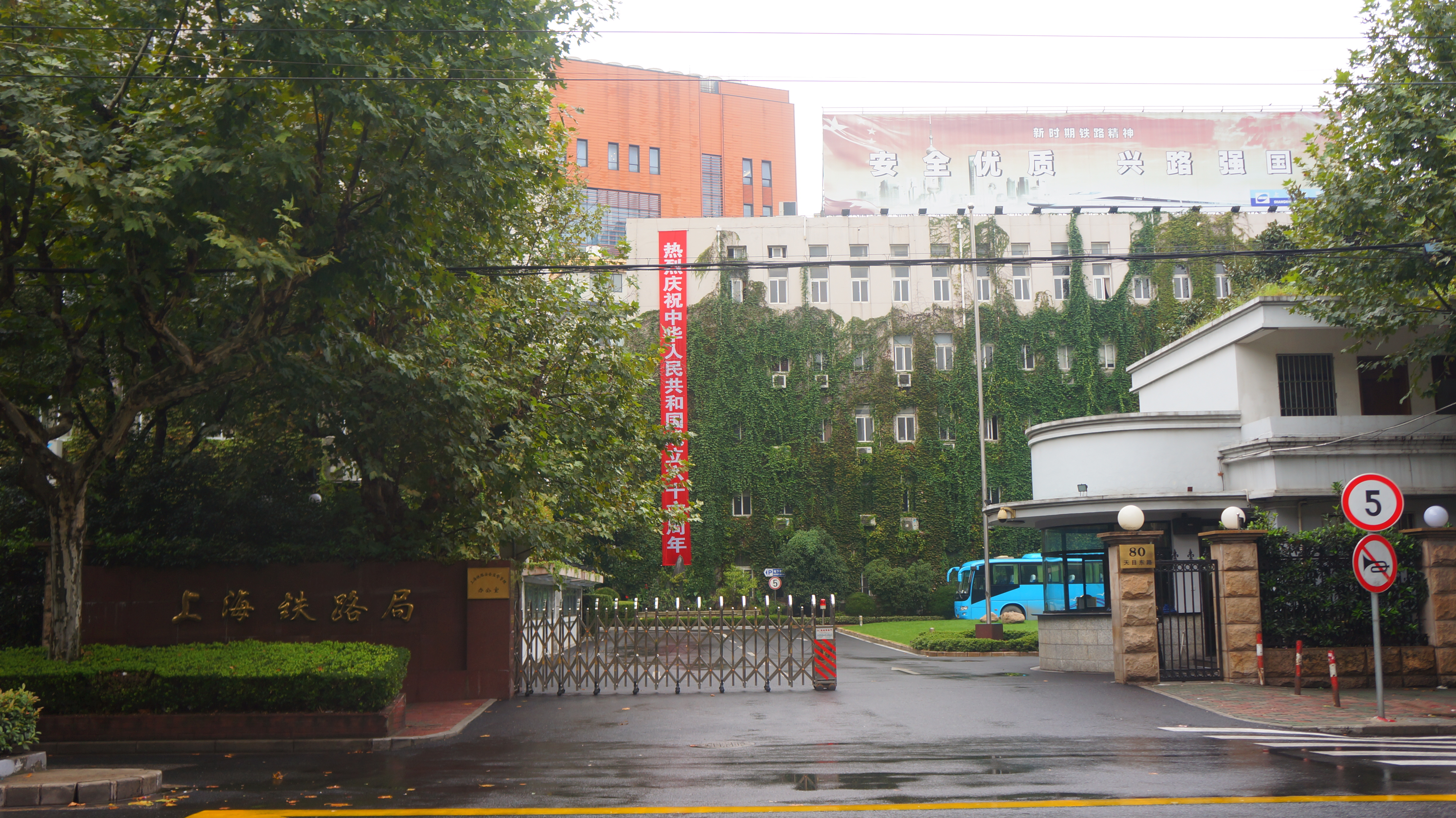
- Simplified Chinese: 中国铁路上海局集团
- Traditional Chinese: 中國鐵路上海局集團
Transcriptions
Standard Mandarin
- Hanyu Pinyin: Zhōngguó Tiělù Shànghǎi Jú Jítuán

Shanghai Railway Administration
- Simplified Chinese: 上海铁路局
- Traditional Chinese: 上海鐵路局
Transcriptions
Standard Mandarin
- Hanyu Pinyin: Shànghǎi Tiělù Jú

CR Shanghai
- Simplified Chinese: 上铁
- Traditional Chinese: 上鐵
Transcriptions
Standard Mandarin
- Hanyu Pinyin: Shàngtiě

China Railway Shanghai Group, officially abbreviated as CR Shanghai or CR-Shanghai, formerly, Shanghai Railway Administration is a group subsidiary under the umbrella of the China Railway Group (formerly the Ministry of Railways). The railway administration was restructured as a company in November 2017.

As of 2007, it was in charge of a total length of 10,810.5 kilometers, and a commercial length of 4,928 kilometers of railways. It oversees 503 stations and manages the railways in Shanghai, Jiangsu, Anhui and Zhejiang provinces.

Shanghai Railway Bureau estimated that by 2010 its commercial length of railways will be more than 7,060 km, including over 1,500 km of the inter-city railway.

== Hub stations ==
- Shanghai
  - Shanghai, Shanghai South, Shanghai Hongqiao, Shanghai Songjiang
- Nanjing
  - Nanjing, Nanjing South
- Hangzhou
  - Hangzhou, Hangzhou East, Hangzhou South
- Hefei
  - Hefei, Hefei South
- Changzhou
  - Changzhou
- Wuxi
  - Wuxi, Wuxi East
- Suzhou
  - Suzhou, Suzhou North

== Regional services ==
=== S-train services ===
- Ningbo Suburban Railway
  - Yongyu (S1)
- Shaoxing Suburban Railway
  - Shaoxing Tourism New Transit
- Lianyungang Suburban Railway
  - Lianyungang Suburban
- Shanghai
  - Jinshan

=== Other services ===
- Pudong
