= Yaqian station (Shaoxing Metro) =

Metro station in China

Yaqian 衙前
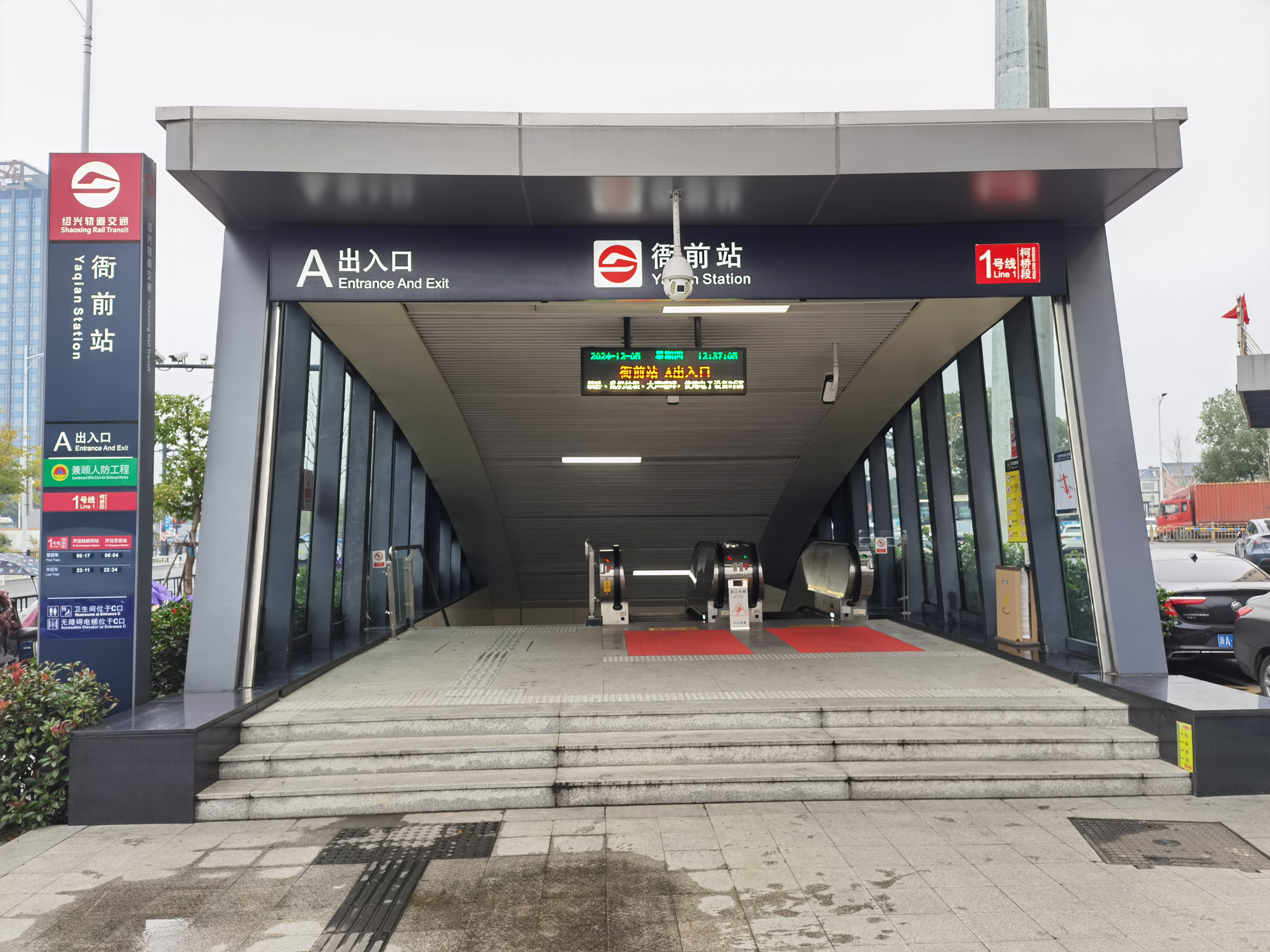
- Entrance A

General information
- Location: Zhangxia Road × Yaqian Road; Xiaoshan District, Hangzhou, Zhejiang; China
- Coordinates: 30.16556°N 120.35543°E
- System: Shaoxing metro station
- Operator: Shaoxing Jingyue Metro Corporation
- Line: Line 1
- Platforms: 2 (1 island platform)

Construction
- Structure type: Underground
- Accessible: Yes

History
- Opened: June 28, 2021

Services
Preceding station	Shaoxing Metro	Following station
Guniangqiao Terminus	Line 1	Yangxunqiao towards Fangquan
Location

Yaqian (Chinese: 衙前) is a metro station on Line 1 of the Shaoxing Metro, located in the Xiaoshan District of Hangzhou.

== Station layout ==
Yaqian has two levels: a concourse, and an island platform with two tracks for line 1.

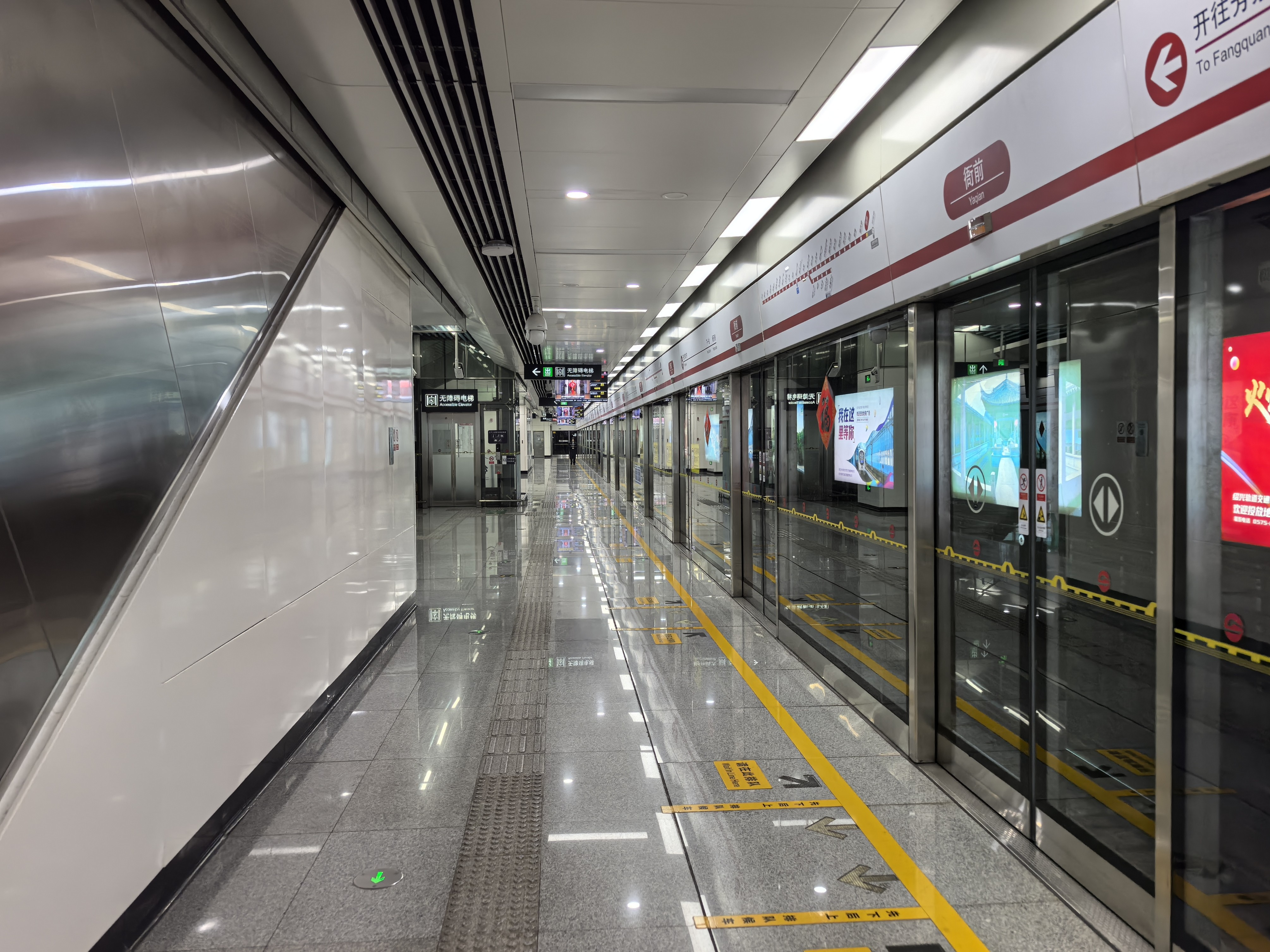
Platforms

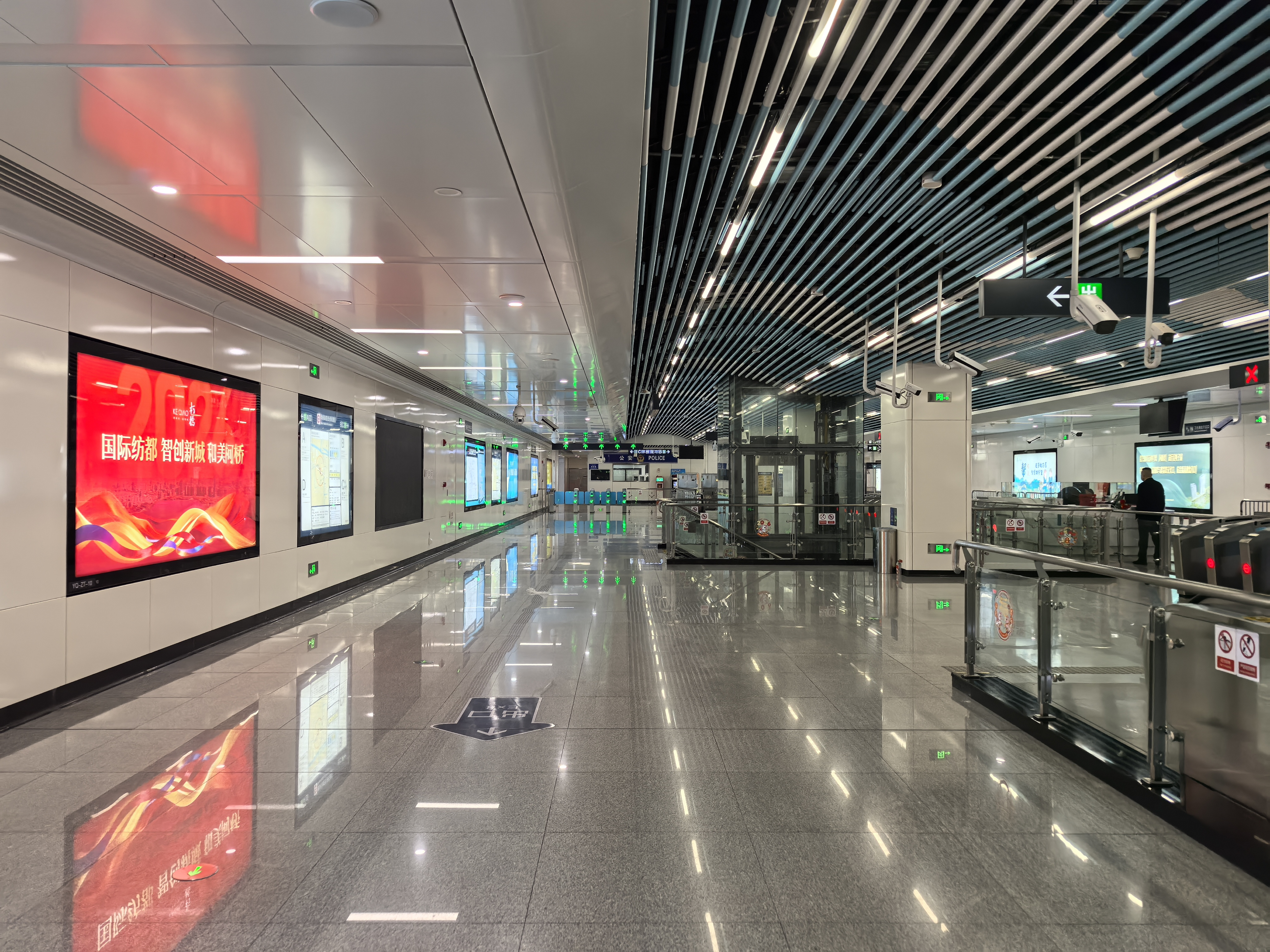
Concourse

== Entrances/exits ==
- A: east side of Zhangxia Road, south side of Yaqian Road
- B: east side of Zhangxia Road, north side of Yaqian Road
- C: west side of Zhangxia Road, north side of Yaqian Road
- D: west side of Zhangxia Road, south side of Yaqian Road
