= Meishan Square station =

Metro station in Shaoxing, China

Meishan Square 梅山广场
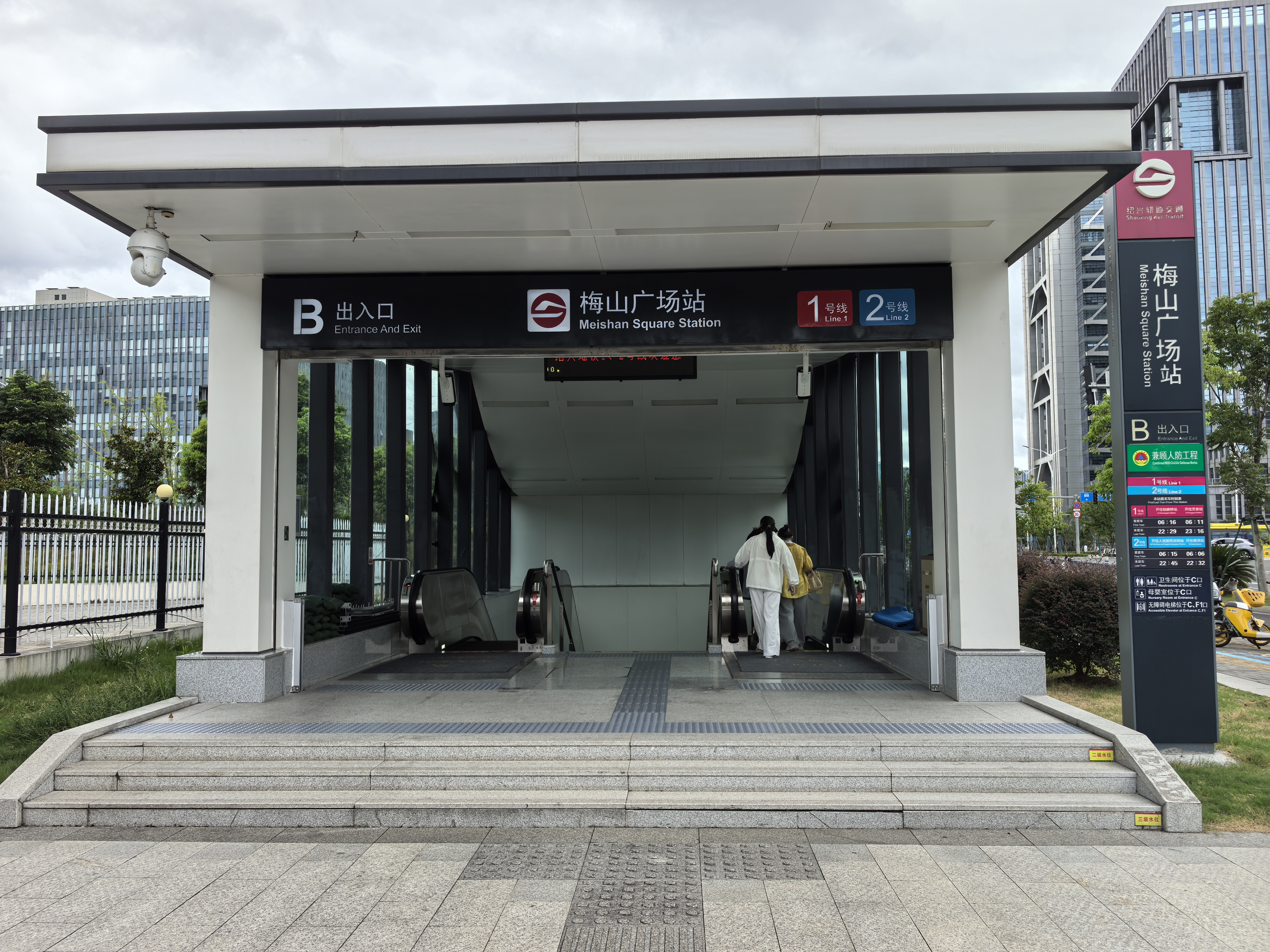
- Entrance B

General information
- Location: Jiefang Avenue × Yangjiang West Road; Yuecheng District, Shaoxing, Zhejiang; China
- Coordinates: 30.05262°N 120.57259°E
- System: Shaoxing metro station
- Operator: Shaoxing Jingyue Metro Corporation
- Lines: Line 1; Line 2
- Platforms: 4 (2 island platform)

Construction
- Structure type: Underground
- Accessible: Yes

History
- Opened: 29 April 2022; 4 years ago (Line 1); 26 July 2023; 3 years ago (Line 2)

Services
Preceding station	Shaoxing Metro	Following station
Olympic Sports Center towards Guniangqiao	Line 1	Fenglin towards Fangquan
The General People's Hospital Terminus	Line 2	Houshu Road towards Tandu
Location

Meishan Square (simplified Chinese: 梅山广场; traditional Chinese: 梅山廣場) is a metro station on Line 1 and Line 2 of the Shaoxing Metro, located in the Yuecheng District of Shaoxing.

== Station layout ==
Meishan Square has three levels: a concourse, and separate levels for lines 1 and 2. Each of these consists of an island platform with two tracks.

== Entrances/exits ==
- A1: Jiefang Ave. (E), Shaoxing Rail Transit
- A2: Jiefang Ave. (E), Meishan Square
- B: Jiefang Ave.(W), Yangjiang West Rd.(N), Shaoxing Olympic Sports Center Natatorium
- C: Jiefang Ave.(W), Yangjiang West Rd.(S), Jiayuan Square
- D1 & D2: Jiayuan Square
- D3: Jiefang Ave. (E), Shulan Rd.
- E: Jiefang Ave. (E)
- F1: Yangjiang West Rd.(N), Shaoxing Municipal People's Government
- F2: Yangjiang West Rd.(N), Meishan Square
- G1 & G2: Jiefang Ave.(E), Yangjiang West Rd.(S), Xintiandi Business Square
- G3: Yangjiang West Rd.(S), Xintiandi Business Square
