= Shaoxing Urban Rail Line =

Railway line in Zhejiang, China

Shaoxing Urban Rail Line (Line S1)
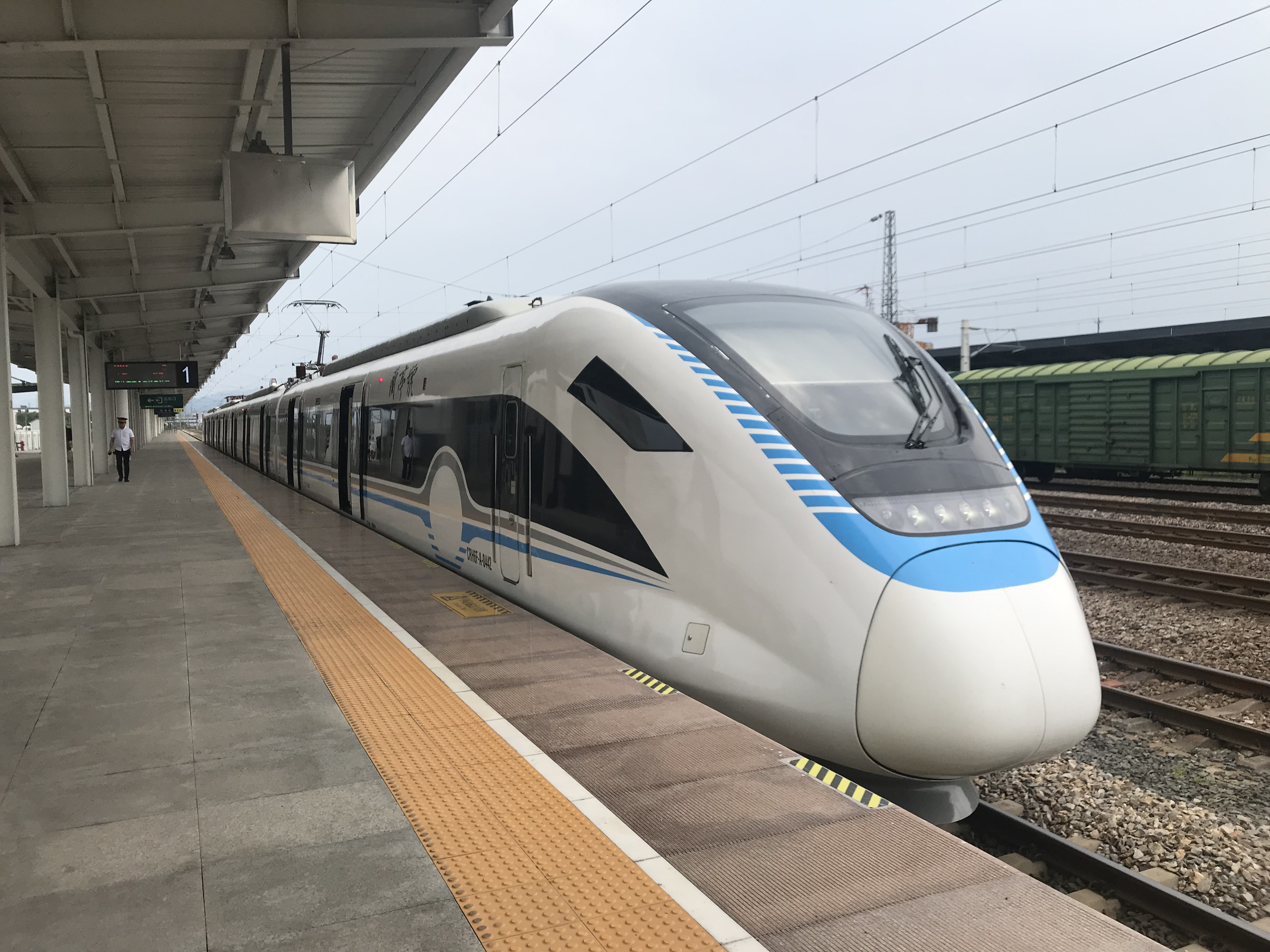

Overview
- Service type: Commuter rail, Intercity rail
- Status: Operational
- Locale: Shaoxing and Hangzhou, Zhejiang province, China
- First service: 18 April 2018; 6 years ago
- Current operator(s): Shaoxing Rail Transit, China Railway Shanghai Group
- Ridership: 4,000 (April 19, 2018)

Route
- Termini: Hangzhou South; Shangyu
- Stops: Qianqing, Shaoxing
- Distance travelled: 80.2 km (50 mi) (147.3km through service to Ningbo)
- Line(s) used: Xiaoshan–Ningbo railway

Technical
- Rolling stock: CRH6F-A
- Track gauge: 1,435 mm (4 ft 8 1/2 in)
- Operating speed: 120 km/h
- Track owner(s): China Railway Shanghai Group
- Rake maintenance: Shaoxing

Shaoxing Urban Rail Line (Chinese: 绍兴城际线), also known as Shaoxing Tourism New Transit railway (Chinese: 绍兴风情旅游新干线) or Line S1, is a commuter rail service. It runs from Hangzhou South railway station in Xiaoshan District, Hangzhou to Shangyu railway station in Shangyu District, Shaoxing on the existing Xiaoshan–Ningbo railway. There are also through operation to Ningbo–Yuyao intercity railway.

== Fare ==
The fare is 6 yuan for Qianqing to Shaoxing, 12 yuan for Shangyu and 8 yuan for Shaoxing to Shangyu.

Fares can be paid with a QR code in Weixin Pay or Alipay. Passengers can also purchase single-ride tickets offline at ticket counters or machines at some stations, but they cannot purchase these tickets online. These tickets come in the form of a plastic RFID-enabled card. These cards are to be tapped on the faregates at the start of a journey and are to be inserted into the faregates at the exit to be collected and reused. The ticket cards cannot be taken home after the completion of a trip, but a paper reimbursement receipt can be obtained just before exiting the station and taken home for reimbursement purposes.

When departing from Hangzhou South railway station, identity information may be required for some trains. In these cases, a seat number will also be assigned.

== Stations ==

Station №	Station name		Connections	Distance km		Location	Section
Station №	English	Chinese	Connections	Distance km		Location	Section
XHH	Hangzhou South	杭州南	Hangzhou Metro: 5	0	0	Xiaoshan (Hangzhou)	Xiaoyong railway
QQH	Qianqing	钱清	Shaoxing Metro: 1	28.6	28.6	Keqiao	Xiaoyong railway
	Xinggonglu	兴工路				Keqiao	Xiaoyong railway
	Jinkeqiaodadao	金柯桥大道				Keqiao	Xiaoyong railway
	Jingshuilu	镜水路				Keqiao	Xiaoyong railway
SOH	Shaoxing	绍兴	Shaoxing Metro: 1	20.2	48.8	Yuecheng	Xiaoyong railway
	Didang	迪荡				Yuecheng	Xiaoyong railway
	Gaobu	皋埠				Yuecheng	Xiaoyong railway
	Taoyan	陶堰				Yuecheng	Xiaoyong railway
	Dongguanzhen	东关镇				Shangyu	Xiaoyong railway
BDH	Shangyu	上虞		31.4	80.2	Shangyu	Xiaoyong railway
	Baiguan	百官				Shangyu	Xiaoyong railway
	Yiting	驿亭				Shangyu	Xiaoyong railway
Through operation to Ningbo-Yuyao intercity railway (19km to Yuyao)

== History ==
Between 18 April 2018 and 29 September 2018, the train does not stop at any station except Shaoxing and Shangyu stations. On 29 September 2018, a third station Qianqing was open for operation and extending the line with an additional 20 km. On 1 July 2020, the line extended to Hangzhou South. On 30 December 2022, Didang railway station opened.
