= Line 2 (Shaoxing Metro) =

Metro line in Shaoxing, China

- 2
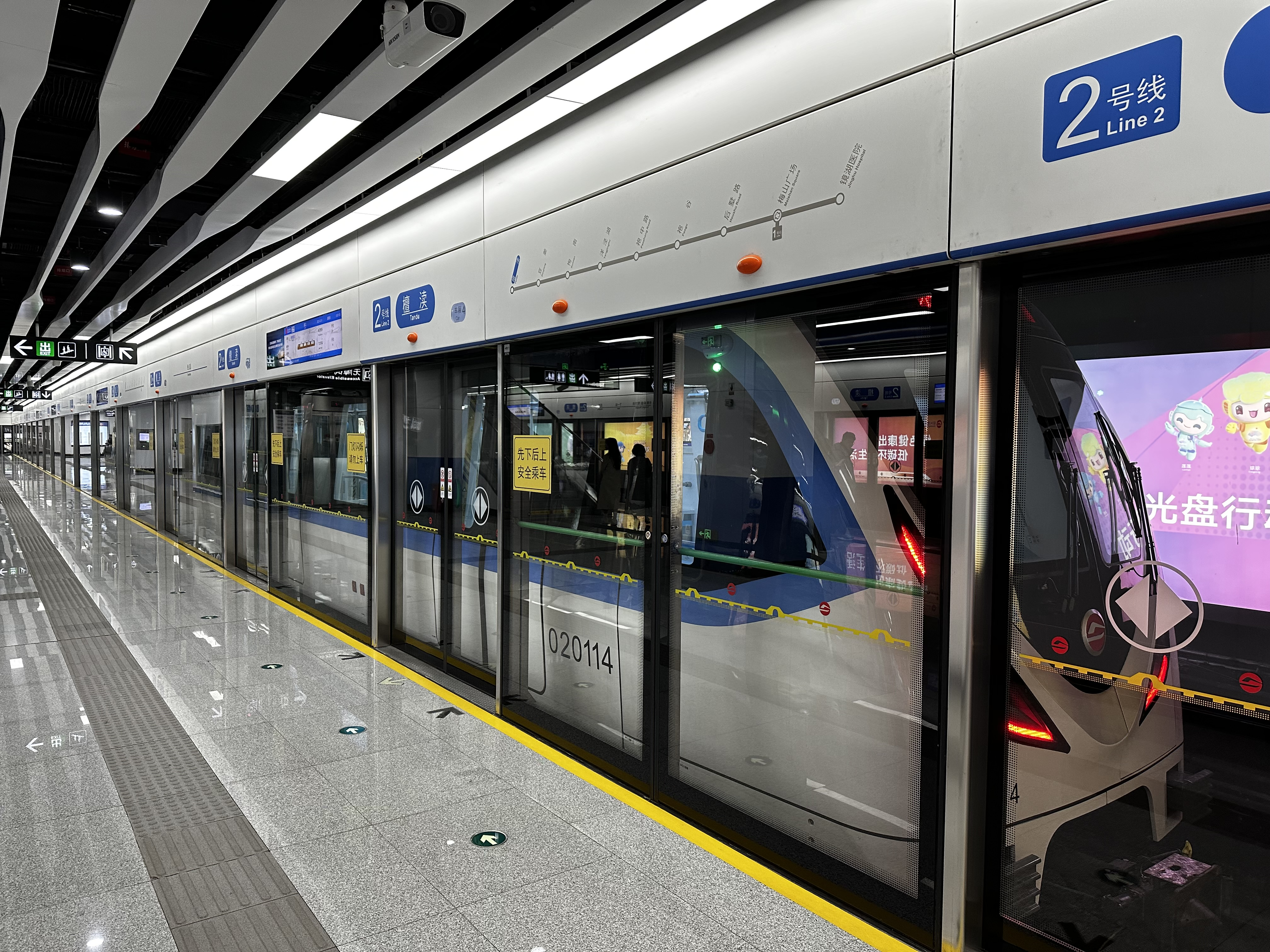
- Line 2 train at Tandu station

Overview
- Status: Operational
- Locale: Shaoxing, Zhejiang, China
- Termini: Jinghu Hospital; Tandu
- Stations: 9

Service
- Type: Rapid transit
- System: Shaoxing Metro
- Operator(s): Shaoxing Metro Corporation
- Rolling stock: PM201

History
- Opened: 26 July 2023; 2 years ago

Technical
- Line length: 10.55 km (6.56 mi)
- Character: Underground
- Track gauge: 1,435 mm (4 ft 8 1/2 in)
- Operating speed: 100 km/h (62 mph)

Line 2 of Shaoxing Metro (Chinese: 绍兴轨道交通2号线) is a metro line in Shaoxing, Zhejiang Province, China. The line runs in the main urban area, with a total length of 10.55 kilometers and 9 stations.

Line 2 was approved by the State Council in mid-2016 with the first round of the Shaoxing Metro construction plan. Construction started on 1 March 2020, and the line was officially opened for operation on 26 July 2023. The line uses 4-car trains initially and would have mixed operations of 4 and 6-car trains in the long term.

== Opening timeline ==
Segment	Commencement	Length	Station(s)
Jinghu Hospital — Tandu	26 July 2023	10.55 km (6.56 mi)	9

== Stations ==
Station Name		Connections	Distance km	Location
English	Chinese	Connections	Distance km	Location
The General People's Hospital (Note: Was Jinghu Hospital until 28 February 2024)	人民医院总院			Yuecheng
Meishan Square	梅山广场	1		Yuecheng
Houshu Road	后墅路			Yuecheng
Paogu	袍谷			Yuecheng
Paozhong Road	袍中路			Yuecheng
Yangjinghu	洋泾湖			Yuecheng
Xunnan	恂南	3		Yuecheng
Doujiang	豆姜			Yuecheng
Tandu	檀渎			Yuecheng

== Rolling stock ==
Stock	Class	Year built	Builder	Number built	Numbers	Formation	Depots	Line assigned	Notes
PM201	B	2022–2023	CRRC Nanjing Puzhen	44 (11 sets)	02 001 - 02 011 (020011–020114)	TMc+Mp+Mp+TMc	Doujiang Sidings	2	
PMAK2	B	2025	CRRC Nanjing Puzhen	40 (10 sets)	02 012 - 02 021 (020121–020214)	TMc+Mp+Mp+TMc	Doujiang Sidings	2	Under construction.
