= Line 1 (Shaoxing Metro) =

Metro line in Shaoxing, China

- 1
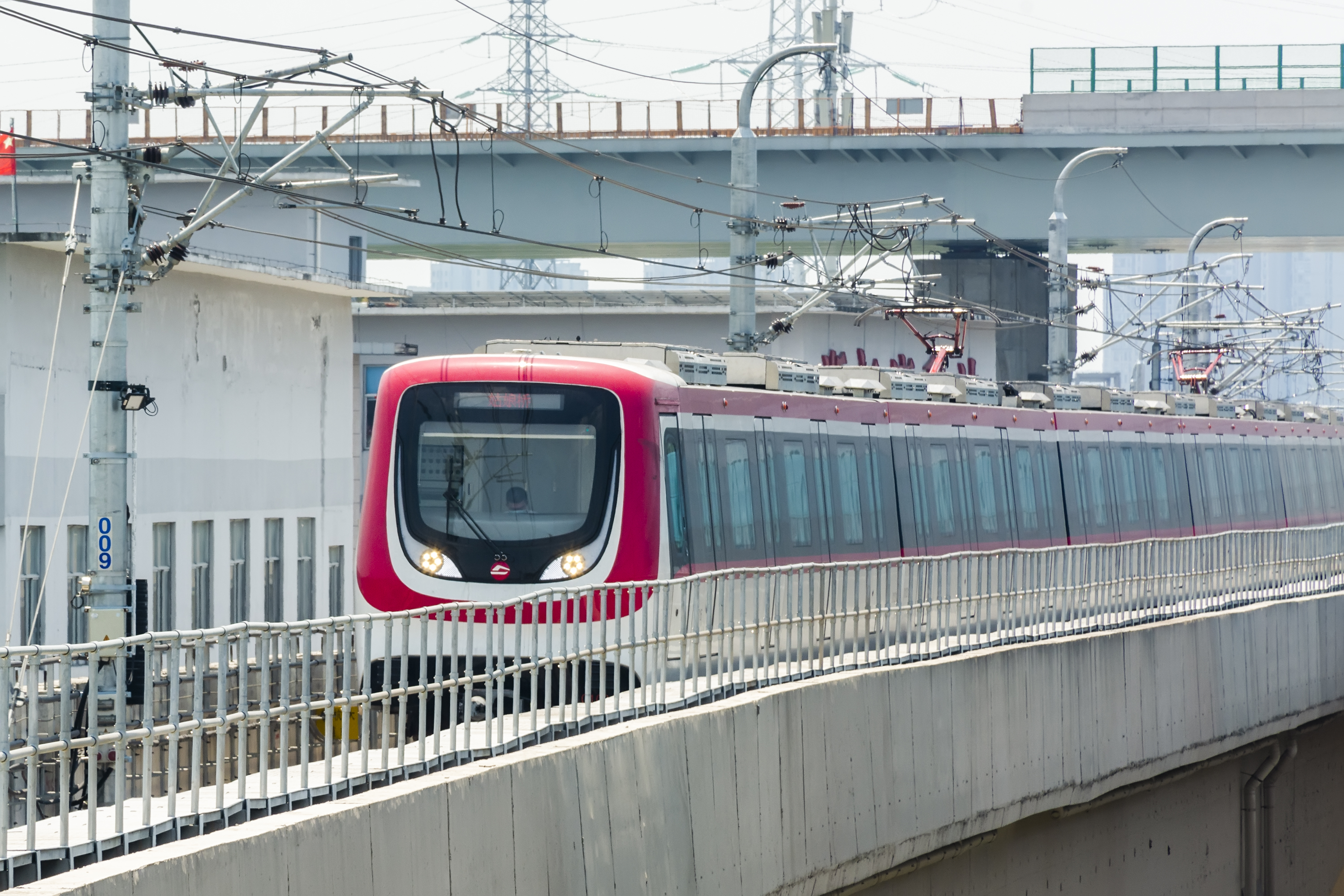
- Line 1 train

Overview
- Status: Operational
- Locale: Shaoxing, Zhejiang Province, China
- Termini: Guniangqiao; Fangquan Daqingsi
- Stations: 28 (main line); 3 (branch, 5 in 2025)

Service
- Type: Rapid transit
- System: Shaoxing Metro
- Operator(s): Shaoxing Jingyue Metro Co., Ltd.
- Rolling stock: PM139; ZBM02

History
- Opened: 28 June 2021; 5 years ago

Technical
- Line length: 47.1 km (Main line, in operation); 7.3 km (Branch, 4.08 km opening in 2024)
- Character: Underground and elevated
- Operating speed: 80km/h

Line 1 of Shaoxing Metro (Chinese: 绍兴轨道交通1号线; pinyin: Shàoxīng Guǐdào Jiāotōng Yīhào Xiàn) is a metro line in Shaoxing, Zhejiang Province, China.

Line 1 is operated by Shaoxing Jingyue Metro Co., Ltd. under PPP Contract, a joinly between Shaoxing Metro Rail Transit Group Co., Ltd. (which holds 49%) and other entities.

== Section ==
Main line (Keqiao section)

The section from Guniangqiao to China Textile City opened on 28 June 2021. The section is 20.3 km (12.6 mi) in length with 10 stations. Elevated section from Yangxunqiao to Linhang Avenues.

Average speed through the trip: 38.3 km/h

Main line (remaining section)

The section from China Textile City to Fangquan is 26.8 km (16.7 mi) long and runs between China Textile City station in Keqiao District and Fangquan station in Yuecheng District, passing through the city center of Shaoxing with 18 stations. The section opened on 29 April 2022.

Branch line (future Line 4)

The branch line will branch off at Huangjiu Town and head north for 7.3 km (4.5 mi) to Exhibition and Convention Center with 6 stations (5 new stations, Huangjiu Town station is already opened with the main line of Line 1). The initial section opened on 1 April 2024 and the remaining section will open on 30 June 2025. The branch line will be part of Line 4 in the future.

== Opening timeline ==
Segment	Commencement	Length	Station(s)	Name
Guniangqiao — China Textile City	28 June 2021	20.3 km (12.6 mi)	10	Main line (Keqiao section)
China Textile City — Fangquan	29 April 2022	26.8 km (16.7 mi)	18	Main line (remaining section)
Huangjiu Town — Daqingsi	1 April 2024	4.08 km (2.5 mi)	3	Branch line (initial section)
Daqingsi — Exhibition And Convention Center	30 June 2025	3.22 km (2.0 mi)	2	Branch line (remaining section)

== Stations ==
=== Main line ===
Station Name		Connections	Distance km	Location
English	Chinese	Connections	Distance km	Location
Guniangqiao	姑娘桥	5 (Hangzhou Metro)	0.13	Xiaoshan, Hangzhou
Yaqian	衙前		3.53	Xiaoshan, Hangzhou
Yangxunqiao	杨汛桥		5.75	Keqiao, Shaoxing
Qianmei	前梅		9.61	Keqiao, Shaoxing
Qianqing	钱清	Shaoxing Urban	11.30	Keqiao, Shaoxing
Xisha Road	西沙路			Keqiao, Shaoxing
Linhang Avenue	临杭大道			Keqiao, Shaoxing
Jianshui Road	鉴水路			Keqiao, Shaoxing
Yuezhou Avenue	越州大道			Keqiao, Shaoxing
China Textile City	中国轻纺城			Keqiao, Shaoxing
Mingzhu Square	明珠广场			Keqiao, Shaoxing
Guazhuhu	瓜渚湖			Keqiao, Shaoxing
Jingshui Road	镜水路			Yuecheng, Shaoxing
Huangjiu Town	黄酒小镇	1 (branch)		Yuecheng, Shaoxing
Zhangshu (Note: Zhangshu station is under construction.)	张墅			Yuecheng, Shaoxing
Olympic Sports Center	奥体中心			Yuecheng, Shaoxing
Meishan Square	梅山广场	2		Yuecheng, Shaoxing
Fenglin	凤林			Yuecheng, Shaoxing
Datan	大滩			Yuecheng, Shaoxing
Railway Station	火车站	Shaoxing Urban		Yuecheng, Shaoxing
City Square	城市广场			Yuecheng, Shaoxing
Lu Xun Native Place	鲁迅故里			Yuecheng, Shaoxing
Chengnan Avenue	城南大道			Yuecheng, Shaoxing
Fenghuangshan	凤凰山			Yuecheng, Shaoxing
Laojiafeng	劳家葑			Yuecheng, Shaoxing
Nanchi	南池			Yuecheng, Shaoxing
Qihu	栖湖			Yuecheng, Shaoxing
Fangquan	芳泉			Yuecheng, Shaoxing

=== Branch line ===
Station Name		Connections	Distance km	Location
English	Chinese	Connections	Distance km	Location
Huangjiu Town	黄酒小镇	1 (main line)		Yuecheng
Shaoxing No.1 High School	绍兴一中			Yuecheng
Huxi	湖西			Yuecheng
Daqingsi	大庆寺			Yuecheng
Shaoxing North Railway Station	绍兴北站			Yuecheng
Convention and Exhibition Center	会展中心			Keqiao

== Rolling stock ==
Stock	Class	Year built	Builder	Number built	Numbers	Formation	Depots	Line assigned	Notes
PM139	B	2020–2021	CRRC Nanjing Puzhen	108 (18 sets)	01 001 - 01 019 (010011–010196)	Tc+Mp+M+M+Mp+Tc	Wanxiu Road Depot; Jianhu Yard	1	
ZBM02	B	2020–2022	Beijing Subway Rolling Stock Equipment	162 (27 sets)	01 020 - 01 046 (010201–010466)	Tc+Mp+M+M+Mp+Tc	Wanxiu Road Depot; Jianhu Yard	1	
