= Didang railway station =

Railway station in Shaoxing, Zhejiang

Didang 迪荡
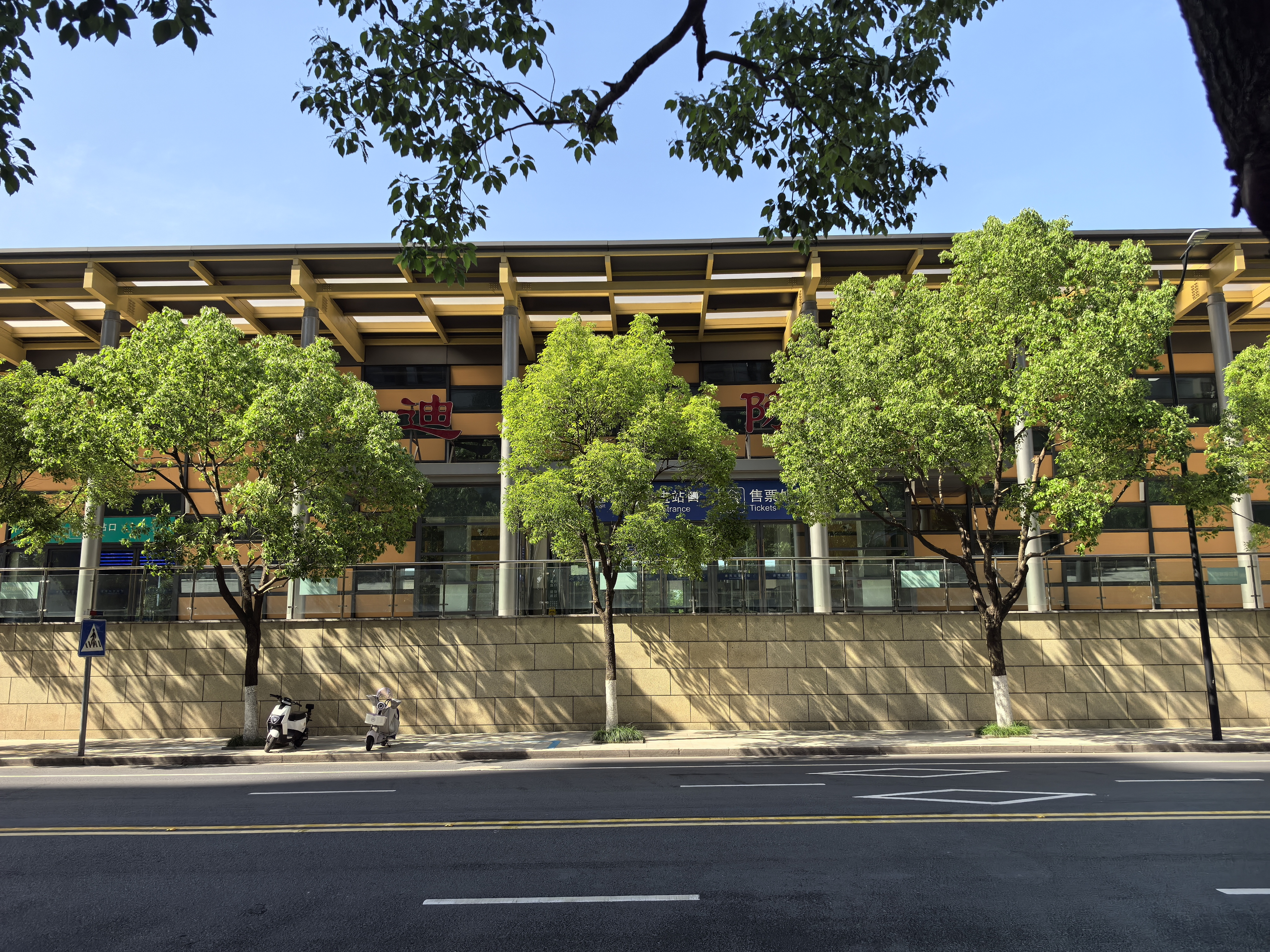

General information
- Location: Didang Subdistrict, Yuecheng District, Shaoxing, Zhejiang; China
- Coordinates: 30°0′31.77″N 120°36′45.38″E
- Line: Xiaoshan–Ningbo railway
- Platforms: 2

History
- Opened: 30 December 2022
Location

Didang railway station (Chinese: 迪荡站; pinyin: Dídàng zhàn) is a railway station in Didang Subdistrict, Yuecheng District, Shaoxing, Zhejiang, China. It is an intermediate stop on the Xiaoshan–Ningbo railway and is served by trains on the Shaoxing Urban Rail Line service.

Construction started in late 2019. The station opened on 30 December 2022.
