= Ningbo Suburban Railway =

Chinese commuter rail service

NBIR
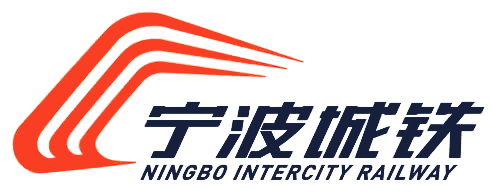

Overview
- Locale: Ningbo
- Transit type: Commuter rail

Operation
- Began operation: 6 October 2017
- Operator: CR Shanghai

NBIR
- Simplified Chinese: 宁波都市圈城际铁路
- Traditional Chinese: 寧波都市圈城際鐵路
Transcriptions
Standard Mandarin
- Hanyu Pinyin: Níngbō Dūshì Quān Chéngjì Tiělù

Alternative Chinese name
- Simplified Chinese: 宁波城铁
- Traditional Chinese: 寧波城鐵
Transcriptions
Standard Mandarin
- Hanyu Pinyin: Níngbō Chéngtiě

Second alternative Chinese name
- Simplified Chinese: 宁波市郊铁路
- Traditional Chinese: 寧波市郊鐵路
Transcriptions
Standard Mandarin
- Hanyu Pinyin: Níngbō Shìjiāo Tiělù

NBIR (Ningbo Intercity Railway.) also known as Ningbo Suburban Railway is a commuter rail service that connects urban Ningbo with outlying cities and counties beyond the reach of the city's Ningbo Rail Transit network. The "S"-numbered suburban rail lines are managed by the Ningbo Intercity Railway Co., Ltd., a subsidiary of CR Shanghai, part of the national railway company and partially owned by Ningbo Rail Transit Co., Ltd., the municipal company that operates the metro.

There are 1 suburban railway line currently in operation: Ningbo–Yuyao or Yongyu (S1).

== In operation ==
Service	Line	Service route	Opened	Length km	Routing
S1	Yongyu	Ningbo – Yuyao	6 October 2017	48.7	Xiaoyong railway

== See also ==
- Ningbo Rail Transit
