= Ningbo–Yuyao intercity railway =

Railway line in China

Ningbo–Yuyao intercity railway 宁波至余姚城际铁路
- Yongyu
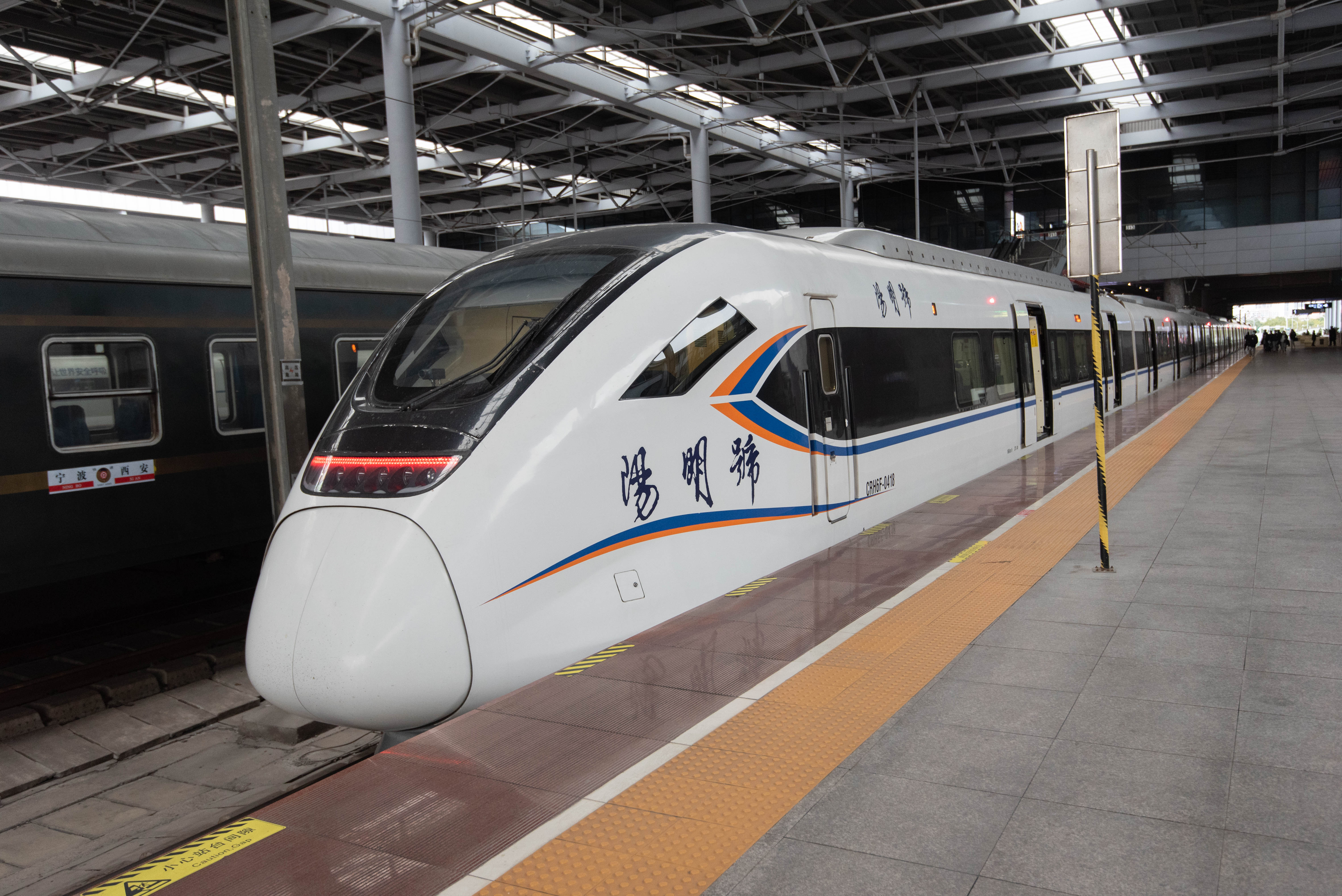
- Train in Ningbo station (阳明号)

Overview
- Service type: Commuter rail, Intercity rail
- Status: Operational
- Locale: Ningbo, Zhejiang province, China
- First service: 10 June 2017; 8 years ago
- Current operators: Ningbo Intercity Railway, CR Shanghai

Route
- Termini: Ningbo; Yuyao
- Distance travelled: 48.7 km (30.26 mi)
- Line used: Xiaoshan–Ningbo railway

Technical
- Rolling stock: CRH6F
- Track gauge: 1,435 mm (4 ft 8 1/2 in)
- Operating speed: 120km/h
- Track owner: CR Shanghai
- Rake maintenance: Yuyao

Ningbo–Yuyao intercity railway is a commuter rail service in Ningbo, Zhejiang, part of the planned Ningbo Intercity Railway network. It runs from Ningbo railway station in Haishu District to Yuyao railway station in Yuyao on the existing Xiaoshan–Ningbo railway. There are also through operation to Shaoxing Tourism New Transit railway. Passengers can transfer to Line 2 and Line 4 of Ningbo Metro at Ningbo railway station.

It is the first line to provide "Higher-speed" commuter rail services, with trains travelling up to 160 km/h (99 mph) in Ningbo and capable of transporting up to 2,000 people. By 2019, the operating speed of the line is limited to 120 km/h (75 mph).

== Stations ==
Station No.	Station name		Connections	Distance km		Location	Line
Station No.	English	Chinese	Connections	Distance km		Location	Line
Through operation to Shaoxing Tourism New Transit railway
NGH	Ningbo	宁波	2 4 Ningbo	0.00	0.00	Haishu	Xiaoyong railway
ZQH	Zhuangqiao	庄桥	4	7.37	7.37	Jiangbei	Xiaoyong railway
	Cicheng	慈城	4	12.06	19.43	Jiangbei	Xiaoyong railway
	Zhangting	丈亭				Yuyao	Xiaoyong railway
YYH	Yuyao	余姚	Yuyao	48.09		Yuyao	Xiaoyong railway

== Services ==
Eight trains per day run in each direction on the Ningbo–Yuyao Intercity Railway, 4 in the morning and 4 in the afternoon. As of December 2019, trains only serve Ningbo and Yuyao stations, with a travel time of 32 to 38 minutes. In July 2019, 3 train services in each direction started through operation with the Shaoxing Tourism New Transit railway, linking Ningbo and Yuyao with stations in Shaoxing.

=== Timetable ===
Toward Ningbo				Toward Yuyao			
Train number	Origin	Yuyao	Ningbo	Train number	Ningbo	Yuyao	Destination
S1101		06:39	07:13	S3002	08:00	08:33/35	Shaoxing 09:30
S1103		07:34	08:07	S1102	09:17	09:49	
S3001	Qianqing 07:48	08:49/51	09:24	S1104	10:06	10:39	
S1105		10:00	10:34	S3004	11:41	12:14/16	Qianqing 13:19
S3003	Qianqing 13:34	14:40/42	15:20	S1106	14:56	15:29	
S1107		14:04	14:41	S3006	16:03	16:35/37	Qianqing 17:38
S1109		16:21	16:56	S1108	17:30	18:02	
S3005	Qianqing 16:25	17:26/28	18:02	S1110	18:41	19:13	
