= Shaoxing Metro =

Urban rail transit system in Shaoxing, China

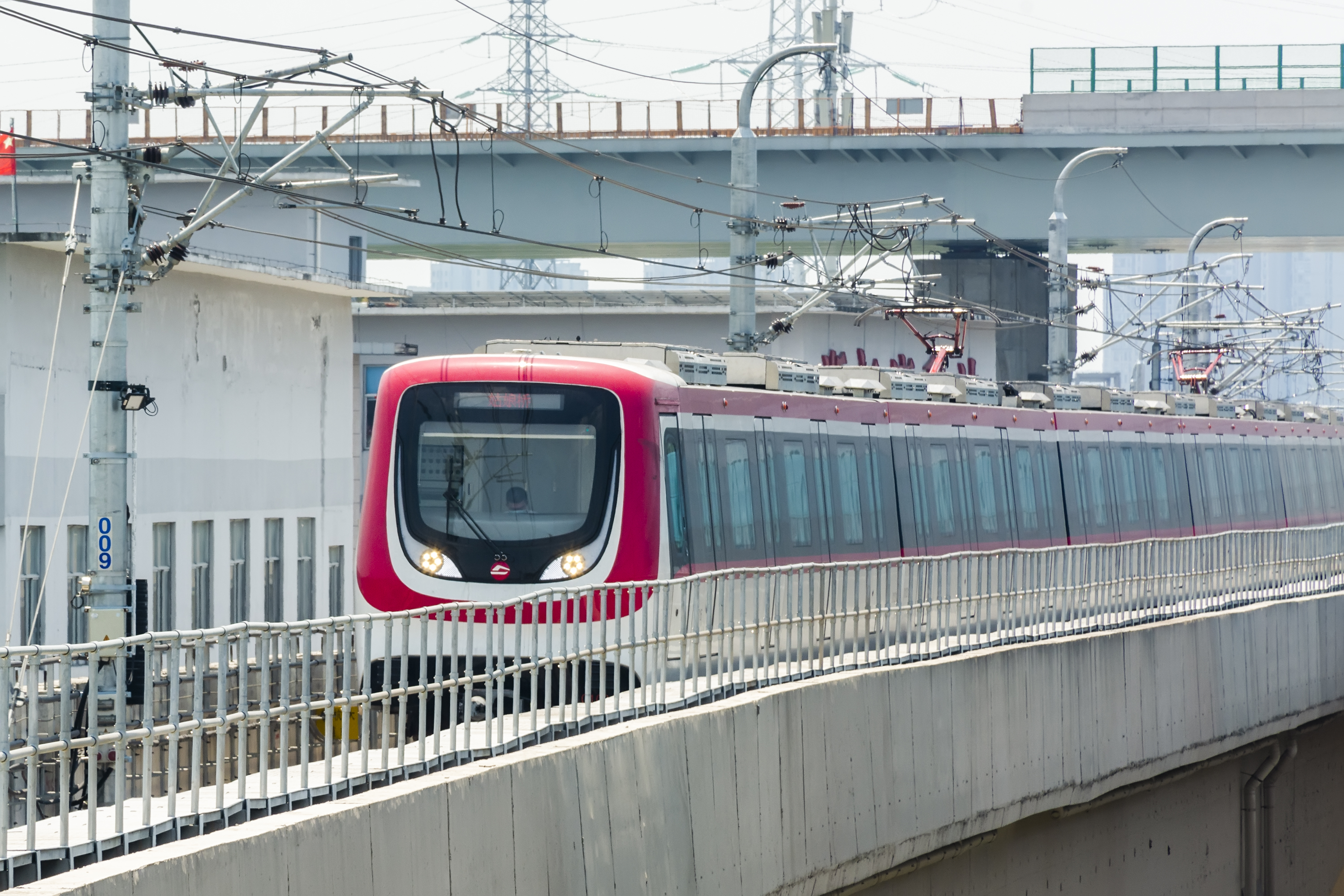
- A Line 1 train

Overview
- Locale: Shaoxing, Zhejiang Province, China
- Transit type: Rapid transit
- Number of lines: 2
- Number of stations: 42
- Daily ridership: 105,151 (ave. 2023)
- Annual ridership: 34.38 million (2023)
- Website: www.sxsmtr.cn

Operation
- Began operation: 28 June 2021; 5 years ago
- Operators: Shaoxing Jingyue Metro Co., Ltd. (Line 1 only); Shaoxing Rail Transit Group Co., Ltd.
- Number of vehicles: 38 (27 for Line 1 and 11 for Line 2)

Technical
- System length: 65.2 km (40.5 mi) (in operation)
- Track gauge: 1,435 mm (4 ft 8 1/2 in) standard gauge
- Top speed: 100 km/h
System map

Shaoxing Metro (Chinese: 绍兴轨道交通; pinyin: Shàoxīng Guǐdào Jiāotōng), also known as Shaoxing Rail Transit, is the metro system in Shaoxing, Zhejiang province, China. It operates 2 subway lines: Line 1 (including branch line) and Line 2.

== Network ==
System map for operational lines

Line	Terminals		Commencement	Newest Extension	Length km	Stations	Operator
1	Guniangqiao	Fangquan	28 June 2021	30 June 2025(Branch)	47.1	28	Shaoxing Jingyue Metro Co., Ltd.
1 Branch	Exhibition And Convention Center	Daqingsi	1 April 2024	30 June 2025	7.3	6	Shaoxing Jingyue Metro Co., Ltd.
2	Jinghu Hospital	Tandu	26 July 2023		10.73	9	Shaoxing Rail Transit Group Co., Ltd.
Total					65.2	42	

=== Line 1 ===
Line 1 began construction in 2016. The section from Guniangqiao to China Textile City opened on 28 June 2021, the remaining section from China Textile City to Fangquan opened on 29 April 2022. A branch line from Huangjiu Town to Daqingsi will opened in 2024. The extension of the branch line to Convention and Exhibition Center will open in 2025. The Line connects the Yuecheng and Keqiao districts to Hangzhou through the western terminus, Guniangqiao, as it is also the eastern terminus of Hangzhou Metro Line 5.

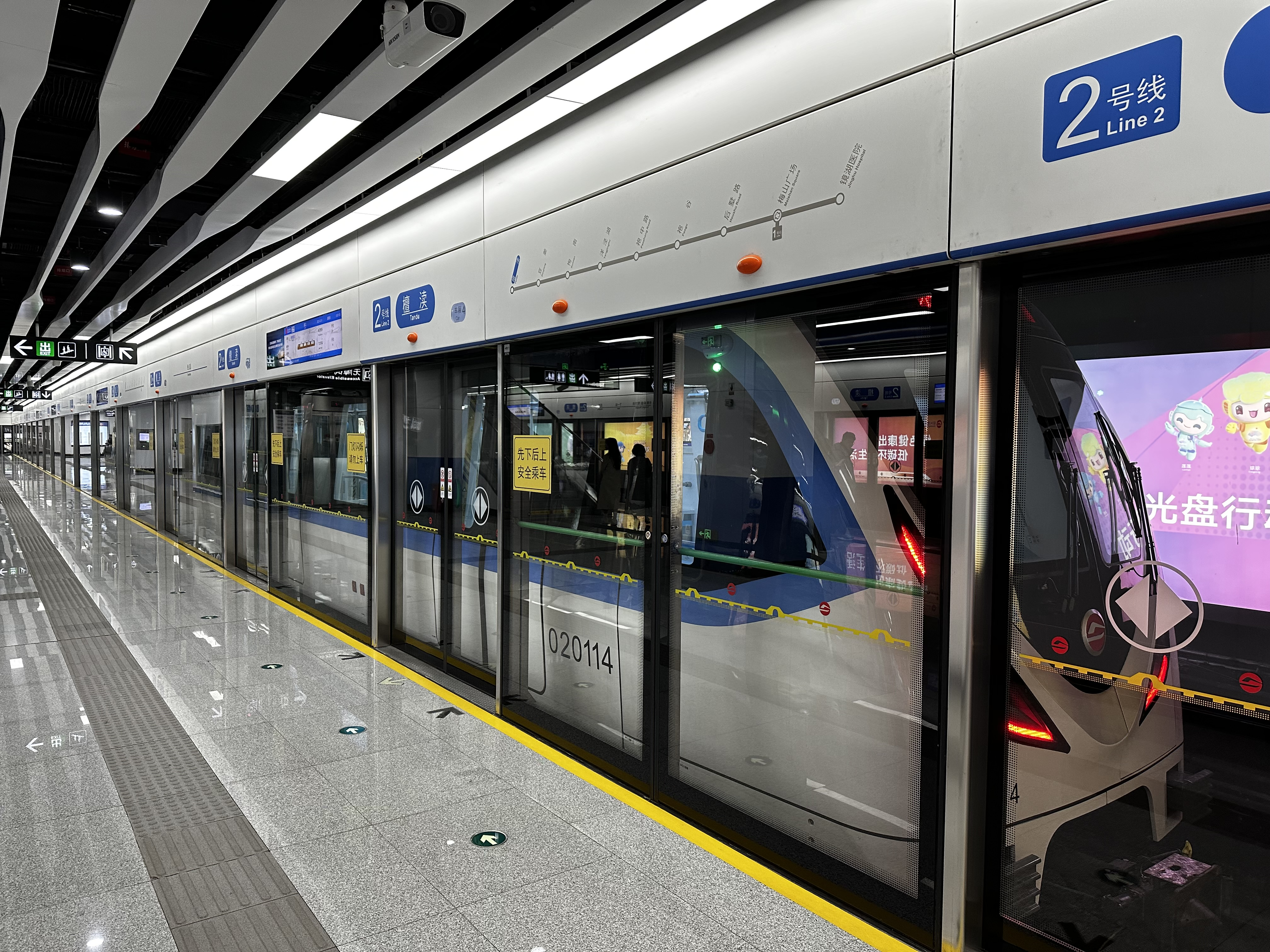
A line 2 train at Tandu Station, the current terminus of Line 2.

=== Line 2 ===
Line 2 is 10.73 km in length with 9 stations. All stations are located underground. Line 2 opened on 26 July 2023. The Phase two extension will connect the Yuecheng and Shangyu districts of Shaoxing.

=== Line 4 ===
Line 4, a southern extension of the Line 1 branch, is presently under construction. It includes 20.7 km of new track and 15 new underground stations. It is entirely located in Yuecheng district and will have two interchange stations with Line 1, with one at Huangjiu Town and City square.

== Lines under Construction ==
Route	Name	Termini		Planned Opening	Length	Stations	Status	Notes
2	Phase 2	Tandu	Liangzhu Avenue	2027	26.1 km	7	Under construction	
4	Line 4	Huangjiu Town	Yinqiao Road	Before 2030	20.7 km	15	Under construction	
Total					46.7	22		

=== Planned ===
The Phase II Construction Plan of the Shaoxing Metro, which encompasses Lines 3, and 5, are currently in the planning stages.

Lines S2 (Shaoxing–Zhuji) and S3 (Shaoxing–Shengzhou–Xinchang) are also under planning.

=== Rolling Stock ===
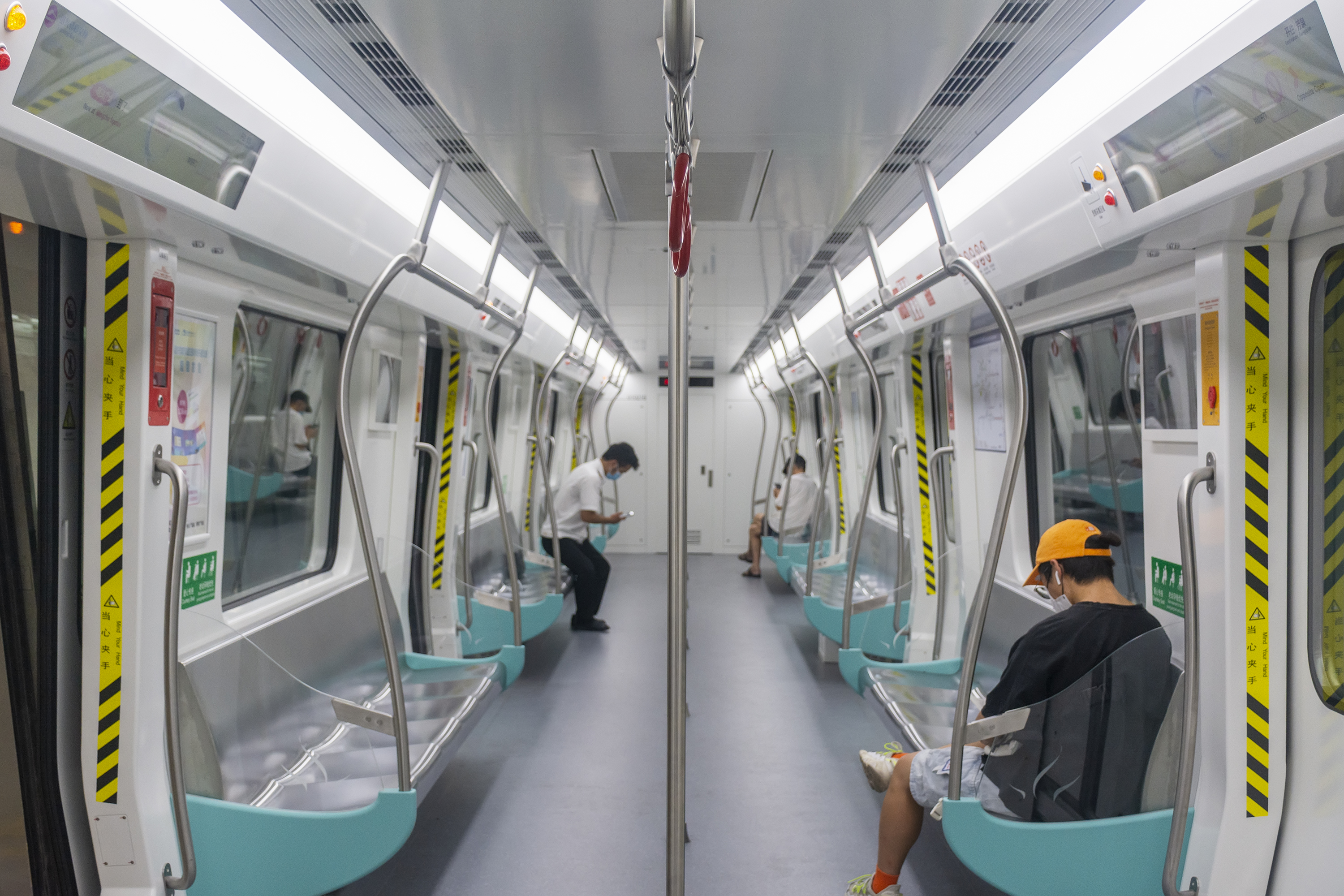
The inside of a Line 1 train

Line 1 utilizes rolling stock produced by CRRC Nanjing Puzhen, with a length of 120 m, height of 3.8 m and width of 2.88 m. It has 2 power cars with 6 cars in total. Each train set has 232 seats with a maximum capacity of 2034 people. It has a top speed of 100 km/h. It features LCD screens that display the station information.

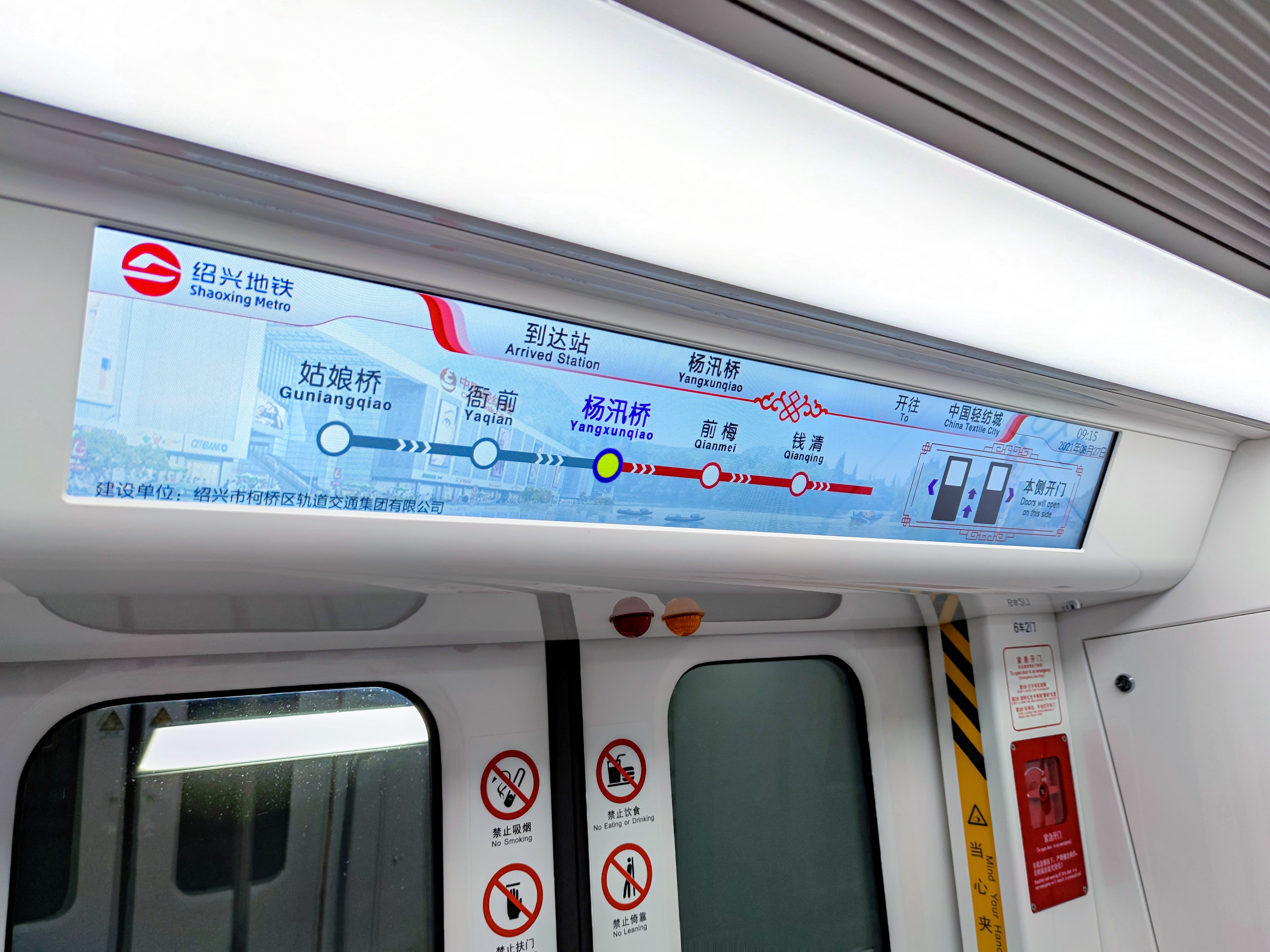
The LCD screen in a Line 1 train

Line 2 ultilizes 4 car trainsets from CRRC Nanjing Puzhen, with a length of 80.84 m and a width of 2.88 m. Line 2 is self driving with windows on both ends of the train. It also features LCD screens that display station information.

== Accidents ==
On 13 September 2025 at around 23:40, four cleaners were struck by a train on Line 2, with 3 dead and 1 severely injured. The accident happened outside service hours.
