= Hangzhou–Changsha high-speed railway =

High-speed railway line in China

Hangzhou–Changsha high-speed railway 杭长高速铁路

Overview
- Status: Operational
- Owner: China Railway
- Locale: Zhejiang, Jiangxi, and Hunan
- Termini: Hangzhou East; Changsha South
- Stations: 21

Service
- Type: High-speed rail
- Operator(s): China Railway High-speed

History
- Opened: Changsha South–Nanchang West September 16, 2014; Hangzhou–Nanchang West December 10, 2014

Technical
- Line length: 921 km
- Track gauge: 1,435 mm (4 ft 8 1/2 in)
- Operating speed: 350 km/h
Route map
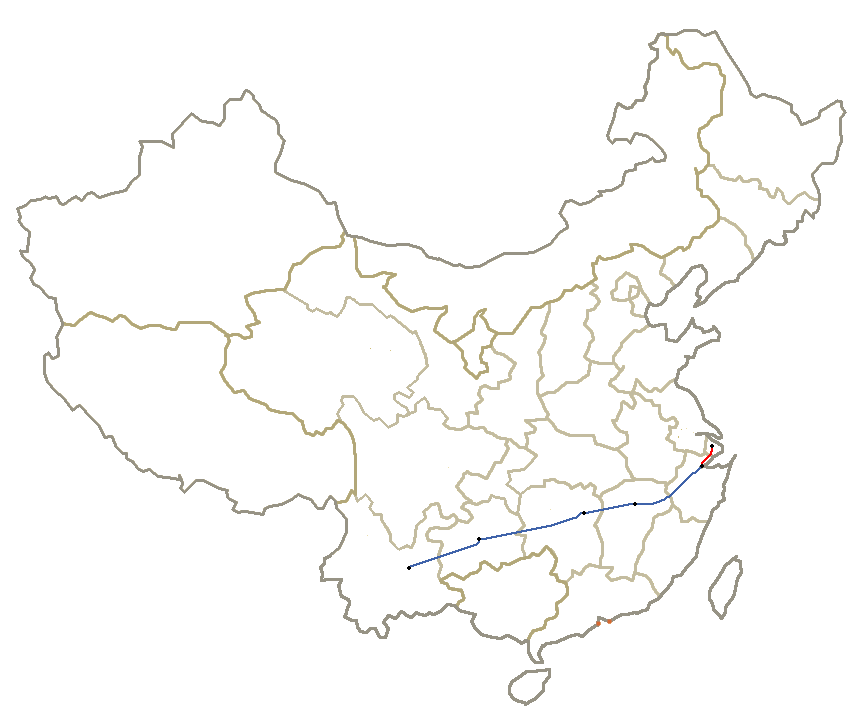

Hangzhou–Changsha high-speed railway is a China Railway High-speed line connecting Hangzhou, Nanchang, and Changsha, respectively the provincial capitals of Zhejiang, Jiangxi, and Hunan. This railway forms a section of the Shanghai–Kunming high-speed railway, part of the National Railway Grid Network, as one of the four major east-west lines.

It has a total length of 921.426 km (572.548 mi). Construction started in December 2009 and was opened to traffic on December 10, 2014. With trains from Hangzhou to Nanchang taking 2 hours 14 minutes, Hangzhou to Changsha in three hours and 36 minutes.

== Route ==
The route from east to west starts at Hangzhou East and makes stops at Hangzhou, Hangzhou South, Zhuji, Yiwu, Jinhua, Longyou, Quzhou, Jiangshan, Yushan South, Shangrao, Yiyang, Yingtan North, Fuzhou East, Jinxian South, Nanchang West, Gao'an South, Xinyu North, Yichun, Pingxiang North, Liling North, for a total of 21 stations when it reaches Changsha South.

Station	Chinese	Distance (km)	Prefecture	Province	Metro transfers
Hangzhou East	杭州东	0.00	Hangzhou	Zhejiang	1 4 6 19
Hangzhou	杭州		Hangzhou	Zhejiang	1 5
Hangzhou South	杭州南	169.00	Hangzhou	Zhejiang	5
Zhuji	诸暨		Shaoxing	Zhejiang	
Yiwu	义乌		Jinhua	Zhejiang	
Jinhua	金华		Jinhua	Zhejiang	
Longyou	龙游		Quzhou	Zhejiang	
Quzhou	衢州		Quzhou	Zhejiang	
Jiangshan	江山		Quzhou		
Yushan South	玉山南		Shangrao	Jiangxi	
Shangrao	上饶		Shangrao	Jiangxi	
Yiyang	弋阳		Shangrao	Jiangxi	
Yingtan North	鹰潭北		Yingtan	Jiangxi	
Fuzhou East	抚州东		Fuzhou	Jiangxi	
Jinxian South	进贤南		Nanchang	Jiangxi	
Nanchang West	南昌西		Nanchang	Jiangxi	2
Gao'an	高安		Yichun	Jiangxi	
Xinyu North	新余北		Xinyu	Jiangxi	
Yichun	宜春		Yichun	Jiangxi	
Pingxiang North	萍乡北		Pingxiang	Jiangxi	
Liling East	醴陵东		Zhuzhou	Hunan	
Changsha South	长沙南		Changsha	Hunan	2 4 Maglev

== History ==
=== Preparation ===
- In 2004, the State Council, published the "Long-term railway network plan." This proposed for consideration the Hangzhou-Changsha HSR.
- June 2005 – Hangzhou–Changsha HSR is approved by the State to study routes from Hangzhou, by the way of Nanchang, to Changsha.
- December 6 to 7, 2008 – the Ministry of Railways joins with municipal and county governments along the railway line, a consultative company, Shanghai Railway Bureau, Nanchang Railway Bureau, Guangzhou Railway Group, the Chengdu Railway Bureau, Kunming Railway and other units at a meeting held in Changsha. Examining the Hangzhou-Changsha HSR pre-feasibility study and discussing its construction.
- May 2009 – Hangzhou–Changsha HSR feasibility study is reviewed by the Ministry of Railway.
- June 1, 2009 – Survey work along the route to start.

=== Construction ===
- December 2009 – Construction commences.
- April 22, 2013 – Start of electrification construction.

=== Opening and operation ===
- September 16, 2014 – Changsha–Nanchang section opens and begins operations
- December 10, 2014 – Hangzhou–Nanchang section opens and begins operations. At the same time there are more classes opened long Shanghai high-speed EMU trains.

== Accidents ==
=== Construction accident ===
March 17, 2011 – A tunnel collapsed during construction in Hangzhou's Xiaoshan District, killing two people and leaving one person slightly injured.
