= Yichun railway station =

Railway station in Yichun, Jiangxi, China

Coordinates: 27.7909301°N 114.4315999°E

Yichun 宜春
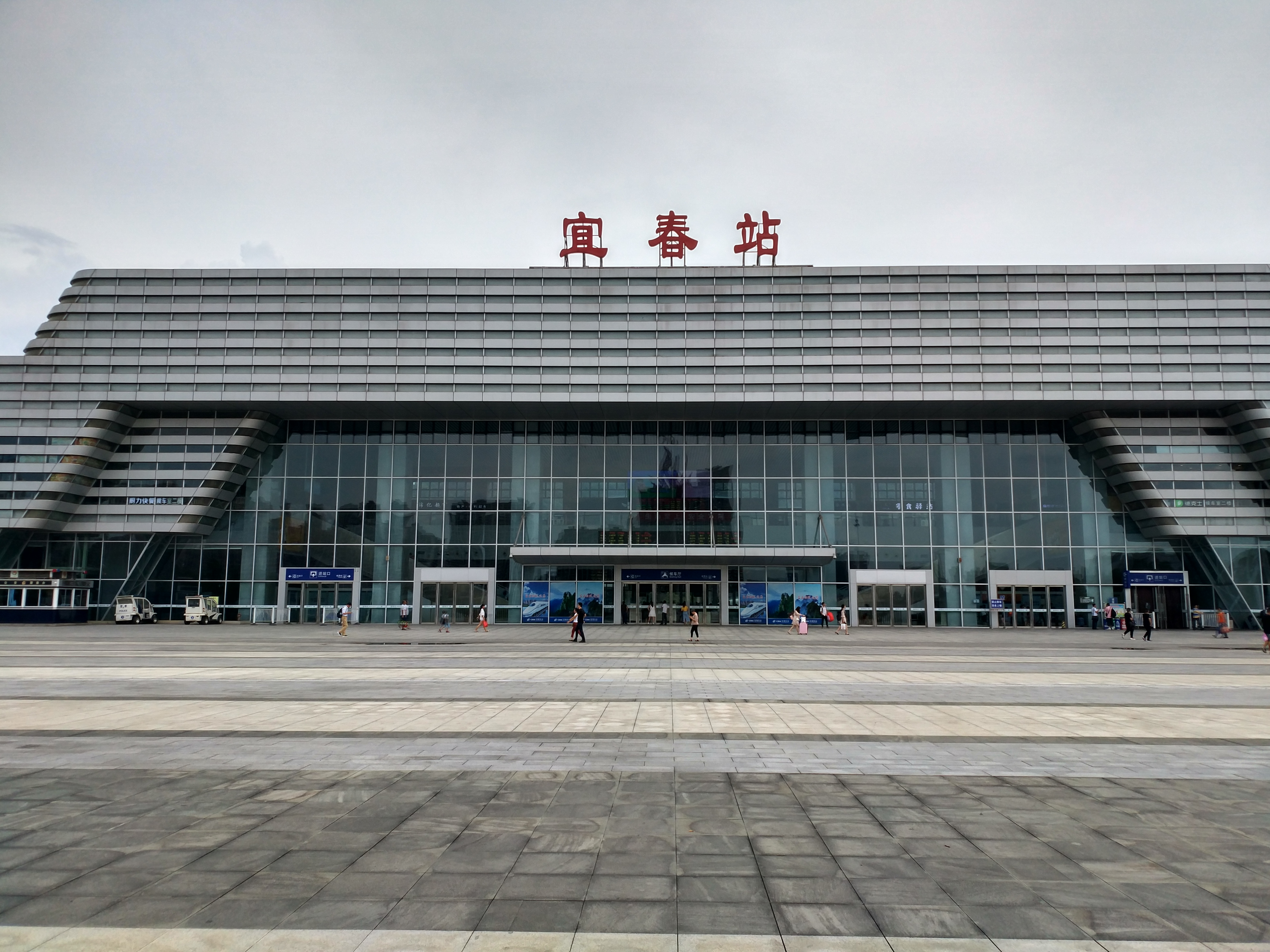

General information
- Location: Yuanzhou District, Yichun, Jiangxi; China
- Operator: China Railway
- Lines: Shanghai–Kunming High-Speed Railway, Shanghai–Kunming Railway
- Platforms: 6

Other information
- Station code: TMIS code: 65646; Telegraph code: YEG; Pinyin code: YCH
- Classification: 2nd class station

History
- Former names: Yichun East
Location

Yichun railway station is a station on the Hangzhou-Changsha High-Speed Railway, which is a part of the Shanghai-Kunming High-Speed Railway. It is located in Yichun, Jiangxi, China. The former name of this station was Yichun East Railway.

== See also ==
- Yichun West railway station

Preceding station	China Railway	Following station
Fenyi towards Shanghai or Shanghai South	Shanghai–Kunming railway	Pingxiang towards Kunming
Preceding station	China Railway High-speed	Following station
Xinyu North towards Shanghai Hongqiao	Shanghai–Kunming high-speed railway	Pingxiang North towards Kunming South
