= Yiwu railway station =

Railway station in Yiwu, China

Yiwu 义乌
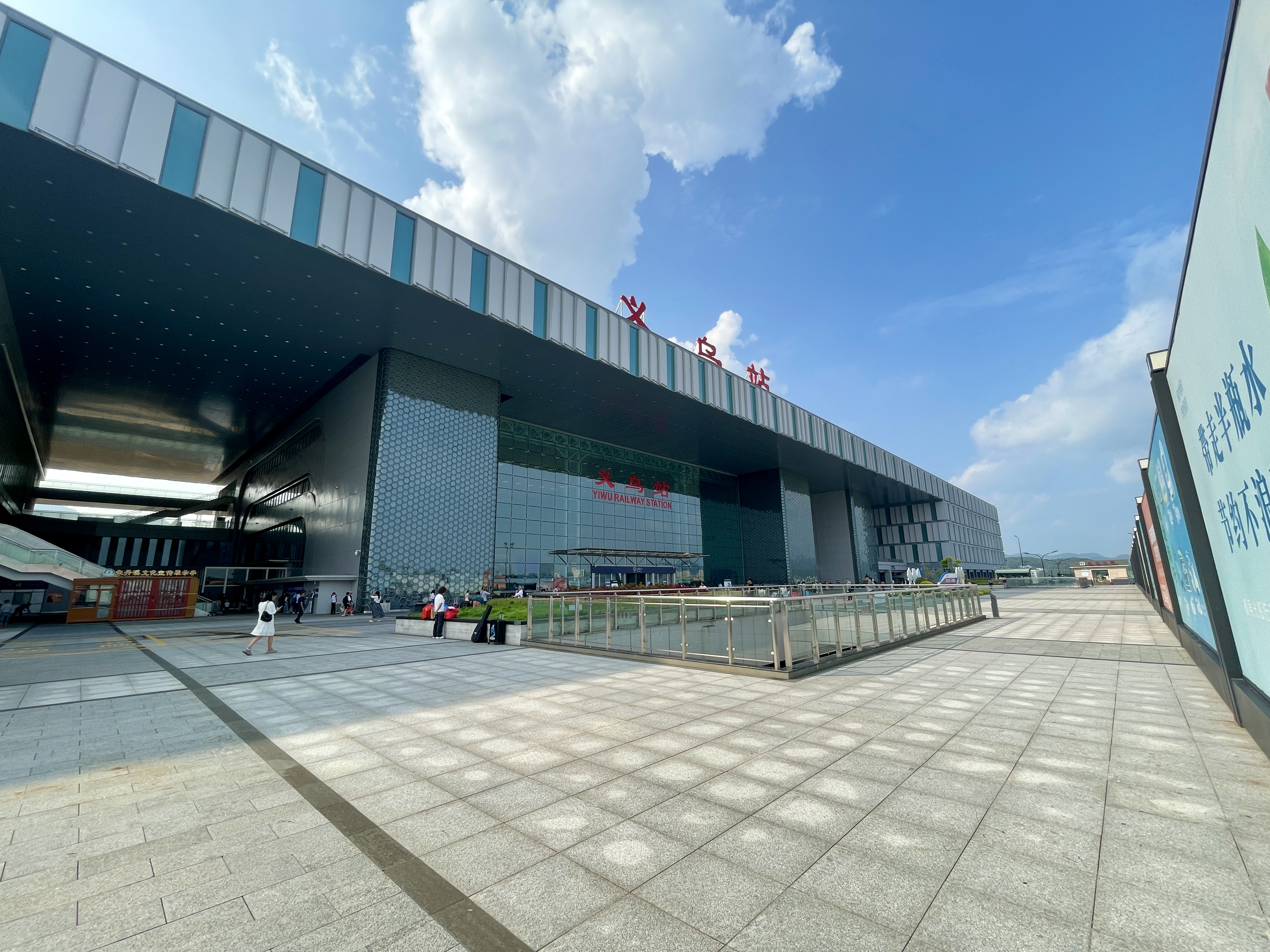

General information
- Location: Yiwu, Jinhua, Zhejiang; China
- Coordinates: 29°22′51″N 120°2′16″E
- Operated by: Shanghai Railway Bureau, China Railway Corporation
- Lines: Shanghai–Kunming railway; Shanghai–Kunming high-speed railway; Ningbo–Jinhua railway (under construction); Hangzhou–Wenzhou high-speed railway (under construction)
- Platforms: 11

Other information
- Station code: 32537 (TMIS code); YWH (telegraph code); YWU (pinyin code)
- Classification: 1st class station

History
- Opened: 2006
Location

Yiwu railway station (simplified Chinese: 义乌站; traditional Chinese: 義烏站; pinyin: Yìwū Zhàn) is a railway station of the Hukun Railway and the Hangchangkun Passenger Railway located in Yiwu, Jinhua, Zhejiang province, People's Republic of China. It is an important site on the Zhejiang-Jiangxi express railway line and under the administration of Shanghai Railway Bureau. Now it is a first-class station.

== Overview ==
Yiwu railway station offers a ticket hall, a waiting room, private dining rooms and has 2 500-meter-long platforms. Yiwu railway station also has a steel canopy. There is an enclosed bridge connecting the waiting hall and station, and the station is located on the west side of the basement. The ticket hall area is 1135.1 square meters, and is located east of the station house. The ticket hall area is equipped with central air conditioning and has 24 ticket windows where you can apply for a Visa, a refund, book tickets, ask for information and other services; sale of the national railway network within 10 days of booking tickets between stations. 5 passengers, tickets available at the following ticket outlets: Binwang ticket, Huangyuan ticket, International Trade City outlets, stations (White Swan Hotel) outlets, Dongyang River outlets and outlets. Lounge: Located at the west side of the station house, catering mainly to tourists, snacks, books, newspapers and other services. Waiting room: an area of 5893.1 square meters, located in the middle of the station house, two storeys waiting to lift transport, the entire hall with central air conditioning. Let the first and fourth floor waiting room, waiting room in the second and third floor. Top to bottom are equipped to provide services for visitors passenger duty room, the police duty room, toilets, tea rooms and other facilities. The first waiting room waiting area is mainly south direction, located 8 waiting channel, after the No. 1 ticket platform car; the fourth sub-waiting room followed by maternal and child soldiers and the waiting area, Ruanxi waiting area and VIP room. Maternal and child nursing and the military also has room waiting area. The second and third waiting room there were eight waiting channels. The second is the north direction of the main waiting room waiting area, waiting room for the third departure of the train station waiting Yiwu area. The second floor of the passenger check-in after waiting through the bridge to the second, third, fourth, fifth car platform. Line rooms: area 1324.7 square meters, the station house is located in the basement of the line package for shipping, the Railway Express package delivery business to run, which consists of Parcel dedicated transport channels. Waiting room has a curved front channels, for taxis and pedestrians; a station near the mouth of a dedicated channel to facilitate taxi passengers up and down. Station Square is currently still in construction, Station Road, Court Road will be opened to traffic as soon as possible. In addition, the Mall Road, North City Road, Zongze Road, Xuefeng Road will be extended to the Passenger Station Dengjun. To Dongyang, River and other places have fast access.

Location: Also in the northwest of Yiwu city, 4 km (2.5 mi) away from the airport, 9.5 km (5.9 mi) away from the urban centre.

== History ==
The first railway station in Yiwu was built during the 1930s and was located on the Shanghai–Kunming railway. As part of a project to shorten and upgrade the line, the present Yiwu railway station, to the north of the city, was built. The new station opened in 2006 and former central station was closed and the track through Yiwu lifted. In 2014, the Hangzhou–Changsha high-speed railway opened, which passes through this station.

| Preceding station | China Railway | Following station |
|---|---|---|
| Pujiang towards Shanghai or Shanghai South | Shanghai–Kunming railway | Yiwu West towards Kunming |
| Preceding station | China Railway High-speed | Following station |
| Zhuji towards Shanghai Hongqiao | Shanghai–Kunming high-speed railway | Jinhua towards Kunming South |
