= Shangrao railway station =

Railway station in Shangrao, China

Shangrao 上饶
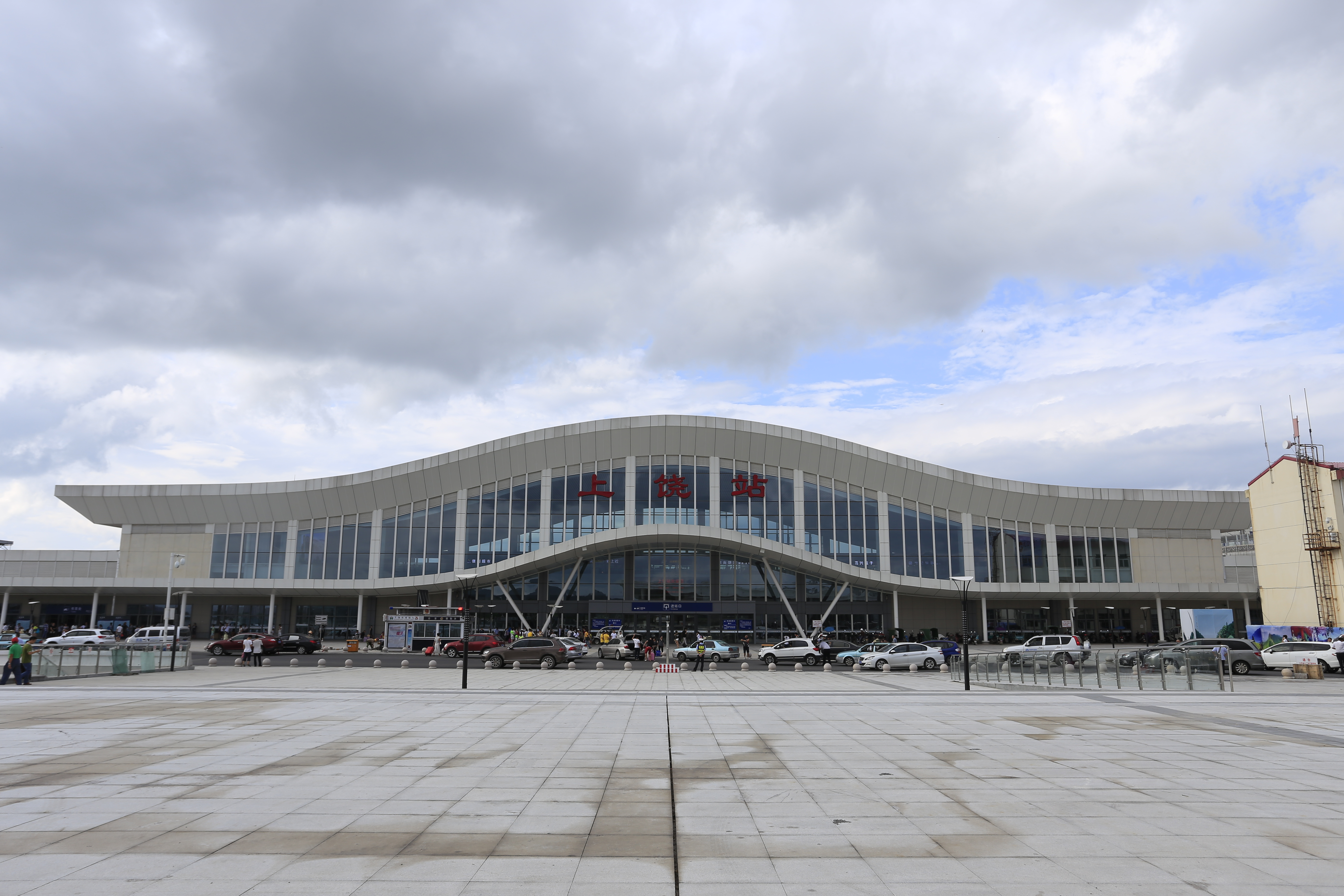
- Present-day building

General information
- Location: Xinzhou, Shangrao, Jiangxi; China
- Coordinates: 28°29′39″N 118°00′04″E
- Lines: Shanghai–Kunming railway; Shanghai–Kunming high-speed railway; Hefei–Fuzhou high-speed railway
Location

Shangrao railway station (Chinese: 上饶站) is a railway station located in Xinzhou District, Shangrao, Jiangxi Province, People's Republic of China.

It serves the railway junction of Hangzhou–Changsha section of Shanghai–Kunming High-Speed Railway (Hukun HSR) and Hefei–Fuzhou High-Speed Railway (Hefu HSR).

This station has platforms on both the north–south Hefei–Fuzhou high-speed railway and the west–east Hangzhou–Changsha high-speed railway. There is a loop north of the station allowing trains arriving from the south to continue east or west, and vice versa.

== Pictures ==
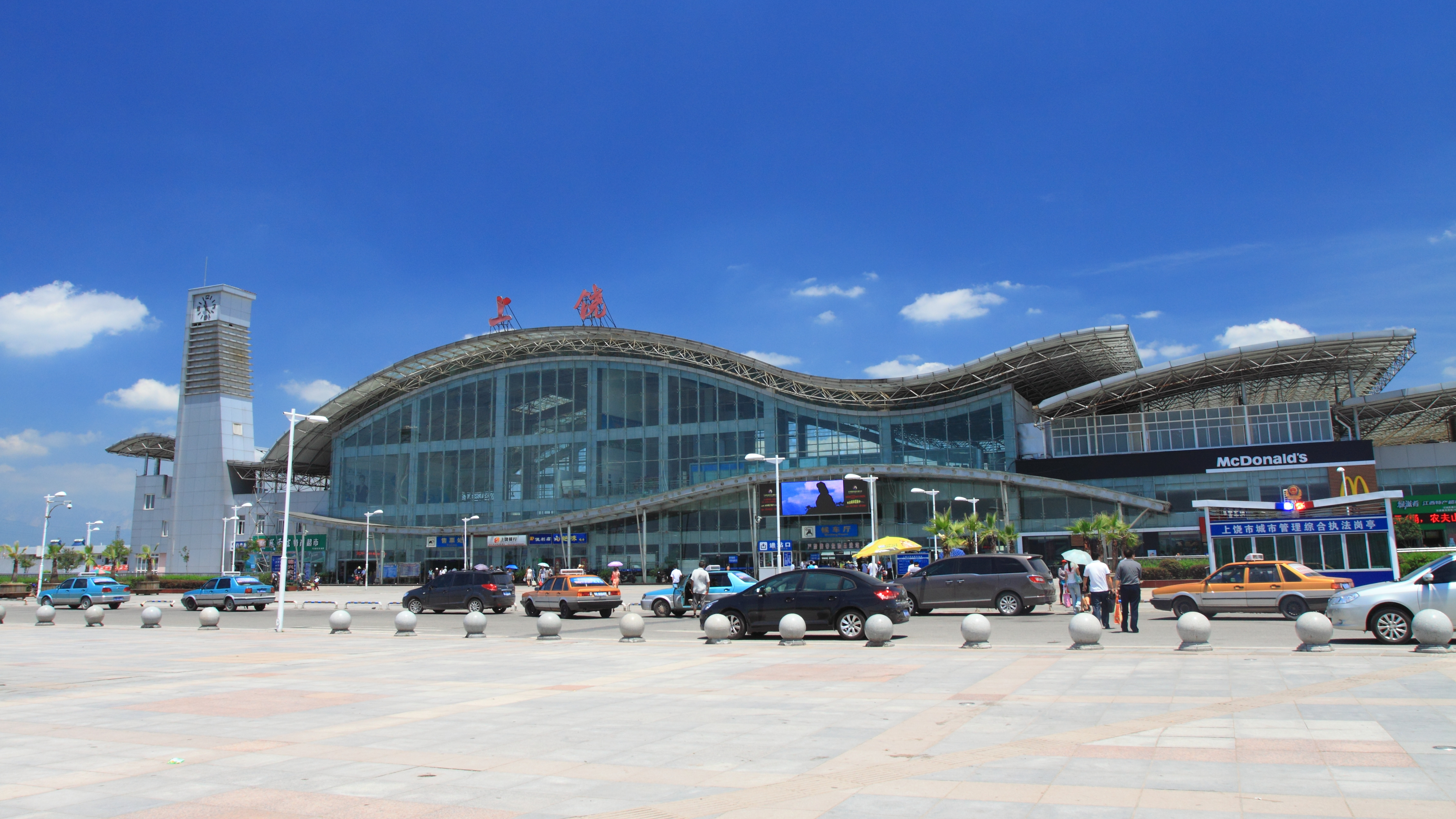
The old terminal of Shangrao railway station, which is abandoned now.

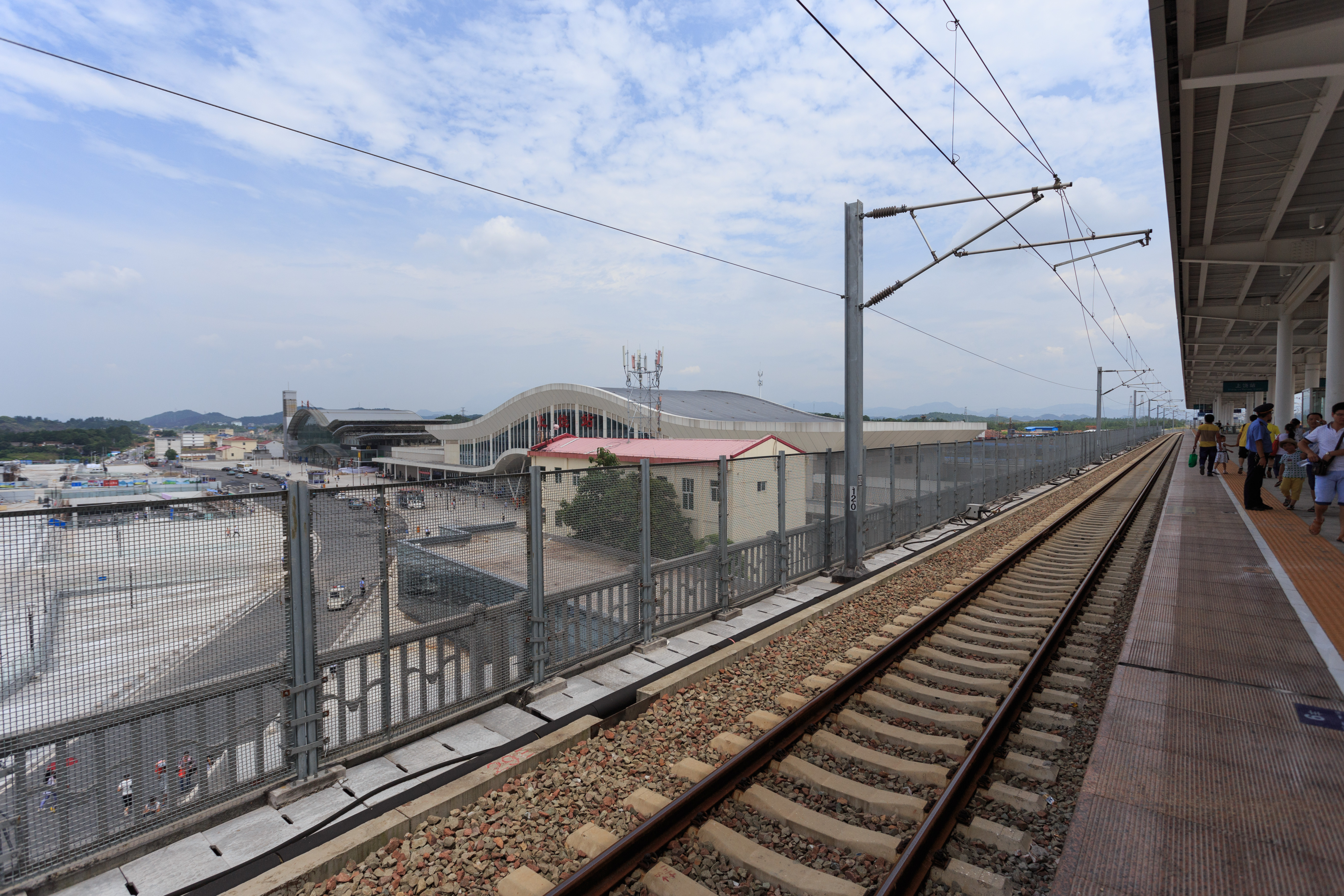
Watching the terminals from the Hefei-Fuzhou HSR Yard in upper layer.

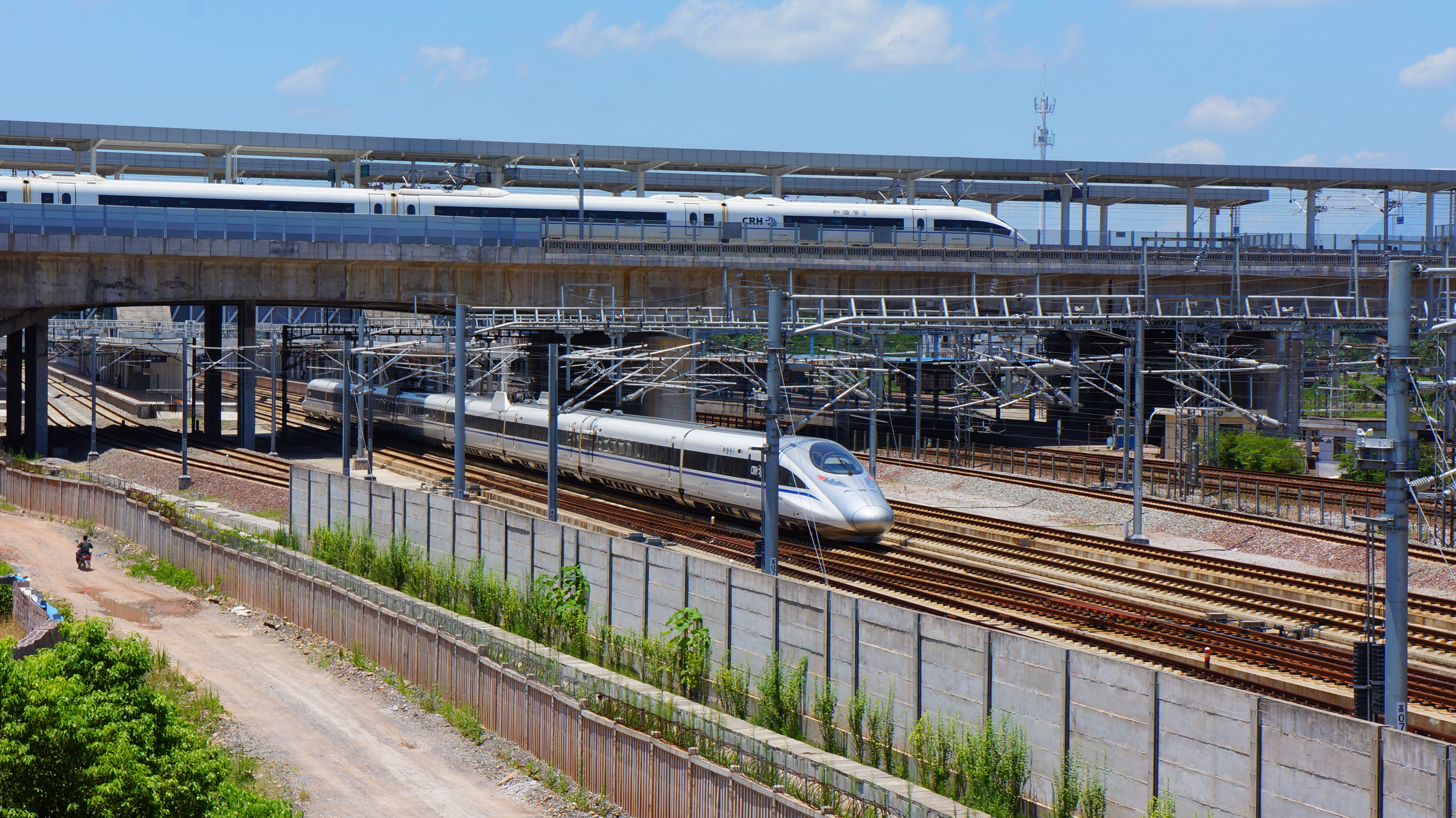
Yards and Platforms of Shangrao railway station: The upper layer is the Hefei-Fuzhou HSR Yard, the Shanghai-Kunming HSR Yard and Shanghai-Kunming Yard are in the lower level.

Preceding station	China Railway	Following station
Yushan towards Shanghai or Shanghai South	Shanghai–Kunming railway	Hengfeng towards Kunming
Preceding station	China Railway High-speed	Following station
Yushan South towards Shanghai Hongqiao	Shanghai–Kunming high-speed railway	Yiyang towards Kunming South
Dexing towards Hefei South	Hefei–Fuzhou high-speed railway Part of the Beijing–Fuzhou high-speed railway	Wufushan towards Fuzhou
