= Yiyang railway station (Jiangxi) =

Railway station in Shangrao, China

Yiyang railway station 弋阳站
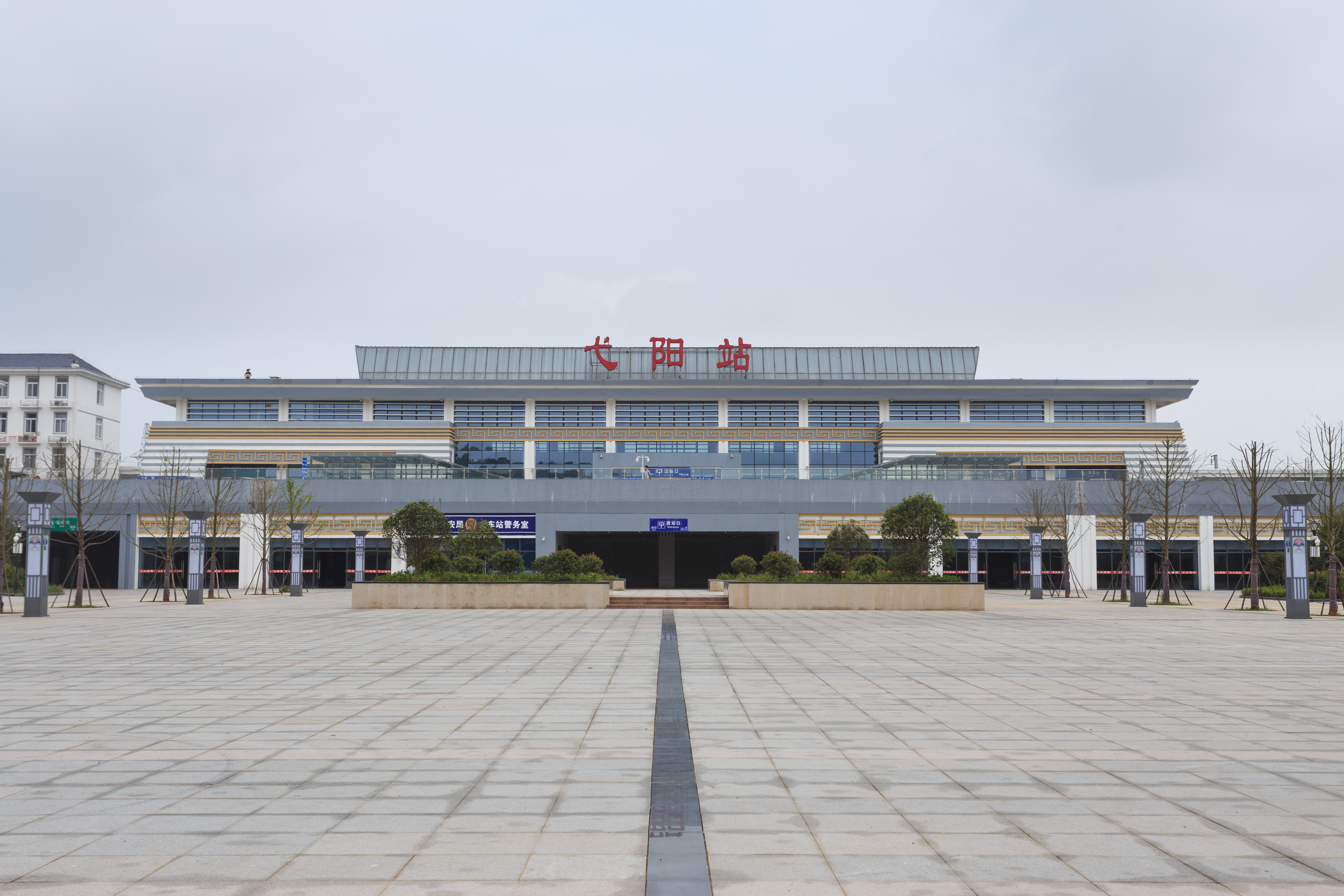
- Yiyang railway station.

General information
- Location: Yiyang County, Shangrao, Jiangxi Province; China
- Coordinates: 28°24′53″N 117°26′23″E
- Operator: China Railway
- Lines: Shanghai–Kunming railway Shanghai–Kunming high-speed railway
- Platforms: 3

History
- Opened: 1963

Chinese name
- Traditional Chinese: 弋陽站
- Simplified Chinese: 弋阳站
Transcriptions
Standard Mandarin
- Hanyu Pinyin: Yìyáng Zhàn
Location

Yiyang railway station (Chinese: 弋阳站) is a railway station of Hangchangkun Passenger Railway located in Yiyang County, Shangrao, Jiangxi Province, China.

Preceding station	China Railway	Following station
Hengfeng towards Shanghai or Shanghai South	Shanghai–Kunming railway	Guixi towards Kunming
Preceding station	China Railway High-speed	Following station
Shangrao towards Shanghai Hongqiao	Shanghai–Kunming high-speed railway	Yingtan North towards Kunming South
