= Zhuji railway station =

Railway station in Zhuji, China

Zhuji 诸暨
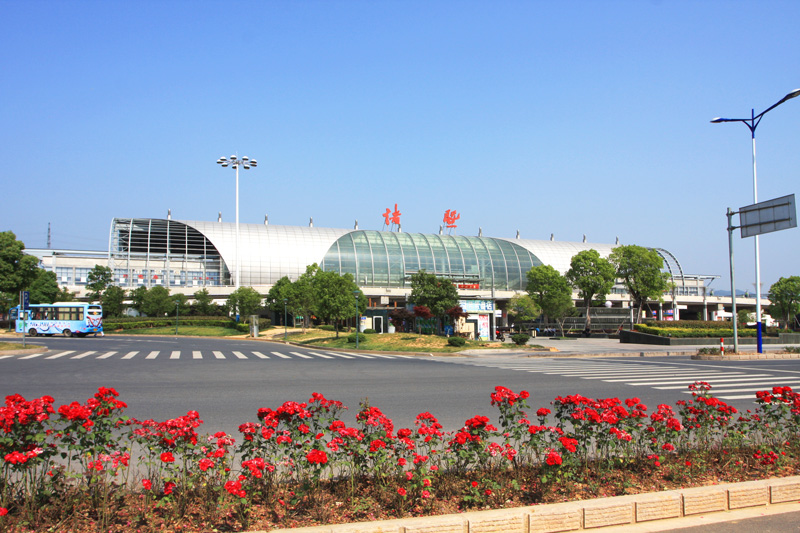
- Zhuji railway station

General information
- Location: Zhuji, Shaoxing, Zhejiang; China
- Coordinates: 29°43′43.98″N 120°10′51.43″E
- Operated by: Shanghai Railway Bureau, China Railway Corporation
- Lines: Hukun Railway, Hangchangkun Passenger Railway
- Platforms: 2

Other information
- Station code: TMIS code: 32501; Telegraph code: ZDH; Pinyin code: ZJI
- Classification: 2nd class station

History
- Opened: 1931

Services
Preceding station	China Railway High-speed	Following station
Hangzhou South towards Shanghai Hongqiao	Shanghai–Kunming high-speed railway	Yiwu towards Kunming South
Preceding station	China Railway	Following station
Zhuji East towards Shanghai or Shanghai South	Shanghai–Kunming railway	Paitou towards Kunming
Location

Zhuji railway station (simplified Chinese: 诸暨站; traditional Chinese: 諸暨站; pinyin: Zhūjì zhàn) is a railway station of Hangchangkun Passenger Railway. The station is located in Zhuji, Shaoxing, Zhejiang, China.

== History ==
The station opened in July 1931. On 16 June 2006, Zhuji railway station opened to public at the current site with a designed capacity of 3000 people. The waiting room has gone through renovation in August–September 2022 to provide a clean, orderly and comfortable environment.
