= Pingxiang North railway station =

Railway station in Pingxiang, China

Pingxiangbei 萍乡北
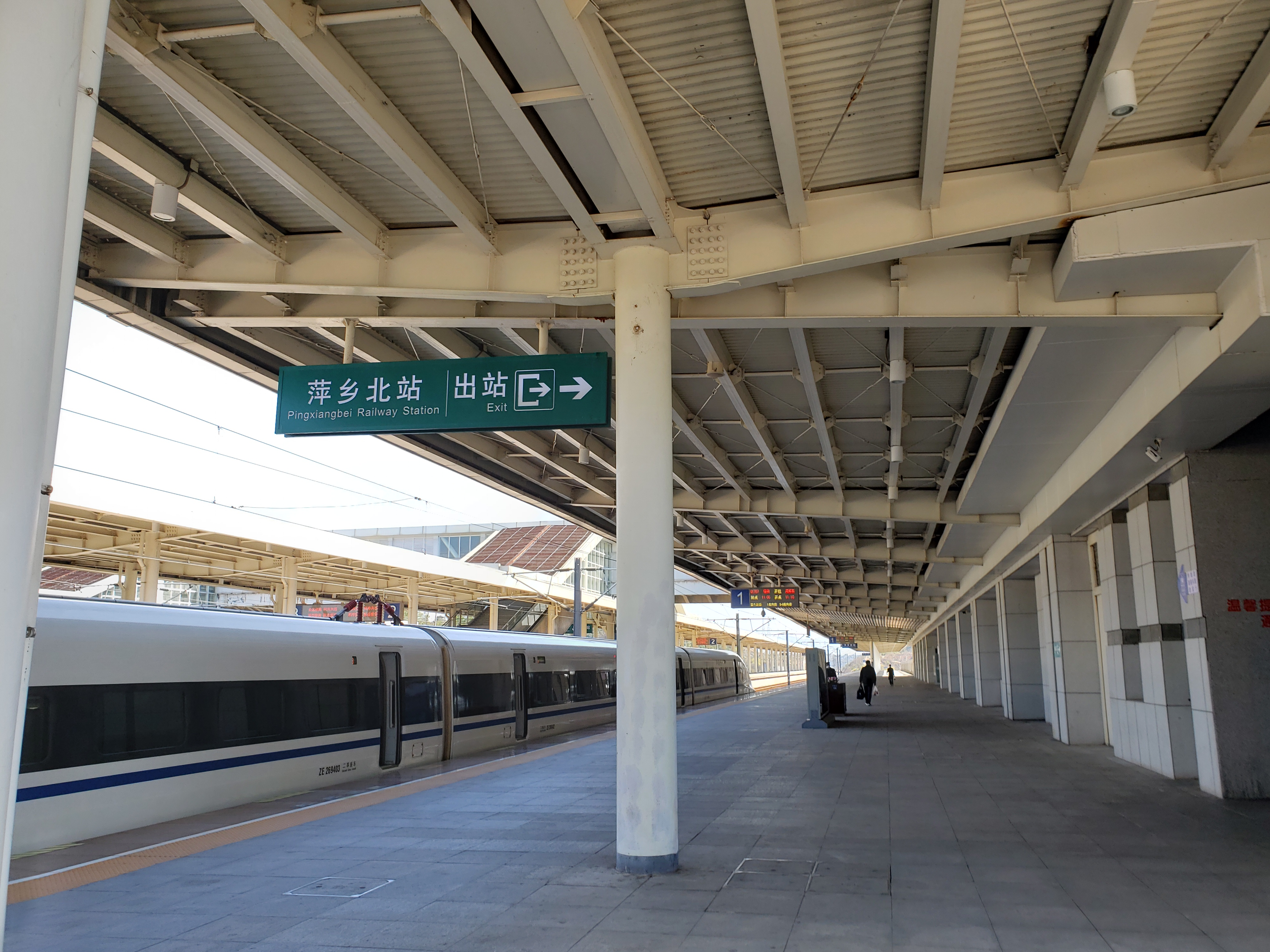
- Pingxiang North railway station, 2020

General information
- Location: China
- Coordinates: 27°39′03″N 113°50′08″E

Other information
- Station code: IATA: PXG; TMIS code: 65649; Telegraph code: PBG; Pinyin code: PXB
- Classification: 2nd class station
Location

The Pingxiang North railway station (Chinese: 萍乡北站) is a railway station located in Pingxiang, in the western Jiangxi province, People's Republic of China, serving the Hangzhou–Changsha High-Speed Railway. The planned Changsha–Ganzhou high-speed railway will also stop here.

| Preceding station | China Railway High-speed | Following station |
|---|---|---|
| Yichun towards Shanghai Hongqiao | Shanghai–Kunming high-speed railway | Liling East towards Kunming South |
