= Dizhuang railway station =

Railway station in Huaihua, China

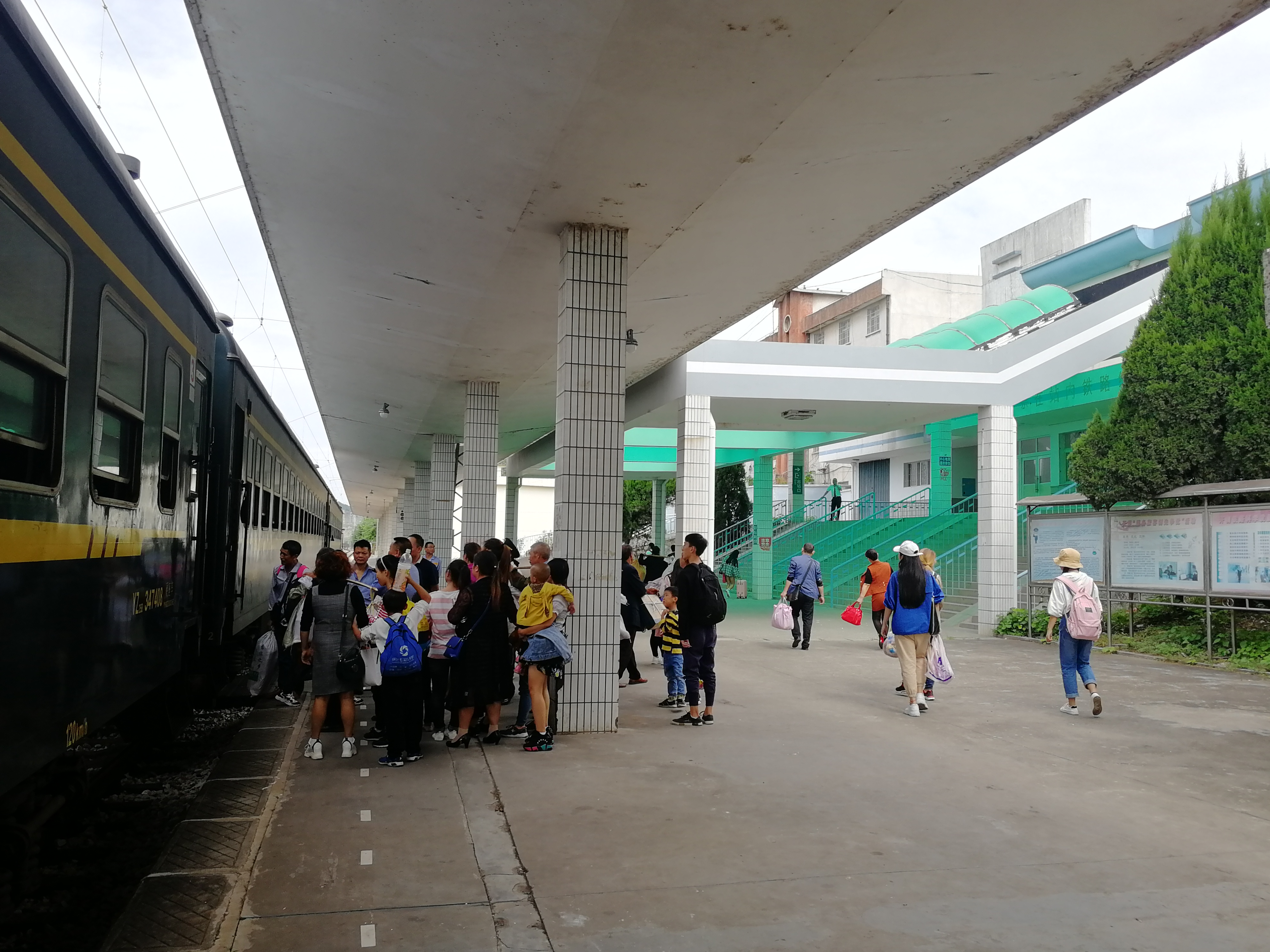

Dizhuang railway station is a railway station in Dizhuang Town, Xupu County, Huaihua, Hunan. It is on the Zhuzhou–Guiyang railway, part of the Shanghai–Kunming railway. It was built in 1972, and is administered by China Railway Guangzhou Group.

| Preceding station | China Railway | Following station |
|---|---|---|
| Anhua towards Shanghai or Shanghai South | Shanghai–Kunming railway | Xupu towards Kunming |
