= Yushan South railway station =

Railway station in Jiangxi, China

Coordinates: 28.6503°N 118.2878°E

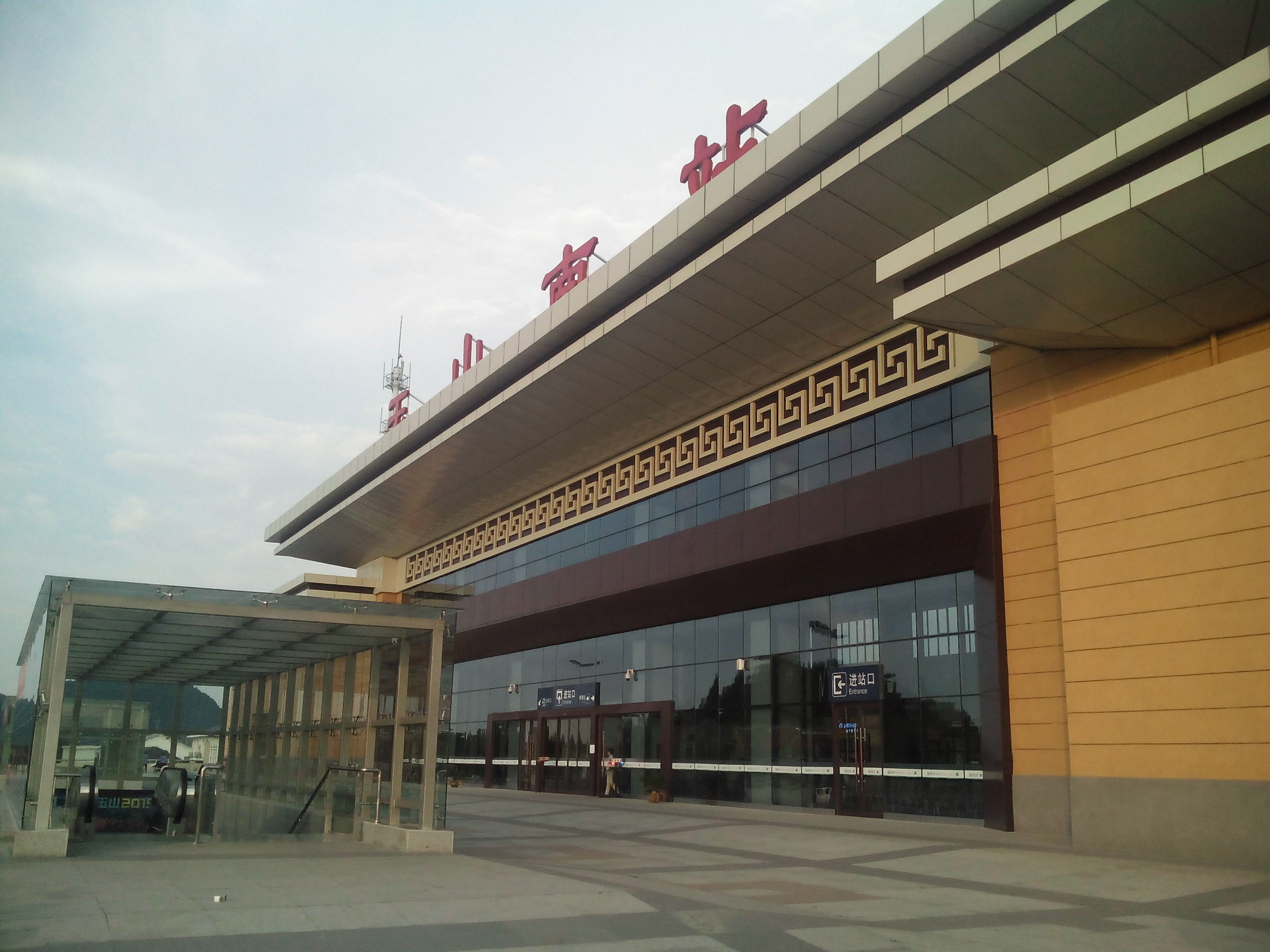
Facade of Yushan South Railway Station

Yushan South railway station is a railway station of Hangchangkun Passenger Railway located in Yushan County, Shangrao, Jiangxi, People's Republic of China.

Preceding station	China Railway High-speed	Following station
Jiangshan towards Shanghai Hongqiao	Shanghai–Kunming high-speed railway	Shangrao towards Kunming South
