= Fuzhou East railway station =

Railway station in Fuzhou, Jiangxi, China

Coordinates: 28.264257°N 116.611808°E

Fuzhou East railway station (抚州东站) is a railway station located on the northern outskirts of the county seat of Dongxiang County, in prefecture-level city of Fuzhou (not to be confused with larger Fuzhou, Fujian), in Jiangxi province, eastern China.

It serves the Shanghai–Kunming high-speed railway.

Preceding station	China Railway High-speed	Following station
Yingtan North towards Shanghai Hongqiao	Shanghai–Kunming high-speed railway	Jinxian South towards Kunming South
