= Yiyang railway station =

Yiyang railway station, may refer to:

- Yiyang railway station (Jiangxi), in Yiyang County, Jiangxi, China
- Yiyang railway station (Hunan), in Yiyang, Hunan, China
