= Gao'an railway station =

Railway station in Jiangxi, China

Coordinates: 28.47°N 115.38°E

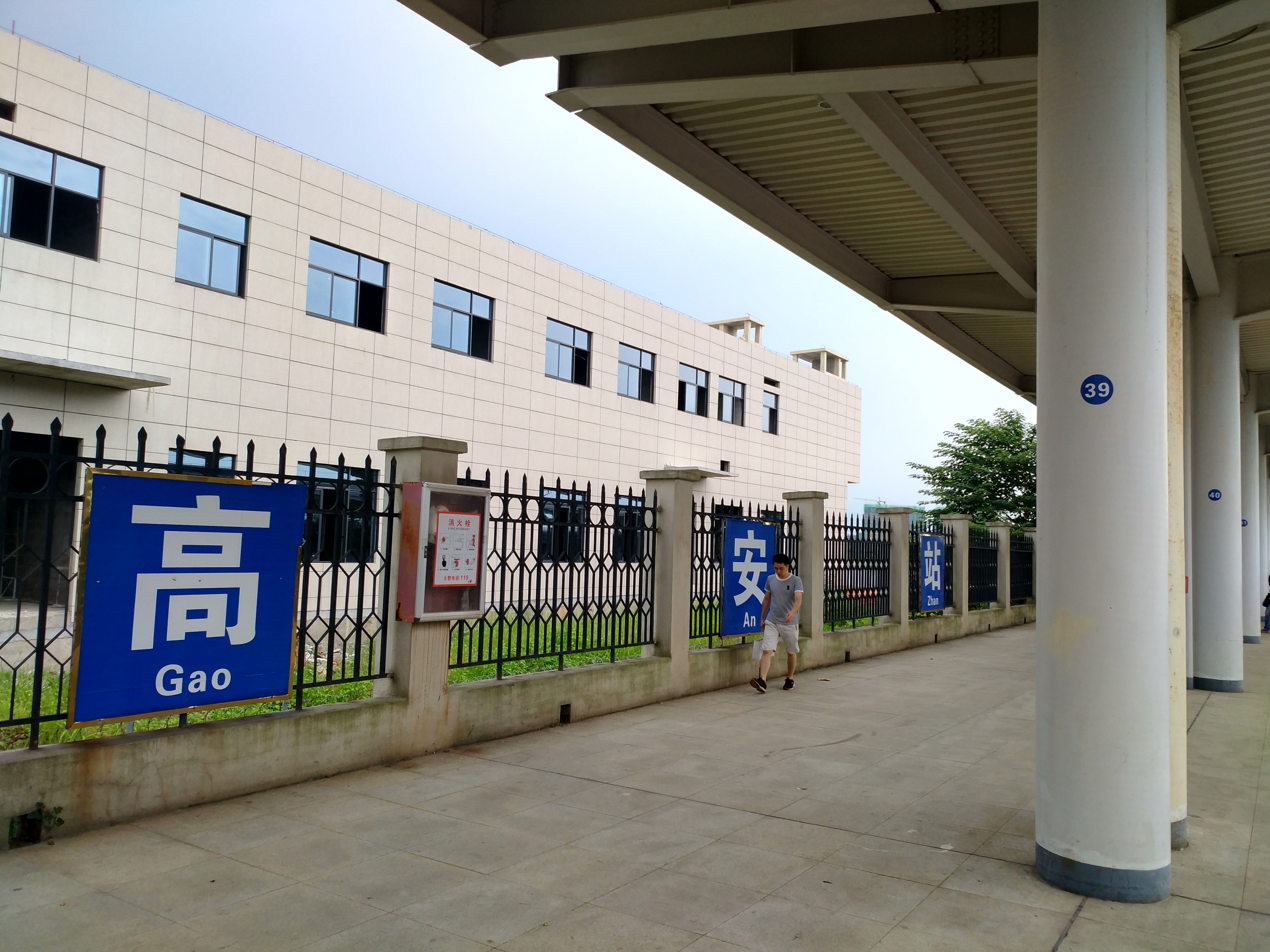
Gao'an Railway Station

Gao'an railway station is a railway station on the Shanghai–Kunming high-speed railway located in Jiangxi, People's Republic of China. It is the first station to serve Gao'an.

== History ==
The station opened on 16 September 2014.

Preceding station	China Railway High-speed	Following station
Nanchang West towards Shanghai Hongqiao	Shanghai–Kunming high-speed railway	Xinyu North towards Kunming South
