= Xinyu North railway station =

Railway station in Xinyu, China

Coordinates: 27.9151°N 114.8913°E

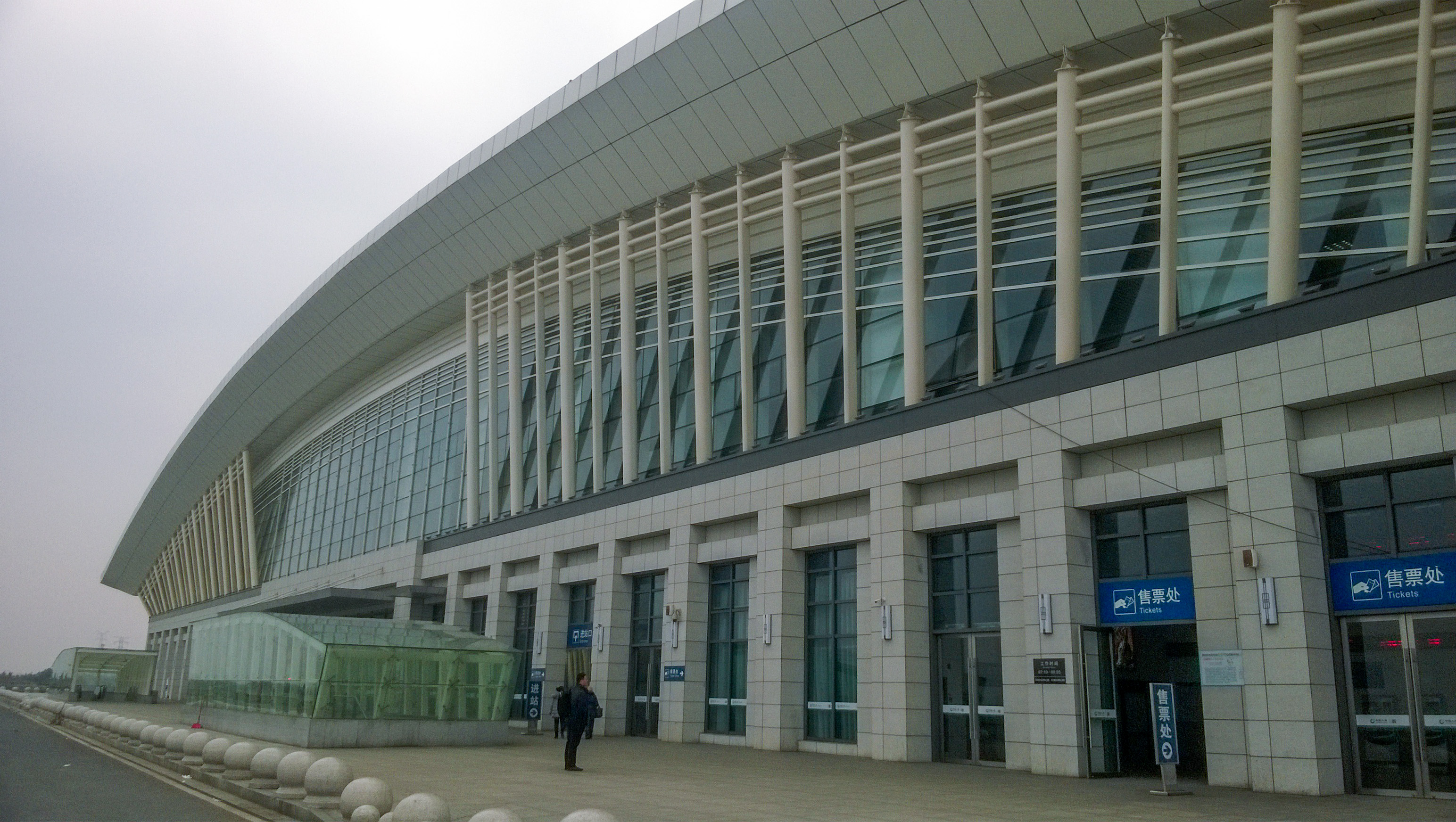
Close View of Xinyu North railway station Building

Xinyu North railway station is a railway station of Hangchangkun Passenger Railway located in Yushui District, Xinyu, Jiangxi, People's Republic of China.

Preceding station	China Railway High-speed	Following station
Gao'an towards Shanghai Hongqiao	Shanghai–Kunming high-speed railway	Yichun towards Kunming South
