= 2010 Jiangxi derailment =

Railway accident in Fuzhou, Jiangxi, China

Fuzhou derailment
- Location within China

Details
- Date: 23 May 2010 (BT); 2:10 BT (18:10 UTC)
- Location: Fuzhou, Jiangxi
- Coordinates: 28.23423°N 116.70845°E
- Country: People's Republic of China
- Line: Shanghai-Kunming railway
- Operator: China Railway
- Incident type: Derailment
- Cause: Earlier landslide damaged rails

Statistics
- Trains: 1 (Train No: K859)
- Deaths: 19
- Injured: 71

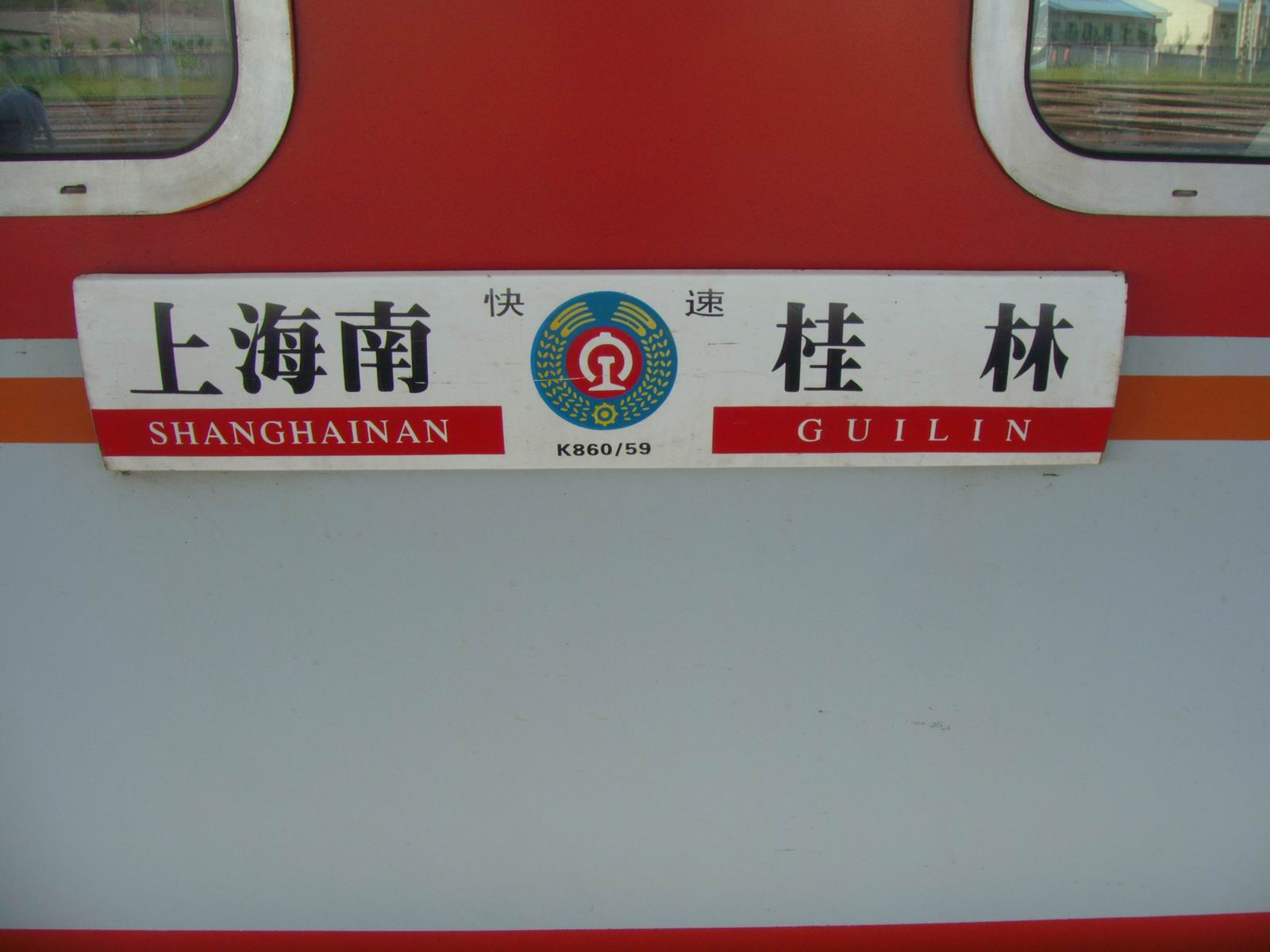
An information board of the train K859/860.

At around CST 2:10 a.m. (UTC+8) on 23 May 2010, train K859 travelling from Shanghai to Guilin derailed in a mountainous area in Dongxiang County, within Fuzhou, Jiangxi. At least 19 people died, and 71 were injured. At least 53 people were rescued and another 280 were taken from the train. Within 12 hours all survivors had been removed as the rescue effort got underway.

== Incident ==
According to the Ministry of Railways, the train was derailed by flaws in the track caused by a landslide. The landslide was caused by previous days of heavy rain and flooding in the region, with recent storms in the area having led to the evacuation of 44,600 people and a further 1.46 million people having been affected by the storms. Some carriages were found overturned, and one carriage was said to have "twisted and crushed another".

A passenger, who broke his arm but managed to escape the wreckage without help, reportedly "saw bits of bodies on the floor." A member of the railway police at the scene said, "each carriage had 118 seats. It is not yet immediately known how many passengers were aboard." More than 280 passengers were evacuated from the train and 53 had been freed from the wreckage as of 9:00 CST on Sunday. Four legal medical experts were requested to assist with identification of bodies.

== Response ==
The derailment caused the closure of the Shanghai-Kunming railway line. Around 2,000 people, among them fire-fighters, police and soldiers, removed at least 280 trapped passengers and other people from the wreckage. An investigation was launched by Chinese authorities. The incident occurred on the same day as a truck and bus collision which killed 32 people and hospitalised 21 others. Within 24 hours all of the derailed carriages had been removed from the site. Rail services resumed at around 22:00 23 May 2010 (BT).

== See also ==
- 2010 Merano train derailment
- 2008 Shandong train collision
