= Liling East railway station =

Railway station in Liling, China

Liling East railway station is a railway station of Shanghai–Kunming high-speed railway located in Hunan, People's Republic of China.

== See also ==
- Liling railway station

Preceding station	China Railway High-speed	Following station
Pingxiang North towards Shanghai Hongqiao	Shanghai–Kunming high-speed railway	Changsha South towards Kunming South
