= Dexing railway station =

Railway station in Shangrao, Jiangxi

Dexing 德兴
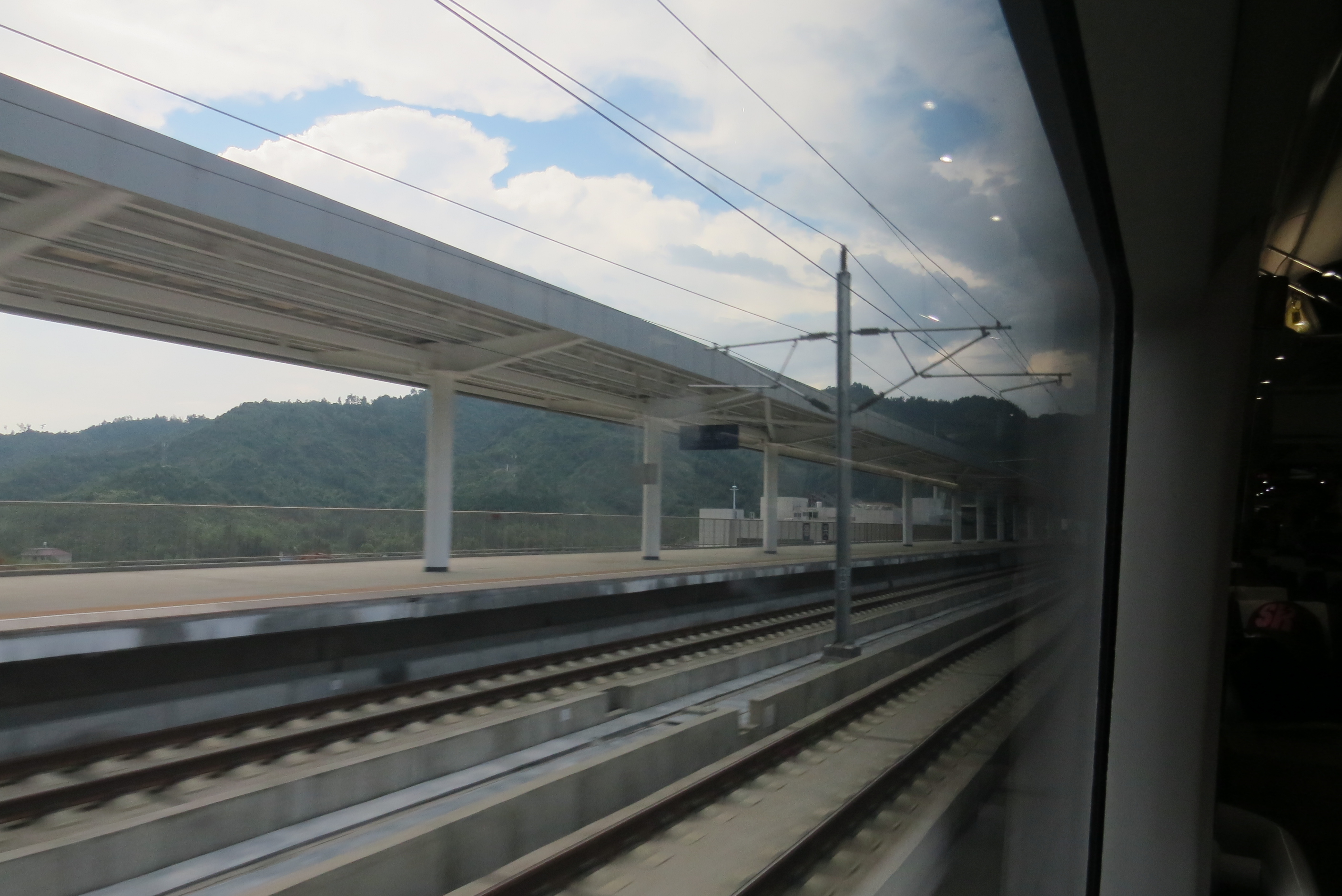

General information
- Location: Dexing, Shangrao, Jiangxi; China
- Coordinates: 28°57′39.14″N 117°51′20.10″E
- Line(s): Hefei–Fuzhou high-speed railway

History
- Opened: 28 June 2015
Location

Dexing railway station (Chinese: 德兴站) is a railway station in Dexing, Shangrao, Jiangxi, China. It is an intermediate stop on the Hefei–Fuzhou high-speed railway. It opened with the line on 28 June 2015.

Preceding station	China Railway High-speed	Following station
Wuyuan towards Hefei South	Hefei–Fuzhou high-speed railway	Shangrao towards Fuzhou
