= Jinxian South railway station =

Railway station in Jiangxi, China

Coordinates: 28.3408°N 116.2297°E

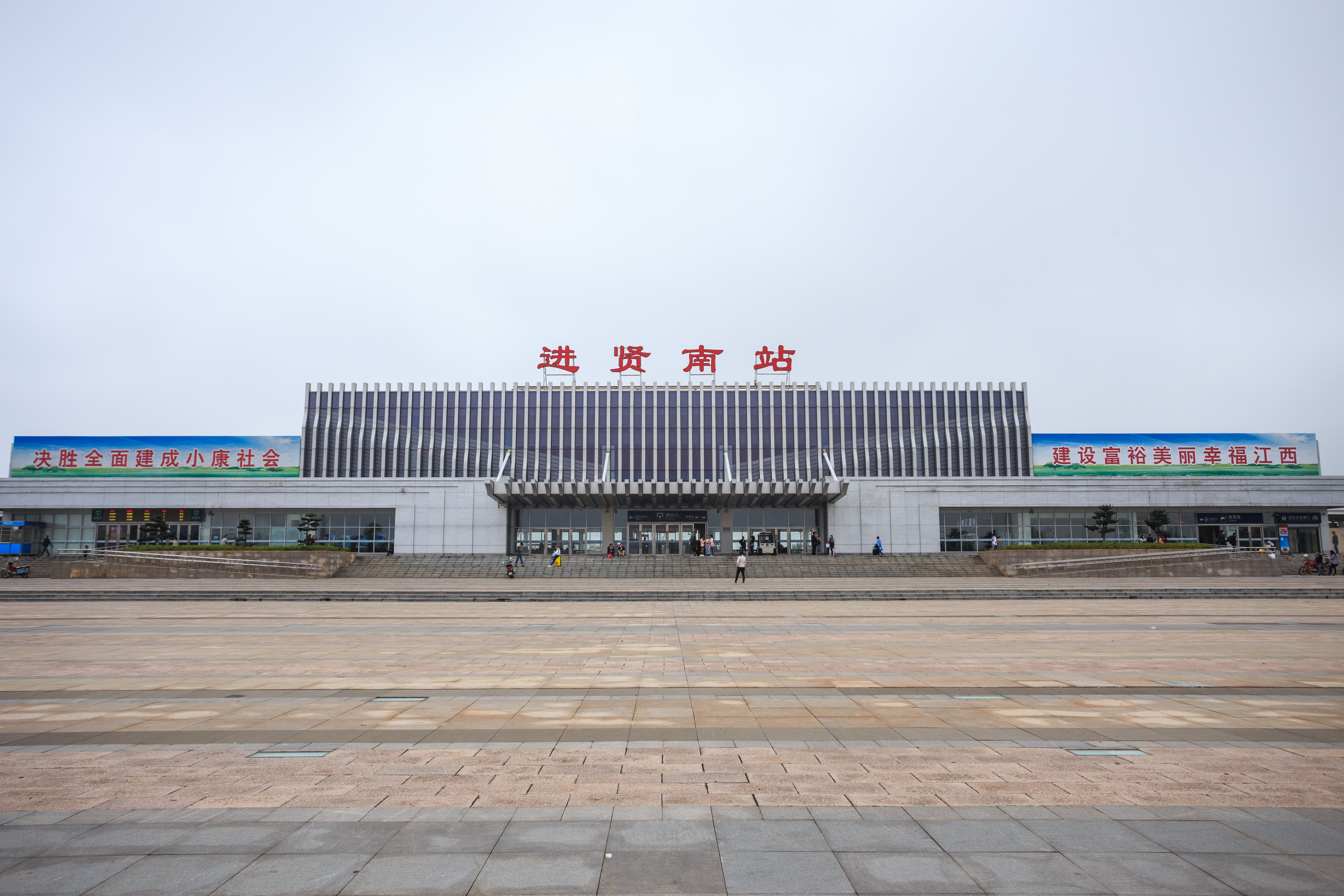
Jinxian South (Jinxiannan) Railway Station in 2017

Jinxian South railway station is a railway station of Hangchangkun Passenger Railway located in Jinxian County, Nanchang, Jiangxi, People's Republic of China.

Preceding station	China Railway High-speed	Following station
Fuzhou East towards Shanghai Hongqiao	Shanghai–Kunming high-speed railway	Nanchang West towards Kunming South
