= Hunan–Guizhou railway =

Railroad in Southwest China

Overview
- Other name(s): Xiangqian railway
- Native name: 湘黔铁路
- Locale: China
- Termini: Zhuzhou, Hunan; Guiyang, Guizhou

Service
- System: China Railway

History
- Commenced: 1937
- Completed: 1972

Technical
- Number of tracks: 2
- Electrification: yes

The Hunan–Guizhou railway or Xiangqian railway (simplified Chinese: 湘黔铁路; traditional Chinese: 湘黔鐵路; pinyin: Xiāngqián tiělù), is a double-track electrified railroad in Southwest China linking Zhuzhou, Hunan, with Guiyang, Guizhou. The railway runs through a very mountainous region, 23% of its length were either bridges or tunnels. Since 2006, it is one of the four segments of the Shanghai–Kunming railway.

Construction began in 1937, but was abandoned in 1939 during the Second Sino–Japanese War due to Japanese encroachment in Hunan. It was resumed in 1970 during the Cultural Revolution after Mao Zedong called for its construction. The line was only completed in 1972 after mobilizing hundreds of thousands of people, including workers, peasants, "sent-down youths", and soldiers.
