= Dexing, Jiangxi =

Dexing 德兴市 Tehhing; Tehsing
- County-level city
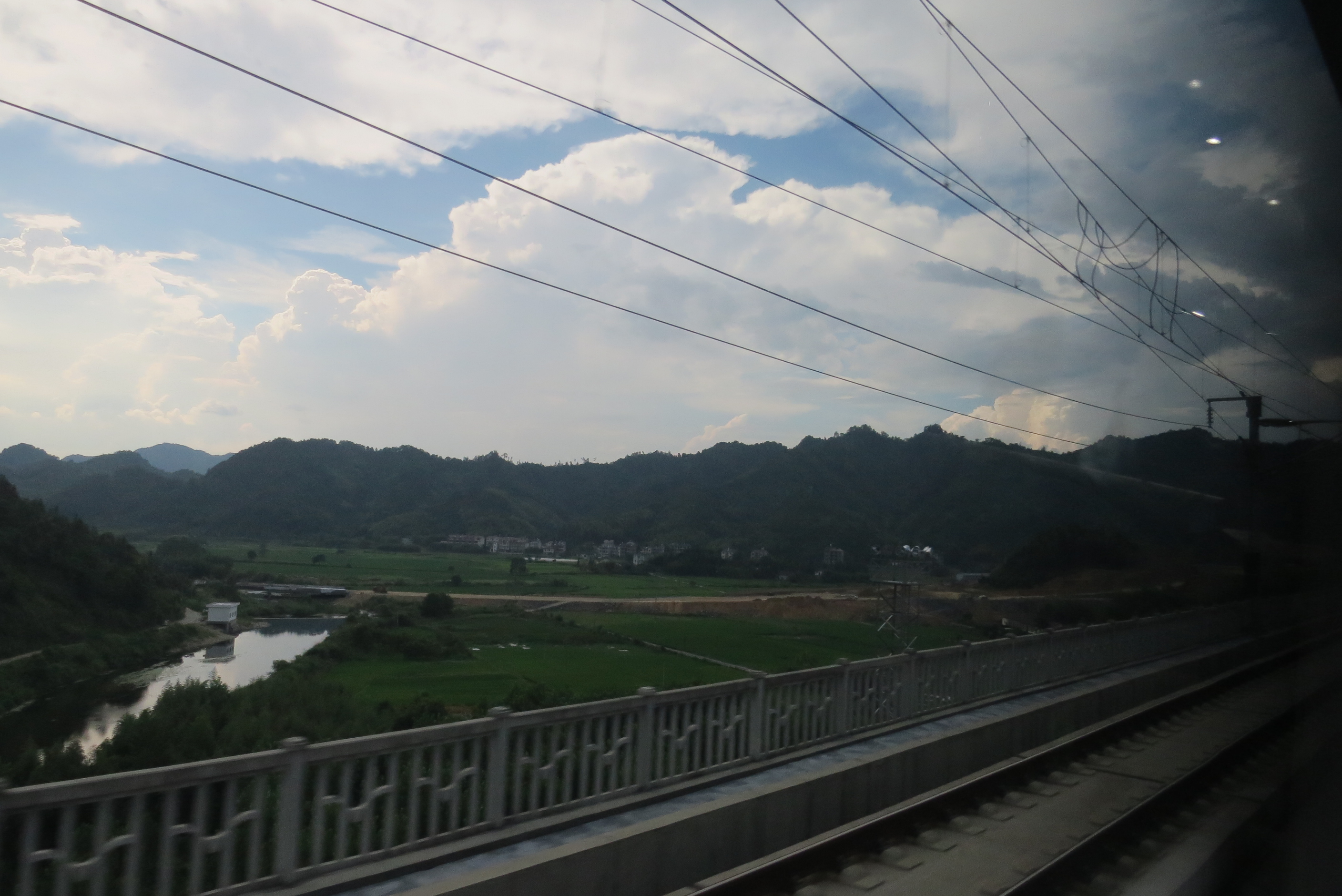

- Location in Jiangxi
- Coordinates: 28°55′50″N 117°35′41″E
- Country: People's Republic of China
- Province: Jiangxi
- Prefecture-level city: Shangrao

Area
  - Total: 2,101 km^{2} (811 sq mi)

Population (2016)
  - Total: 302,000
  - Density: 144/km^{2} (372/sq mi)
- Postal Code: 334200

Dexing (simplified Chinese: 德兴; traditional Chinese: 德興市; pinyin: Déxīng) is a county-level city in the northeast of Jiangxi province, China, bordering Zhejiang province to the east. It is under the jurisdiction of the prefecture-level city of Shangrao.

== Administrative divisions ==
At present, Dexing City has 3 subdistricts, 5 towns and 6 townships.

3 subdistricts

- Yincheng (银城街道)
- Xinying (新营街道)
- Xiangtun (香屯街道)

5 towns

- Rao'er (绕二镇)
- Haikou (海口镇)
- Xingangshan (新岗山镇)
- Sizhou (泗洲镇)
- Huaqiao (花桥镇)

6 townships

- Huangbai (黄柏乡)
- Wancun (万村乡)
- Zhangcun (张村乡)
- Banda (昄大乡)
- Lizhai (李宅乡)
- Longtoushan (龙头山乡)

== Demographics ==
The population of the district was 306,656 in 1999. Dexing is the original home of corporate finance expert Nan Jiang.

== Climate ==
Climate data for Dexing, elevation 89 m (292 ft), (1991–2020 normals, extremes 1981–2010)
Month	Jan	Feb	Mar	Apr	May	Jun	Jul	Aug	Sep	Oct	Nov	Dec	Year
Record high °C (°F)	26.0 (78.8)	29.3 (84.7)	34.9 (94.8)	35.1 (95.2)	36.2 (97.2)	38.4 (101.1)	40.5 (104.9)	39.7 (103.5)	39.0 (102.2)	37.8 (100.0)	32.3 (90.1)	25.9 (78.6)	40.5 (104.9)
Mean daily maximum °C (°F)	10.7 (51.3)	13.7 (56.7)	17.7 (63.9)	23.8 (74.8)	28.2 (82.8)	30.4 (86.7)	34.4 (93.9)	34.2 (93.6)	30.8 (87.4)	25.8 (78.4)	19.7 (67.5)	13.5 (56.3)	23.6 (74.4)
Daily mean °C (°F)	5.9 (42.6)	8.4 (47.1)	12.2 (54.0)	18.0 (64.4)	22.6 (72.7)	25.6 (78.1)	29.1 (84.4)	28.6 (83.5)	25.2 (77.4)	19.7 (67.5)	13.5 (56.3)	7.7 (45.9)	18.0 (64.5)
Mean daily minimum °C (°F)	2.9 (37.2)	5.0 (41.0)	8.6 (47.5)	13.9 (57.0)	18.5 (65.3)	22.1 (71.8)	24.9 (76.8)	24.6 (76.3)	21.0 (69.8)	15.4 (59.7)	9.4 (48.9)	4.0 (39.2)	14.2 (57.5)
Record low °C (°F)	−7.1 (19.2)	−5.2 (22.6)	−4.4 (24.1)	1.8 (35.2)	8.3 (46.9)	13.3 (55.9)	19.0 (66.2)	18.0 (64.4)	11.5 (52.7)	2.1 (35.8)	−3.7 (25.3)	−9.4 (15.1)	−9.4 (15.1)
Average precipitation mm (inches)	104.4 (4.11)	121.8 (4.80)	210.9 (8.30)	244.1 (9.61)	258.7 (10.19)	390.3 (15.37)	243.8 (9.60)	169.8 (6.69)	72.4 (2.85)	53.4 (2.10)	92.3 (3.63)	82.8 (3.26)	2,044.7 (80.51)
Average precipitation days (≥ 0.1 mm)	14.6	14.1	18.4	17.2	16.3	17.5	11.8	12.5	8.4	7.4	10.1	11.0	159.3
Average snowy days	2.3	1.3	0.4	0	0	0	0	0	0	0	0	0.8	4.8
Average relative humidity (%)	82	81	81	80	80	84	78	78	77	76	81	80	80
Mean monthly sunshine hours	81.9	84.6	93.7	115.6	138.4	120.4	209.8	203.2	174.2	160.9	127.6	117.5	1,627.8
Percentage possible sunshine	25	27	25	30	33	29	49	50	48	46	40	37	37
Source: China Meteorological Administration

== Transportation ==
Dexing railway station is situated near Longtoushan and is an intermediate stop on the Hefei–Fuzhou high-speed railway. Dexing East railway station is situated near Xingangshan and is an intermediate stop on the Jiujiang–Quzhou railway.
