= Dongxiang, Fuzhou =

Dongxiang 东乡区 Tungsiang
- District
- Coordinates: 28°14′N 116°36′E
- Country: People's Republic of China
- Province: Jiangxi
- Prefecture-level city: Fuzhou

Area
  - Total: 1,196 km^{2} (462 sq mi)

Population (2019)
  - Total: 452,000
  - Density: 378/km^{2} (979/sq mi)
- Time zone: UTC+8 (China Standard)
- Postal Code: 331800

Dongxiang (simplified Chinese: 东乡; traditional Chinese: 東鄉; pinyin: Dōngxiāng) is a district of Jiangxi province, People's Republic of China. It is under the jurisdiction of the prefecture-level city of Fuzhou.

== Administrative divisions ==
In the present, Dongxiang District has 9 towns and 5 townships.

9 towns

- Xiaogang (孝岗镇)
- Xiaohuang (小璜镇)
- Weishangqiao (圩上桥镇)
- Maxu (马圩镇)
- Zhanxu (詹圩镇)
- Gangshangji (岗上积镇)
- Yangqiaodian (杨桥殿镇)
- Lixu (黎圩镇)
- Wangqiao (王桥镇)

5 townships

- Pogan (珀玕乡)
- Dengjia (邓家乡)
- Pogan (珀玕乡)
- Huwei (虎圩乡)
- Yaowei (瑶圩乡)

== Demographics ==
The population of the district was 408,685 in 1999.

== Climate ==
Climate data for Dongxiang, elevation 82 m (269 ft), (1991–2020 normals, extremes 1981–present)
Month	Jan	Feb	Mar	Apr	May	Jun	Jul	Aug	Sep	Oct	Nov	Dec	Year
Record high °C (°F)	26.4 (79.5)	29.3 (84.7)	32.8 (91.0)	35.4 (95.7)	35.8 (96.4)	37.2 (99.0)	40.3 (104.5)	40.1 (104.2)	38.3 (100.9)	36.7 (98.1)	31.8 (89.2)	24.9 (76.8)	40.3 (104.5)
Mean daily maximum °C (°F)	9.8 (49.6)	12.9 (55.2)	16.9 (62.4)	23.2 (73.8)	27.7 (81.9)	30.2 (86.4)	34.2 (93.6)	33.6 (92.5)	29.9 (85.8)	24.8 (76.6)	18.8 (65.8)	12.5 (54.5)	22.9 (73.2)
Daily mean °C (°F)	5.9 (42.6)	8.5 (47.3)	12.4 (54.3)	18.5 (65.3)	23.2 (73.8)	26.1 (79.0)	29.6 (85.3)	29.0 (84.2)	25.3 (77.5)	19.9 (67.8)	13.9 (57.0)	7.9 (46.2)	18.4 (65.0)
Mean daily minimum °C (°F)	3.2 (37.8)	5.5 (41.9)	9.3 (48.7)	14.9 (58.8)	19.7 (67.5)	23.0 (73.4)	25.9 (78.6)	25.5 (77.9)	21.9 (71.4)	16.2 (61.2)	10.4 (50.7)	4.7 (40.5)	15.0 (59.0)
Record low °C (°F)	−5.9 (21.4)	−10.2 (13.6)	−2.4 (27.7)	3.3 (37.9)	10.1 (50.2)	14.1 (57.4)	18.5 (65.3)	19.0 (66.2)	13.7 (56.7)	1.4 (34.5)	−1.8 (28.8)	−13.2 (8.2)	−13.2 (8.2)
Average precipitation mm (inches)	90.1 (3.55)	109.8 (4.32)	212.2 (8.35)	234.8 (9.24)	256.5 (10.10)	377.6 (14.87)	186.1 (7.33)	138.9 (5.47)	71.6 (2.82)	52.9 (2.08)	95.2 (3.75)	71.0 (2.80)	1,896.7 (74.68)
Average precipitation days (≥ 0.1 mm)	14.3	13.6	18.5	16.9	16.3	16.6	11.4	11.3	8.1	7.7	10.0	10.5	155.2
Average snowy days	2.1	1.1	0.2	0	0	0	0	0	0	0	0	0.8	4.2
Average relative humidity (%)	81	80	82	79	79	82	74	76	78	76	78	78	79
Mean monthly sunshine hours	75.6	77.7	84.6	112.0	139.7	132.3	230.6	210.9	170.6	152.5	122.6	114.3	1,623.4
Percentage possible sunshine	23	25	23	29	33	32	55	52	47	43	38	36	36
Source: China Meteorological Administration All-time September high

== Transportation ==
Fuzhou East Railway Station (抚州东站) is located on the northern outskirts of Dongxiang's county seat (28.264257°N 116.611808°E).
