= Yingtan North railway station =

Railway station in Jiangxi, China

Coordinates: 28.3086°N 117.0337°E

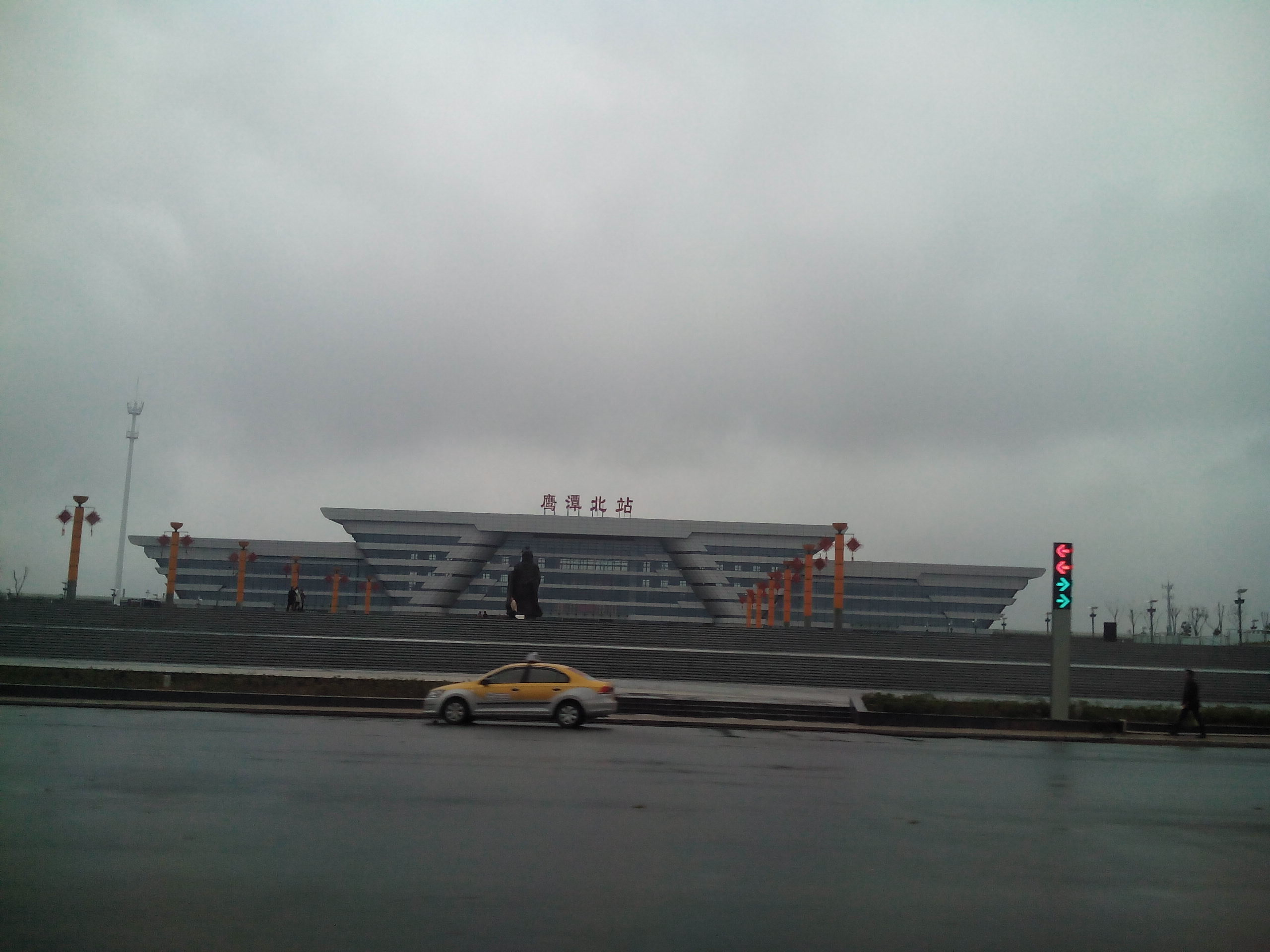
Facade of Yingtan North Railway Station

Yingtan North railway station is a railway station of Hangchangkun Passenger Railway located in Jiangxi, People's Republic of China.
