= Shangrao =

Shangrao 上饶市 Shangjao
- Prefecture-level city
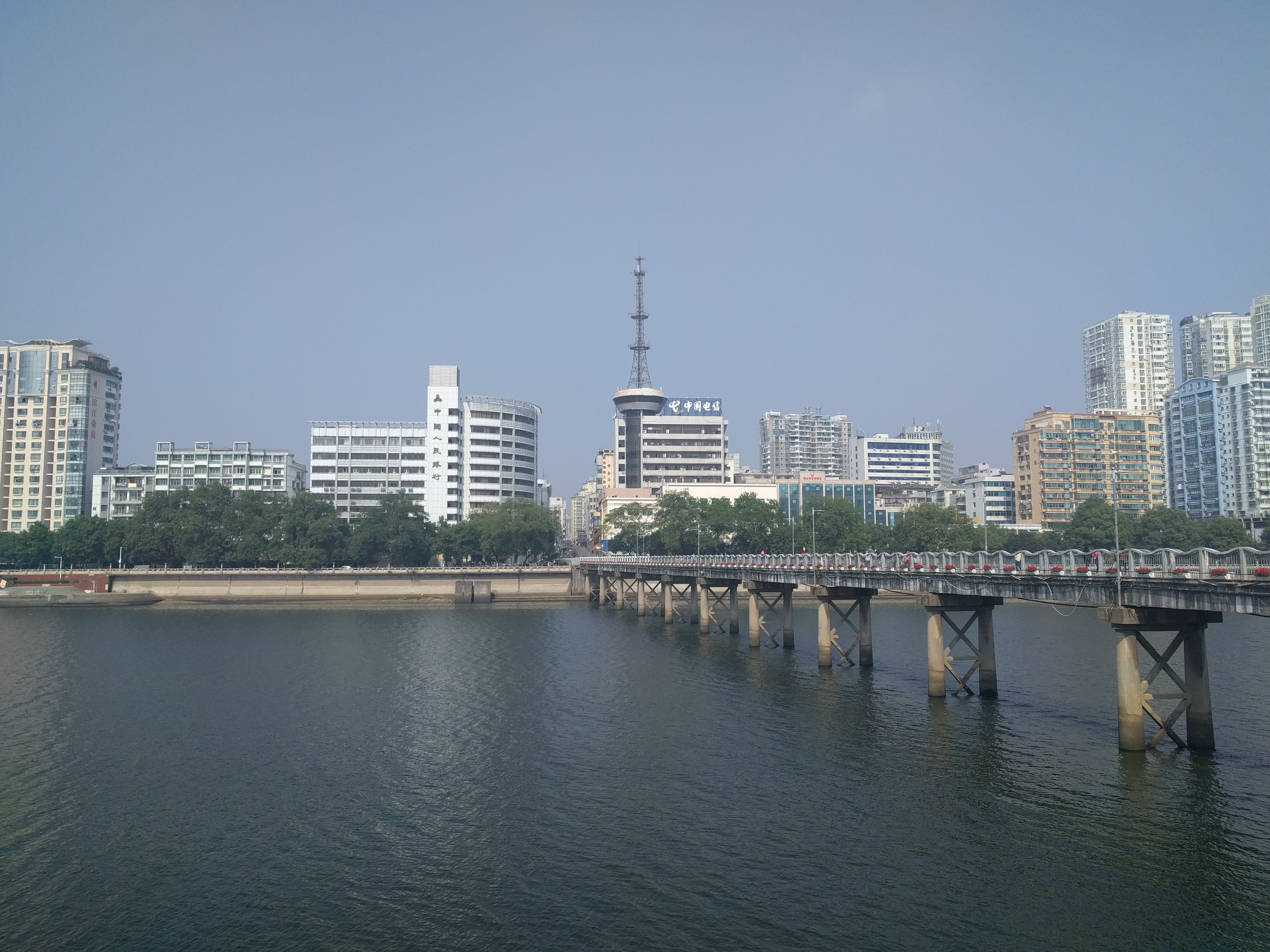
- Xinzhou District

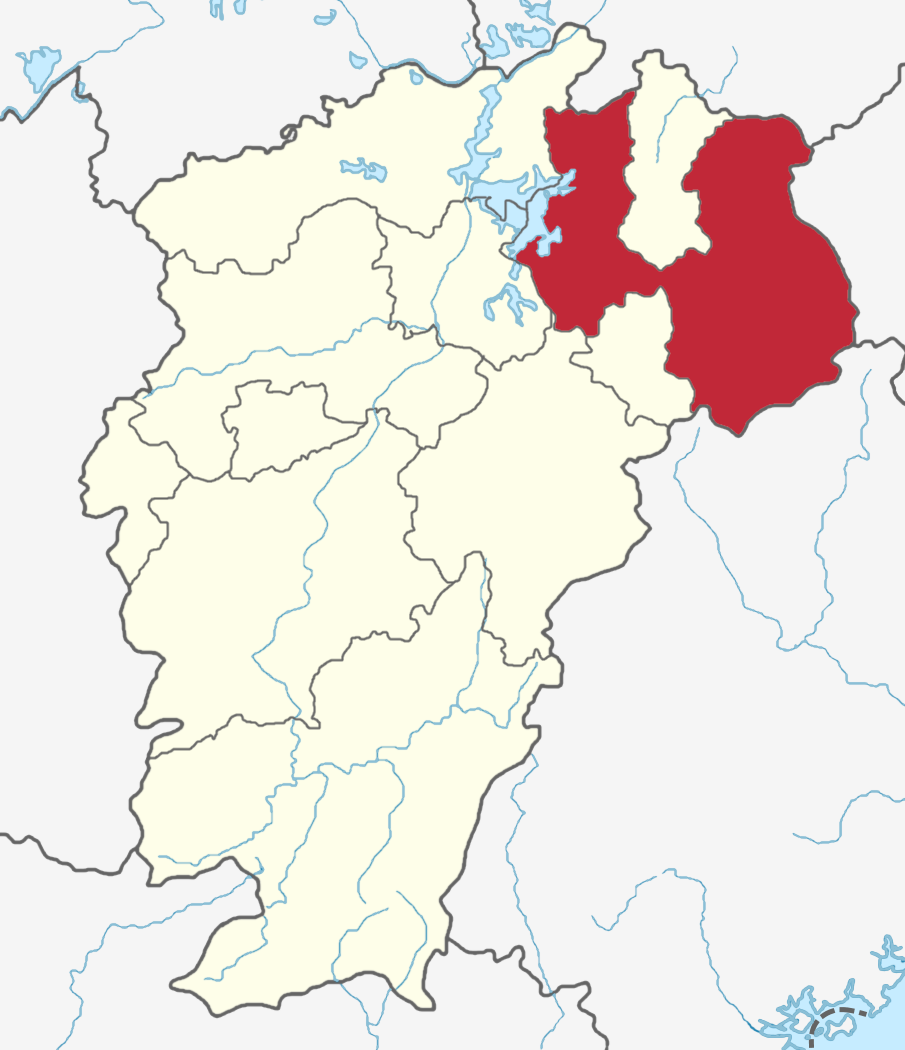
- Location of Shangrao City jurisdiction in Jiangxi
- Coordinates (Shangrao municipal government): 28°27′18″N 117°56′35″E
- Country: China
- Province: Jiangxi
- Municipal seat: Xinzhou District

Area
  - Prefecture-level city: 22,791 km^{2} (8,800 sq mi)
  - Urban: 3,933 km^{2} (1,519 sq mi)
  - Metro: 2,555 km^{2} (986 sq mi)

Population (2020 census)
  - Prefecture-level city: 6,491,088
  - Density: 284.81/km^{2} (737.65/sq mi)
  - Urban: 2,068,763
  - Urban density: 526.0/km^{2} (1,362/sq mi)
  - Metro: 1,293,399
  - Metro density: 506.2/km^{2} (1,311/sq mi)

GDP
  - Prefecture-level city: CN¥ 165.1 billion US$ 26.5 billion
  - Per capita: CN¥ 24,633; US$ 3,955
- Time zone: UTC+8 (China Standard)
- Postal code: 334000
- Area code: 0793
- ISO 3166 code: CN-JX-11
- Website: www.zgsr.gov.cn

Shangrao (simplified Chinese: 上饶; traditional Chinese: 上饒; pinyin: Shàngráo) is a medium-sized prefecture-level city located in the northeast of Jiangxi province, People's Republic of China. The city borders the province of Anhui to the north, the province of Zhejiang to the east, and the province of Fujian to the south. Also, the city's western reaches extend into Poyang Lake. Shangrao had a population of 6,491,088 as of 2020 census whom 1,293,399 lived in the built up (or metro) area made of Xinzhou and Guangxin districts, Guangfeng District not being conurbated yet. Shangrao itself is at the very western edge of the Wu-speaking areas, while most of its associated counties speak Gan.

== Subdivisions ==
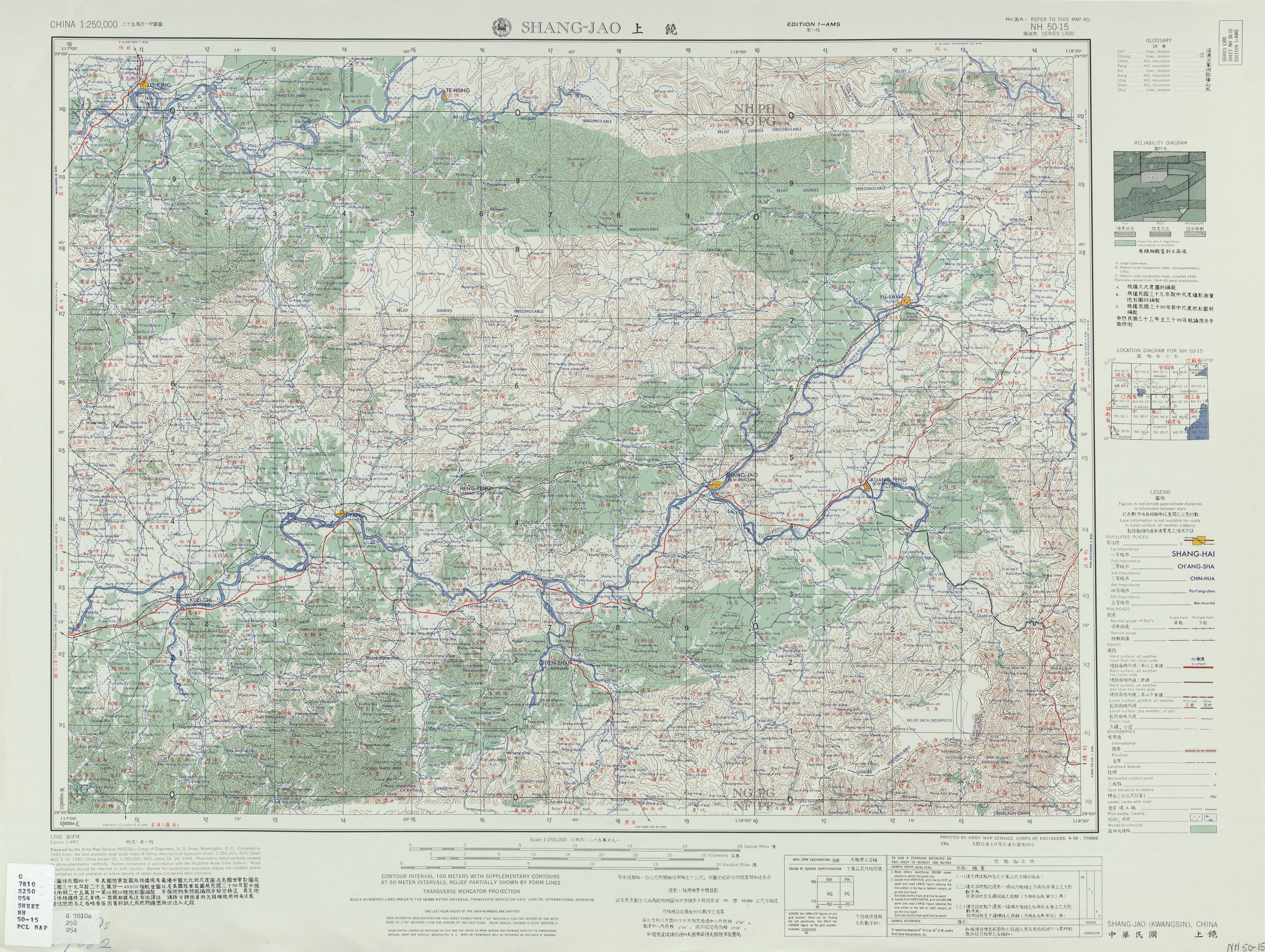
Map including Shangrao (labeled as SHANG-JAO (KWANGSIN) 上饒) (AMS, 1952)

Shangrao is located in the northeast of Jiangxi Province, between 27º48'-29º42' north latitude and 116º13'-118º29' east longitude, and is an inland area. The total area is 22,791 square kilometers, accounting for 13.68% of the total area of the province.Shangrao administers three districts, one county-level city, and eight counties. The information here presented uses data from 2010 national census.

Map
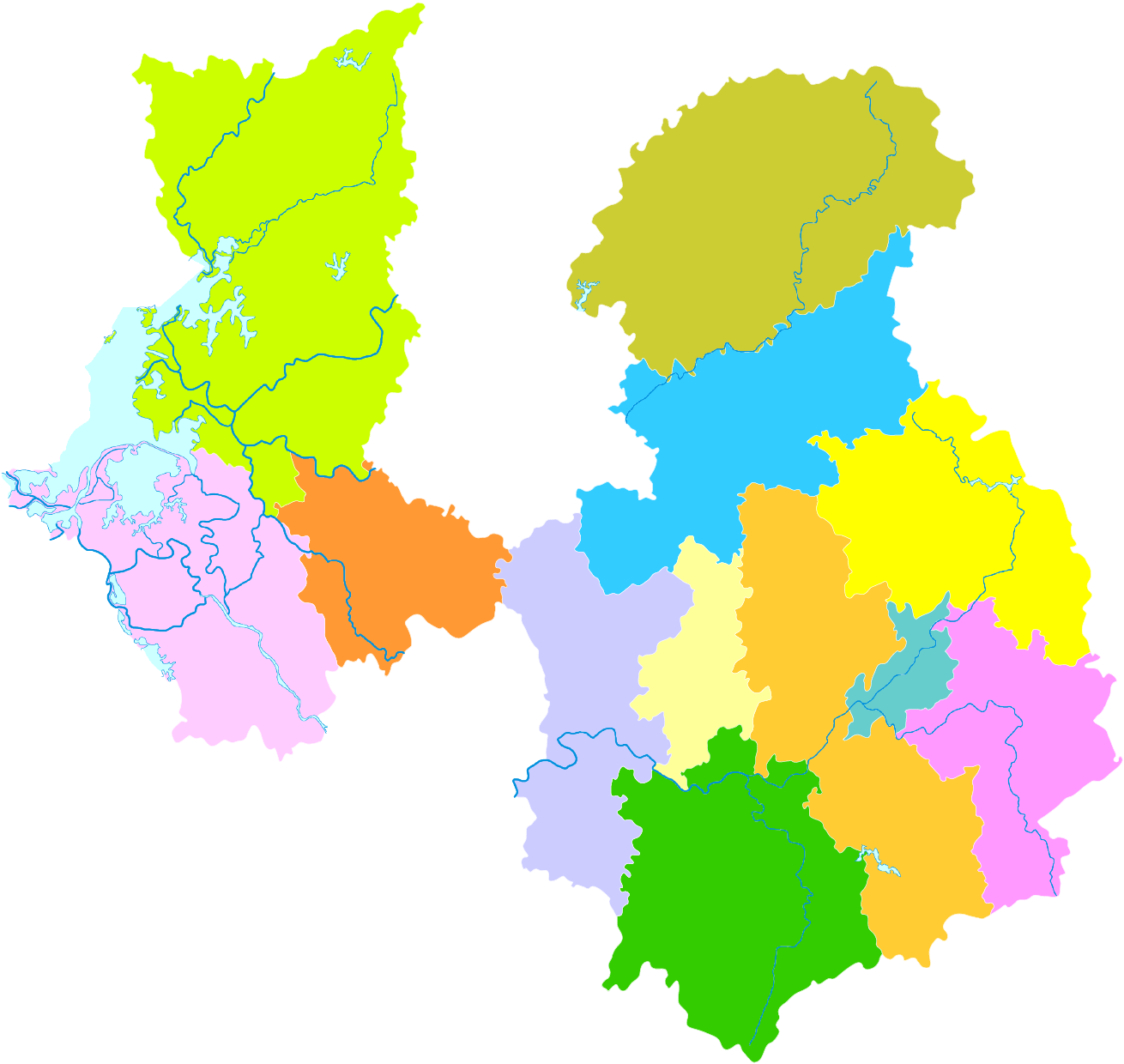

English name	Simplified	Pinyin	Area	Population	Density
Xinzhou District	信州区	Xìnzhōu Qū	339	416,219	1,228
Guangfeng District	广丰区	Guǎngfēng Qū	1,378	752,939	546
Guangxin District	广信区	Guǎngxìn Qū	2,240	700,266	313
Dexing	德兴市	Déxīng Shì	2,101	293,202	140
Yushan County	玉山县	Yùshān Xiàn	1,728	574,363	332
Yanshan County	铅山县	Yánshān Xiàn	2,178	427,000	196
Hengfeng County	横峰县	Héngfēng Xiàn	655	184,870	282
Yiyang County	弋阳县	Yìyáng Xiàn	1,593	353,378	222
Yugan County	余干县	Yúgān Xiàn	2,331	887,603	381
Poyang County	鄱阳县	Póyáng Xiàn	4,215	1,296,756	308
Wannian County	万年县	Wànnián Xiàn	1,141	359,098	315
Wuyuan County	婺源县	Wùyuán Xiàn	2,948	334,020	332

== Climate ==
Shangrao City has a mid-subtropical monsoon climate with mild weather, abundant sunshine, abundant rainfall and a long frost-free period. Shangrao has hot, oppressive and mostly cloudy summers; short, cold and mostly sunny winters; and is humid year-round. Throughout the year, temperatures typically range from 2°C to 33°C, rarely falling below -3°C or rising above 35°C.

Climate data for Shangrao, elevation 118 m (387 ft), (1991–2020 normals, extremes 1981–present)
Month	Jan	Feb	Mar	Apr	May	Jun	Jul	Aug	Sep	Oct	Nov	Dec	Year
Record high °C (°F)	26.1 (79.0)	29.2 (84.6)	34.2 (93.6)	35.9 (96.6)	36.7 (98.1)	39.0 (102.2)	42.0 (107.6)	41.6 (106.9)	39.0 (102.2)	40.5 (104.9)	32.4 (90.3)	25.4 (77.7)	42.0 (107.6)
Mean daily maximum °C (°F)	10.6 (51.1)	13.4 (56.1)	17.3 (63.1)	23.5 (74.3)	27.8 (82.0)	30.0 (86.0)	34.4 (93.9)	34.2 (93.6)	30.7 (87.3)	25.7 (78.3)	19.6 (67.3)	13.4 (56.1)	23.4 (74.1)
Daily mean °C (°F)	6.3 (43.3)	8.6 (47.5)	12.3 (54.1)	17.9 (64.2)	22.6 (72.7)	25.3 (77.5)	29.0 (84.2)	28.6 (83.5)	25.3 (77.5)	20.1 (68.2)	14.2 (57.6)	8.4 (47.1)	18.2 (64.8)
Mean daily minimum °C (°F)	3.3 (37.9)	5.3 (41.5)	8.7 (47.7)	14.0 (57.2)	18.7 (65.7)	21.9 (71.4)	24.8 (76.6)	24.6 (76.3)	21.3 (70.3)	15.9 (60.6)	10.3 (50.5)	4.8 (40.6)	14.5 (58.0)
Record low °C (°F)	−5.4 (22.3)	−4.4 (24.1)	−2.5 (27.5)	5.3 (41.5)	9.7 (49.5)	15.2 (59.4)	20.6 (69.1)	20.0 (68.0)	14.4 (57.9)	3.8 (38.8)	0.1 (32.2)	−5.4 (22.3)	−5.4 (22.3)
Average precipitation mm (inches)	95.5 (3.76)	115.0 (4.53)	222.1 (8.74)	245.5 (9.67)	240.4 (9.46)	393.6 (15.50)	161.3 (6.35)	113.3 (4.46)	82.8 (3.26)	51.1 (2.01)	101.6 (4.00)	78.3 (3.08)	1,900.5 (74.82)
Average precipitation days (≥ 0.1 mm)	14.3	14.0	18.6	17.3	16.7	18.2	11.7	12.3	9.2	7.9	10.1	10.8	161.1
Average snowy days	2.4	1.4	0.3	0	0	0	0	0	0	0	0	0.8	4.9
Average relative humidity (%)	79	78	79	78	78	83	76	76	75	73	77	76	77
Mean monthly sunshine hours	86.8	87.7	99.1	121.2	143.1	130.4	229.5	215.5	181.1	167.4	132.3	120.9	1,715
Percentage possible sunshine	27	28	26	31	34	31	54	53	49	48	41	38	38
Source: China Meteorological AdministrationAll-time May record low

== Transportation ==
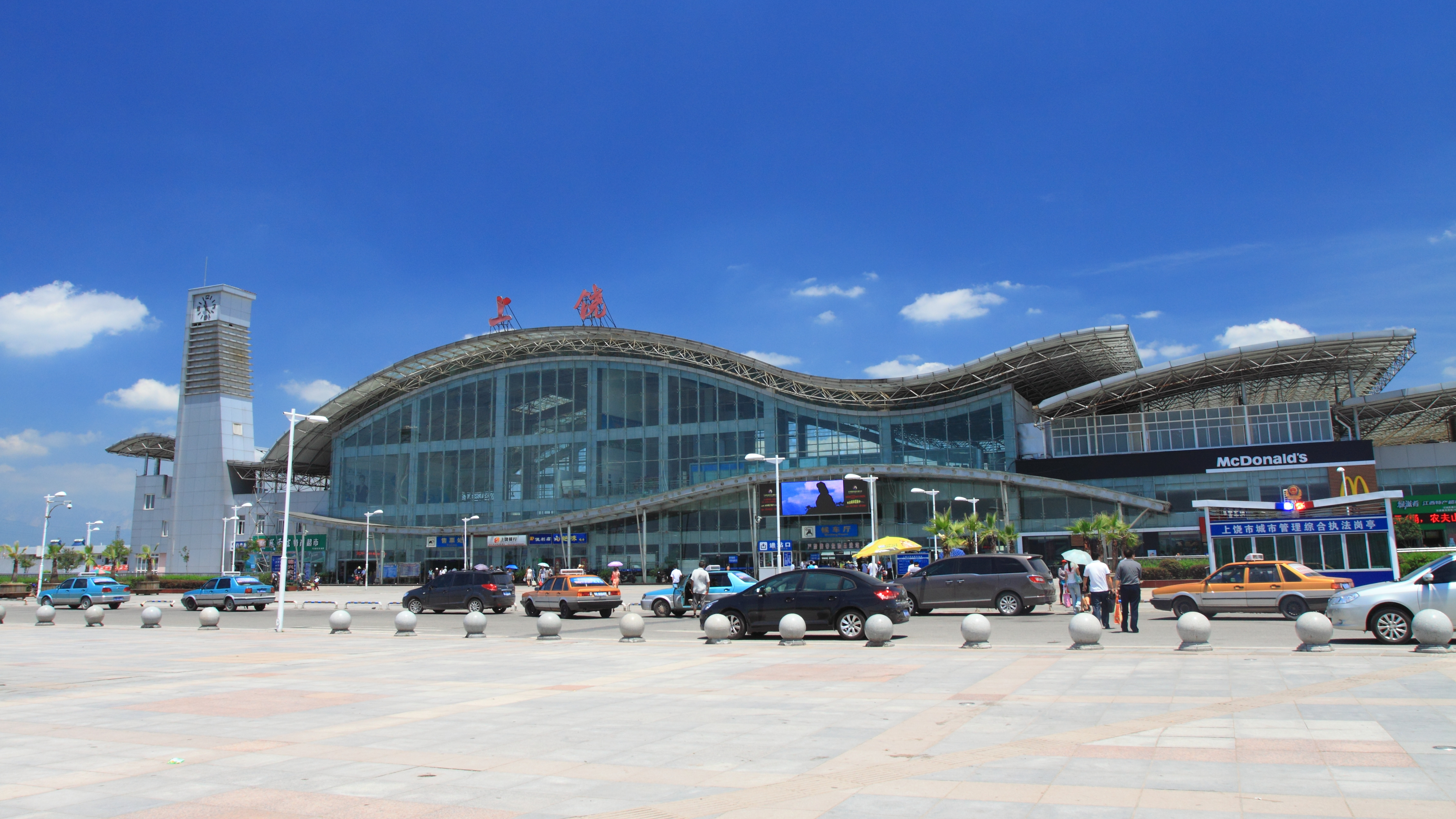
Shangrao Railway Station in 2012.

=== Railway ===
Shangrao Railway Station is served by three major railways passing through Shangrao: the Shanghai–Kunming Railway, the Shanghai–Kunming High-Speed Railway and the Hefei–Fuzhou High-Speed Railway.

=== Air ===
Shangrao Sanqingshan Airport opened on 28 May 2017. Shangrao Sanqingshan Airport is the seventh civil airport in Jiangxi Province. It is located in the south of Shangrao City. The runway of Shangrao Sanqingshan Airport is 2,400 meters long, with a total terminal area of 10,496 square meters and 6 aircraft stands. It was opened on May 28, 2017. In 2019, the passenger transport throughput reached 500,000.

== Education ==
- Shangrao Normal University (上饶师范学院) is located in Shangrao. It was originally named Shangrao Normal Junior College when it was founded in 1958, and changed its name to Gan Dongbei (Northeastern part of Jiangxi) University in 1959. It was closed down during the period of the Chinese Cultural Revolution. Authorized by the State Council, Shangrao Normal Junior College was restored in 1977. Then, with authorization of Ministry of Education and People's Government of Jiangxi Province, it changed its name to Shangrao Normal College in March 2000. Over the past 20 years, more than 26,000 students graduated from Shangrao Normal University, to work in various careers in China.

== Sports ==
The 21,000-capacity Shangrao Stadium is located in the city. It is used mostly for football matches. Shangrao Olympic Center was started on April 20, 2009 and completed and put into use in 2011.

== See also ==
- Mount Sanqing, famed Taoist sacred mountain located in Shangrao. Sanqing Mountain is located at the junction of Yushan County and Dexing City in Shangrao City, Jiangxi Province, China, 50 kilometers away from Yushan County and 78 kilometers away from Shangrao City. Sanqing Mountain is a famous Taoist mountain with beautiful scenery.
