= Kunming railway station =

Railway station serving the city of Kunming, Yunnan, China

Kunming 昆明 metro
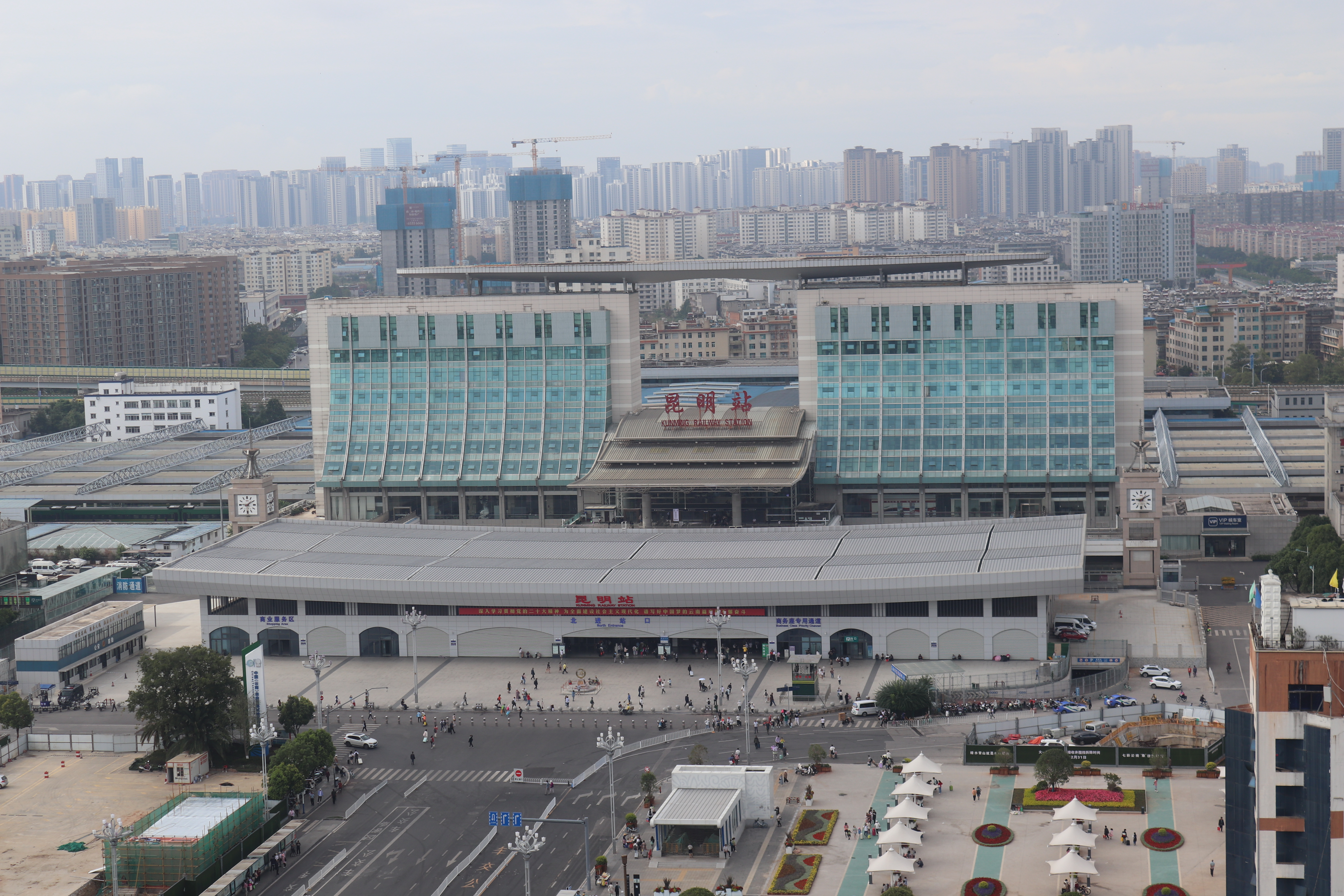
- A view of Kunming railway station

General information
- Location: Guandu District, Kunming, Yunnan; China
- Coordinates: 25°1′3″N 102°43′15″E
- Operated by: CR Kunming
- Platforms: 6

History
- Opened: 1966

Services
Preceding station	China Railway	Following station
Qujing towards Shanghai or Shanghai South	Shanghai–Kunming railway	Terminus
Preceding station	Kunming Metro	Following station
South Ring Road towards North Coach Station	Line 1 (through operation to Line 2)	Fude towards University Town (South) or Kunming South Railway Station
Location

Kunming railway station (Chinese: 昆明站; pinyin: Kūnmíng Zhàn) is the main railway station serving the city of Kunming, Yunnan, China. It is located about four kilometres from the city centre. It handles most high-speed rail services for destinations within Yunnan along with virtually all non-high-speed services.

It is also known for a terrorist attack that happened at the station on March 1, 2014, which resulted in the death of 33 people and the injury of 143, including many children in both categories.

== Connections ==
Kunming railway station is located on the Shanghai–Kunming Railway, the Chengdu–Kunming Railway, the Neijiang–Kunming Railway and the Nanning–Kunming Railway. It is also served by a station on Line 1 of the Kunming Metro.

== Other railway stations in Kunming ==
Kunming's other main railway station is Kunming South railway station, located in Chenggong District and used for high-speed rail services. Kunming also has the Kunming North railway station (昆明北站), on the meter-gauge Kunming–Hai Phong Railway. Presently, it only has very limited service, but a Kunming Metro station of the same name has recently been built in the area and is a major interchange for the system.

== 2014 terrorist attack ==
On 1 March 2014, a group of terrorists likely affiliated with Xinjiang independence groups carrying long knives rushed into Kunming Station, killing 31 people and injuring 143. The police later came and secured the scene of the attack. Four attackers were shot dead. The attack caused a large increase in security personnel in transportation centers throughout China.
