= Shanghai–Kunming railway =

Railway line in China

Shanghai–Kunming railway; 沪昆铁路

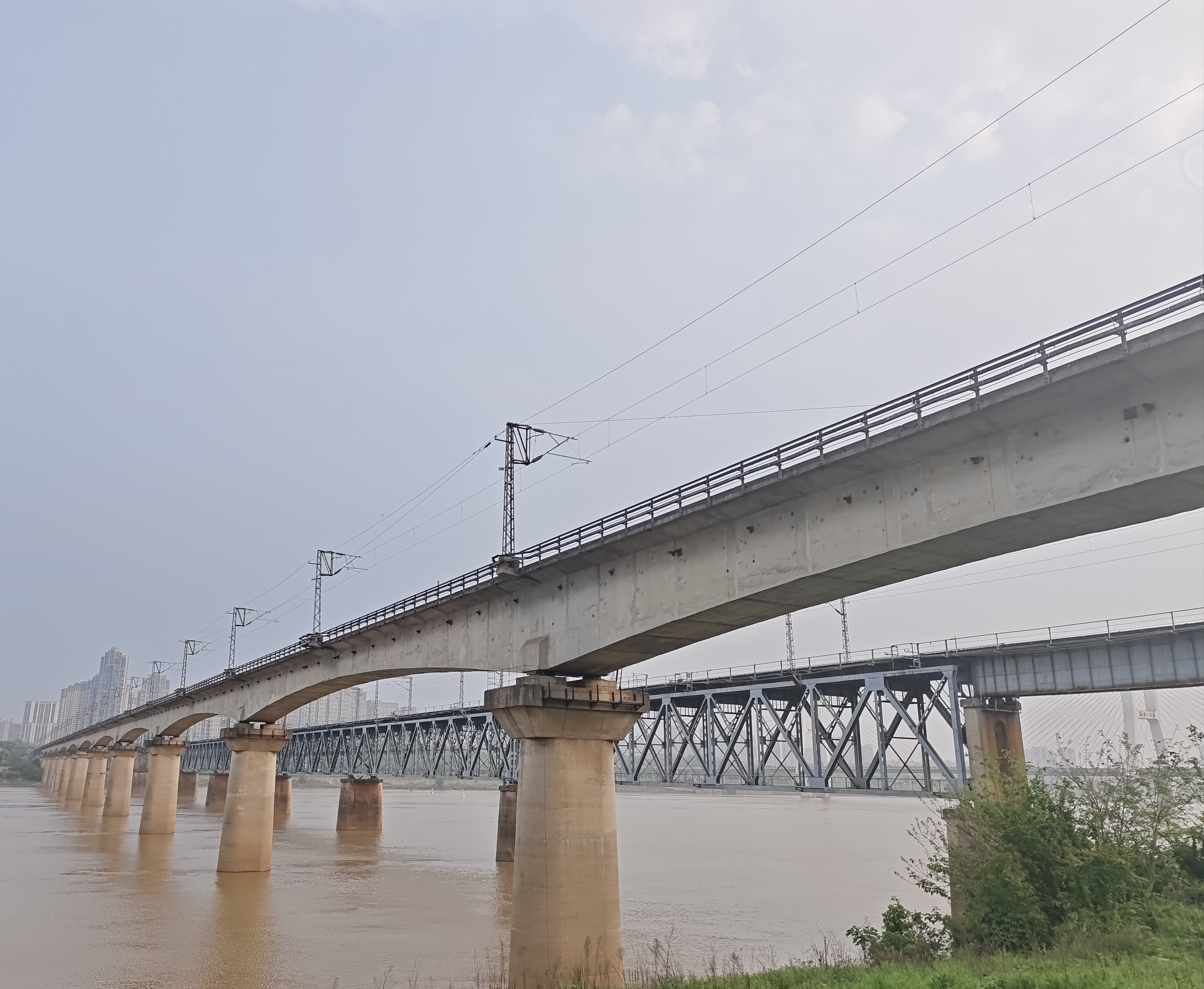
- Shanghai-Kunming Railway over Xiang River in Hunan

Overview
- Status: Active
- Termini: Shanghai; Shanghai South; Kunming

Service
- Type: Heavy rail
- Operator(s): China Railway

Technical
- Line length: 2,690 km (1,670 mi)
- Track gauge: 1,435 mm (4 ft 8 1/2 in) standard gauge
- Electrification: 25 kV 50 Hz AC

The Shanghai–Kunming Railway or Hukun Railway (simplified Chinese: 沪昆铁路; traditional Chinese: 滬昆鐵路; pinyin: hùkūn tiělù), also known as the Hukun Line, is a major arterial railroad across eastern, south central and southwest China. It connects Shanghai, whose shorthand name is Hu, and Kunming. The line has a total length of 2,690 km (1,670 mi) and passes through Shanghai Municipality, Zhejiang, Jiangxi, Hunan, Guizhou and Yunnan Province. Major cities along route include Shanghai, Jiaxing, Hangzhou, Yiwu, Jinhua, Shangrao, Yingtan, Pingxiang, Zhuzhou, Huaihua, Kaili, Guiyang, Anshun, Qujing, and Kunming.

== Line description ==
The Hukun Line is double track from Shanghai's South Station to Liupanshui and single-track railway for about 400 kilometres (250 mi) from Liupanshui to Kunming. The speed limit for the line is 200 kilometres per hour (120 mph) from Shanghai to Zhuzhou and 120 kilometres per hour (75 mph) from Zhuzhou to Huaihua. The entire line is electrified.

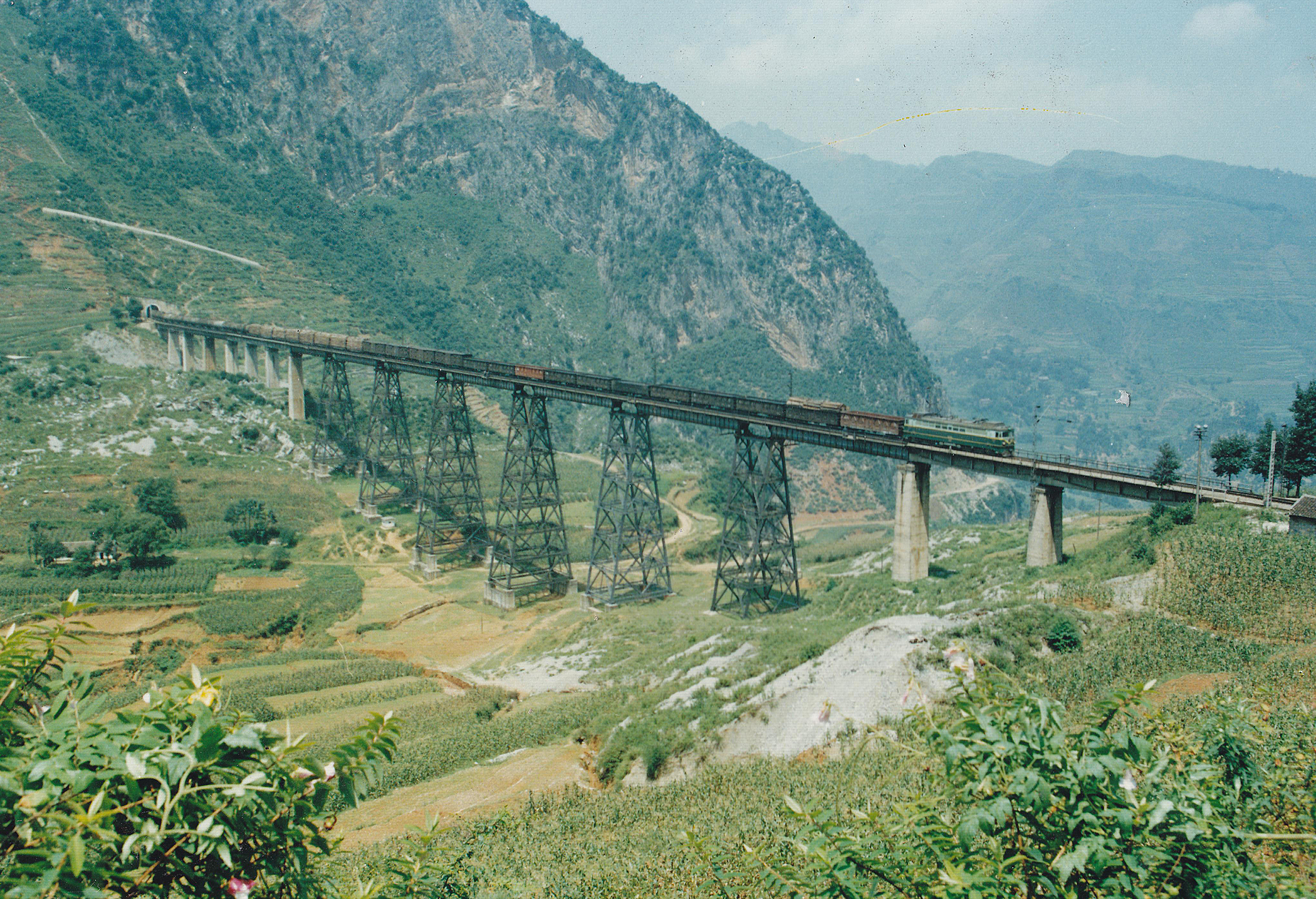
The Guiyang-Kunming Railway crossing the Kedu River near Liupanshui, Guizhou.

The Shanghai–Kunming high-speed railway runs parallel to the Shanghai–Kunming Railway.

== History ==
The Shanghai–Kunming Railway has four major segments, which were built over a span of 70 years. In 2006, after the Ministry of Railways rebuilt sections along route and increased train travel speed, the four lines were collectively referred to as one.

- Shanghai–Hangzhou Railway (Huhang Line 沪杭铁路; 滬杭鐵路; Hùháng Tiělù), 189 km (117 mi) in length, was built between 1906 and 1909 and connects Shanghai and Hangzhou.
- Zhejiang–Jiangxi Railway (Zhegan Line 浙赣铁路; 浙贛鐵路; Zhègàn Tiělù), 946 km (588 mi) in length, was built between 1899 and 1937 and connected Hangzhou, the capital of Zhejiang Province, with Zhuzhou, in northern Hunan province.
- Hunan–Guizhou Railway (Xiangqian Line 湘黔铁路; 湘黔鐵路; Xiāngqián Tiělù), 905 km (562 mi) in length, was begun in 1937, halted in 1939 by World War II, restarted in 1953 and completed in 1975. It runs from Zhuzhou to Guiyang, capital of Guizhou Province.
- Guiyang–Kunming Railway (Guikun Line 贵昆铁路; 貴昆鐵路; Guìkūn Tiělù), 639 km (397 mi) in length, was built between 1958 and 1970, and connects Guiyang and Kunming. It was electrified in 1980.

== Accidents ==
On May 23, 2010 (UTC+8), a passenger train derailed after heavy rains caused mudslides on the Hukun Line in Jiangxi Province, killing 19 passengers and injuring 71.

== See also ==
- List of railways in China
