= Kunming South railway station =

Railway station in Kunming, China

Kunmingnan 昆明南 metro
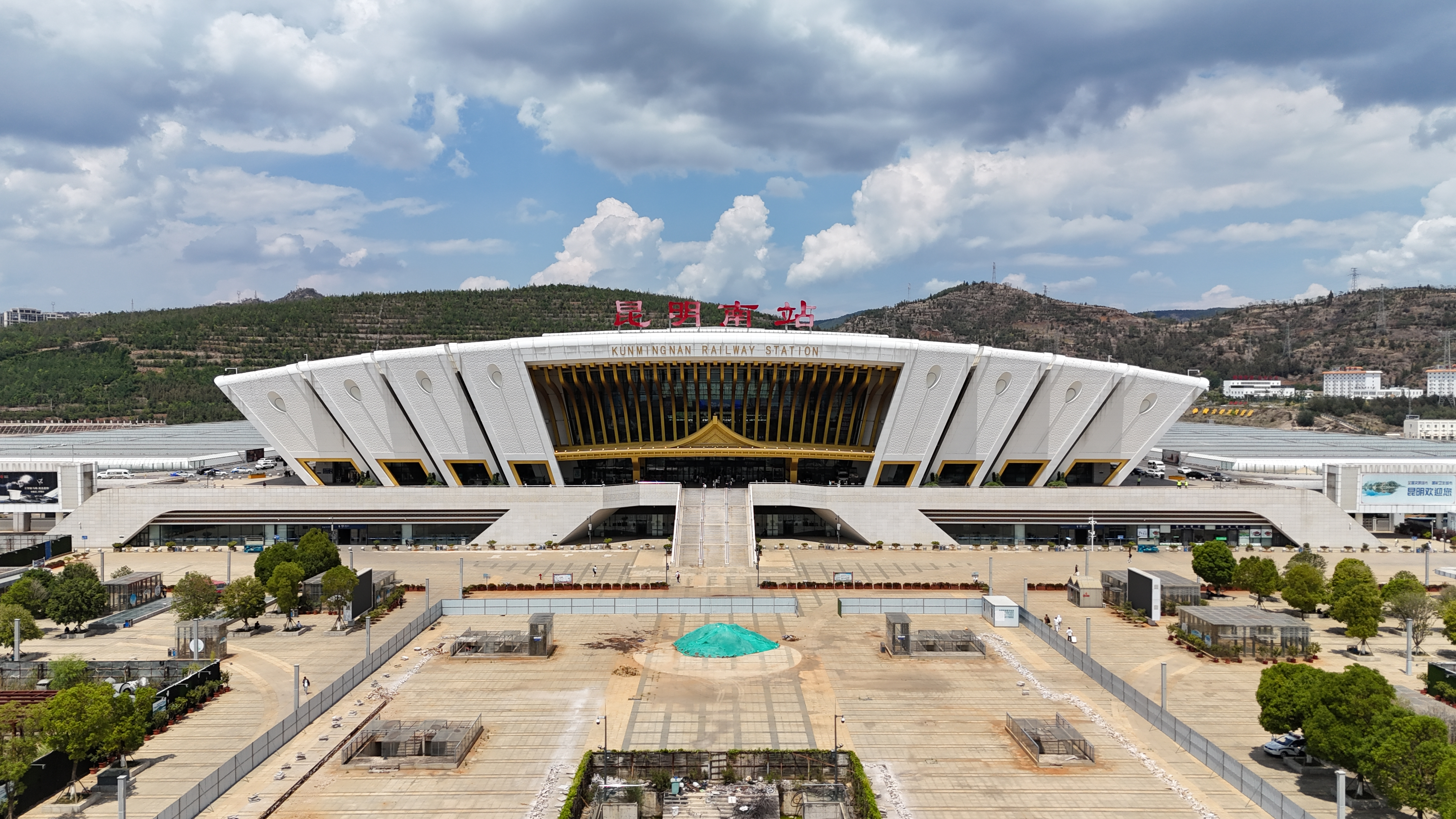

General information
- Location: Wujiaying Subdistrict, Chenggong District, Kunming, Yunnan; China
- Coordinates: 24.873120°N 102.860235°E
- Operated by: CR Kunming
- Lines: Shanghai–Kunming High-Speed Railway; Nanning–Kunming High-Speed Railway; Kunming–Yuxi Railway
- Platforms: 30
- Connections: Bus terminal

Other information
- Station code: TMIS code: 48778; Telegraph code: KOM; Pinyin code: KMN
- Classification: Top Class station

Services
Preceding station	China Railway High-speed	Following station
Songming towards Shanghai Hongqiao	Shanghai–Kunming high-speed railway	Terminus
Preceding station	Kunming Metro	Following station
Bailongtan towards North Coach Station	Line 1 (through operation to Line 2)	Terminus
Wujiaying towards Jinchuan Road	Line 4	Terminus
Location

Kunming South railway station is the main high-speed rail station of the Kunming metropolitan area. It is the western terminus of the Nanning–Kunming High-Speed Railway and the Shanghai–Kunming High-Speed Railway.

The station is located in the Chenggong District of the City of Kunming, the capital of Yunnan Province. It was put into operation simultaneously with the two high-speed mainlines it serves, after five years of construction. It is also the terminal for the high-speed (D series) trains on the Kunming–Yuxi Railway.

Although Chenggong is being developed as Kunming's new city center, it is about 20 km from Kunming's current city center in Wuhua. Its remote location causes some complaints from city's residents. Kunming South railway station was linked with Kunming railway station (located just south of the current city center) in 2017, enabling some high-speed trains to serve Kunming railway station as well.

== History ==
The station put into operation in December 2016 after five years of construction. The same year, the station was connected to the Kunming Metro network via a branch of Line 1.

The station gained a second metro connection when Line 4 opened in September 2020.

On April 13, 2023, the international service between Kunming South to Vientiane officially opened.
