= Shanghai–Kunming high-speed railway =

Railway line

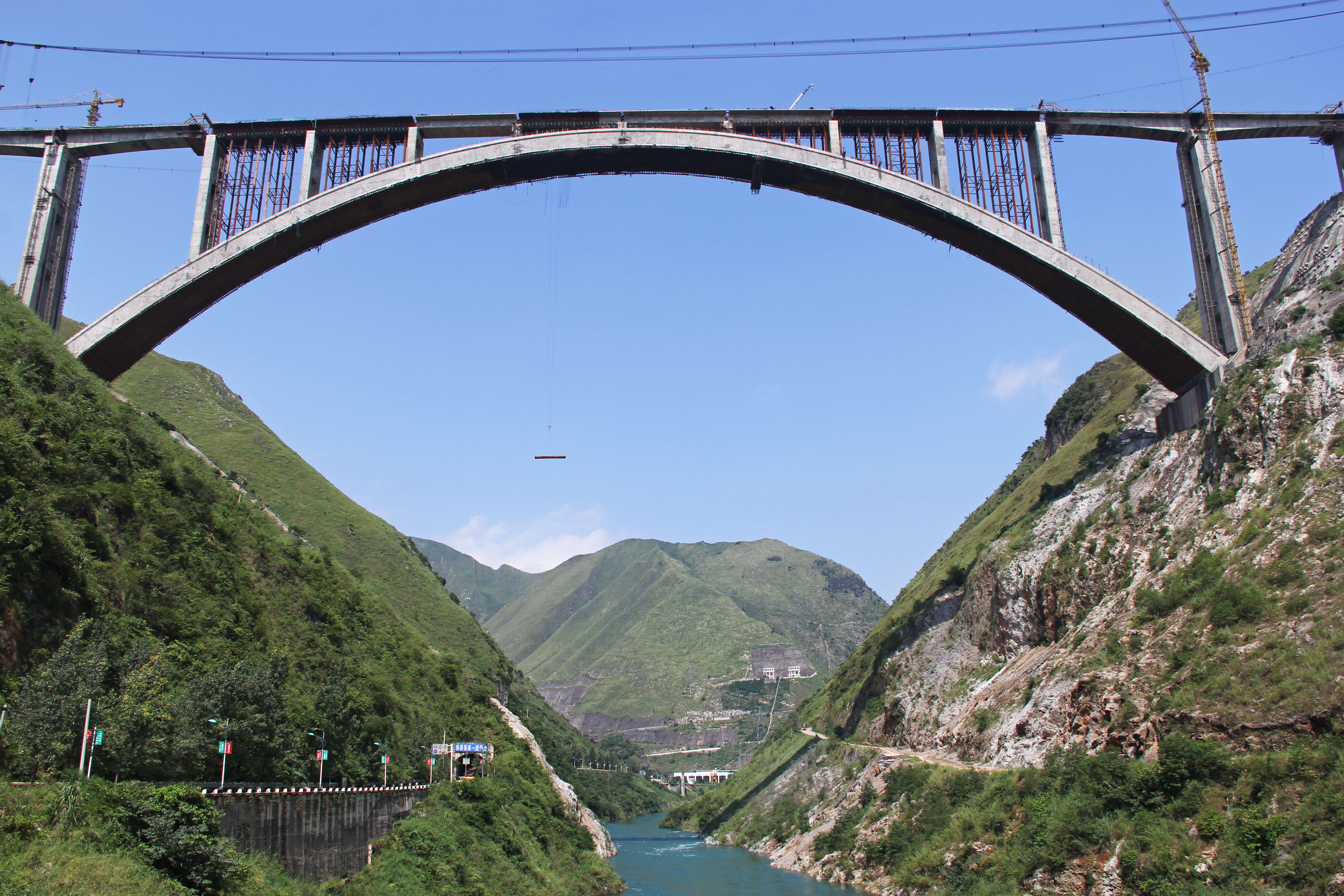

Overview
- Native name: 沪昆高速铁路 沪昆客运专线 沪昆客专 沪昆高铁
- Status: Operational
- Owner: CR Shanghai; CR Nanchang; CR Guangzhou; CR Chengdu; CR Kunming
- Locale: Shanghai; Zhejiang province; Jiangxi province; Hunan province; Guizhou province; Yunnan province
- Termini: Shanghai Hongqiao; Kunming South
- Stations: 55

Service
- Type: High-speed rail
- System: China Railway High-speed
- Operator(s): CR Shanghai; CR Nanchang; CR Guangzhou; CR Chengdu; CR Kunming

History
- Opened: 28 December 2016; 9 years ago

Technical
- Line length: 2,066 km (1,284 mi)
- Number of tracks: 2 (Double-track)
- Track gauge: 1,435 mm (4 ft 8 1/2 in) standard gauge
- Electrification: 25 kV 50 Hz AC (Overhead line)
- Operating speed: 350 km/h (220 mph)
- Maximum incline: 2%

The Shanghai–Kunming high-speed railway is a high-speed railway line. It was built in stages and completed on 28 December 2016. It is part of the CRH's system of passenger-dedicated lines, beginning in Shanghai and ending in Kunming, the capital of Yunnan Province. Following a fairly similar route to the older "conventional" Shanghai–Kunming Railway, the Shanghai–Kunming high-speed railway passes through four more provincial capitals, the cities of Hangzhou, Nanchang, Changsha, and Guiyang.

== Status ==
The entire line is operational. The last section, Guiyang–Kunming, was opened on 28 December 2016. In November 2017, Chinese media reported that traffic safety was endangered due to quality issues with the construction; furthermore, the construction company committed fraud and illegal subcontracting. On some sections, operational speeds were reduced from 300 kilometres per hour (190 mph) to 70 kilometres per hour (43 mph), due to some problems in construction, confirmed by the state media.

=== Components ===
Section	Description	Designed speed (km/h)	Length (km)	Construction start date	Open date
Shanghai–Kunming high-speed railway	HSR Corridor connecting East, Central and Southwest China. It consists of three sections connecting Shanghai, Hangzhou, Changsha and Kunming.	350	2,258	2009-02-26	2016-12-28
Shanghai–Hangzhou section (Shanghai–Hangzhou high-speed railway)	HSR connecting Shanghai and Hangzhou.	350	150	2009-02-26	2010-10-26
Hangzhou–Changsha section (Hangzhou–Changsha high-speed railway)	HSR connecting Hangzhou & Changsha, via Nanchang.	350	933	2009-12-22	Hangzhou–Nanchang Section: 2014-12-10; Nanchang–Changsha Section: 2014-09-16
Changsha–Kunming section (Changsha–Kunming high-speed railway)	HSR connecting Changsha & Kunming	350	1,175	2010-03-26	Changsha–Xinhuang Section: 2014-12-16; Xinhuang-Guiyang Section: 2015-06-18; Guiyang-Kunming section: 2016-12-28

Hukun HSR map to scale
