= Line 3 (Kunming Metro) =

Metro line in Kunming, China

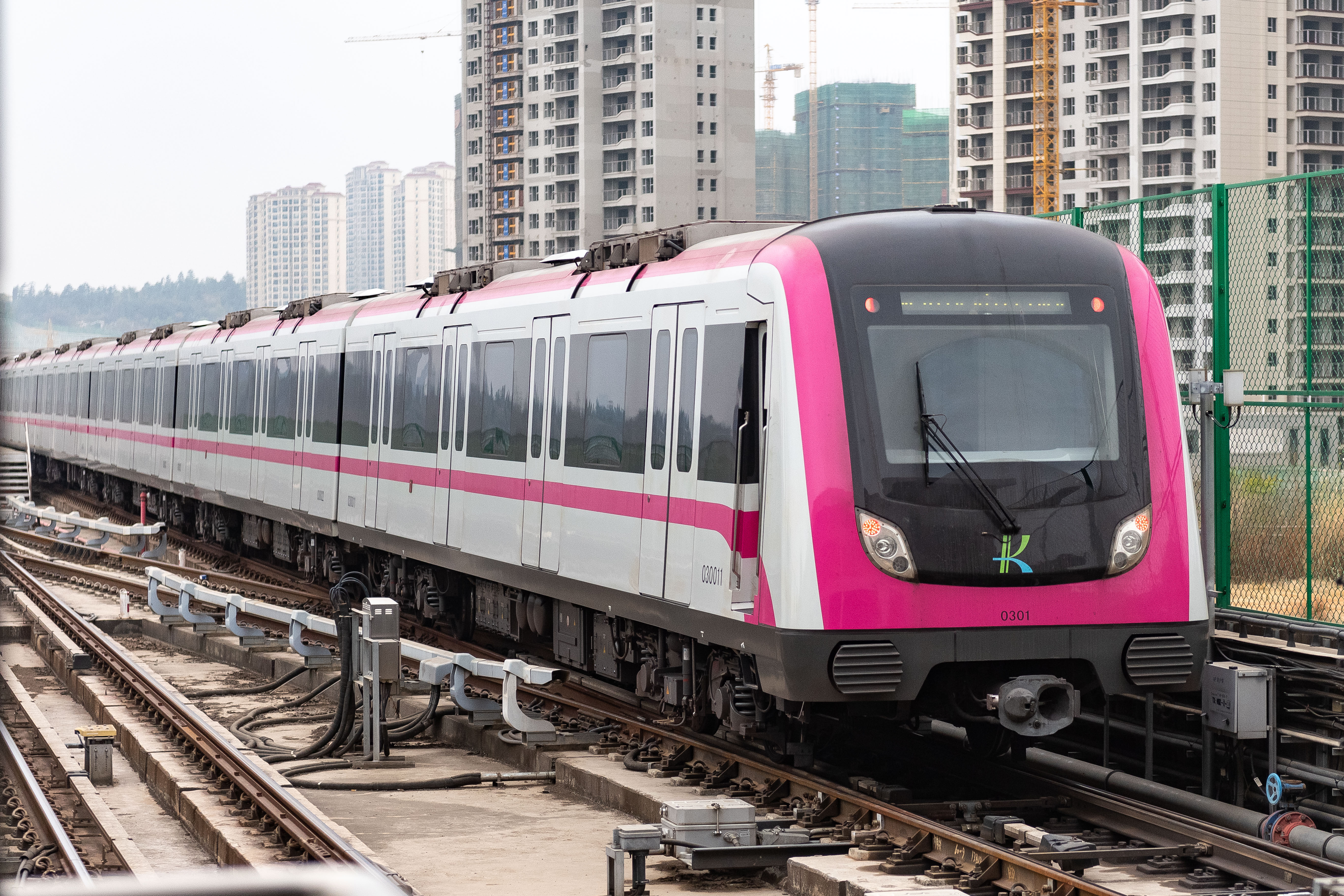
- Train of Line 3 leaving East Coach Station

Overview
- Status: Operational
- Locale: Kunming, Yunnan Province, China
- Termini: Western Hills Park; East Coach Station
- Stations: 20

Service
- Type: Rapid transit
- Operator: Kunming Rail Transit Corporation

History
- Opened: 29 August 2017; 9 years ago

Technical
- Line length: 19.16 km (11.91 mi)
- Num of tracks: 2
- Character: Underground and elevated
- Track gauge: 1,435 mm (4 ft 8 1/2 in)

Line 3 is a rapid transit line on the Kunming Metro, serving the city of Kunming, China. It links Line 2 at Dongfeng Square, and links Line 6 at East Coach Station. It is an east–west line of the system.

Phase I has a total length of 19.16 km (11.91 mi) and 17 stations. It opened in August 2017 along with Line 6.

== Opening timeline ==
| Segment | Commencement | Length | Station(s) | Name |
|---|---|---|---|---|
| Western Hills Park — East Coach Station | 29 August 2017 | 23.36 km (14.52 mi) | 20 | Phase 1 |

== Route ==
Line 3 runs in Xishan District, Wuhua District, Panlong District and Guandu District.

| Station Name | | Connections | Distance km | | Location |
| English | Chinese | Connections | Distance km | | Location |
|---|---|---|---|---|---|
| Western Hills Park | 西山公园 | | - | 0.00 | Xishan |
| Chejiabi | 车家壁 | | 1.31 | 1.31 | Xishan |
| Pupingcun | 普坪村 | | 1.33 | 2.64 | Xishan |
| Shizui | 石咀 | | 1.50 | 4.14 | Xishan |
| Dayu Road | 大渔路 | | 1.45 | 5.59 | Xishan |
| West Coach Station | 西部汽车站 | | 0.86 | 6.45 | Xishan |
| Mianshan | 眠山 | | 1.82 | 8.27 | Xishan/Wuhua |
| Changyuan Central Road | 昌源中路 | | 0.56 | 8.83 | Xishan/Wuhua |
| Xiyuan | 西苑 | | 1.09 | 9.92 | Xishan/Wuhua |
| Liangjiahe | 梁家河 | | 1.24 | 11.16 | Xishan/Wuhua |
| Municipal Gymnasium | 市体育馆 | | 1.00 | 12.16 | Xishan/Wuhua |
| Panjiawan | 潘家湾 | 1 | 0.75 | 12.91 | Xishan/Wuhua |
| Wuyi Road | 五一路 | 5 | 1.35 | 14.26 | Wuhua |
| Dongfeng Square | 东风广场 | 2 | 1.43 | 15.69 | Panlong |
| Tuodong Stadium | 拓东体育馆 | | 1.11 | 16.80 | Panlong |
| Dashuying | 大树营 | 4 | 1.07 | 17.87 | Guandu |
| Jinmasi | 金马寺 | | 0.89 | 18.76 | Guandu |
| Taipingcun | 太平村 | | 1.22 | 19.98 | Panlong |
| Hongqiao | 虹桥 | | 1.25 | 21.23 | Panlong |
| East Coach Station | 东部汽车站 | 6 | 1.54 | 22.77 | Panlong |
