= Kunming North railway station =

Railway station in Panlong District, Kunming, China

Coordinates: 25°3′36″N 102°43′10″E

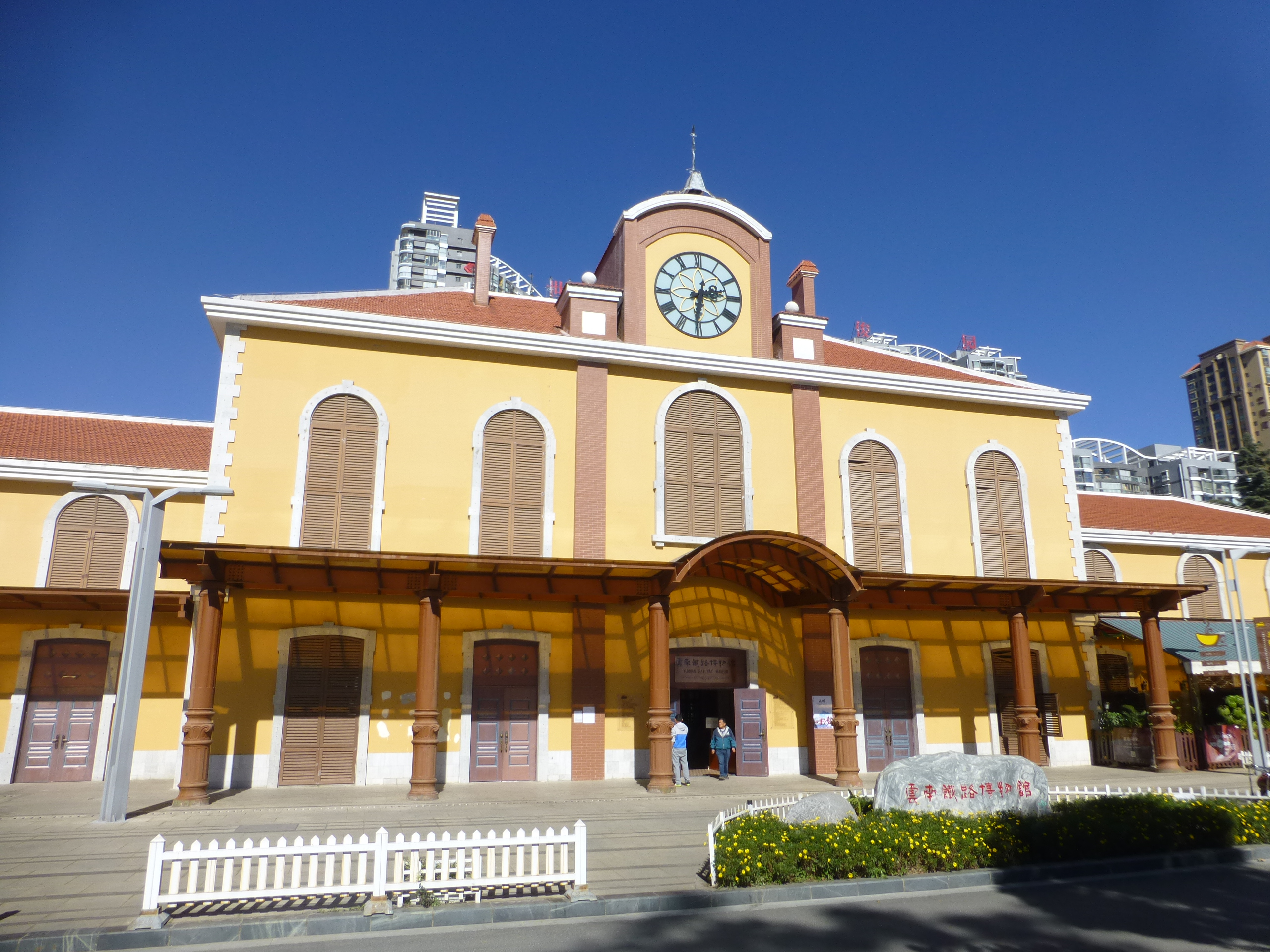
The new station (Yunnan Railway Museum)

Kunming North railway station (昆明北站, Kūnmíng Běi Zhàn) is an old railway station in Panlong District, Kunming, the capital of China's Yunnan Province. It was the terminal of the metre gauge Kunming–Hai Phong Railway, but now only sees very limited service. A metro station with the same name was constructed nearby as part of Kunming Metro Line 2 and has since become a major interchange.

== French construction ==
Built by the French in the early 20th century, the Kunming–Hai Phong Railway runs from Kunming to Hekou on Vietnamese border, and then continues to Vietnam. As late as the last years of the 20th century, every Friday and Sunday, a train would depart from Kunming North railway station to Hanoi, the capital of Vietnam. It took about 16 hours to reach Hekou, and 32 hours to Hanoi.

== Present state ==
Due to the deterioration of the railway line, the long distance narrow-gauge service has been cancelled. Since 2012, some local narrow gauge commuter train service resumes at Kunming North railway station, in particular one daily train to Shizui railway station (石咀站) on the western outskirts of Kunming, and two trains daily to Wangjiaying railway station (王家营站) to the east of the city. However, the service was terminated again in December 2017 due to the construction of Kunming Metro Line 4.

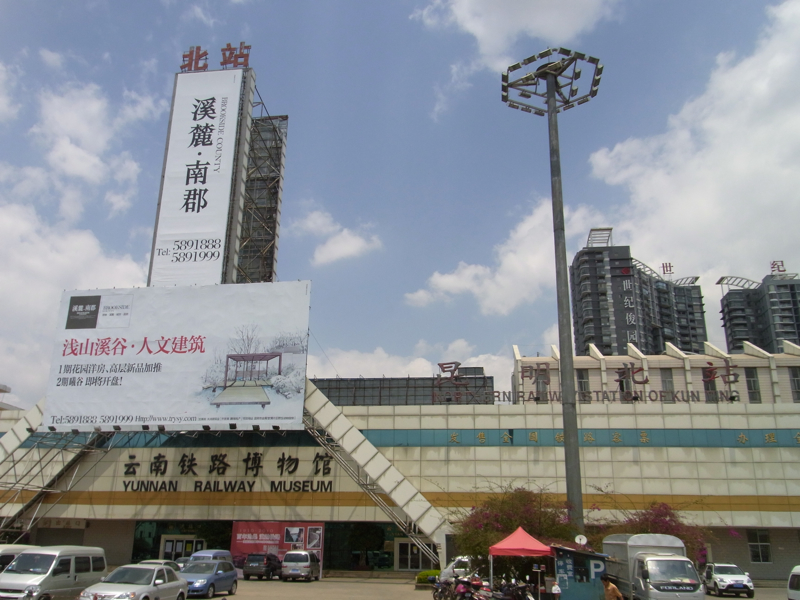
Kunming North railway station and Yunnan Railway Museum in 2010. (This is the old terminal building, it was demolished and replaced by the new terminal building shown at the beginning of the page)

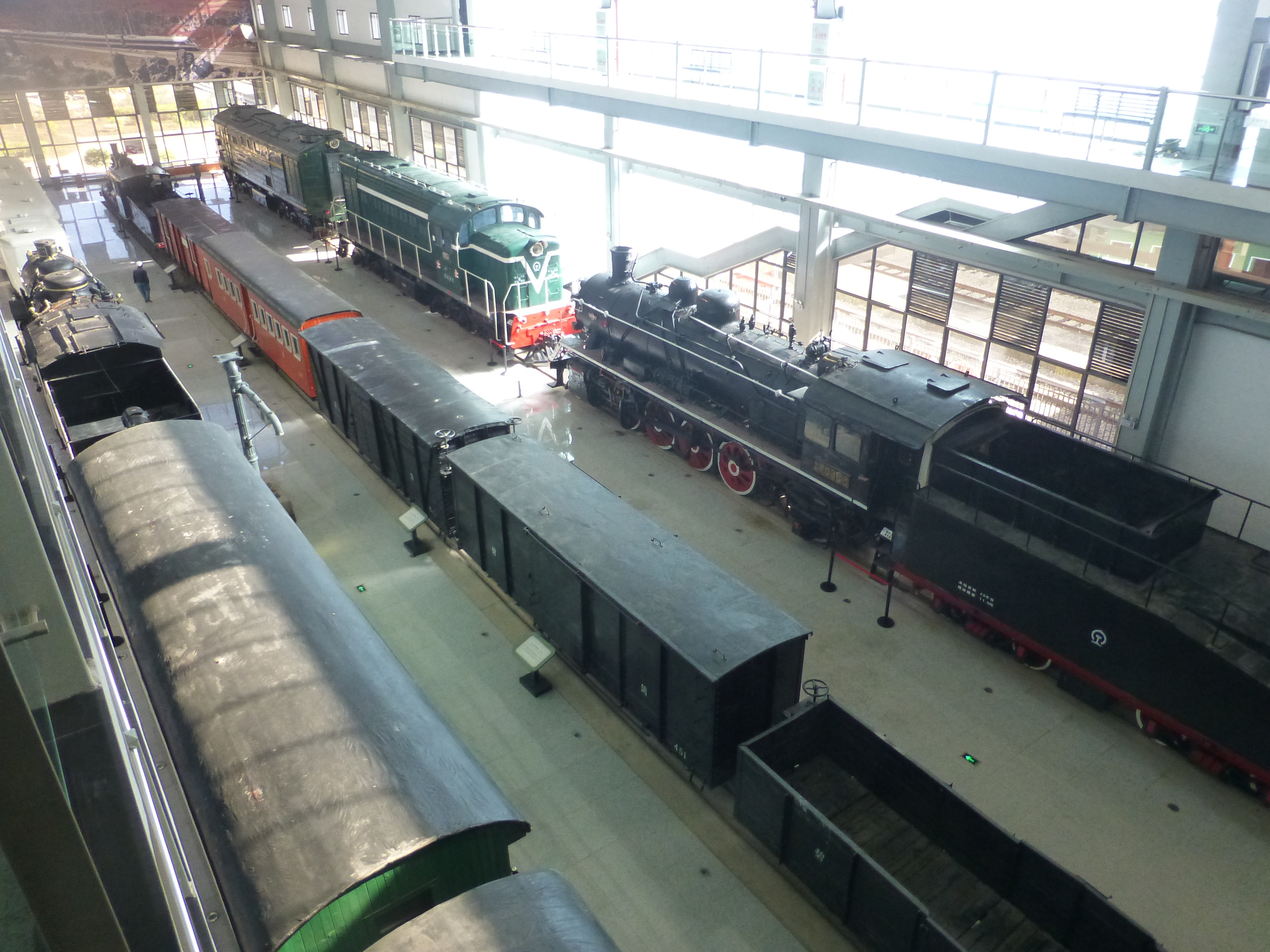
Rolling stock on display in the museum's trainshed

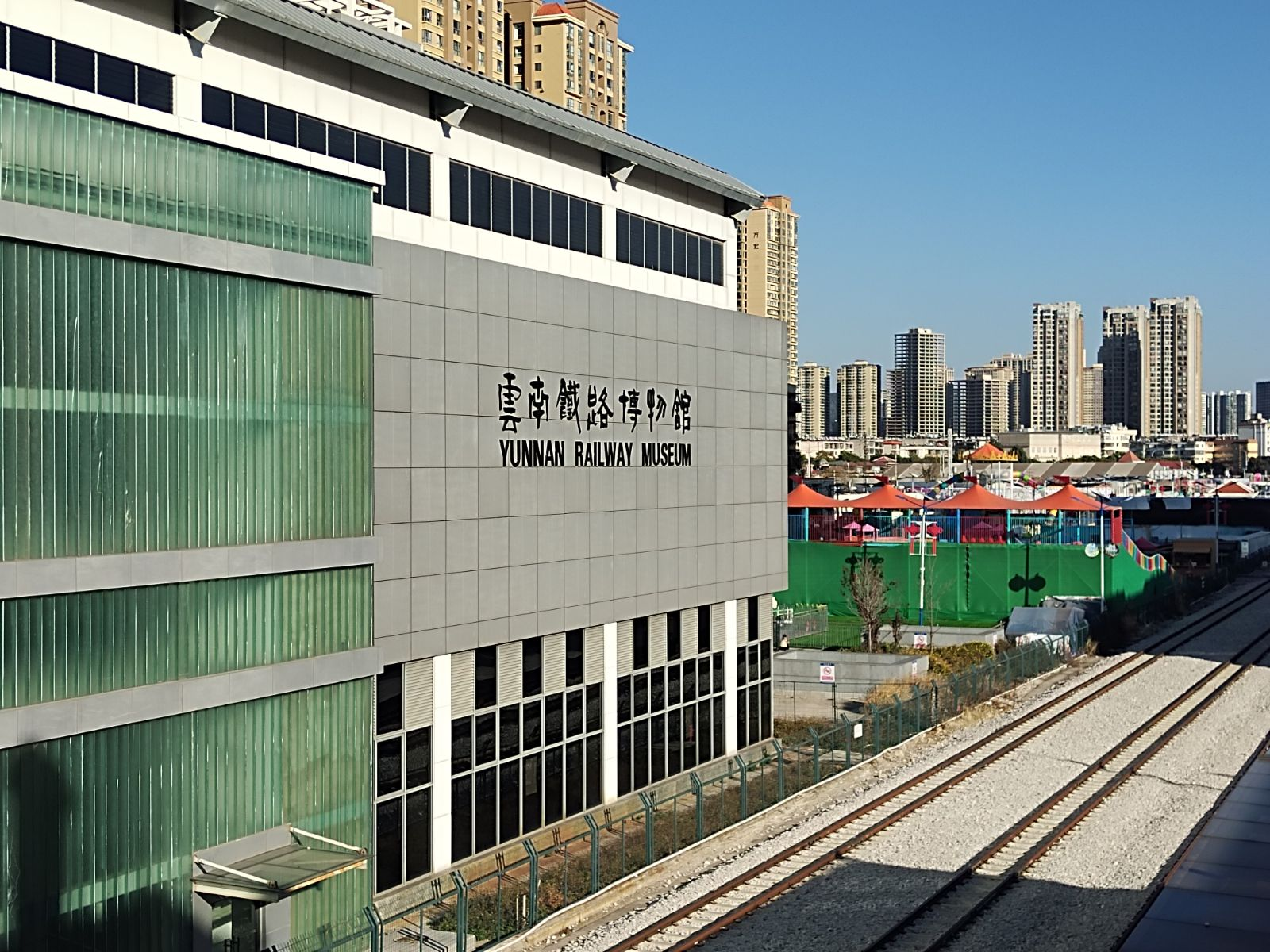
Yunnan Railway Museum

The Yunnan Railway Museum (云南铁路博物馆, Yúnnán Tiělù Bówùguǎn) is adjacent to the station's tracks. As of 2012, most of the museum is closed due to the Kunming Metro construction and the replacement of the terminal building, but its historical railcar exhibit is still open. In September 2014, the museum was completely reopened to the public. Historic railcars and locomotives are settled in a trainshed across from the newly constructed terminal building, and are accessible by a footbridge across the railway station.

== Metro station ==
North Railway Station 火车北站
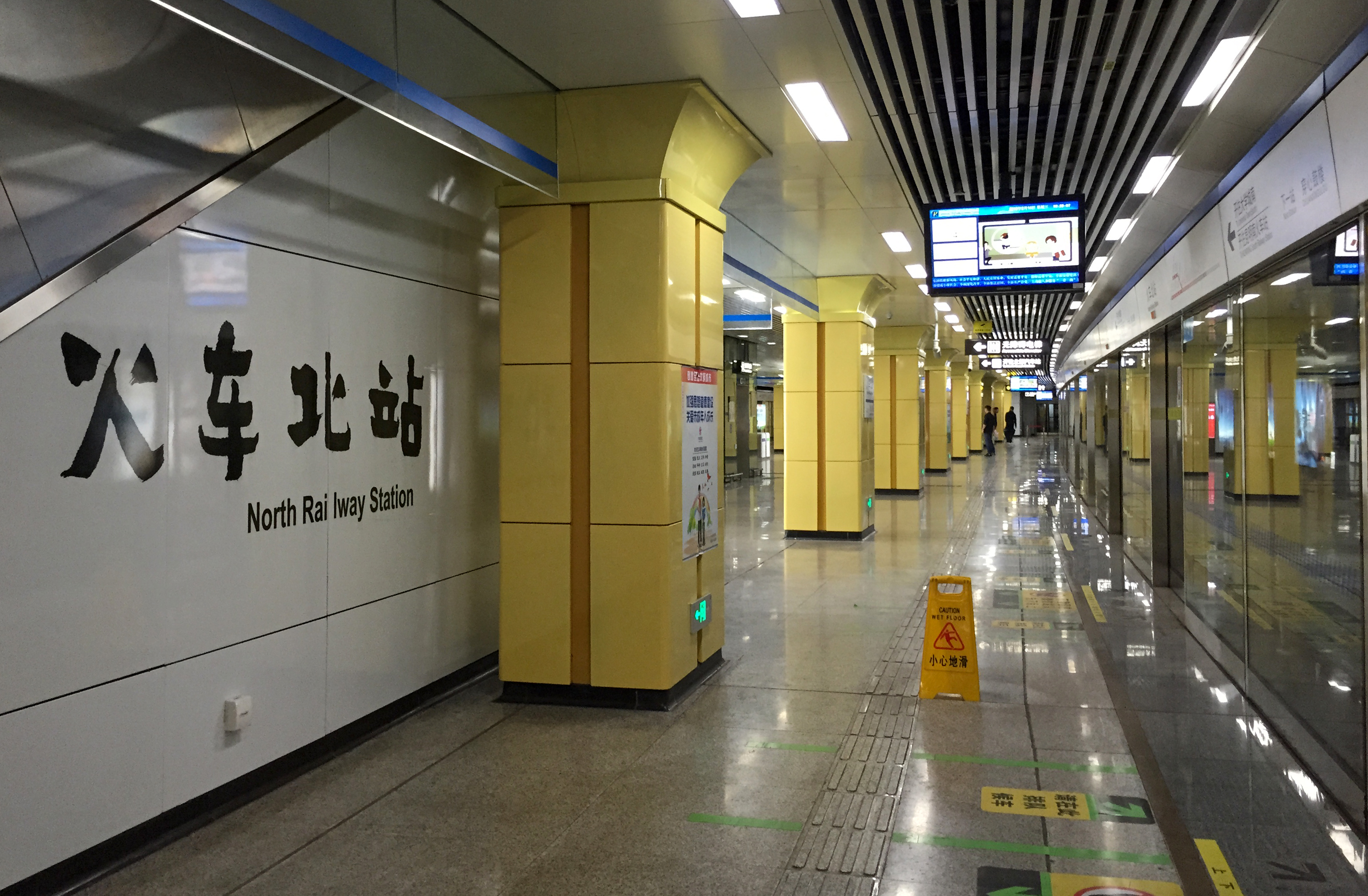
- Platform of Line 2

General information
- Location: Kunming, Yunnan; China
- Operated by: Kunming Rail Transit Corporation
- Lines: Line 2 (through operation to Line 1); Line 4 Line 5
- Platforms: 6 (3 island platforms)

Construction
- Structure type: Underground

History
- Opened: 1 September 2014 (Line 2); 23 September 2020 (Line 4); 29 June 2022 (Line 5)

Services
Preceding station	Kunming Metro	Following station
Baiyun Road towards North Coach Station	Line 2 (through operation to Line 1)	Chuanxin Gulou towards University Town (South) or Kunming South Railway Station
Xiaocaiyuan towards Jinchuan Road	Line 4	Bailong Road towards Kunming South Railway Station
Chuanjin Road towards World Horti-Expo Garden	Line 5	Yuantong Hill towards Baofeng
Location

North Railway Station, located in Panlong District, Kunming, is an interchange station among Line 2, Line 4 and Line 5 of Kunming Metro. A cross-platform interchange is provided between Line 4 and Line 5. The headquarters of Kunming Rail Transit Group, the operator of the metro, is located nearby.

== See also ==
- Kunming railway station
- Kunming South railway station
