= Kunming Metro =

Metro system in Yunnan, China

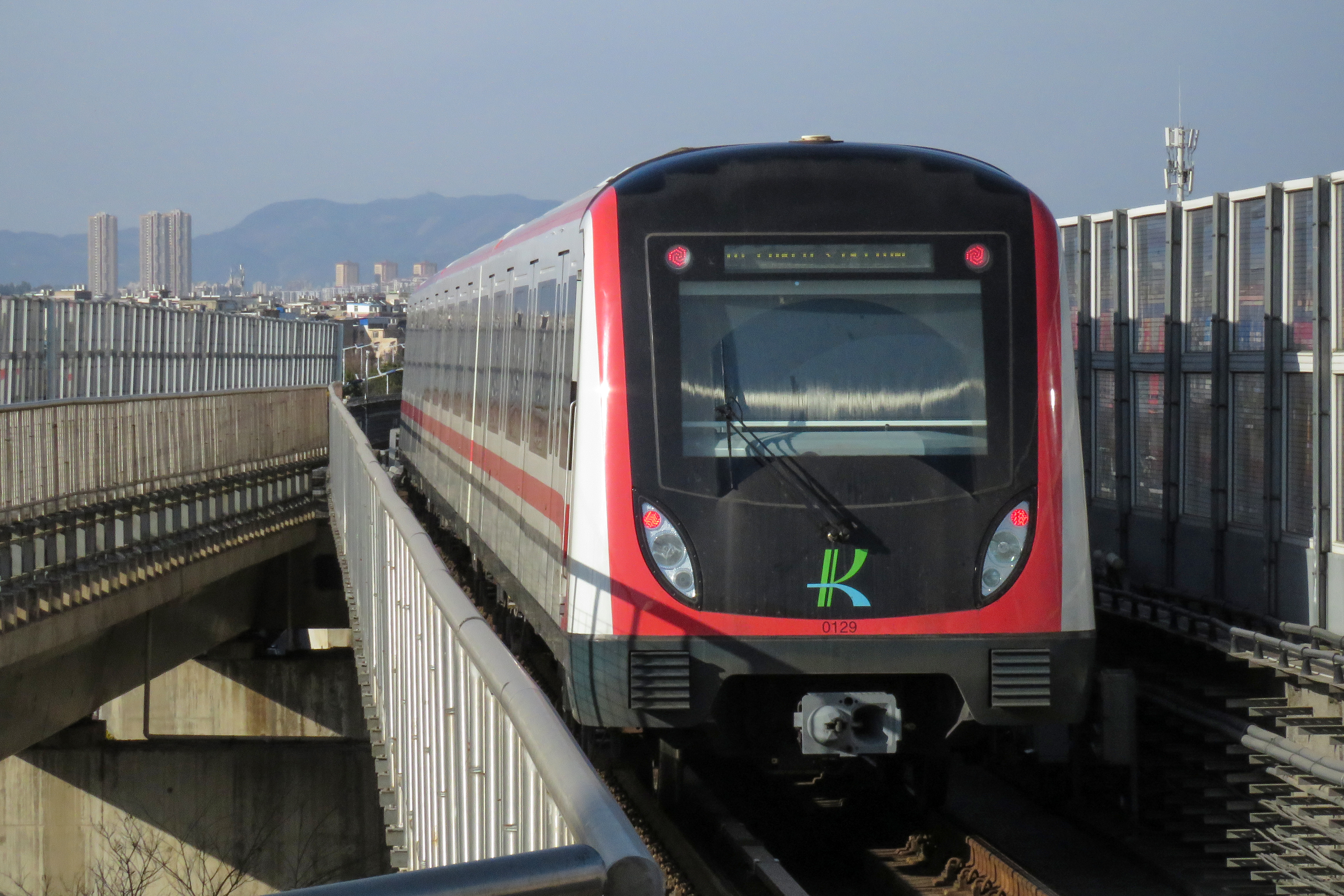

Overview
- Native name: 昆明地铁
- Owner: Kunming Rail Transit Group
- Locale: Kunming, Yunnan, China
- Transit type: Rapid transit
- Number of lines: 6 (Operational)
- Line number: 1 2 3 4 5 6
- Number of stations: 115
- Daily ridership: 798,100 (2021 daily avg.)
- Annual ridership: 222 million (2021)

Operation
- Began operation: 28 June 2012; 14 years ago
- Operator: Kunming Rail Transit Group
- Headway: 5 minutes (Lines 1/2) 8 minutes (All others)

Technical
- System length: 164.3 km (102.1 mi)
- Track gauge: Standard gauge
- Average speed: 80 km/h (50 mph)
- Top speed: 120 km/h (75 mph)

Kunming Metro
- Simplified Chinese: 昆明轨道交通
- Traditional Chinese: 昆明軌道交通
- Literal meaning: Kunming Rail Transit
Transcriptions
Standard Mandarin
- Hanyu Pinyin: Kūnmíng Guǐdào Jiāotōng

Alternative Chinese name
- Simplified Chinese: 昆明地铁
- Traditional Chinese: 昆明地鐵
- Literal meaning: Kunming Subway
Transcriptions
Standard Mandarin
- Hanyu Pinyin: Kūnmíng Dìtiě

Kunming Metro, or Kunming Rail Transit, is a rapid transit system in Kunming, the capital of China's Yunnan Province. The system currently consists of 6 lines with 2 extensions to existing lines under construction and 3 more lines planned, with a total track length of 164.3 kilometers.

== Background ==
The streets of Kunming have long been congested, and as such there have been talks of a subway system since the late 1990s. With a rapidly growing population of just over 3 million people at the time of the network's construction (And over 5 million people living in the built-up urban area as of 2020), Kunming was one of the largest cities in China without a metro system before its construction. A 2006 proposal would have seen construction start in 2008 with a north-south line and an east-west line. The current rapid transit system was first announced in 2009, with construction scheduled to start later that year. The proposed routes would not only serve commuters in Kunming's city centre, but would help encourage development to the city's southeast. Chenggong District has been the site of a recent construction boom, although most new developments were still unoccupied without adequate transit connections. Thus, the Kunming Metro served the dual purpose of alleviating traffic problems in the city's core and encouraging growth in the southeast.

Construction on Lines 1 and 2 officially began in May 2010, after months of delays. An elevated test section had been under construction since 2009. Lines 1 (34 km) and 2 (22 km) were scheduled to open in 2012, but with delays, weren't opened until early 2013. Construction on Line 3 began in August 2010 and was opened on 29 August 2017.

Construction of Line 1 was expected to cost as much as 32 billion yuan (US$4.5 billion), with each kilometer of elevated metro costing around 250 million yuan and each kilometer of underground subway expected to cost between 400 million and 800 million yuan. The primary contractor is China Railway Construction Corporation (CRCC).

== Fares ==
Kunming Metro operates on a distance-based fare system. Fare levels are determined by distance traveled and calculated in fixed kilometer brackets. Children under 1.3 meters in height, passengers with disabilities, senior citizens aged 70 and above, military personnel, and members of the People’s Armed Police are exempt from fares. Students receive a 50% discount, while senior citizens aged 60 to 69 receive a 20% discount.

Trip distance	Fare
<4km	¥2
4–8km	¥3
8–13km	¥4
13–19km	¥5
19–26km	¥6
26–34km	¥7
34–43km	¥8
43–53km	¥9
53–63km	¥10

The Kunming Transportation Union Card (Zhihuitong/智慧通) and other China T-Union cards are accepted on the Kunming Metro. The system also supports virtual QR code tickets, including WeChat Transit QR Code, Alipay Transit QR Code, and UnionPay Mobile QuickPass, as well as virtual NFC transit cards on mobile wallet platforms such as Xiaomi Wallet and Apple Wallet.

All stations are equipped with self-service recharge and single-journey ticket vending machines, which support cash payments (¥5, ¥10, ¥20, and ¥50 banknotes), Alipay, WeChat Pay, Visa, and UnionPay. Card sales and refunds are handled at customer service counters.

== Rolling stock ==
The trains of Line 6 were manufactured by China South Locomotive & Rolling Stock Corporation Ltd (CSR, now CRRC) in Zhuzhou. 6-car sets operate at 120 km/h. CSR met journalists in October 2011 to discuss the safety concerns arising from operating trains at such speeds. Changes have been made to the rolling stock over time. Line 1, 2, and 6 trains feature a physical route map made with LED lights, although some Line 1 and 2 trains have been updated with new digital UIs. Line 3 trains feature a digital route map with a basic UI. Line 4 trains have darker flooring, a new UI on the info boards inside the train cars, and a remade route map UI. Line 5 trains reverted the flooring color back to white, remade the info board UI again, modified the route map UI, and feature projectors on the outside of the train that project advertisements onto the tunnel walls.

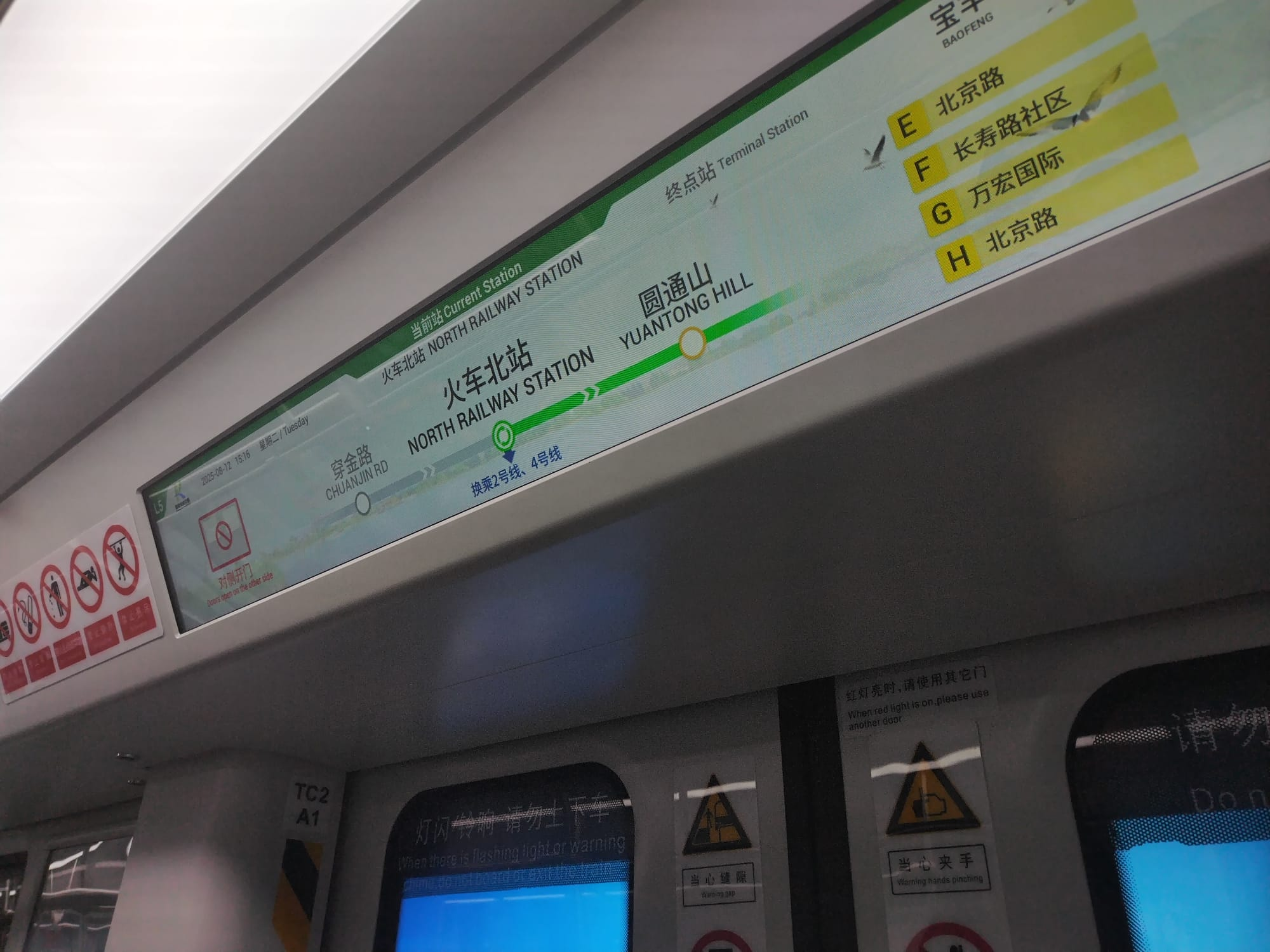
Digital route display panel on a Line 5 train

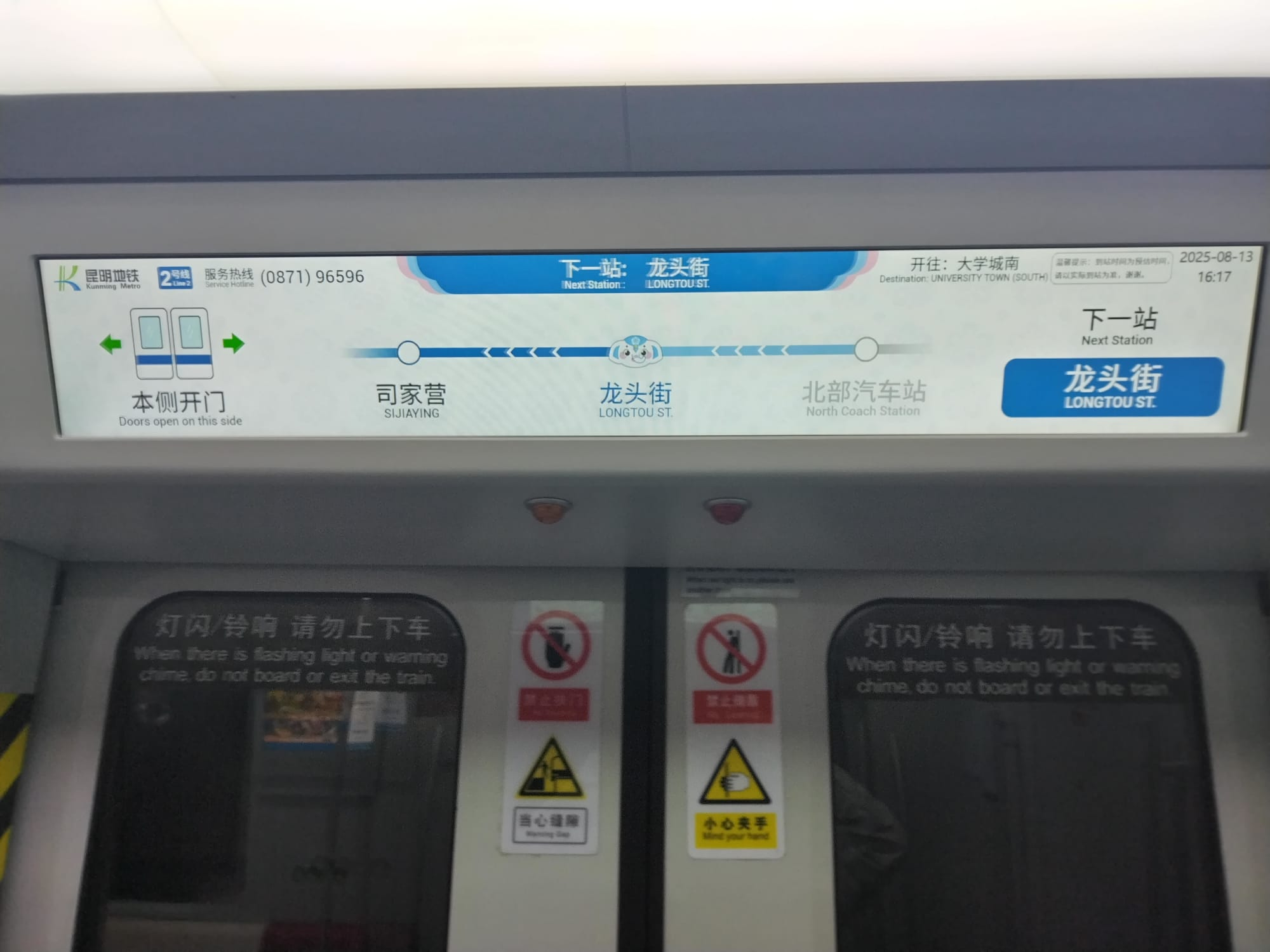
New digital panels on a Line 1/2 train

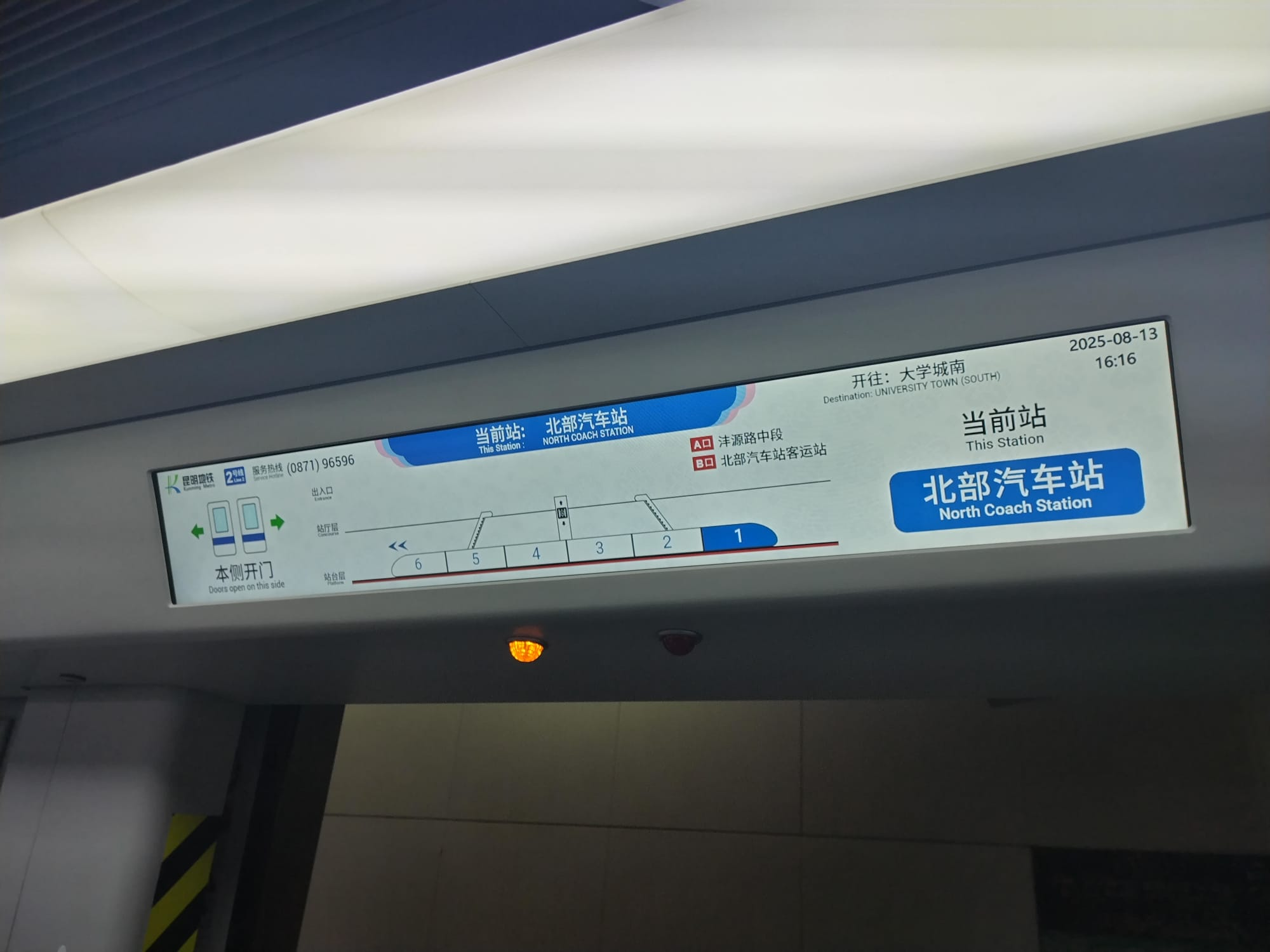
New digital panels on a Line 1/2 train displaying platform information

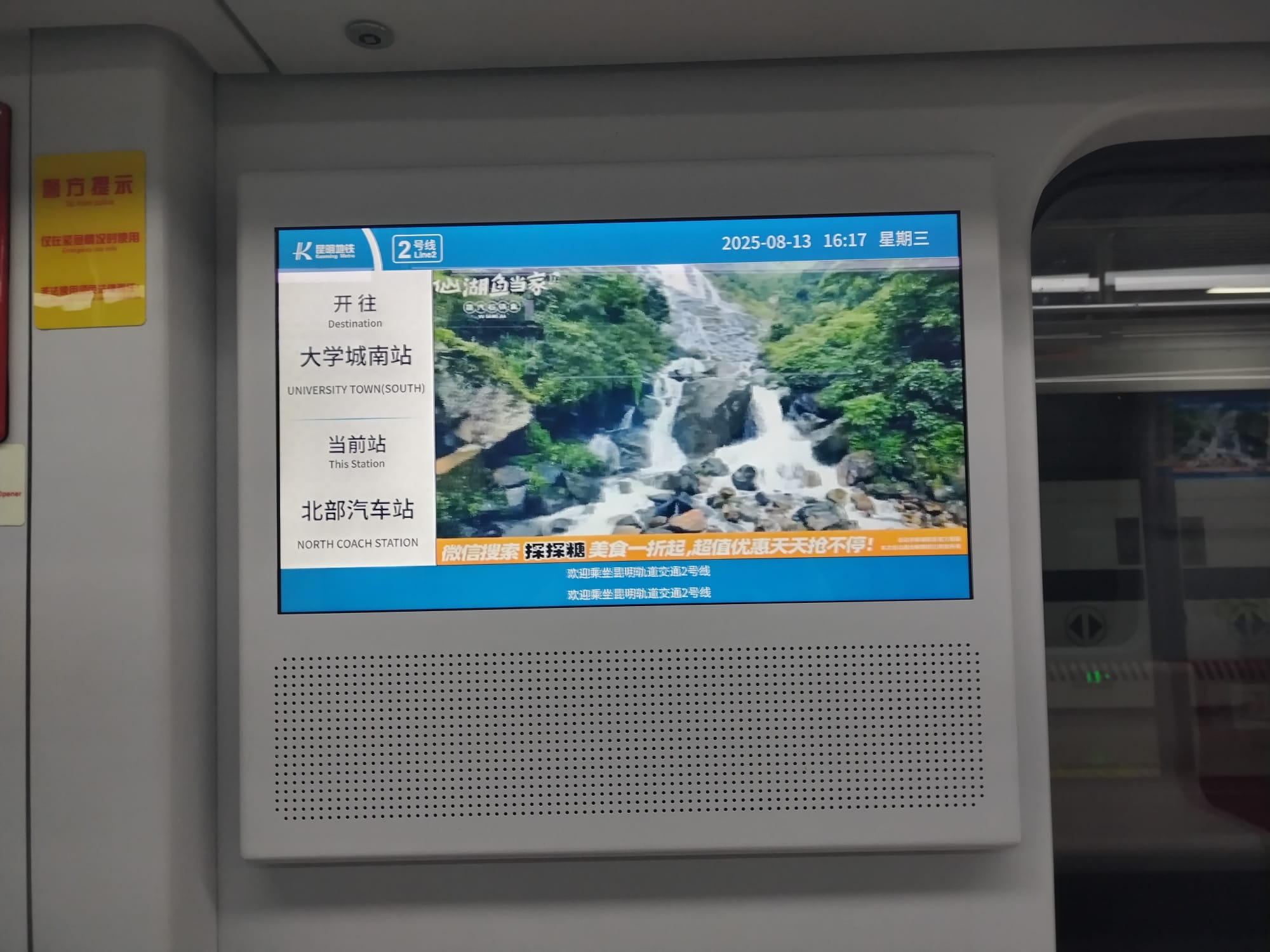
Info boards on a Line 1/2 train

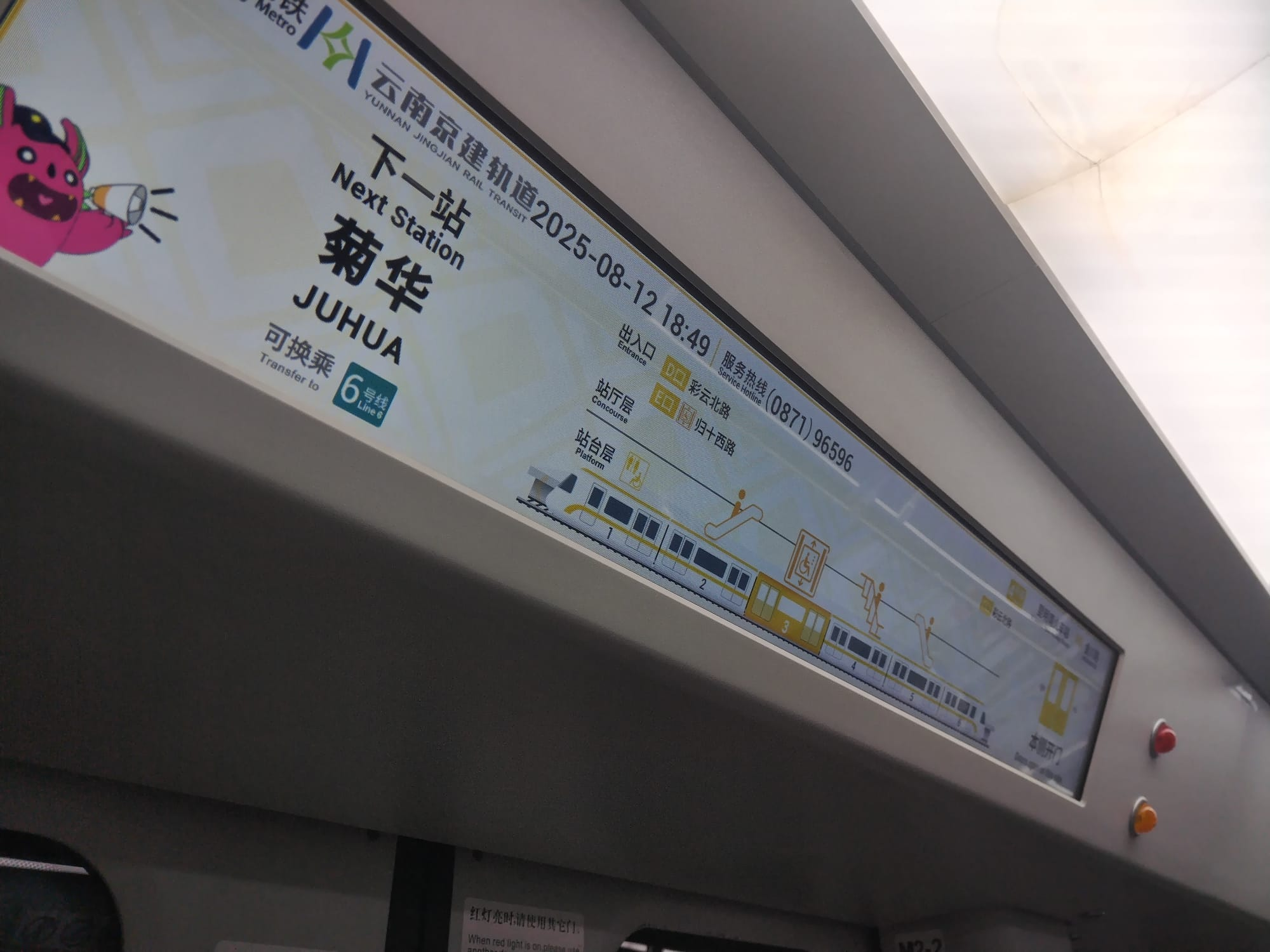
Digital route display on a Line 4 train

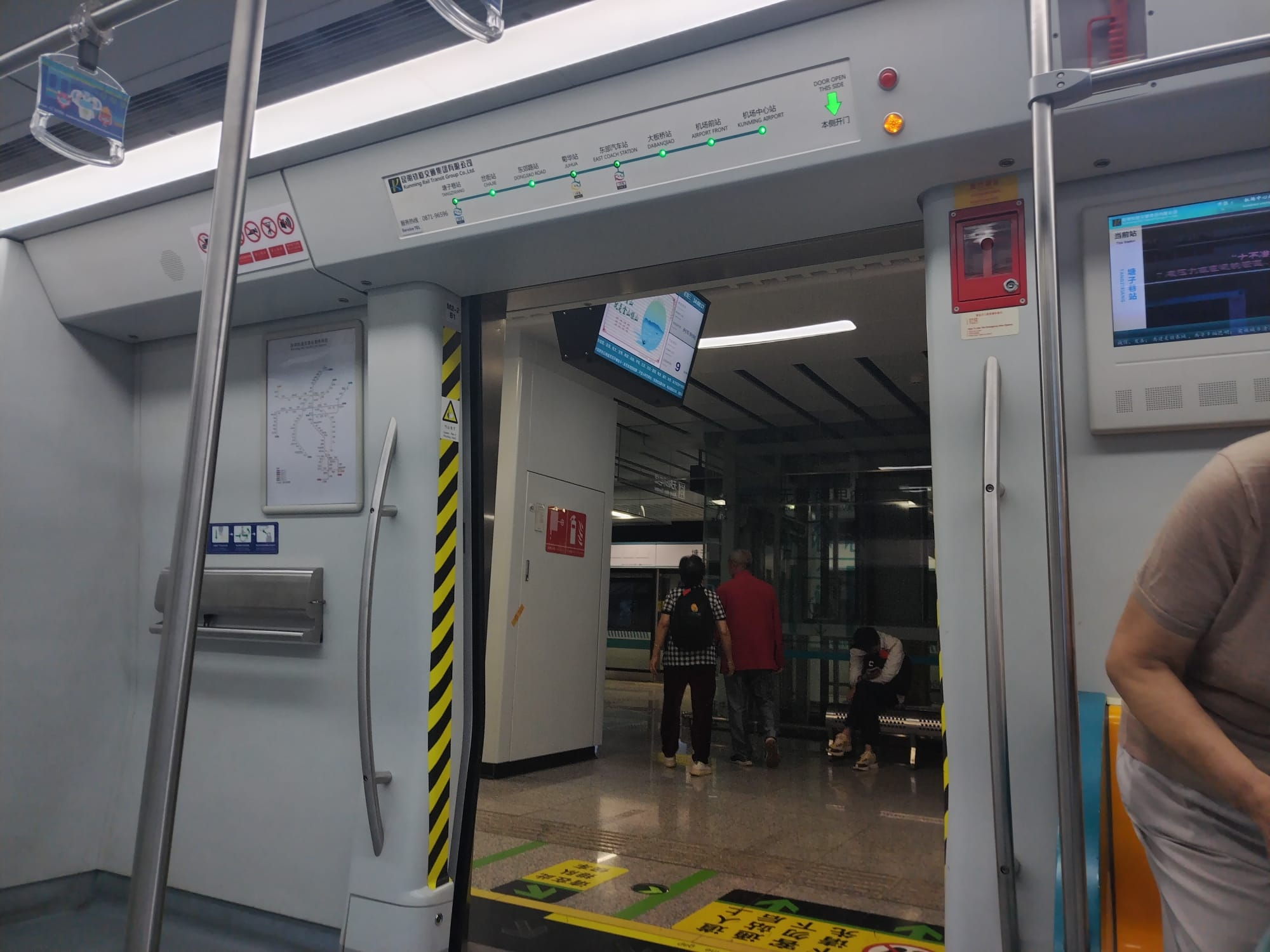
Physical LED route diagram on a Line 6 train

== Lines ==
=== Operational ===
Kunming Metro lines

Line	Terminals (District)		Commencement	Newest Extension	Length km	Stations
1	South Ring Road (Note: Through operation between Line 1 and Line 2 is currently provided, meaning passengers do not need to transfer at South Ring Road station) (Guandu)	University Town (South) (Chenggong)	May 20, 2013	December 28, 2016	33.3	22
1	South Ring Road (Guandu)	Kunming South Railway Station (Chenggong)	May 20, 2013	December 28, 2016	33.3	22
2	North Coach Station (Panlong)	South Ring Road (Guandu)	April 30, 2014	—	12.4	14
3	Western Hills Park (Xishan)	East Coach Station (Panlong)	August 28, 2017	—	23.4	20
4	Jinchuan Road (Wuhua)	Kunming South Railway Station (Chenggong)	September 23, 2020	—	43.4	29
5	World Horti-Expo Garden (Panlong)	Baofeng (Guandu)	June 29, 2022	—	26.5	22
6	Tangzixiang (Panlong/Guandu)	Kunming Airport (Guandu)	June 28, 2012	September 23, 2020	25.3	8
Total					164.3	115

==== Line 1 ====
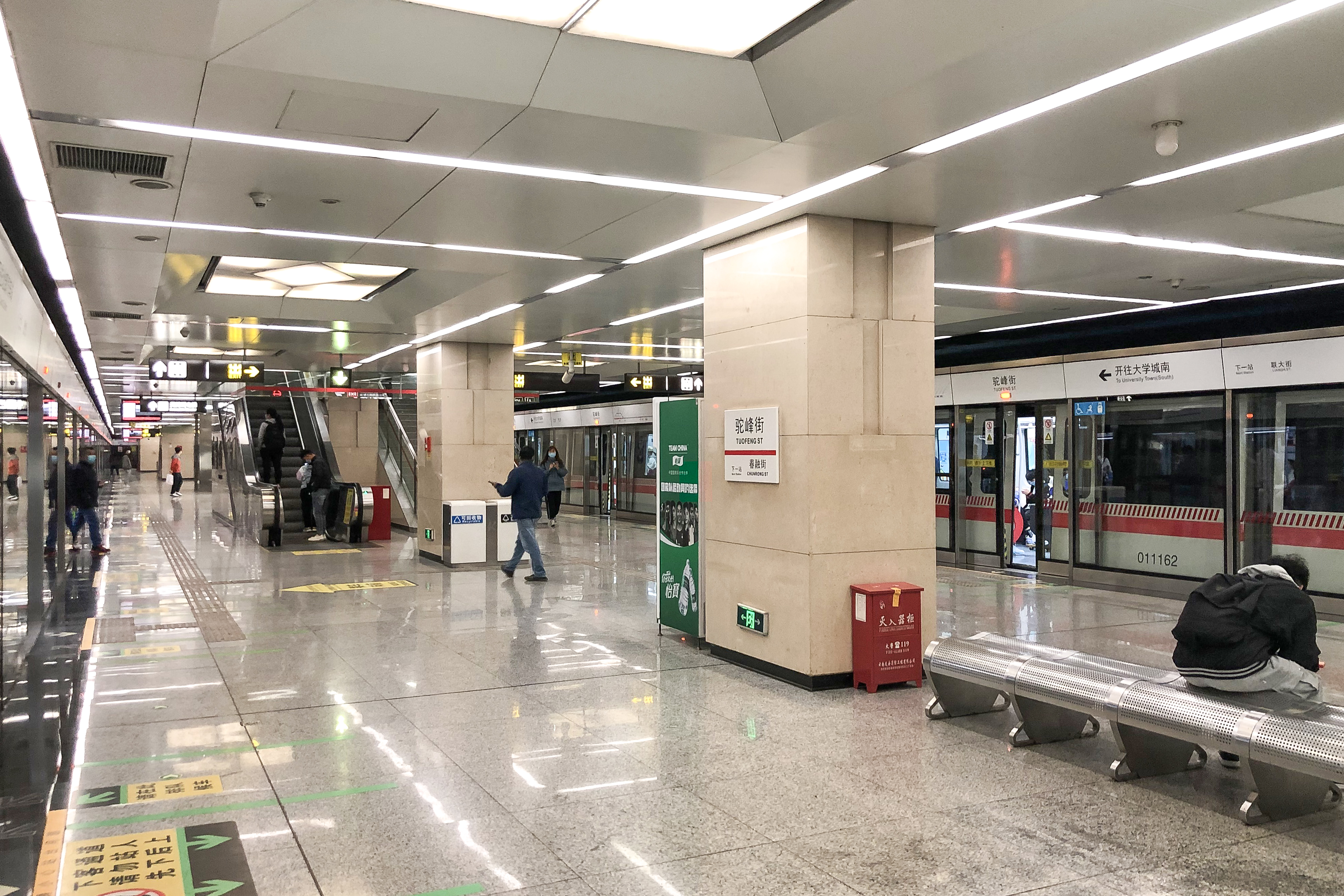
Tuofeng Street station on Line 1

Line 1 is currently 33.3 km long with 22 stations, running from South Ring Road to University Town (South) and Kunming South railway station. Lines 1 and 2 currently have through service, which will end when Line 1 Northwest Extension and Line 2 Phase 2 are completed, turning South Ring Road into an interchange station. After the Northwest Extension opens, Line 1 will run from Jiaochang North Road to University Town (South) and Kunming South Railway Station. The first phase of Line 1 came into operation on May 20, 2013. The second phase of Line 1 came into operation on April 30, 2014. A 5.3 km long branch line to Kunming South railway station was opened on 26 December 2016. Line 1's route currently consists of an elevated section connecting Kunming to Chenggong and an underground section below Caiyun Road within Chenggong. The northwest extension will be dug underground along the west side of Kunming's city center. It is Kunming's main rail link to Chenggong. Line 1's color is red.

==== Line 2 ====
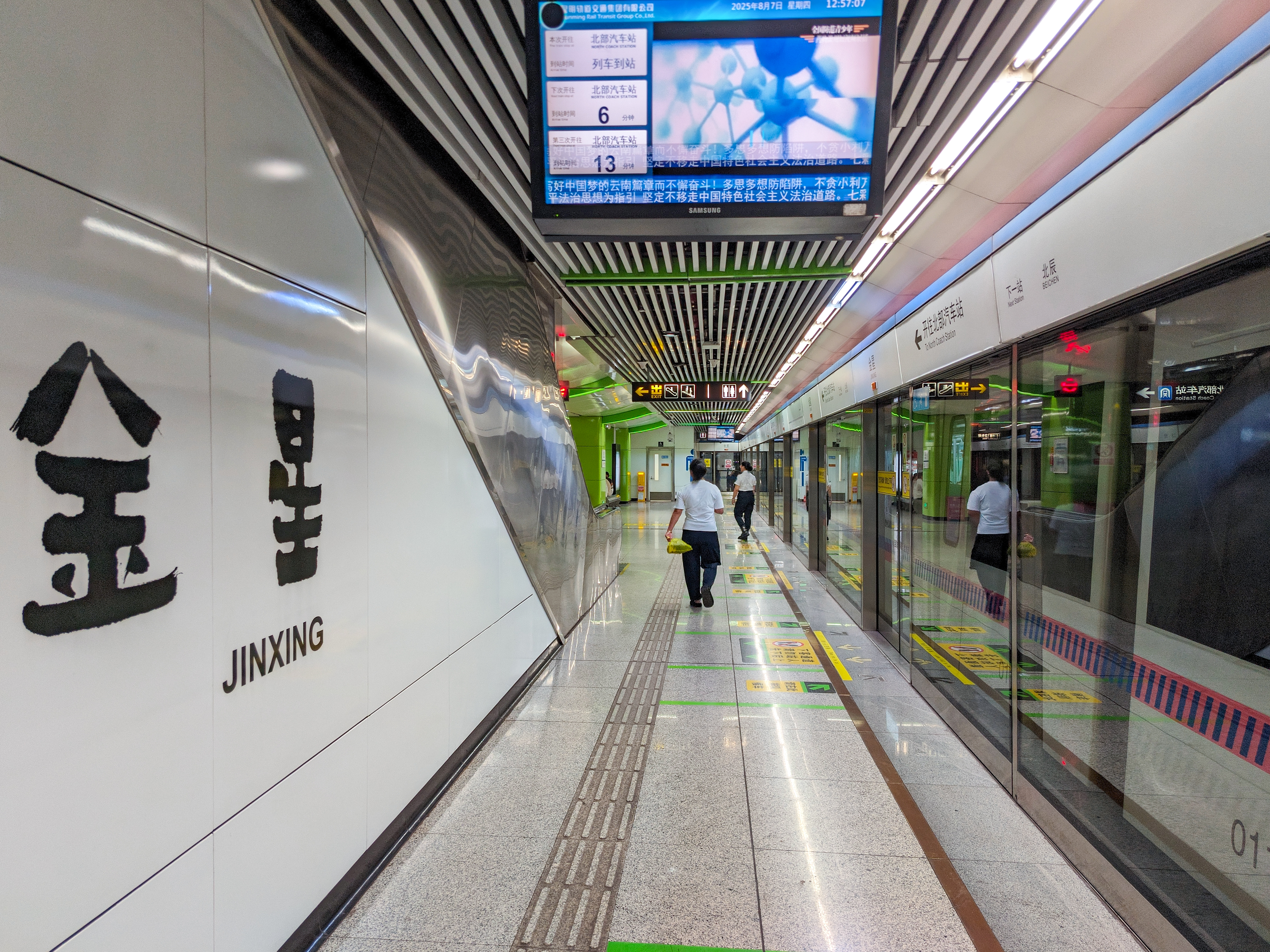
Jinxing station on Line 2

Line 2 is currently 12.4 km long with 14 stations, running from North Coach Station to South Ring Road. Lines 1 and 2 currently have through service, which will end when Line 1 Northwest Extension and Line 2 Phase 2 are completed, turning South Ring Road into an interchange station. After Phase 2 opens, Line 2 will run from North Coach Station to Haidong Park. The first phase of Line 2 came into operation on April 30, 2014. Line 2's route currently consists of a short elevated section from North Coach Station to Longtou Street and an underground section beneath Beijing Road until the line's current terminus at South Ring Road. Phase 2 will be dug beneath Guannan Avenue and Fubao Road towards Haidong Park. It is Kunming's main north-south line. Line 2's color is blue.

==== Line 3 ====
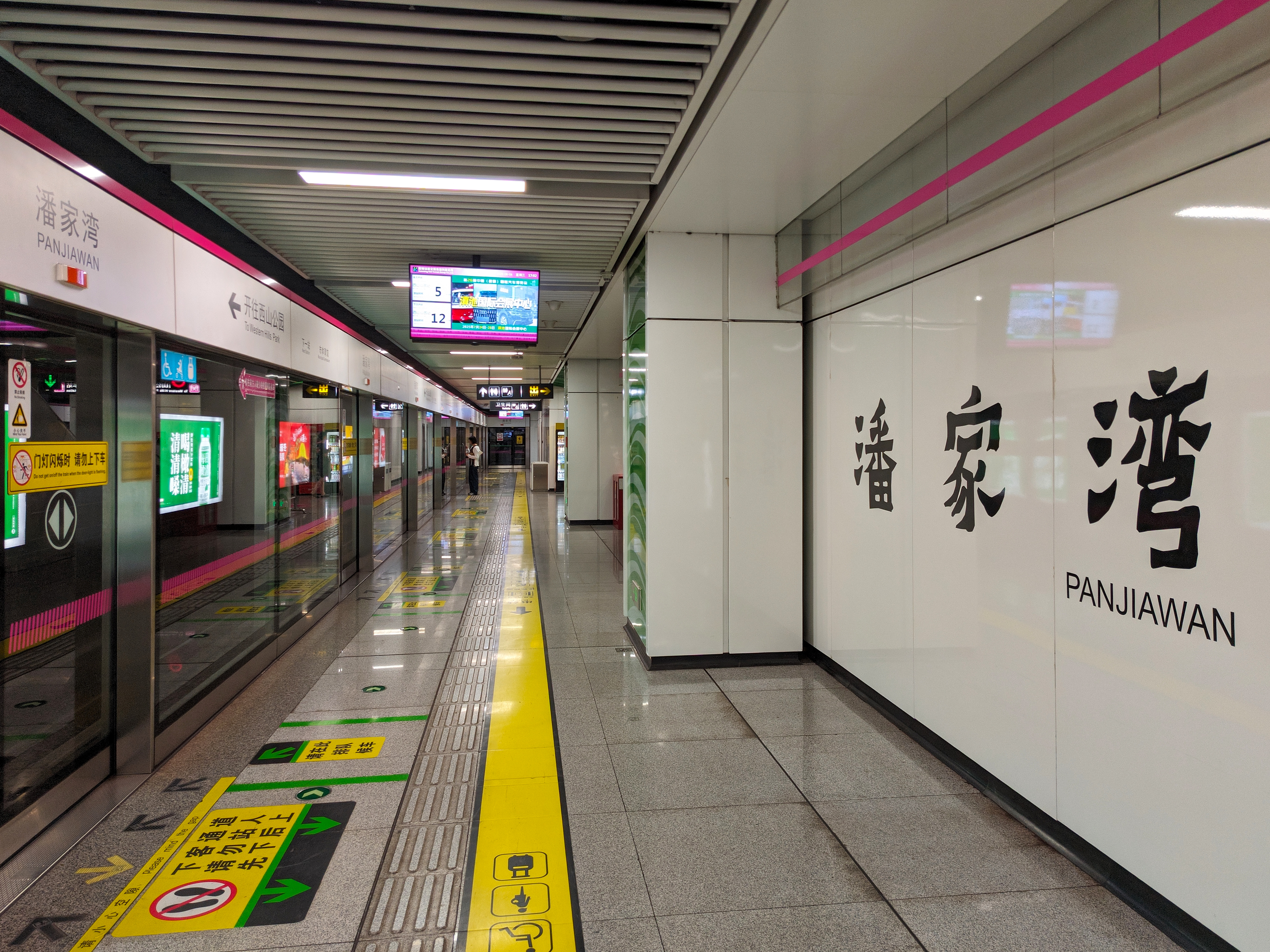
Panjiawan station on Line 3

Line 3 started operation on 29 Aug 2017, consisting of 19.16 km of line with 20 stations running from Western Hills Park to East Coach Station. It is Kunming's main east-west line. Line 3's color is magenta.

==== Line 4 ====
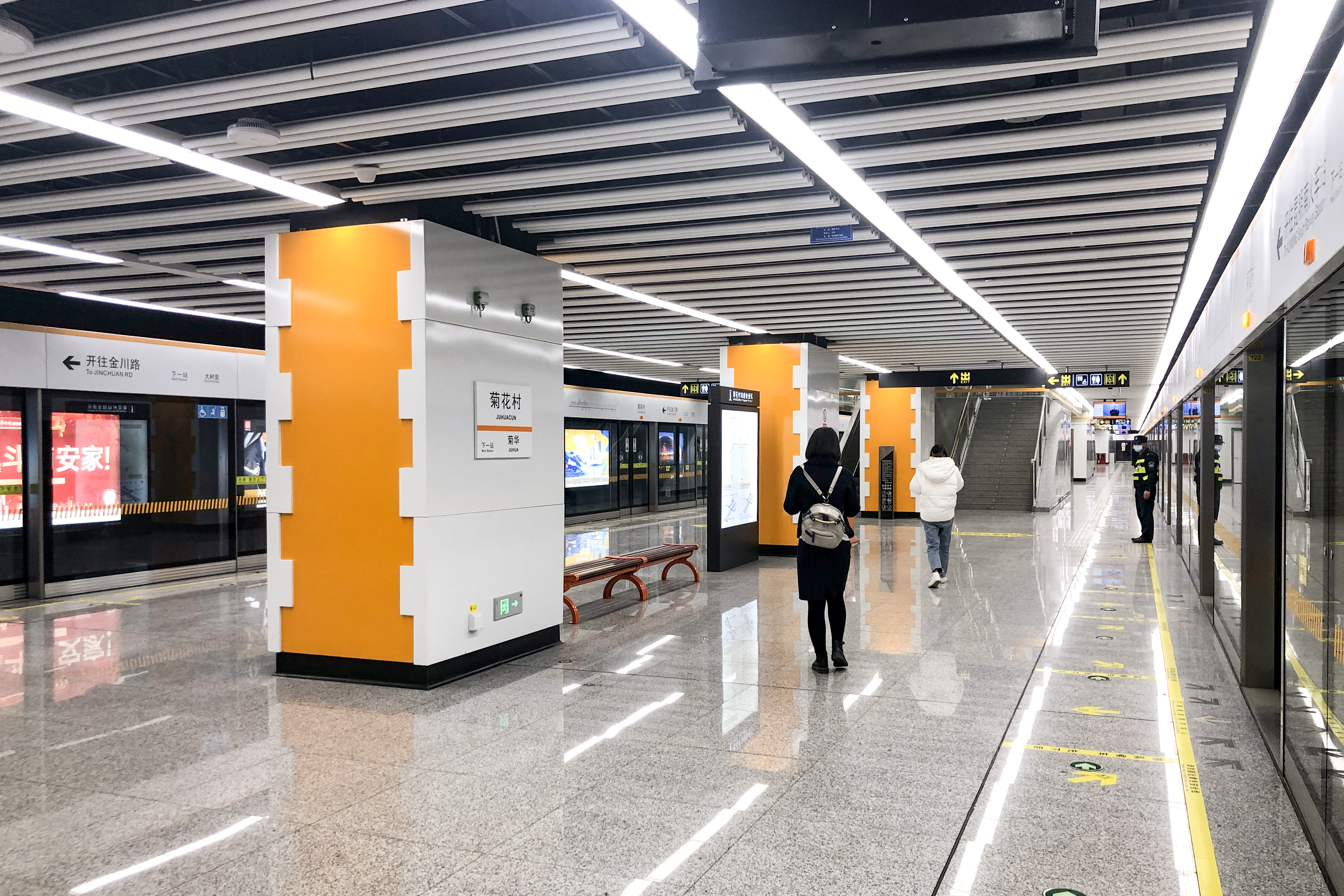
Juhuacun station on Line 4

Line 4 started operation on 23 September 2020, consisting of 43.4 km of line with 29 stations running from Jinchuan Road to Kunming South Railway Station. It connects Northwest Kunming and Eastern Kunming to the metro while serving as a second link to Chenggong. Line 4 has cartoon mascots exclusive to the line known as the "K4 Cats" that promote ridership of the line. Line 4's color is orange.

==== Line 5 ====
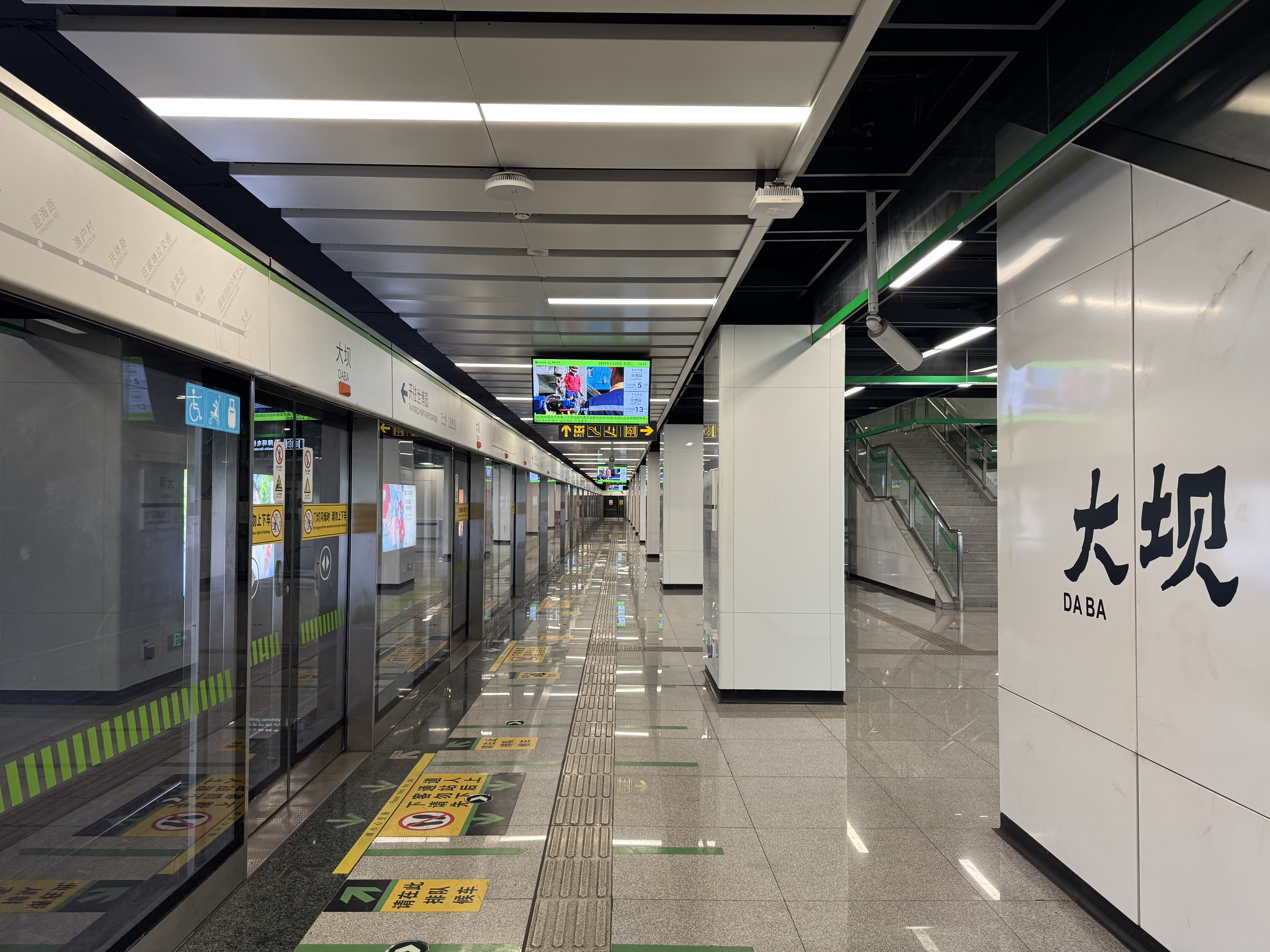
Daba station on Line 5

Line 5 started operation on 29 June 2022, consisting of 26.5 km of line with 22 stations running from World Horti-Expo Garden to Baofeng. Line 5 serves mainly as a tourism line, linking several tourist destinations such as World Horti-Expo Garden, Haigeng Dam, and Haigeng Park. Line 5's color is green.

==== Line 6 ====
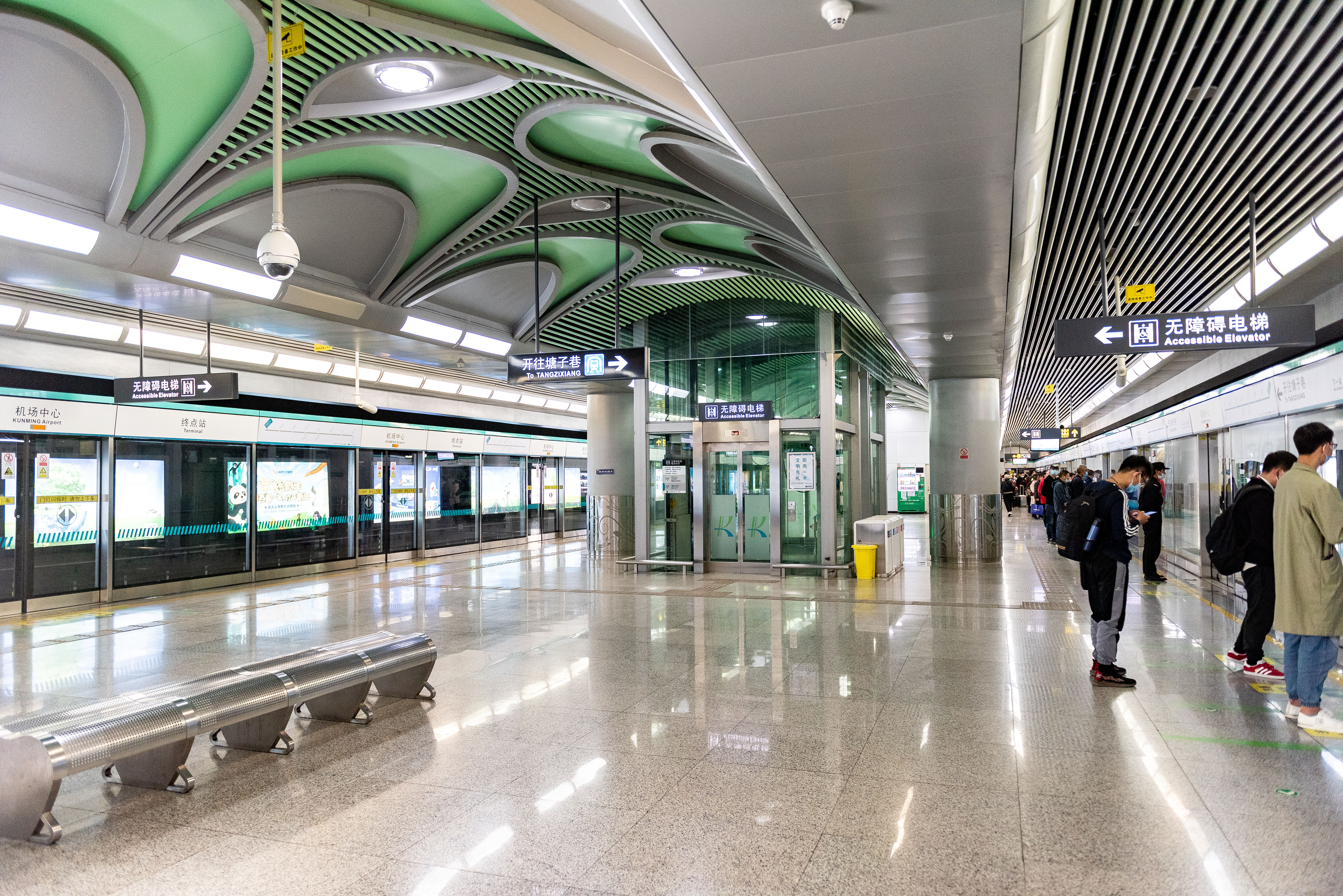
Kunming Airport station on Line 6

Line 6 consists of 25.3 km of line with 8 stations running from Kunming Airport to Tangzixiang. Phase 1 opened on 28 June 2012. Phase 2 opened on 23 September 2020, extending the line to Tangzixiang station just south of Kunming's city center. It is an airport express line connecting the city center with the new Kunming Changshui International Airport. Its original terminus at East Coach Station was not connected to any other line until the opening of Line 3 in 2017. The two intermediate stations between East Coach Station and Kunming Airport were built as infill stations. Line 6 temporary ceased operation on 5 March 2016 to complete the two infill stations and reentered operation on 29 August 2017 with a total of four stations. Line 6's color is teal.

=== Planned & under construction ===
The extensions of Lines 1 & 2 are under construction, but have faced many delays from their original opening date in 2022 and are now projected to open in 2028. Line 9, the Songming Line, and the Anning Line are planned. All station names that are included in phase 1 of Line 9 have been confirmed. Construction of the planned new lines are currently on hold due to a lack of funding and unstable leadership.

Opening	Line	Phase/extension	Terminals		Total Length in km	Stations	Notes
2028	1	Northwest ext.	Jiaochang North Road	South Ring Road	7.55	7	
2028	2	Phase II	South Ring Road	Haidong Park	14.285	11	
TBA	9	Phase I	Guangdian University	Jincheng South	50.4	28	
TBA	9	Phase II	Dabanqiao	Guangdian University	32.9	18	
TBA	Songming	Full line	Kunming Airport T2	Songming	20	5	
TBA	Anning	Full line	Kunming West Railway Station	Vocational Education Center (South)	29.8	9	

== See also ==
- Kunming
- List of rapid transit systems
- High-speed rail in China
- Urban rail transit in China

== Sources ==
- news.kunming.cn
- yn.xinhuanet.com
