= Line 2 (Kunming Metro) =

Metro line in Kunming, China

Overview
- Status: Operational
- Locale: Kunming, Yunnan, China
- Termini: North Coach Station; South Ring Road
- Stations: 14

Service
- Type: Rapid transit
- System: Kunming Metro
- Operator(s): Kunming Rail Transit Corp., Ltd

History
- Opened: 30 April 2014; 12 years ago

Technical
- Line length: 12.4 km (7.71 mi)
- Num of tracks: 2
- Track gauge: 1,435 mm (4 ft 8 1/2 in)
- Highest elevation: Underground and elevated

Line 2 of Kunming Metro (Chinese: 昆明轨道交通2号线; pinyin: Kūnmíng Guǐdào Jiāotōng Èr Hào Xiàn) is a rapid transit line connecting Panlong District with Kunming's urban center, which is currently 12.4 kilometres (7.7 mi) long with 14 stations. The line started operation in 2014, and its color is blue. Currently, through service is provided between Line 1 and this line, meaning passengers from/to Line 1 do not need to transfer at South Ring Road station. Nevertheless, once Line 1 Northwestern extension and Line 2 Phase 2 are completed, this line will be separated from Line 1, and South Ring Road station will become an interchange station.

== Opening timeline ==
Segment	Date opened	Length	Station(s)	Name
North Coach Station — South Ring Road	30 April 2014	12.4 km (7.71 mi)	13	Phase 1
North Railway Station	1 September 2014	Infill station	1	

== Stations ==
Service routes		Station Name		Connections	Distance km		Location
Service routes		English	Chinese	Connections	Distance km		Location
●	●	North Coach Station	北部汽车站		-	0.00	Panlong
●	●	Longtou Street	龙头街		1.13	1.13	Panlong
●	●	Sijiaying	司家营		1.18	2.31	Panlong
●	●	Yangchangcun	羊肠村		1.00	3.31	Panlong
●	●	Linyuqiao	霖雨桥		0.93	4.24	Panlong
●	●	Beichen	北辰		1.54	5.78	Panlong
●	●	Jinxing	金星		0.73	6.51	Panlong
●	●	Baiyun Road	白云路		1.18	7.69	Panlong
●	●	North Railway Station	火车北站	4 5 KBM	1.08	8.77	Panlong
●	●	Chuanxin Gulou	穿心鼓楼		0.80	9.57	Panlong
●	●	Jiaosanqiao	交三桥		0.80	10.37	Panlong
●	●	Dongfeng Square	东风广场	3	0.49	10.86	Panlong
●	●	Tangzixiang	塘子巷	6	0.58	11.44	Panlong/Guandu
●	●	South Ring Road	环城南路	1	0.95	12.39	Guandu
↓	↓	Through service to/from University Town (South) or Kunming South Railway Station via Line 1					
		Kunming Railway Station	昆明火车站	1 KMM			Guandu
		Nanba	南坝				Guandu
		Yulong	玉龙				Guandu
		Xiaojie	小街				Guandu
		Guangfu Road	广福路				Guandu
		Yejiacun	叶家村				Guandu
		Liujia	六甲				Guandu
		Gongjiacun	龚家村				Guandu
		Dianchi International Convention and Exhibition Center	滇池国际会展中心	5			Guandu
		Baofeng	宝丰	5			Guandu
		Haidong Park	海东公园				Guandu
