= Line 1 (Kunming Metro) =

Metro line in Kunming, China

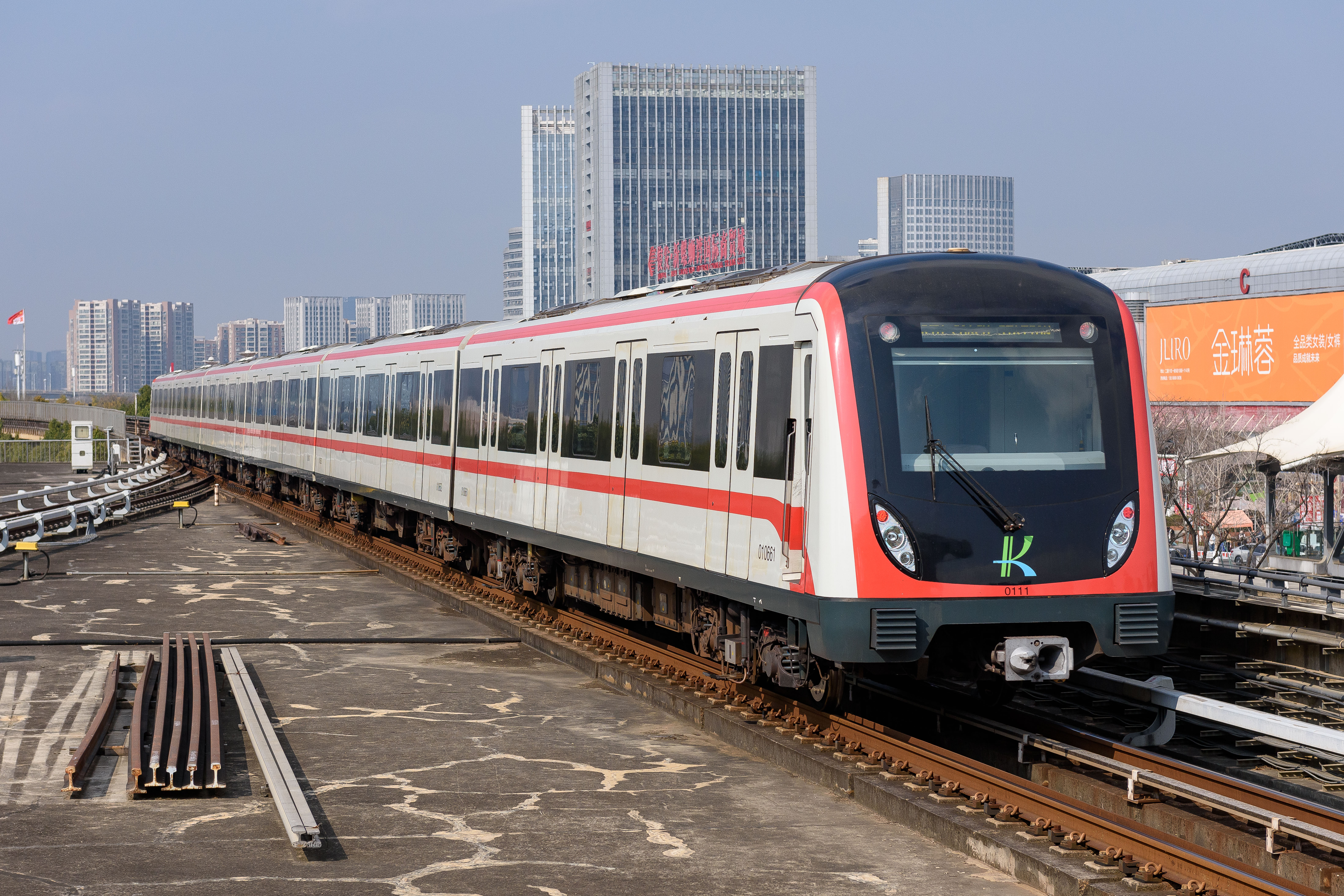
- Train of Line 1 (February 2026)

Overview
- Status: Operational
- Locale: Kunming, Yunnan Province, China
- Termini: South Ring Road; University Town (South) / Kunming South Railway Station (branch)
- Stations: 22

Service
- Type: Rapid transit
- System: Kunming Metro
- Operator(s): Kunming Rail Transit Corp., Ltd

History
- Opened: 20 May 2013; 13 years ago

Technical
- Line length: 34.0 km (21.13 mi)
- Num of tracks: 2
- Track gauge: 1,435 mm (4 ft 8 1/2 in)
- Highest elevation: Underground and elevated

Line 1 of Kunming Metro (Chinese: 昆明轨道交通1号线; pinyin: Kūnmíng Guǐdào Jiāotōng Yī Hào Xiàn) is a rapid transit line connecting Chenggong District with Kunming's urban center. The line is 34.0 kilometres (21.1 mi) long with 22 stations (excluding Line 2) with South Ring Road as the northern terminal, and University Town (South) as the southern terminal of the main line, and Kunming South Railway Station as the southern terminal of the branch line. The line started operation on 20 May 2013. Line 1's color is red. Currently, through service is provided between Line 2 and this line, meaning passengers from/to Line 2 do not need to transfer at South Ring Road station. Nevertheless, once Line 1 Northwestern extension and Line 2 Phase 2 are completed, this line will be separated from Line 2, and South Ring Road station will become an interchange station.

== Hours of operation ==
Since 2013, the operation hours for line 1 has been from 6:00 AM to 12:00 midnight daily with trains arriving every eight minutes.

Line 1/2 trains travels at speeds of up to 80 kilometres per hour (50 mph). On the initial operation one-way trip will take approximately 34 minutes.

== Opening timeline ==
Segment	Commencement	Length	Station(s)	Name
Xiaodongcun — University Town (South)	20 May 2013	22.1 km (13.73 mi)	12	Main Line (southern section)
South Ring Road — Xiaodongcun	30 April 2014	6.9 km (4.29 mi)	6	Main Line (northern section)
Chunrong Street — Kunming South Railway Station	28 December 2016	4.7 km (2.92 mi)	4	Branch (Kunming South Railway Station connector project)

== Stations ==
Service routes		Station Name		Connections	Distance km (Note: Including Line 2 (North Coach Station — South Ring Road))		Location
Service routes		English	Chinese	Connections	Distance km		Location
		Jiaochang North Road	教场北路		-	0	Wuhua
		Sujiatang	苏家塘	4			Wuhua
		1·21 Street	一二一大街				Wuhua
		Panjiawan	潘家湾	3			Wuhua
		Milesi	弥勒寺	5			Wuhua
		Jinbi Square	金碧广场				Wuhua/Xishan
		Deshengqiao	得胜桥				Wuhua/Xishan
↑	↑	Through service to/from North Coach Station via Line 2					
●	●	South Ring Road	环城南路	2	0.95	12.39	Guandu
●	●	Kunming Railway Station	昆明火车站	2 KMM	1.27	13.66	Guandu
●	●	Fude	福德		1.03	14.69	Guandu
●	●	Rixin Road	日新路		0.82	15.51	Guandu
●	●	Wujiaba	巫家坝		0.88	16.39	Guandu
●	●	Changhong West Road	昌宏西路		1.57	17.96	Guandu
●	●	Xiaodongcun	晓东村		1.08	19.04	Guandu
●	●	Erji Road	珥季路		1.74	20.78	Guandu
●	●	Xingyao Road	星耀路		1.74	22.52	Guandu
●	●	New Asia Athletics Park	新亚洲体育城		1.11	23.63	Guandu
●	●	South Coach Station	南部汽车站		2.05	25.68	Guandu
●	●	Dounan	斗南	4	3.01	28.69	Chenggong
●	●	Chunrong Street	春融街		4.51	33.2	Chenggong
●	❘	Tuofeng Street	驼峰街		1.33	34.53	Chenggong
●	❘	Lianda Street	联大街	4	1.47	36.00	Chenggong
●	❘	Yikang South Road	谊康南路		1.42	37.42	Chenggong
●	❘	University Town	大学城		1.37	38.79	Chenggong
●	❘	University Town (South)	大学城南		2.36	41.15	Chenggong
	●	Municipal Administration Center	市级行政中心·清风		1.25	42.40	Chenggong
	●	Yihe Road	宜和路		0.89	43.29	Chenggong
	●	Bailongtan	白龙潭		1.88	45.17	Chenggong
	●	Kunming South Railway Station	昆明南火车站	4 KOM	1.25	46.42	Chenggong

== Gallery ==
Pictures of Line 1
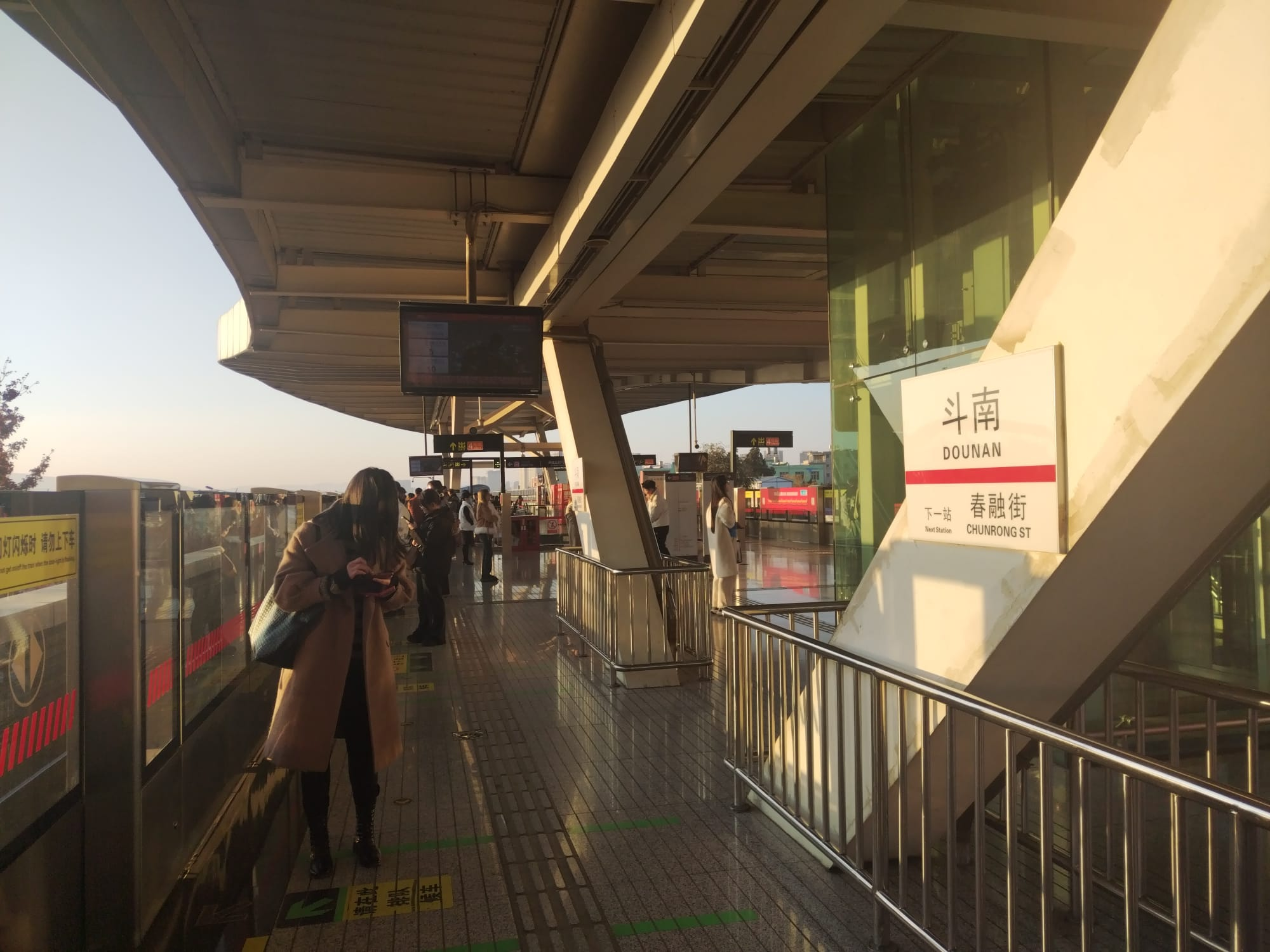
Platform at Dounan Station (Facing towards South Coach Station)

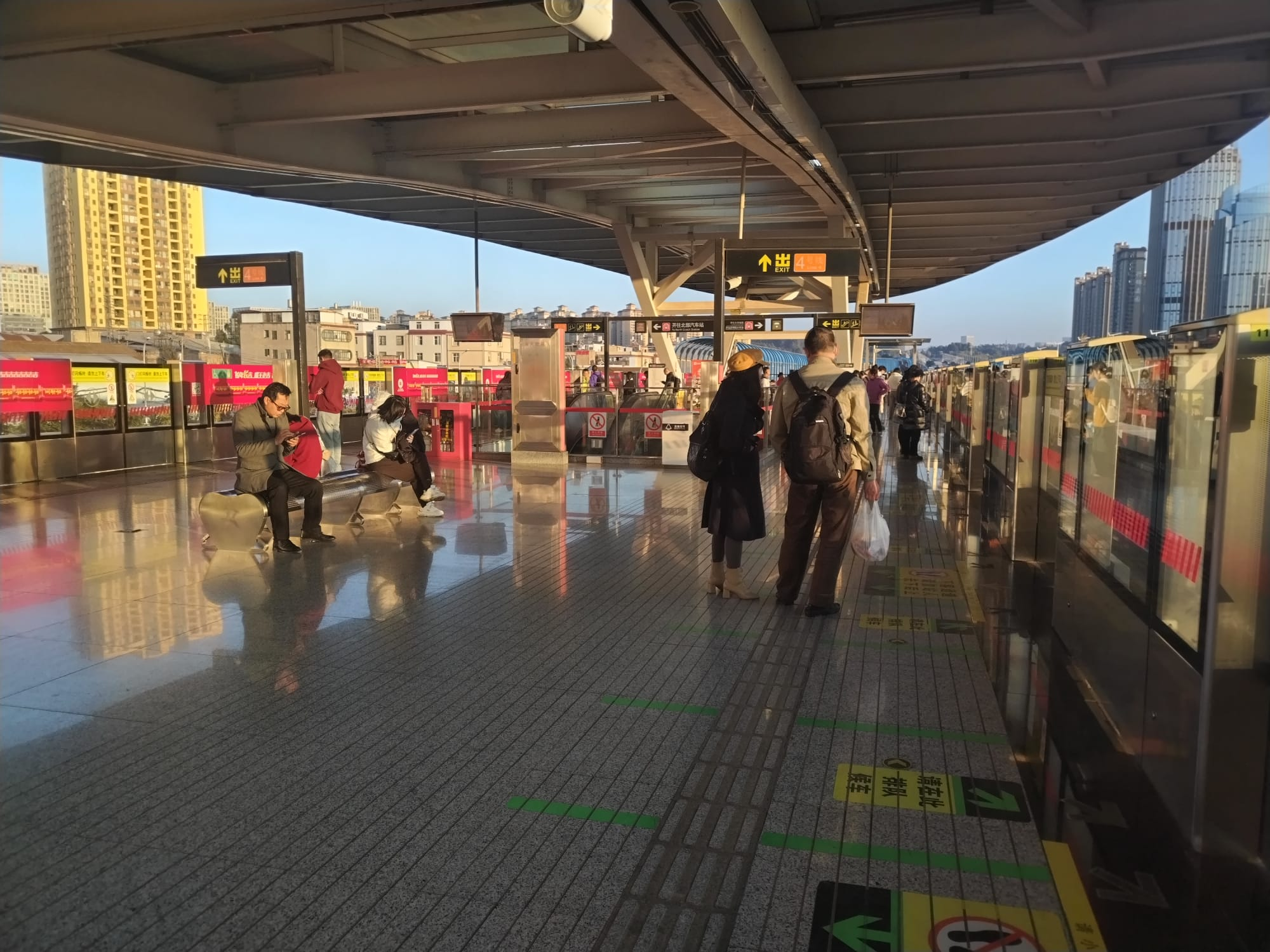
Platform at Dounan Station (facing towards Chunrong Street)

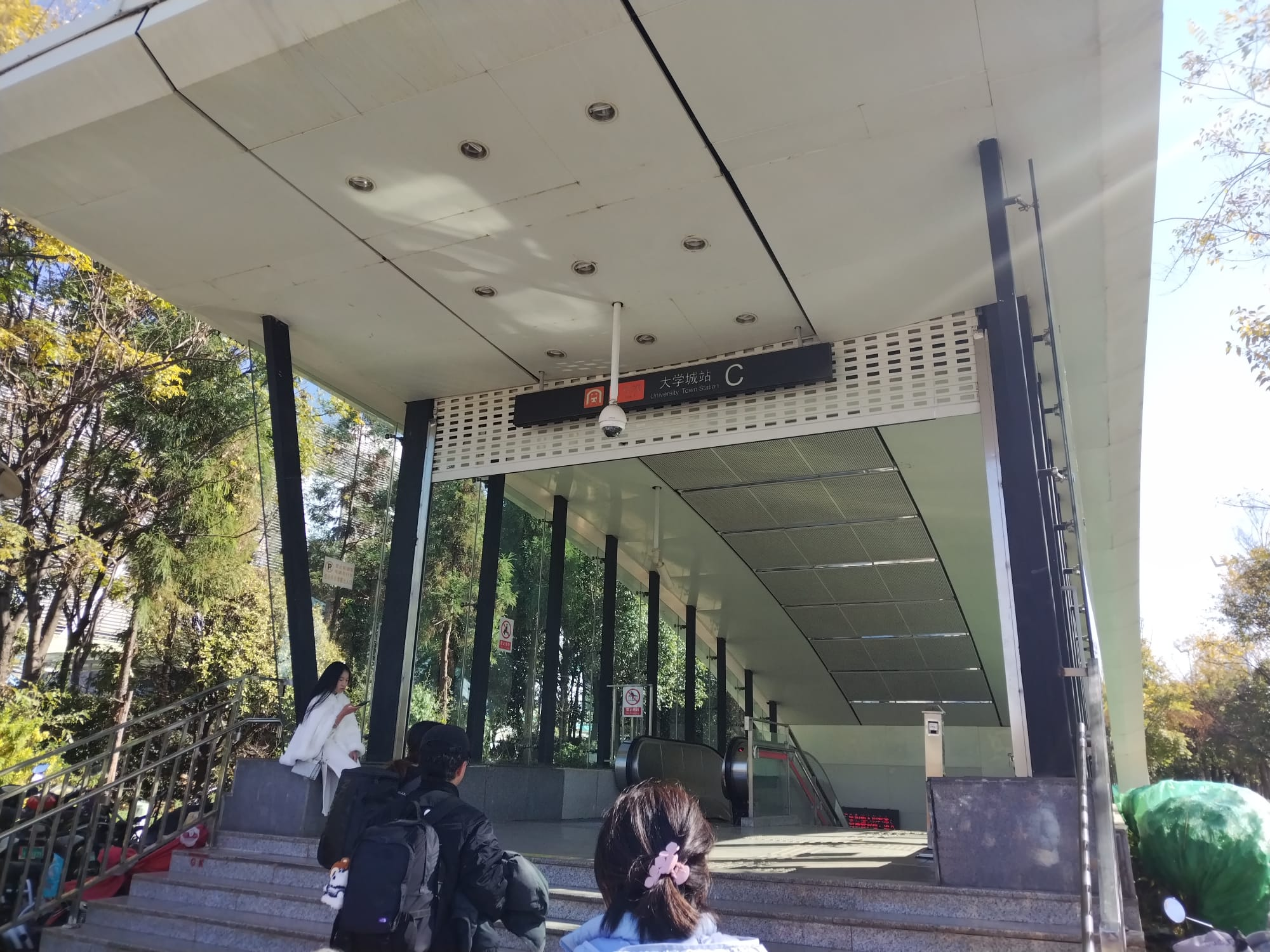
Exit C of University Town Station

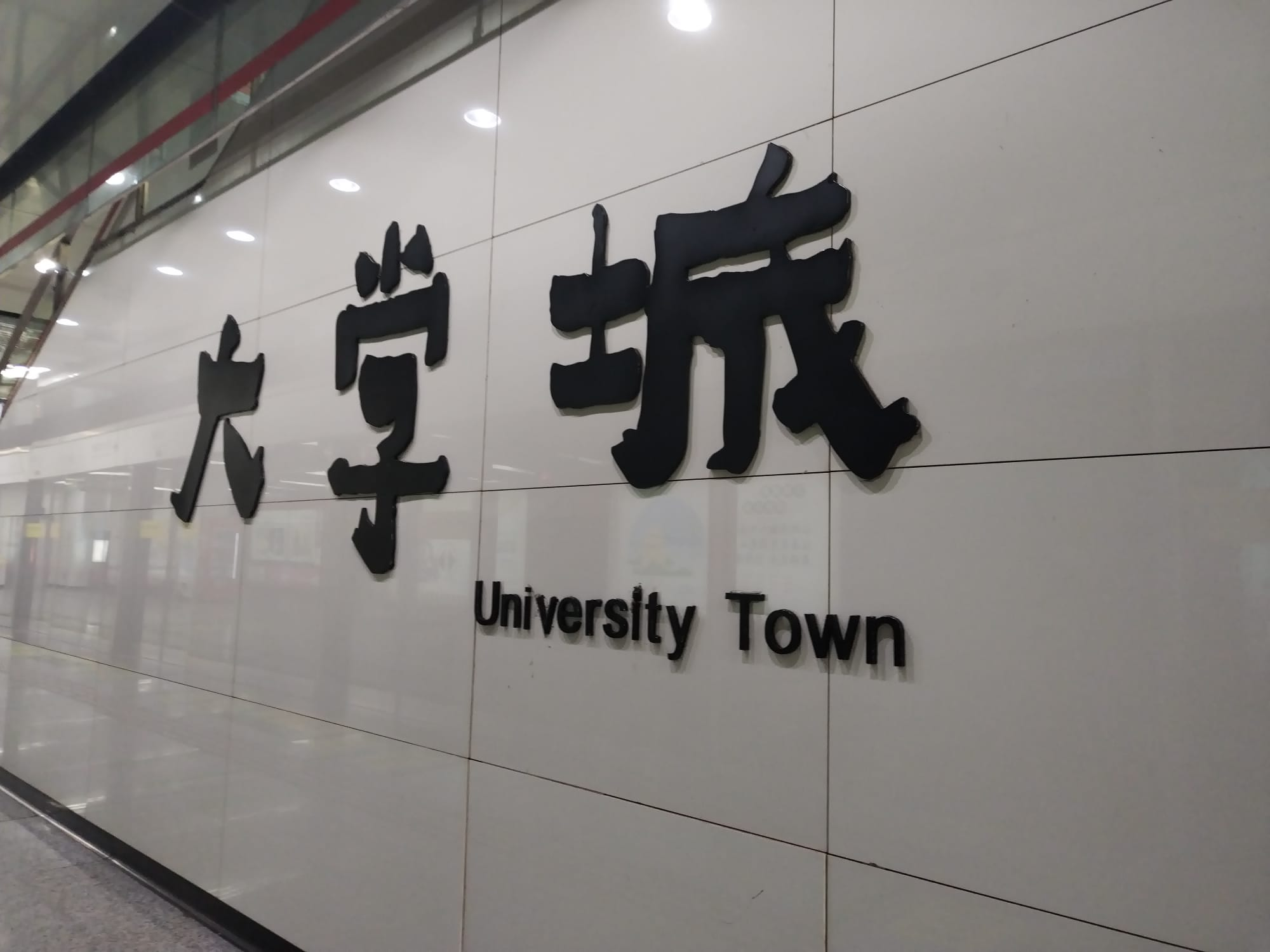
Station calligraphy at University Town

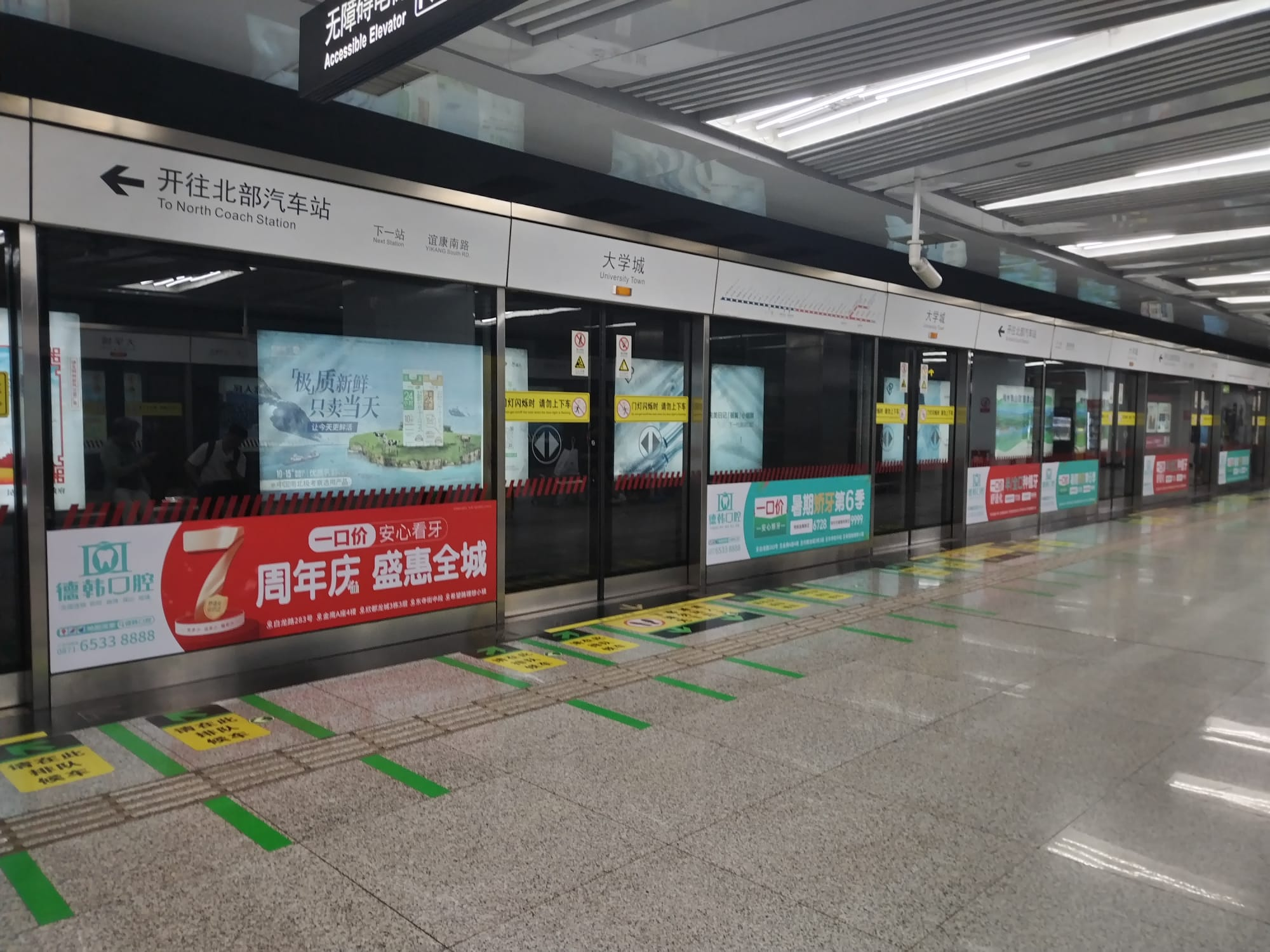
Platform at University Town Station

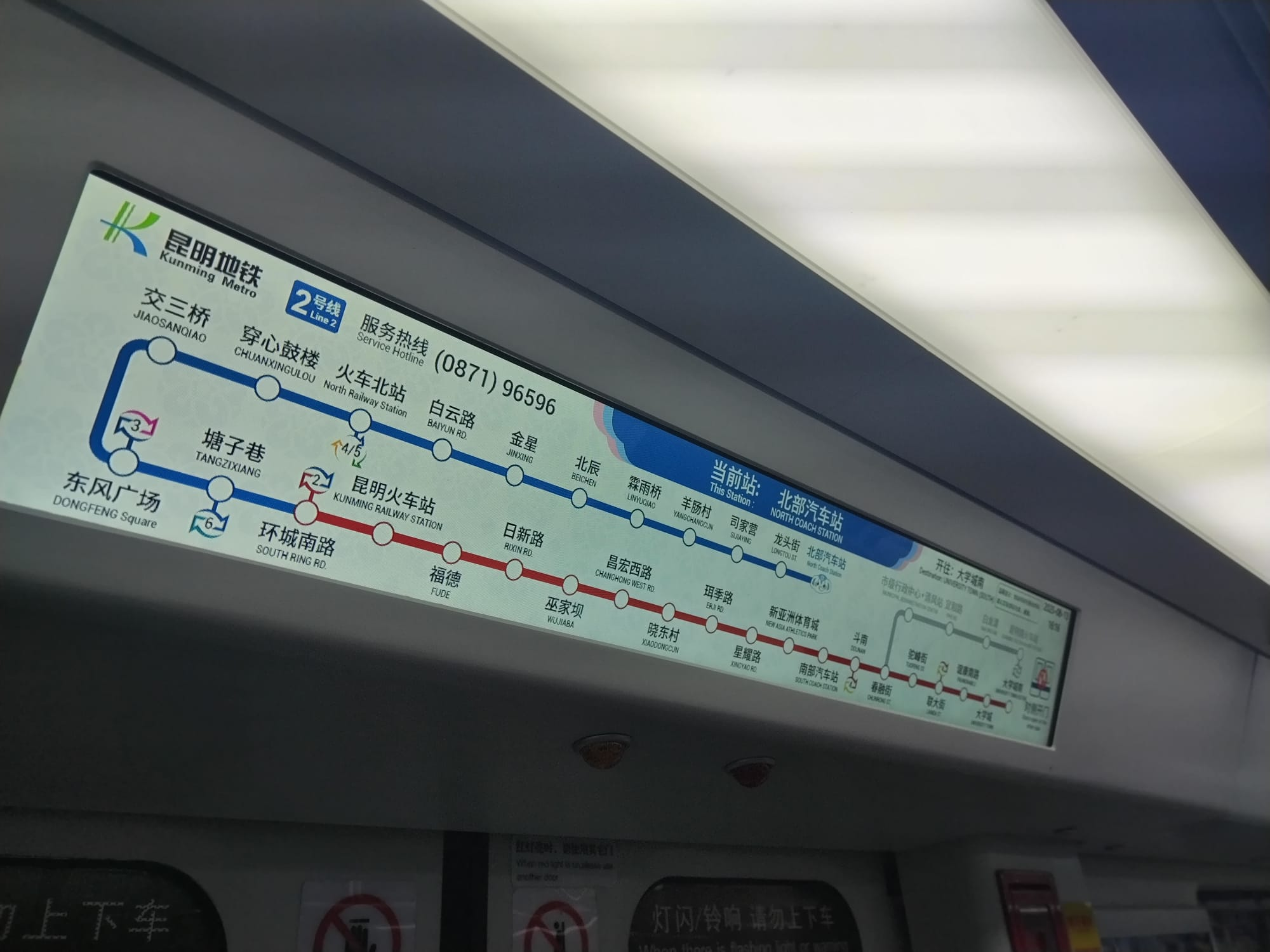
New LCD Route Diagram on a Line 1/2 train
