= Streptomyces guanduensis =

Scientific classification
- Domain: Bacteria
- Kingdom: Bacillati
- Phylum: Actinomycetota
- Class: Actinomycetes
- Order: Streptomycetales
- Family: Streptomycetaceae
- Genus: Streptomyces
- Species: S. guanduensis

Binomial name
- Streptomyces guanduensis Xu et al. 2006

Type strain
- 701, CGMCC 4.2022, CIP 109258, JCM 13274, NBRC 102070

Species of bacterium

Streptomyces guanduensis is an acidophilic bacterium species from the genus of Streptomyces which has been isolated from pine forest soil from Guandu in the Yunnan Province in China.

== See also ==
- List of Streptomyces species
