= South Ring Road station =

Metro station in Kunming, China

South Ring Rd. 环城南路
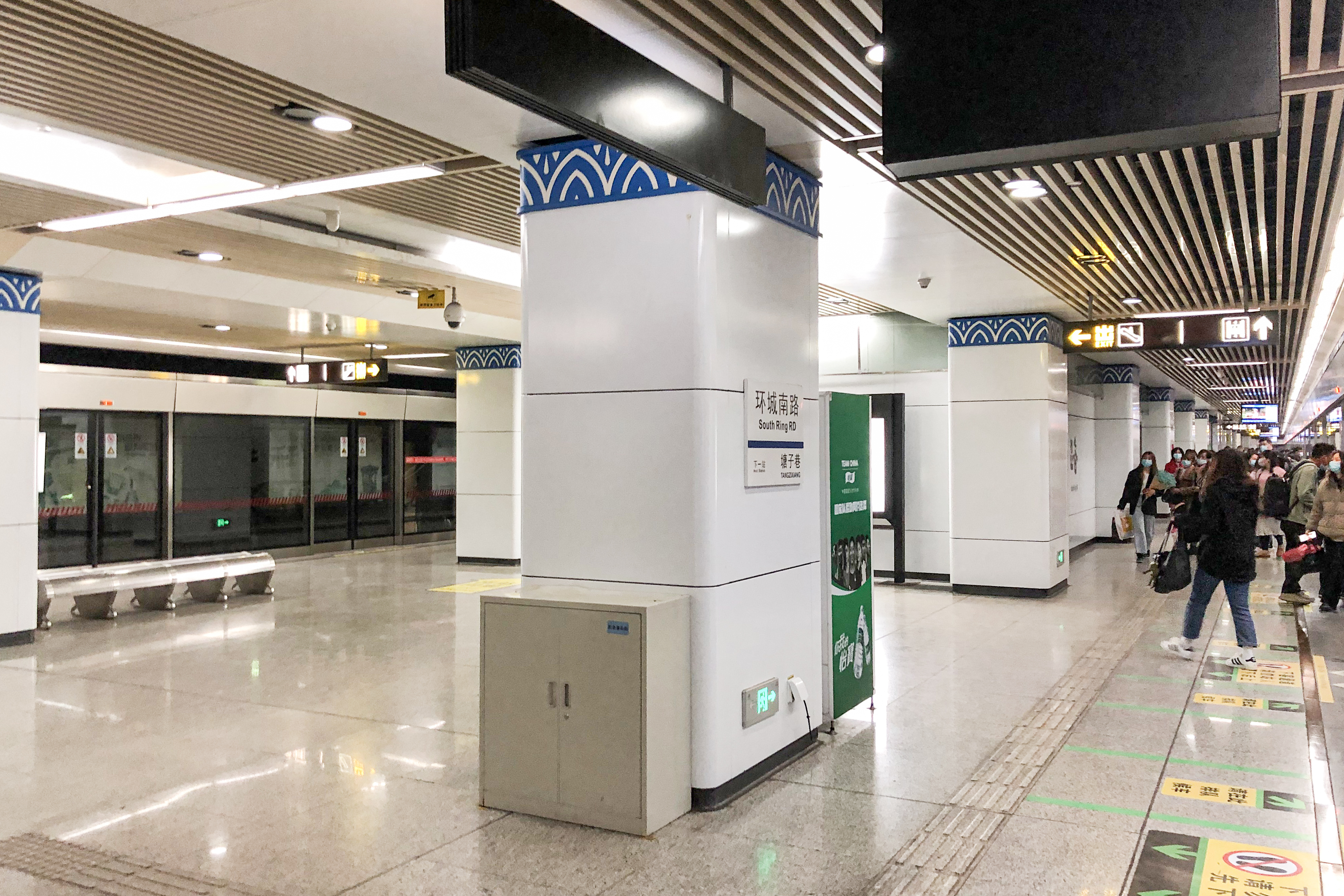

General information
- Location: Kunming, Yunnan; China
- Coordinates: 25°01′37″N 102°43′10″E
- Operated by: Kunming Rail Transit Corporation
- Lines: Line 1 (through operation to Line 2); Line 2 (through operation to Line 1)
- Platforms: 4 (2 island platforms)

Construction
- Structure type: Underground

History
- Opened: 30 April 2014

Services
Preceding station	Kunming Metro	Following station
Tangzixiang towards North Coach Station	Line 1 (through operation to Line 2)	Kunming Railway Station towards University Town (South) or Kunming South Railway Station
Tangzixiang towards North Coach Station	Line 2 (through operation to Line 1)	Kunming Railway Station towards University Town (South) or Kunming South Railway Station
Location

South Ring Road is a station on Line 1 and Line 2 of Kunming Metro in Kunming, Yunnan, China, which opened in 2014. It is located in Guandu District. Nevertheless, due to the through operation between the two lines, passengers currently do not need to transfer at this station.

== Station structure ==
The station has 2 island platforms, but only two platforms are currently in use, and the other two platforms are currently not in use. However, they will be put into service when Line 1 and Line 2 are separated in the future, serving Line 1 instead. On the other hand, the platforms currently in use will serve Line 2 only. Then, a same-direction cross-platform interchange will be provided between the two lines.

B1; Concourse	Exits, Customer service, Vending machines
B2; Platforms	1 reserved platform
B2; Platforms	Island platform
B2; Platforms	2 (through operation from 1 ) to North Coach Station (Tangzixiang)
B3; Platforms	1 reserved platform
B3; Platforms	Island platform
B3; Platforms	2 (through operation to 1 ) to University Town (South) or Kunming South Railway Station (Kunming Railway Station)
