= Line 4 (Kunming Metro) =

Metro line in Kunming, China

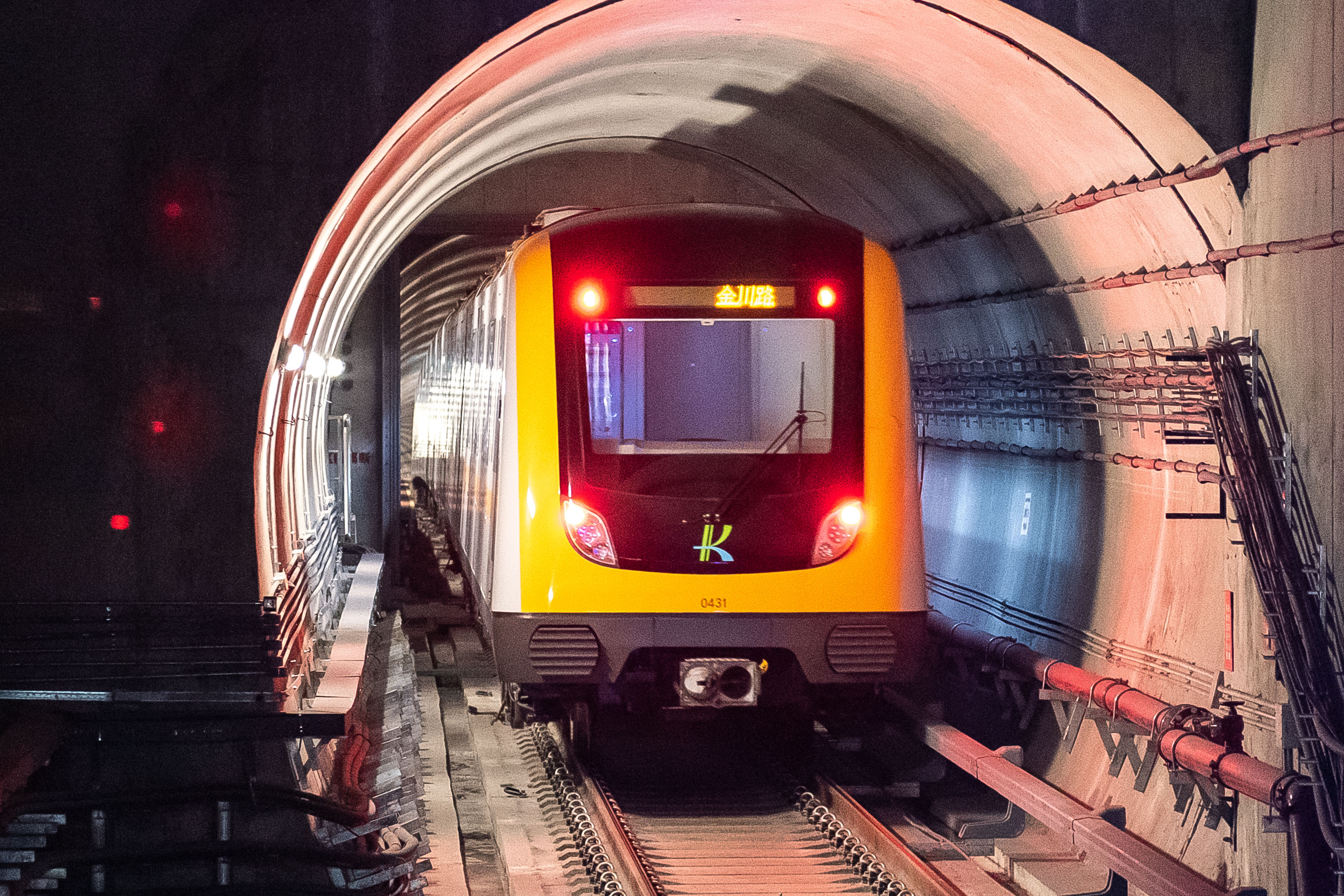
- Line 4 train leaving Lianda St. station

Overview
- Status: Operational
- Locale: Kunming, Yunnan Province, China
- Termini: Jinchuan Road; Kunming South Railway Station
- Stations: 29

Service
- Type: Rapid transit
- System: Kunming Metro
- Operator: Yunnan Jingjian Rail Transit

History
- Opened: 23 September 2020; 6 years ago

Technical
- Line length: 43.4 km (27.0 mi)
- Num of tracks: 2
- Track gauge: 1,435 mm (4 ft 8 1/2 in)

Line 4 is a rapid transit line on the Kunming Metro, serving the city of Kunming, China. The line has a total length of 43.4 km (27.0 mi) and 29 stations. It opened on 23 September 2020.

== Opening timeline ==
Segment	Commencement	Length	Station(s)	Name
Jinchuan Road — Kunming South Railway Station	23 September 2020	43.4 km (27.0 mi)	29	Phase 1

== Stations ==
Station Name		Connections	Distance km	Location
English	Chinese	Connections	Distance km	Location
Jinchuan Road	金川路			
Dahegeng	大河埂			
Haitun Road	海屯路			
Xiaotun	小屯			
Jindingshan North Road	金鼎山北路			
Sujiatang	苏家塘			
Xiaocaiyuan	小菜园			
North Railway Station	火车北站	2 5 KBM		
Bailong Road	白龙路			
Dashuying	大树营	3		
Juhuacun	菊花村			
Juhua	菊华	6		
Hedianying	和甸营			
Niujiezhuang	牛街庄			
Zhujiacun	朱家村			
Yangfutou	羊甫头			
Yuyuan Road	玉缘路			
Guangwei	广卫			
Tami	塔密			
Dounan	斗南	1		
Jingui Street	金桂街			
Meizicun	梅子村			
Gucheng	古城			
Kelecun	可乐村			
Xiangfeng Street	祥丰街			
Niutoushan	牛头山			
Lianda Street	联大街	1		
Wujiaying	吴家营			
Kunming South Railway Station	昆明南火车站	1 (branch); KOM		
