= Xishan, Kunming =

Coordinates: 25°02′13″N 102°39′29″E

Xishan 西山区
- District
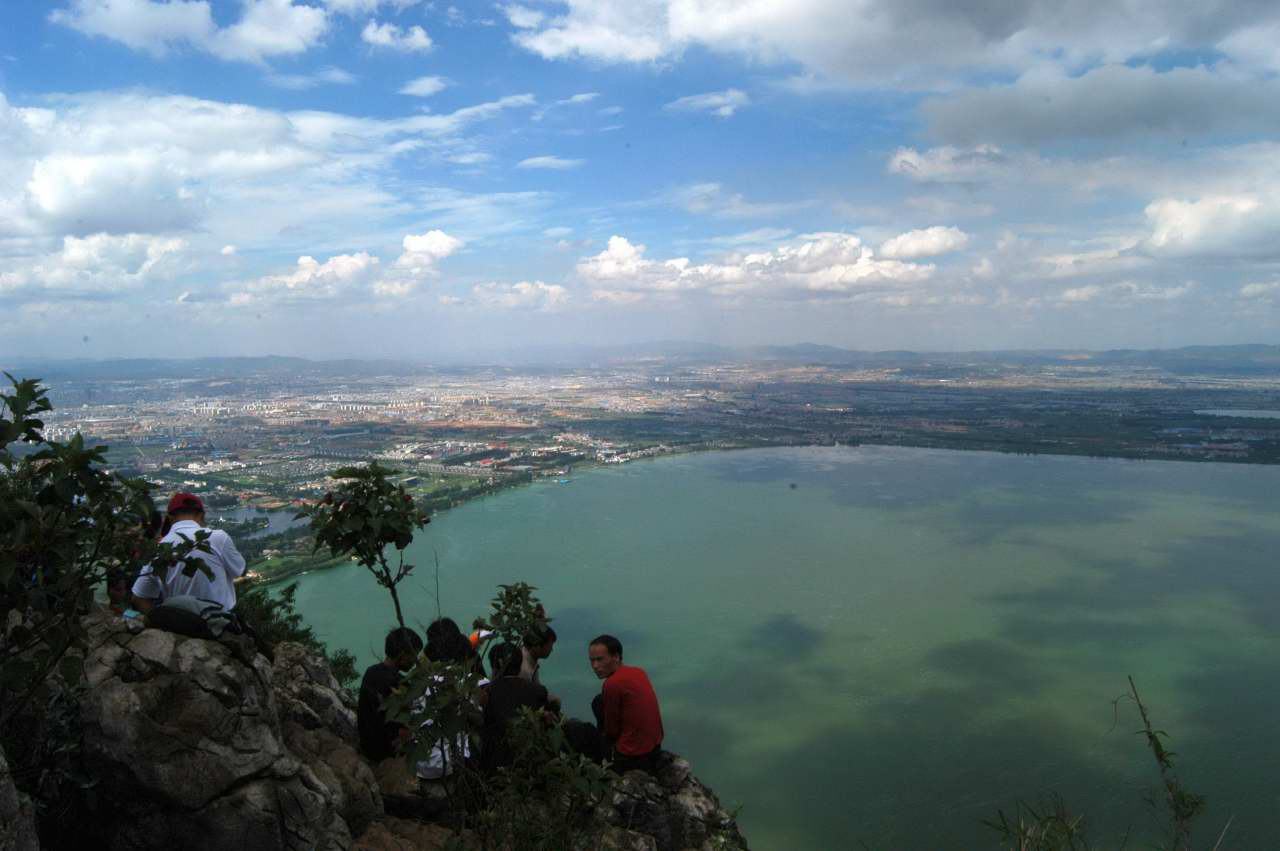
- On top of Xishan looking into Dian Lake

- Location of the Xishan District (red) and Kunming City (pink) within Yunnan
- Country: People's Republic of China
- Province: Yunnan
- Prefecture-level city: Kunming
- Established: 1956

Area
  - Total: 791 km^{2} (305 sq mi)

Population (2020)
  - Total: 960,746
  - Density: 1,210/km^{2} (3,150/sq mi)
- Time zone: UTC+8 (CST)
- Postal code: 650100 Area Code and Postal Code in Yunnan Province
- Area code: 0871
- Website: Website

Xishan District (Chinese: 西山区; pinyin: Xīshān Qū) is one of seven districts of the prefecture-level city of Kunming, the capital of Yunnan Province, Southwest China. It borders Wuhua District to the east and north, Guandu District and Chenggong District across Dianchi Lake to the east, Jinning District to the south, Anning and Lufeng to the west and Fumin County and to the north.

Xishan District occupies the western bank of Dian Lake. It takes its name from the Western Mountains (Xishan) located within the district.

== Administrative divisions ==
Majie, Jinbi, Yongchang, Qianwei, Fuhai, Zongshuying and Xiyuan Sub-district Offices, Biji Town, Haikou Town and Tuanjie Town

== Ethnic groups ==
The Xishan District Ethnic Gazetter (2009:22) lists the following ethnic Yi subgroups.

- Nasu 纳苏 or Nasi 纳斯 (Black Yi 黑彝)
- Suoni 索尼 or Suowei 索围 (White Yi 白彝)

== Notable locations ==
- Kunming Haikou Industrial Park
- Kingdom of the Little People and World Butterfly Ecological Garden
