= Panlong, Kunming =

Panlong 盘龙区
- District
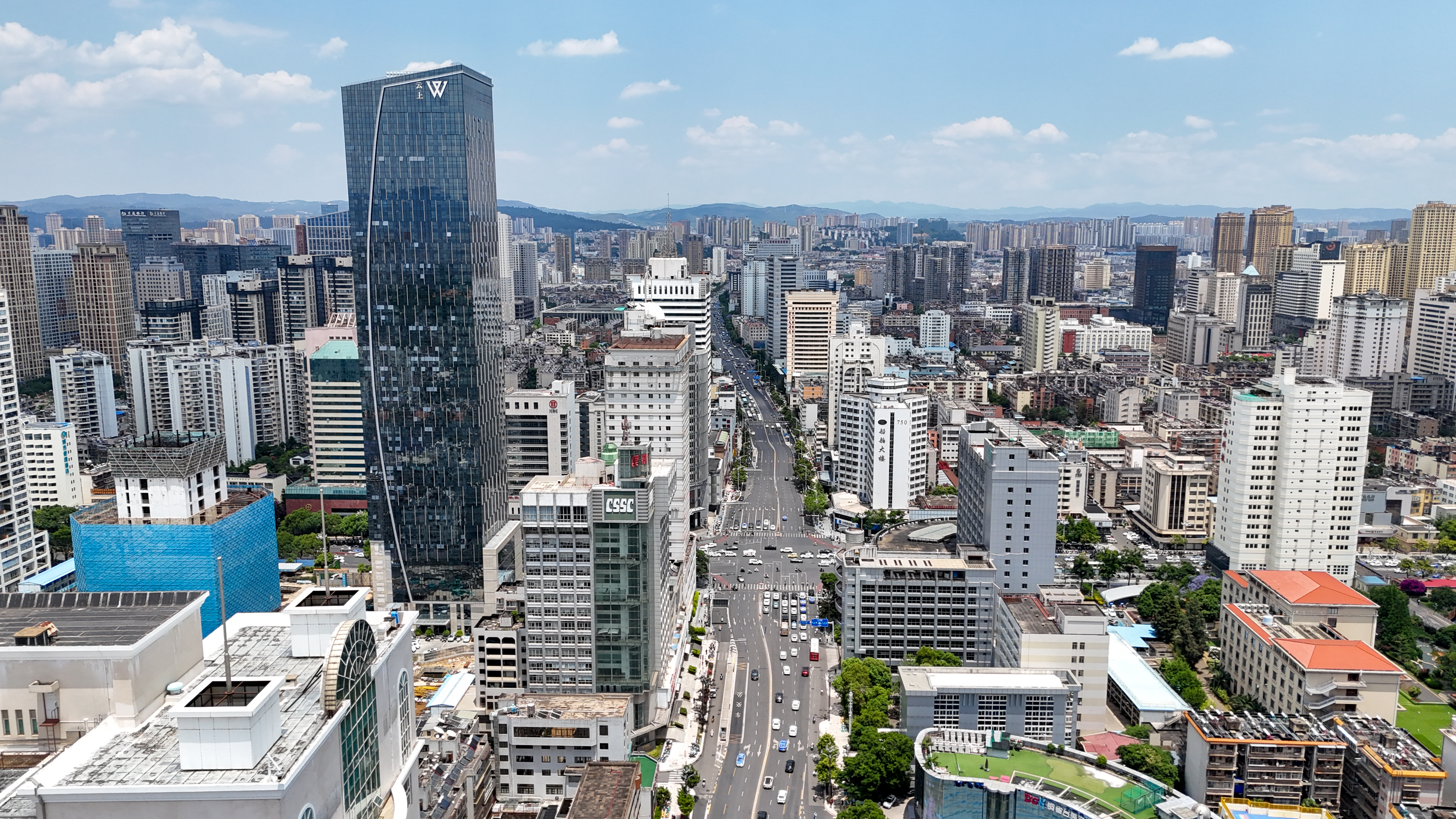
- Panlong's Skyline

- Location of the Panlong District (red) and Kunming City (pink) within Yunnan province of China

- Location of the county seat in Yunnan Panlong (China)
- Coordinates: 23°32′20″N 104°19′08″E
- Country: China
- Province: Yunnan
- Prefecture-level city: Kunming
- Established: October 1956
- District seat: Longquan Subdistrict

Area
  - Total: 340 km^{2} (130 sq mi)

Population (2020)
  - Total: 987,955
  - Density: 2,900/km^{2} (7,500/sq mi)
- Time zone: UTC+8 (CST)
- Postal code: 650000
- Area code: 0871
- Website: www.kmpl.gov.cn

Panlong District (simplified Chinese: 盘龙区; traditional Chinese: 盤龍區; pinyin: Pánlóng Qū) is one of seven districts of the prefecture-level city of Kunming, the capital of Yunnan Province, Southwest China.

== Geography ==
Panlong District is located in the northeast of Kunming in northeastern Yunnan. It borders Songming County and Guandu District to the south and east, Wuhua District across the Panlong River to the southwest, Fumin County to the northwest and Xundian County to the north.

== Administrative divisions ==
Panlong District is divided to 12 subdistricts:

Tuodong (拓东街道), Gulou (鼓楼街道), Donghua (东华街道), Lianmeng (联盟街道), Jinchen (金辰街道), Qingyun (青云街道), Longquan (龙泉街道), Ciba (茨坝街道), Shuanglong (双龙街道), Songhua (松华街道), Dianyuan (滇源街道), Aziying (阿子营街道).

== Demography ==
Panlong District stretches from Kunming's downtown area to the city's northern ring road. Recent boundary changes to accommodate the city's rapid growth have left the district with a population of around 700,000 people (as of 2006). Slightly more than half of them are permanent residents; 160,000 are rural migrants registered with the authorities as temporary residents, and a further 160,000 or so are ‘floating’ migrants with no formal registration in the locality. The migrants come from Yunnan's rural areas, as well as from Sichuan, Jiangsu, Hebei, Xinjiang and Guizhou.
