= Wuhua, Kunming =

Coordinates: 25°02′24″N 102°42′29″E

Wuhua 五华区
- District
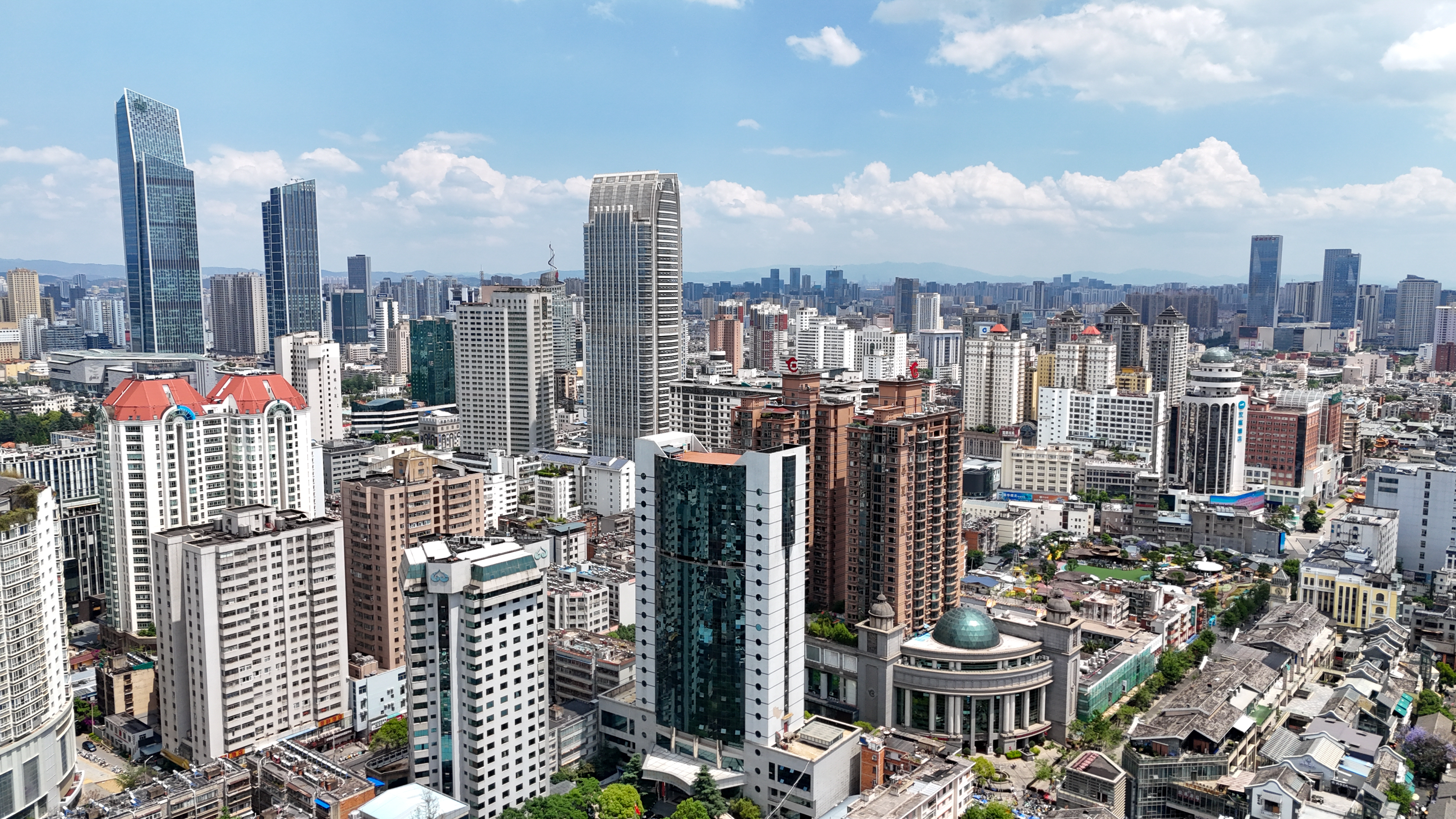
- Central Kunming in Wuhua

- Location of Wuhua District (red) and Kunming City (pink) within Yunnan
- Country: People's Republic of China
- Province: Yunnan
- Prefecture-level city: Kunming
- Established: October 1956

Area
  - Total: 397.86 km^{2} (153.61 sq mi)

Population (2020)
  - Total: 1,143,085
  - Density: 2,873.1/km^{2} (7,441.3/sq mi)
- Time zone: UTC+8 (CST)
- Postal code: 650000
- Area code: 0871
- Website: www.kmwh.gov.cn

Wuhua District (simplified Chinese: 五华区; traditional Chinese: 五華區; pinyin: Wǔhuá Qū) is one of seven districts of the prefecture-level city of Kunming, the capital of Yunnan Province, Southwest China.

== Administrative divisions ==
Huguo, Huashan, Daguan, Longxiang, Lianhua, Fengning, Hongyun, Helinpu and Puji Sub-district Offices, Shalang Bai Nationality Village and Changkou Village.
