= Guandu, Kunming =

Coordinates: 25°00′16″N 102°45′09″E

Guandu 官渡区
- District
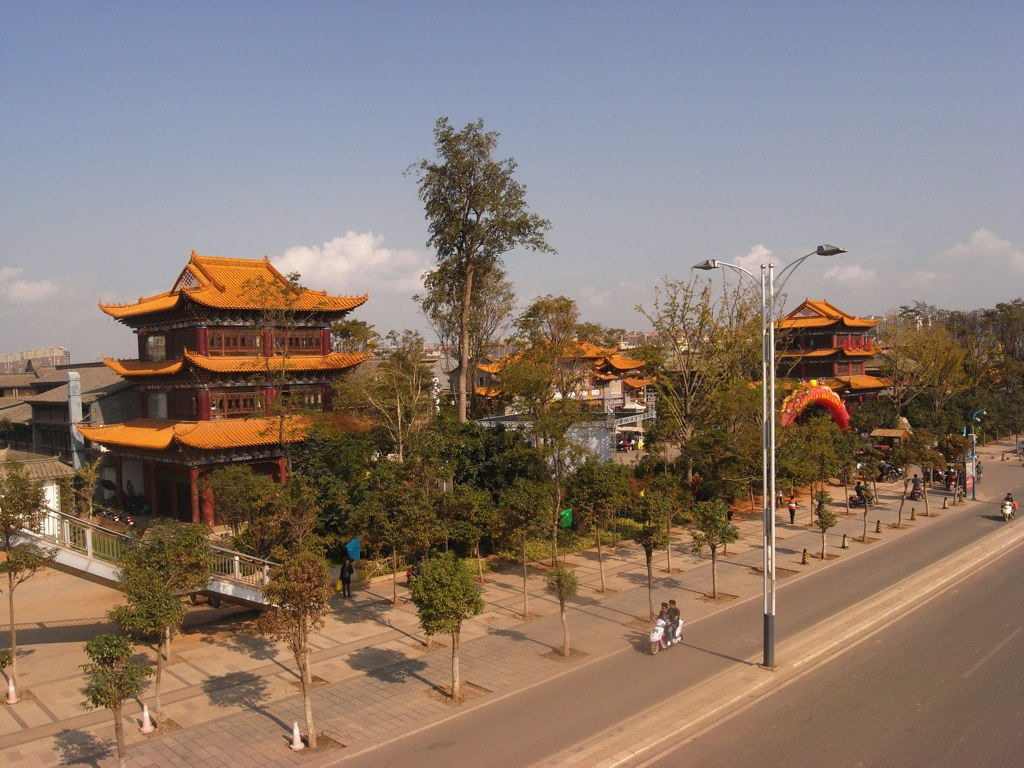
- Guandu Old Town

- Location of the Guandu District (red) and Kunming City (pink) within Yunnan province
- Country: People's Republic of China
- Province: Yunnan
- Prefecture: Kunming
- Established: 1956

Area
  - Total: 552 km^{2} (213 sq mi)

Population (2020)
  - Total: 1,602,279
  - Density: 2,900/km^{2} (7,520/sq mi)
- Time zone: UTC+8 (CST)
- Postal code: 650200
- Area code: 0871
- Website: http://www.guandu.gov.cn/

Guandu District (Chinese: 官渡区; pinyin: Guāndù Qū) is one of seven districts of the prefecture-level city of Kunming, the capital of Yunnan Province, Southwest China. It is in the southeast of Kunming and borders Yiliang County, Kunming to the east, Chenggong District to the south, Songming County to the north and Panlong District and Xishan District to the west.

== Administrative divisions ==
Wujing, Taihe, Guanshang, Jinma, Guandu, Xibanqiao, Liujia and Yiliu Subdistricts in Dabanqiao Town and Ala Yi Nationality Township.
