= Songxi railway station =

Railway station in Nanping, Fujian

Songxi 松溪

General information
- Location: Songxi County, Nanping, Fujian; China
- Coordinates: 27.53678°N 118.82340°E
- Operated by: China Railway Nanchang Group
- Line(s): Quzhou–Ningde railway

History
- Opened: 27 September 2020

Songxi railway station (Chinese: 松溪站) is a railway station in Songxi County, Nanping, Fujian, China. It is an intermediate stop on the Quzhou–Ningde railway and was opened with the line on 27 September 2020. It is under the jurisdiction of China Railway Nanchang Group.

Preceding station	China Railway	Following station
Qingyuan towards Quzhou	Quzhou–Ningde railway	Zhenghe towards Ningde
