= Jinhua–Qiandaohu railway =

Railway line in Zhejiang, China

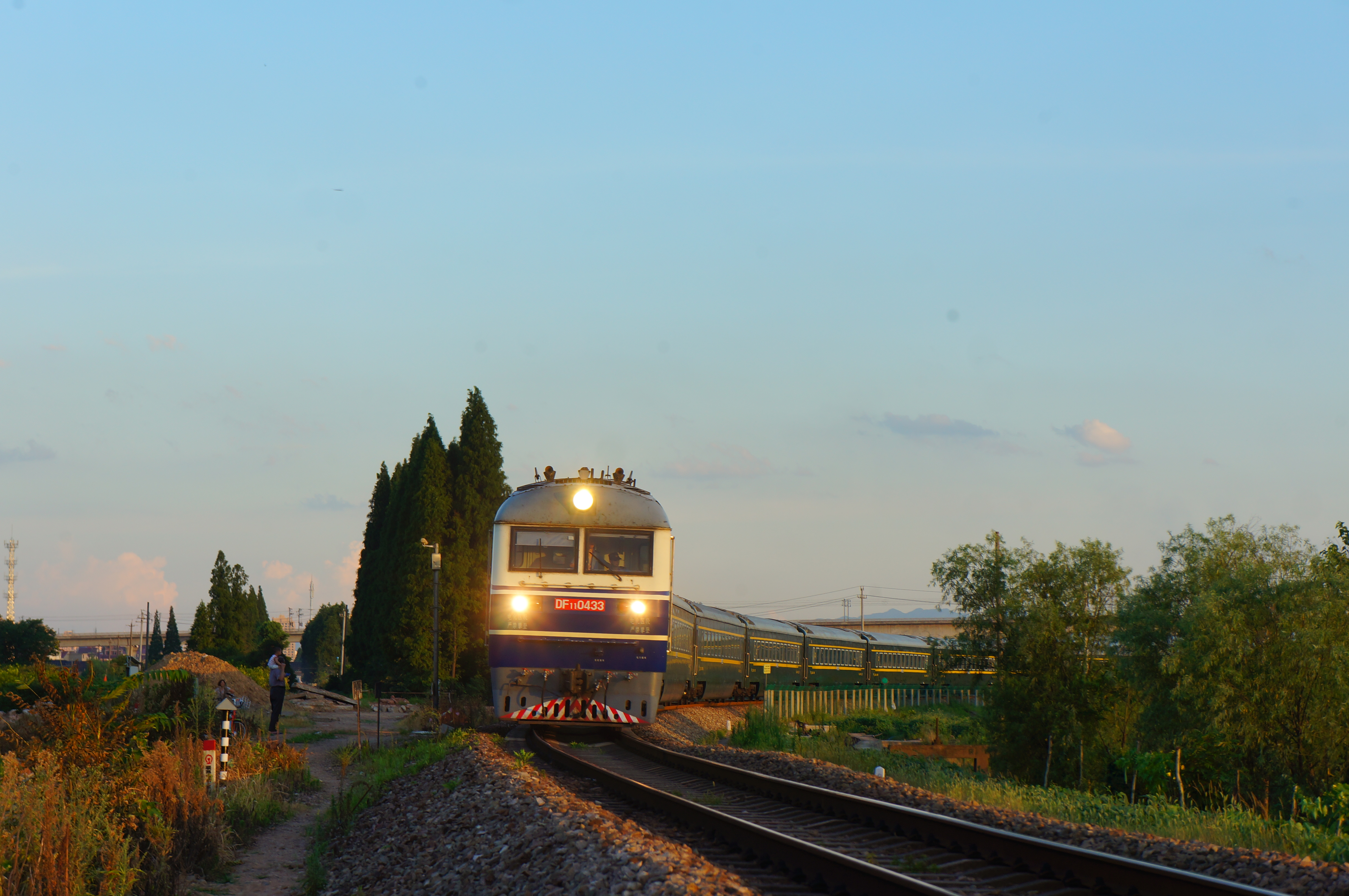

Overview
- Status: Operational
- Termini: Jinhua; Qiandaohu South

Service
- Type: Heavy rail

Technical
- Line length: 79 km (49 mi)
- Track gauge: 1,435 mm (4 ft 8 1/2 in) standard gauge

The Jinhua–Qiandaohu railway is a single-track branch railway in China which connects Jinhua to Qiandao Lake.

== History ==
The section from Jinhua to Lanxi was constructed between 1930 and 1932. The full route was not completed until 1957 and was used to carry materials for the Xin'an River Dam.

Services north of Lanxi railway station ceased in 2009. Since then, the only passenger services have been the daily service T7785 and T7786 between Hangzhou railway station and Lanxi.

A new freight handling facility opened at the northern end of the line in April 2016.

== Nearby railways ==
The Hangzhou–Huangshan intercity railway opened on 25 December 2018 with a stop serving Qiandao Lake, however it is situated to the north of the lake rather than the south. The planned high-speed Jinhua–Jiande railway will include a new station at Lanxi, Lanxi East.
