= Hedong Township, Fujian =

Hedong Township 河东乡
- Township
- Location in Fujian Hedong Township (China)
- Coordinates: 27°31′38″N 118°47′46″E
- Country: People's Republic of China
- Province: Fujian
- Prefecture-level city: Nanping
- County: Songxi
- Village-level divisions: 1 residential community 6 villages
- Elevation: 213 m (699 ft)
- Time zone: UTC+8 (China Standard)
- Area code: 0599

Hedong Township (simplified Chinese: 河东乡; traditional Chinese: 河東鄉; pinyin: Hédōng Xiāng; lit. 'river east') is a township of Songxi County in northern Fujian province, China, located about 6.3 kilometres (3.9 mi) west of the border with Zhejiang and adjacent to and east of the county seat. The township's name refers to its location east of a river, the valley of which this settlement is located in. As of 2018, it has one residential community (社区) and six villages under its administration.

== See also ==
- List of township-level divisions of Fujian
