= Quzhou–Ningde railway =

Railway line in China

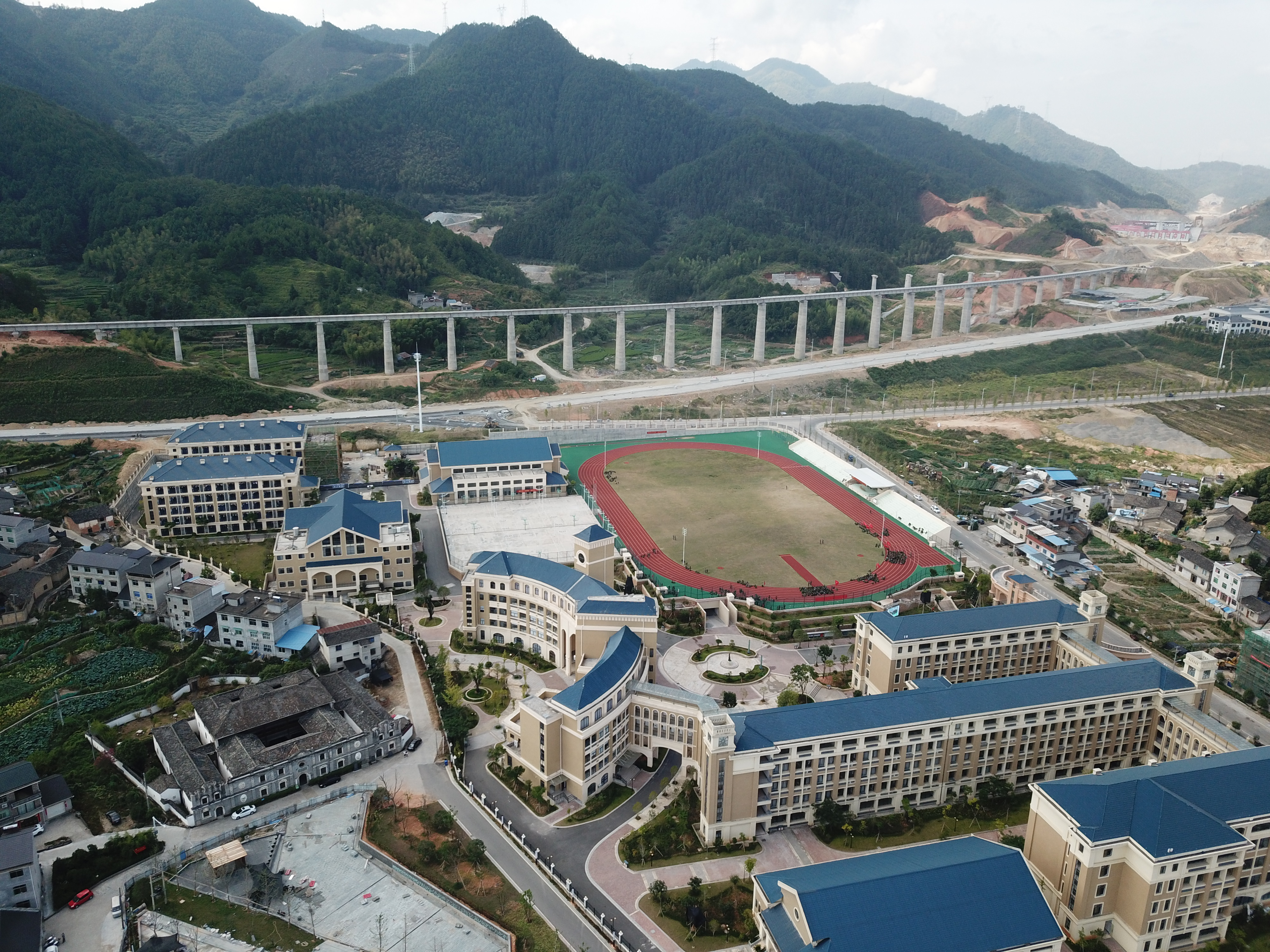

Overview
- Status: Operational
- Termini: Quzhou; Ningde
- Stations: 13

Service
- Type: Heavy rail

History
- Opened: 27 September 2020; 4 years ago

Technical
- Line length: 379 km (235 mi)
- Track gauge: 1,435 mm (4 ft 8 1/2 in) standard gauge
- Electrification: 50 Hz 25,000 V
- Operating speed: 160 km/h (99 mph)

The Quzhou–Ningde railway is a single-track electrified railway in China. The combined passenger and freight line is 379 kilometres (235 mi) long and has a design speed of 160 kilometres per hour (99 mph). The journey time is 5 hours and 27 minutes.

== History ==
Initially, the railway was expected to begin construction in 2011 and to have double-track with a line-speed of 200 kilometres per hour (120 mph). Construction on a single-track railway began in 2015. The line began operation on 27 September 2020.

== Stations ==
The line has the following passenger stations:

- Quzhou
- Longyou South
- Suichang
- Songyang
- Longquan City
- Qingyuan
- Songxi
- Zhenghe
- Jian'ou East
- Pingnan
- Zhouning
- Zhitishan
- Ningde
