= Jinhua railway station =

Railway station in Jinhua, China

Coordinates: 29°06′48″N 119°37′51″E

Jinhua 金华
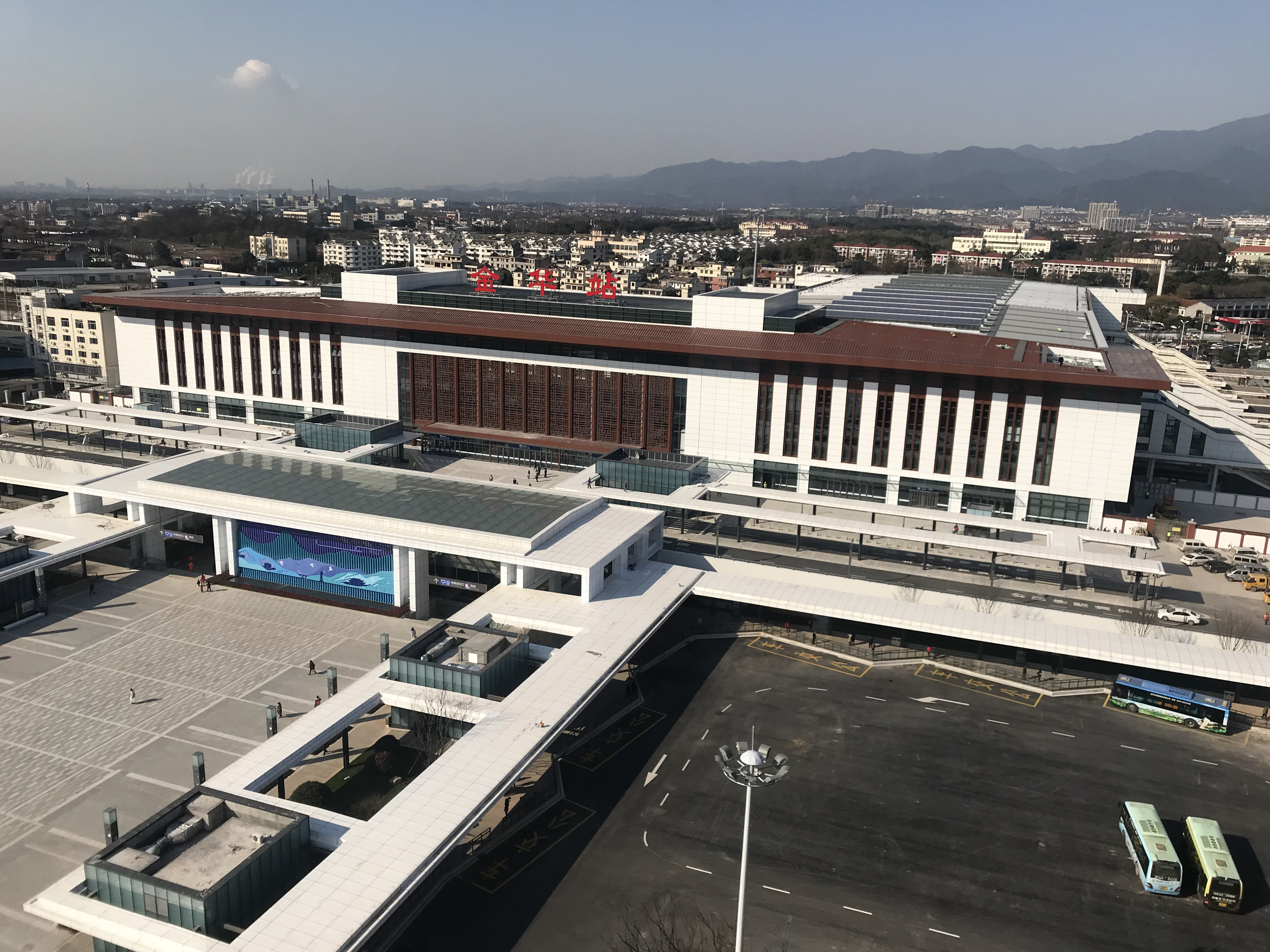
- Jinhua railway station

General information
- Location: Wucheng District, Jinhua, Zhejiang; China
- Operated by: Shanghai Railway Bureau China Railway Corporation
- Lines: Shanghai-Kunming railway; Jinhua–Qiandaohu railway; Hangchangkun Passenger Railway; Jinhua–Jiande high-speed railway (under construction)
- Platforms: 6
- Connections: Bus terminal

Other information
- Station code: TMIS code: 32587; Telegraph code: JBH; Pinyin code: JHU
- Classification: 1st class station

History
- Opened: 1932
- Previous names: Jinhuaxi (1996-2014)

Services
| Preceding station | China Railway High-speed | Following station |
|---|---|---|
| Yiwu towards Shanghai Hongqiao | Shanghai–Kunming high-speed railway | Longyou towards Kunming South |
| Terminus | Jinhua–Wenzhou high-speed railway | Jinhua South towards Wenzhou South |
| Preceding station | China Railway | Following station |
| Jinhua East towards Shanghai or Shanghai South | Shanghai–Kunming railway | Bailongqiao towards Kunming |
| Terminus | Jinhua–Qiandaohu railway | Zhumaguan towards Qiandaohu |
Location

Jinhua railway station (simplified Chinese: 金华站; traditional Chinese: 金華站; pinyin: Jīnhuá Zhàn), formerly Jinhua West railway station, is a railway station on the Shanghai-Kunming railway and the Hangchangkun Passenger Railway located in Wucheng District, Jinhua, Zhejiang, People's Republic of China.

== History ==
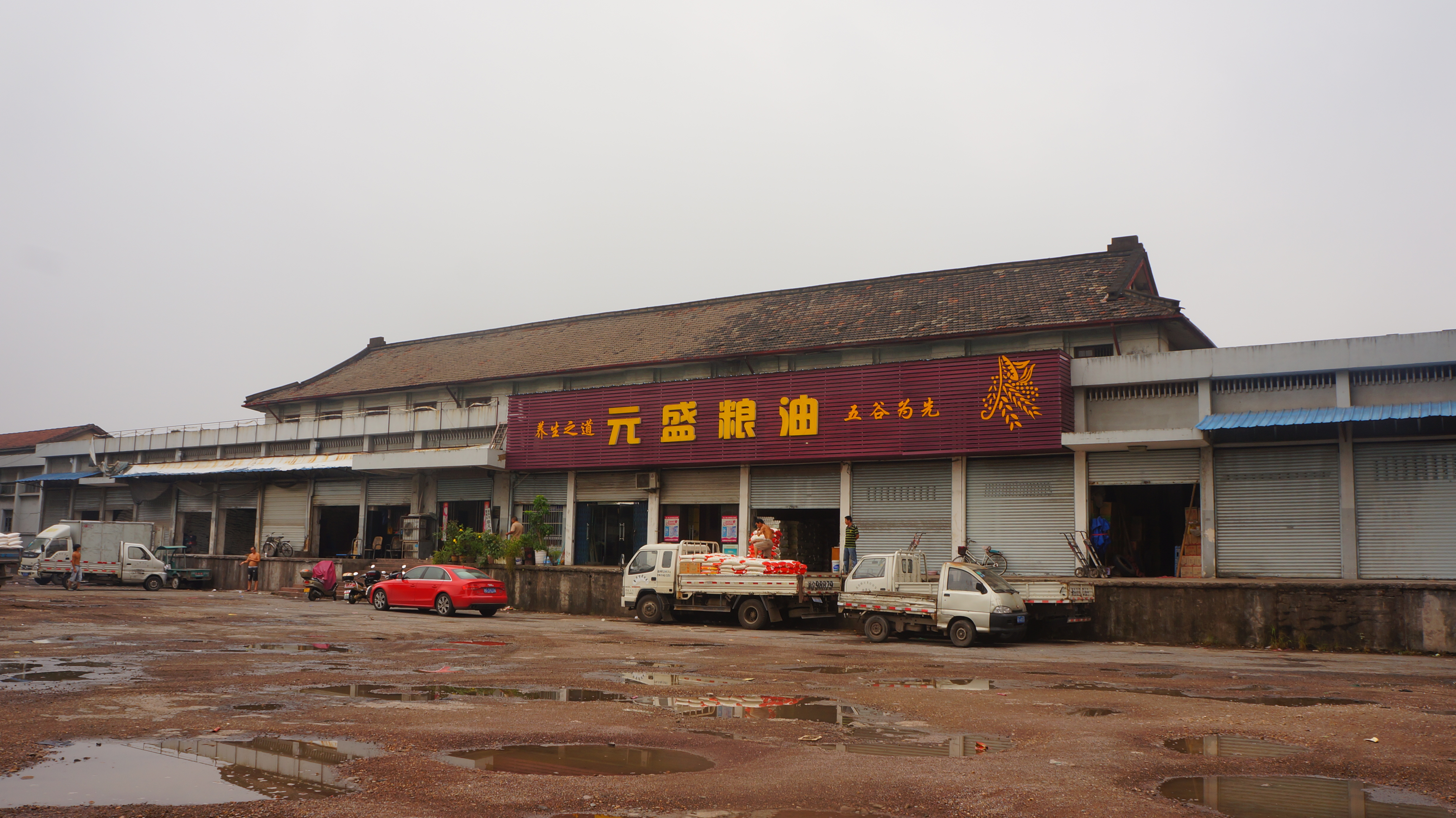
The old Jinhua railway station opened in 1932, it served as the main freight station after the opening of Jinhua West station until 2017.

The old Jinhua railway station, served as the main passenger station of Jinhua, was initially built in 1931, and was opened on February 15, 1932. The old Jinhua railway station was the First-class station on the former Zhejiang–Jiangxi railway, consisted of passenger facilities, freight facilities plus a classification yard. The 2-floor station building covered an area of 3,135 square meters.

== Metro connections ==
The station is served by Jinyidong line of Jinhua Rail Transit.

== Jinhua West railway station ==
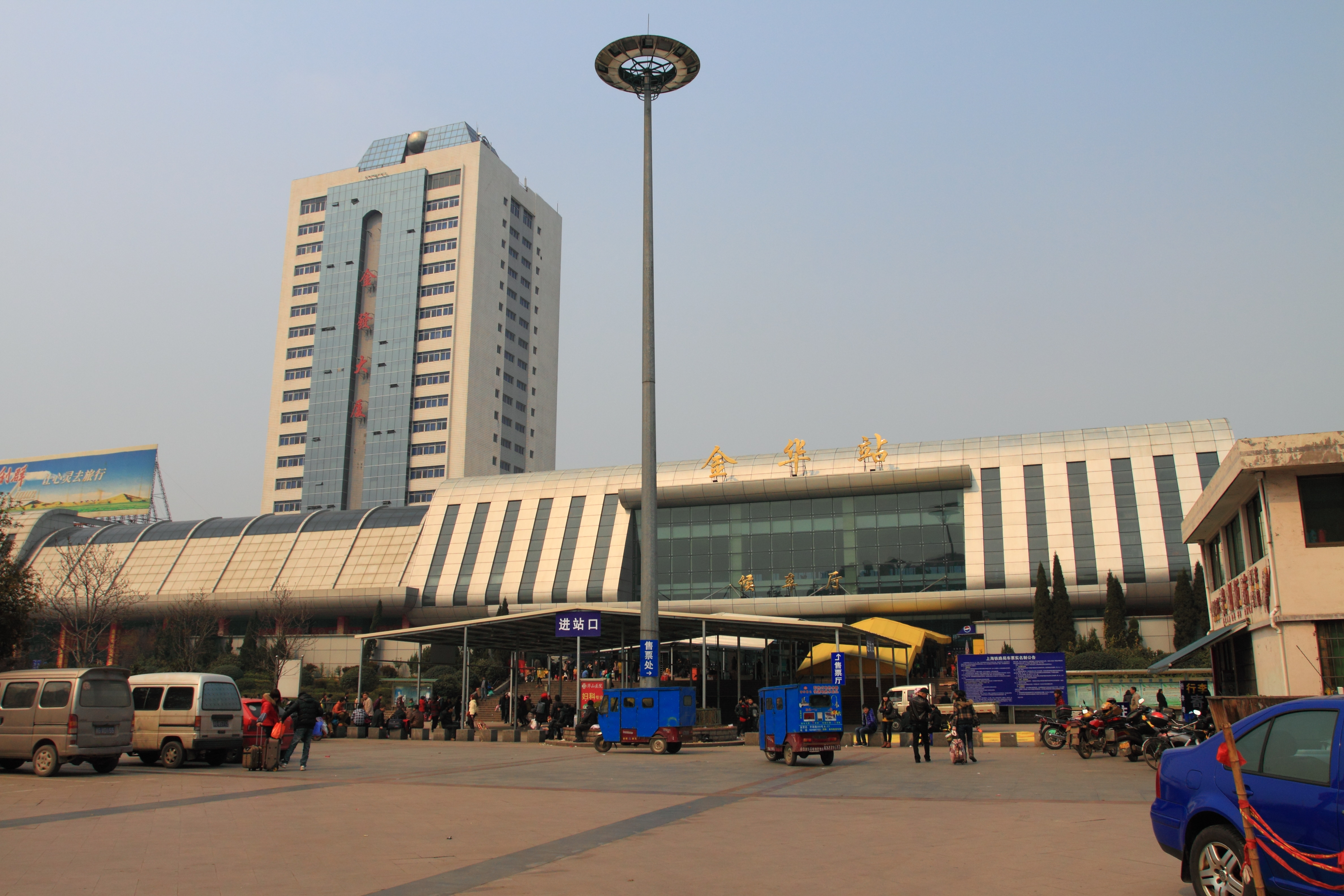
The station building of Jinhua West Station in 2012

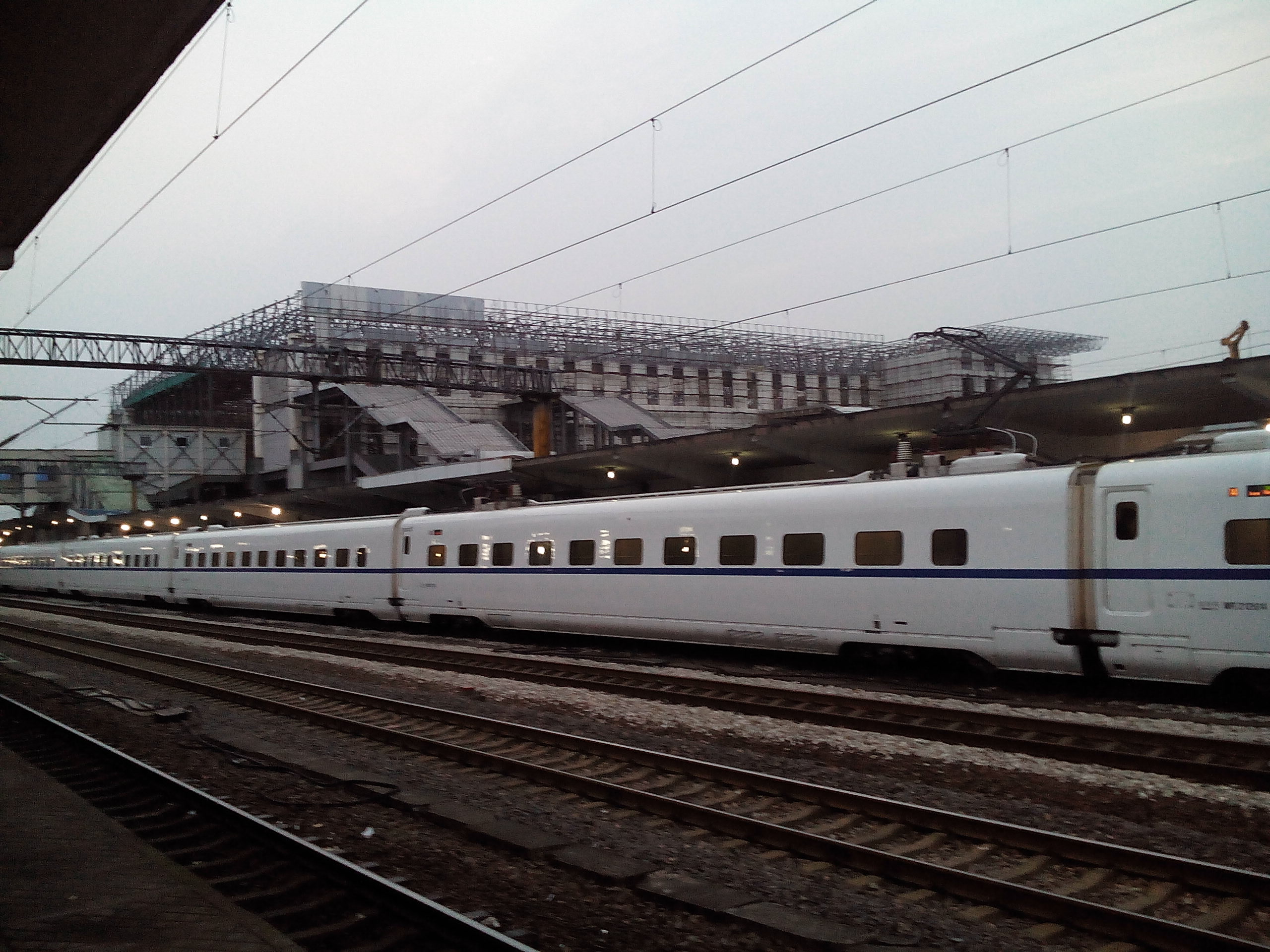
A high-speed train stopped at the ordinary train platform in 2014. The north station building behind was under construction.

The railway split the downtown Jinhua which severely had a negative impact on the road traffic due to the expansion of the Jinhua City. The Ministry of Railway initiated a plan to build a new passenger station in Wuliting, the northern part of the city in 1978. The Municipal Government of Jinhua reserved the land of 3,000 Mu in the West of the city as the proposed construction site in accordance to cooperate with the plan. However, the Ministry of Railway announced to suspend the plan for the new passenger station in Jinhua, given the reason of "lack of funding" in a conference held in November 1990. The Jinhua Government then began a massive campaign, including lobbying with stakeholders, members in National People's Congress (Yan Jici) and Political Consultative Conference in order to restart the plan for the new passenger station. The Planning Department of the Ministry of Railway finally "agreed to consider the plan for the construction of the Jinhua passenger station" on December 30, 1991, and the plan was get approved on April 27, 1992. The foundation stone for the new station was laid on December 19, 1992, and the construction was officially started on October 8, 1993. On January 26, 1996, the new station construction was completed and was named as "Jinhua West Railway Station" (Jinhuaxi Railway Station), along with the completion of the duplication construction of the Zhejiang–Jiangxi railway. The first train arrived was the Train 492 from Yingtan, while the first train leaving was departed on 10:10 AM. The station was officially opened on January 30, the first train arrived was the Train 180 from Nanning to Shanghai.The third track to the adjacent Jinhua East railway station was completed in 1999.

Jinhua West Railway station served as one of the important hubs on the former Zhejiang–Jiangxi Railway, all passenger trains had to change their locomotives at Jinhua West station. Excessive technical operations cause a reduction in traffic efficiency of the railway: there used to be 10 locomotives on a single track to wait to be coupled, and some trains had to make temporary stops at adjacent stations for hours to wait for the opening of available platforms. Starting on November 30, 2006, Shanghai Railway Bureau began the experiments of long-locomotive-routing from Hangzhou to Xiangtang to improve the efficiency of the tracks, six passenger trains did not have to change the locomotive here by the time.

The station started to elevate the platform heights at the end of 2006: platform 2 to 5, which were 300-millimeter heights, were elevated onto 1250-millimeter-height platforms in order to serve the high-floor high-speed EMU trains. There were several trains suspended their passenger services at Jinhua West in accordance with the elevation construction. The elevation construction was completed on January 15, 2007, and trains that their passenger services here were previously suspended were resumed. On April 18, the high-speed train stopped at Jinhua West station for the first time, it was Train D92 from Nanchang to Shanghai South traveled on the conventional Shanghai–Kunming railway.

The station started an upgrade construction between August 26, 2007, to January 6, 2008. The construction expanded the size of the waiting area to 4660 sq meters, numbers of the ticket counters from 12 to 24, re-decorated the interior and re-construct the bullet-train-like station building façade.

=== 2014 to Present ===
The Jinhua Government used to start a name switch proposal between Jinhua West Railway Station and the Old Jinhua Railway Station, which was still served as the main freight station in 2010. However, other than just change the station sign on the station building of the Jinhua West Station, the railway system still recognize it as "Jinhua West Station", as the name shown on the train schedules, train tickets, station announcements, information boards and the signs on the platforms still remained unchanged. China Railway Corporation ultimately approved the name-switch proposal on October 14, 2014: The Jinhua West Station (passenger station) and the old Jinhua Railway Station (freight station) switched the names effective from October 20, 2014. The signs on the platforms, plus signs on the platforms for the Hangzhou–Changsha HSR under construction were changed to "Jinhua". The North station building was opened on December 10 with the opening of Hangzhou–Changsha HSR. The comprehensive upgrading construction for the south station building was initiated after the opening of the high-speed rail. The first step of the reconstruction, the demolishment of Jinfa Tower which was located beside the south station building, was started on December 22.

The upgrade project planned to reconstruct the south station building, and build a new waiting room over the tracks. However, the reconstruction of the south station building, which was planned to start in February 2015, was postponed until 2017 due to the negotiation with the relative stakeholders and the difficulty in construction. The reconstruction was finally taken into place on February 28, 2017. The services of the ordinary passenger trains were suspended during the construction, but trains with technical operations still stopped at the station. The Jinhua Government recommended the passengers choose to take high-speed trains during the reconstruction; meanwhile, passenger services for ordinary trains that operate on Jinhua–Wenzhou railway were transferred to Jinhua South Railway Station, and the station offices were temporarily removed to the north station building.

The elevated waiting area completed its structural construction by the end of 2017, re-decorated platforms for ordinary trains were completed in January 2018. The entire construction was completed on December 18, 2018, and was reopened on 9 AM, December 2018. The ordinary train services were resumed on January 5, 2019. There was a tiny construction of the north station building entrance occurred in January 2019.

== Station Layout ==
=== Station Building ===
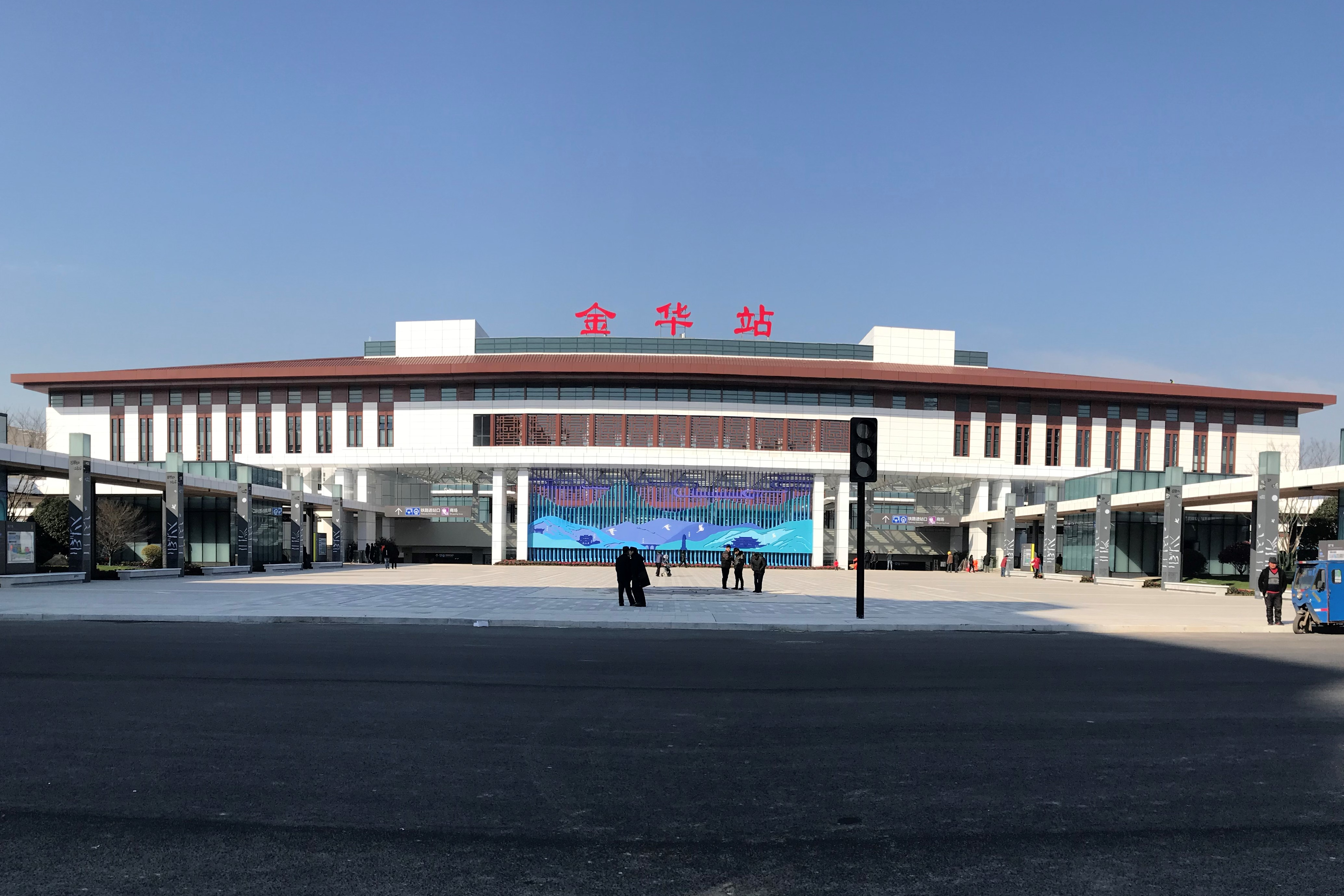
The Front of the south station building, with a landscape board featuring Mount Jianfeng, Wanfo Pagoda.

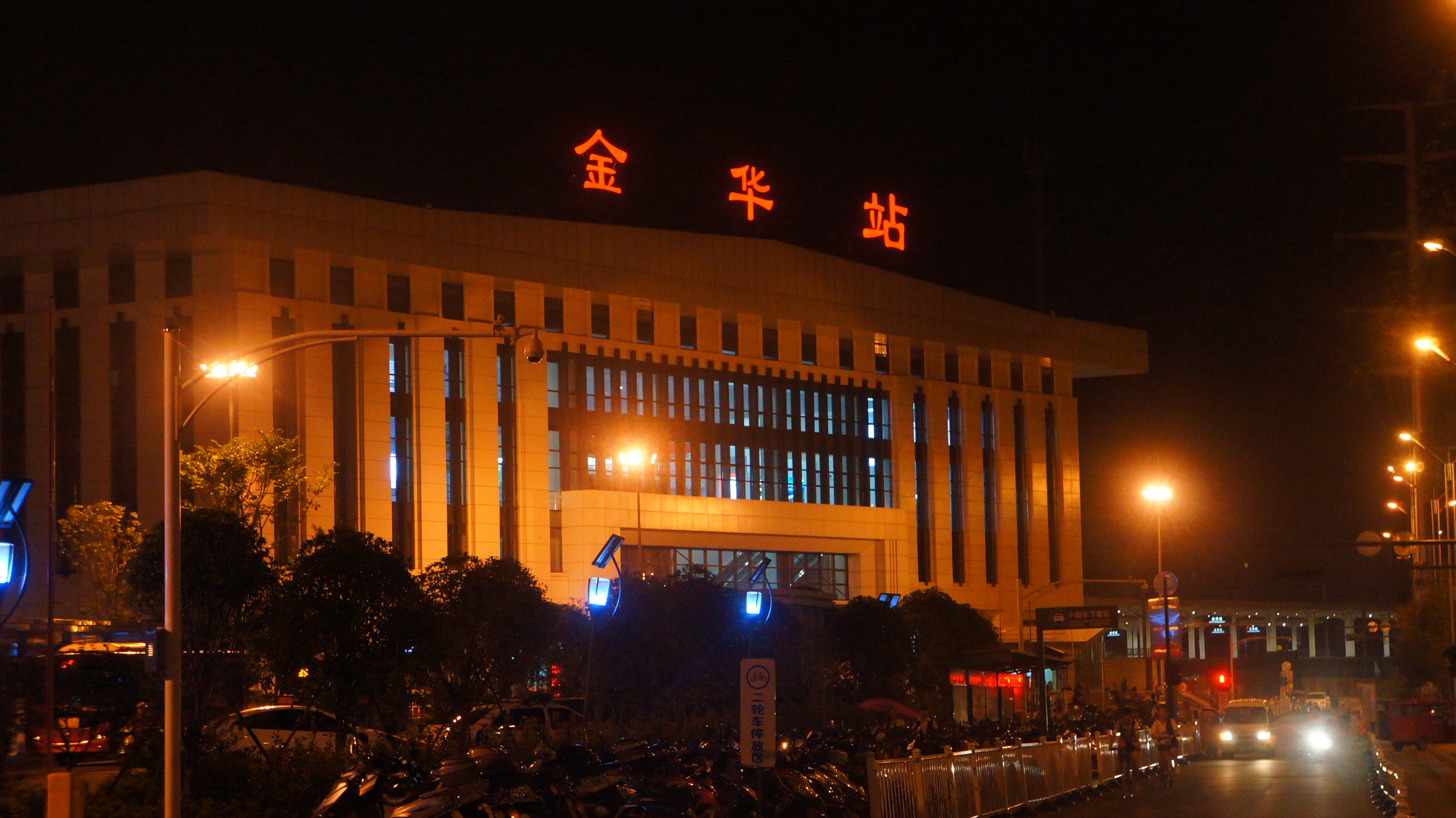
North station building.

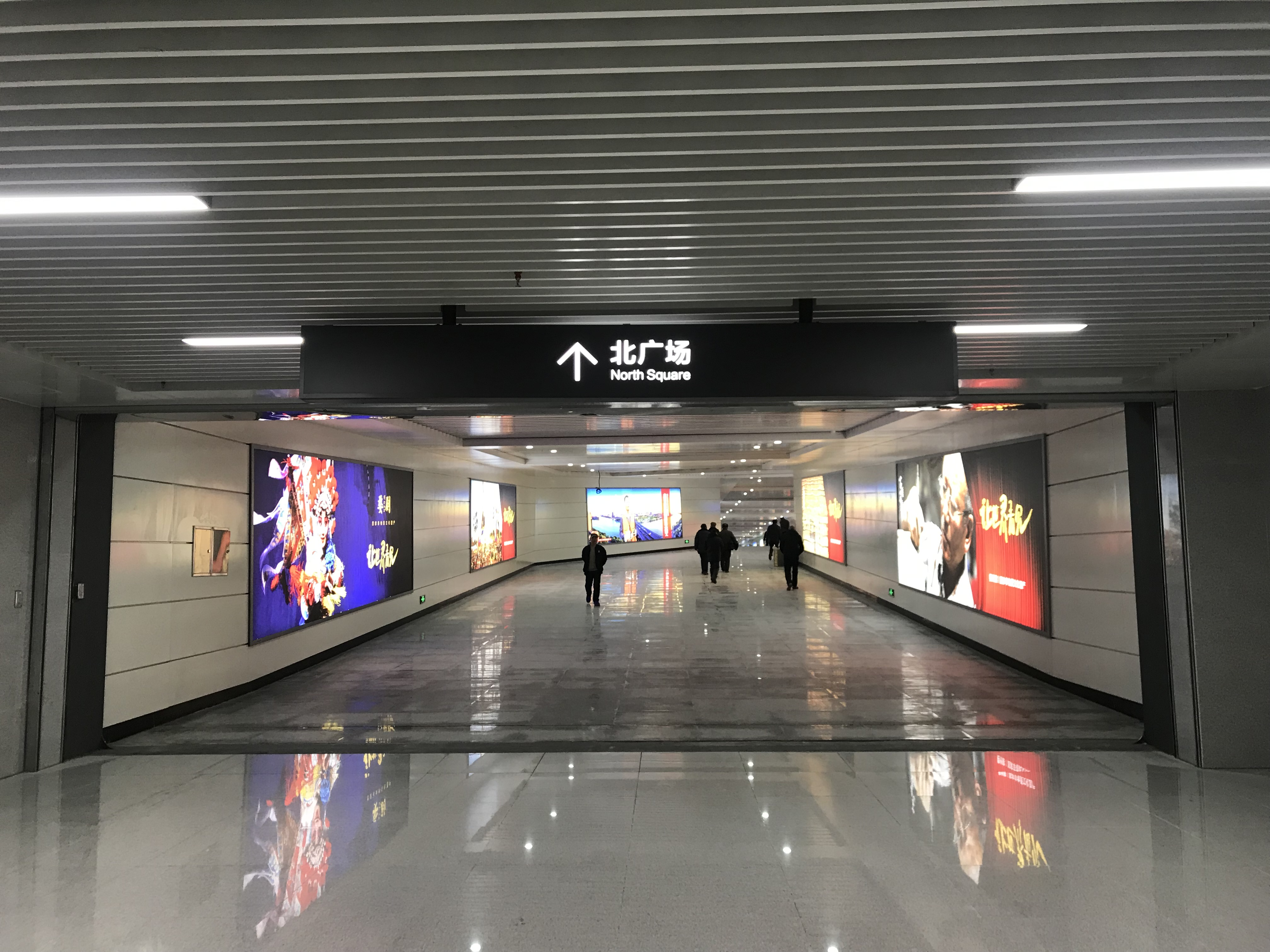
North-South underground outside the paid area.

The size for the entire station building of Jinhua is about 30,000 sq meter, that includes south station building, north station building plus the elevated waiting area over the platforms.

The south station building was opened on December 28, 2018, with the size of 13,450 sq meters. The station building features a giant gate, and was similar to the Chinese character "華". The design was originated from the idea "train station is the gateway to a city", and was adopted with the Jinhua's local culture. The façade features yankou, a type of roof design originated from traditional Chinese architecture and columns that straight out of the roof. Windows are decorated with traditional wood-carved grilles.

The north station building was opened on December 10, 2014, with the size of 5,850 sq meters.

The elevated waiting room connects the north and south station building with the size of 11,658 sq meters. It has 1,178 seats in total with the maximum occupancy of 8,000 people. There are 10 boarding gates (each gate features A-side and B-side) in the waiting area with ticket barriers in the number of 36: Gate 1-5 are for ordinary trains, while gate 6-10 are for high-speed trains.

There are two tunnels that also connect the southern and northern side of the station other than the elevated waiting area: an exit underground, plus an additional one outside the paid area. The size of the underground spaces in total in front of the station buildings are 74,100 sq meters, that includes 64,500 square meters in the southern side and 9,600 sq meters in the northern side.

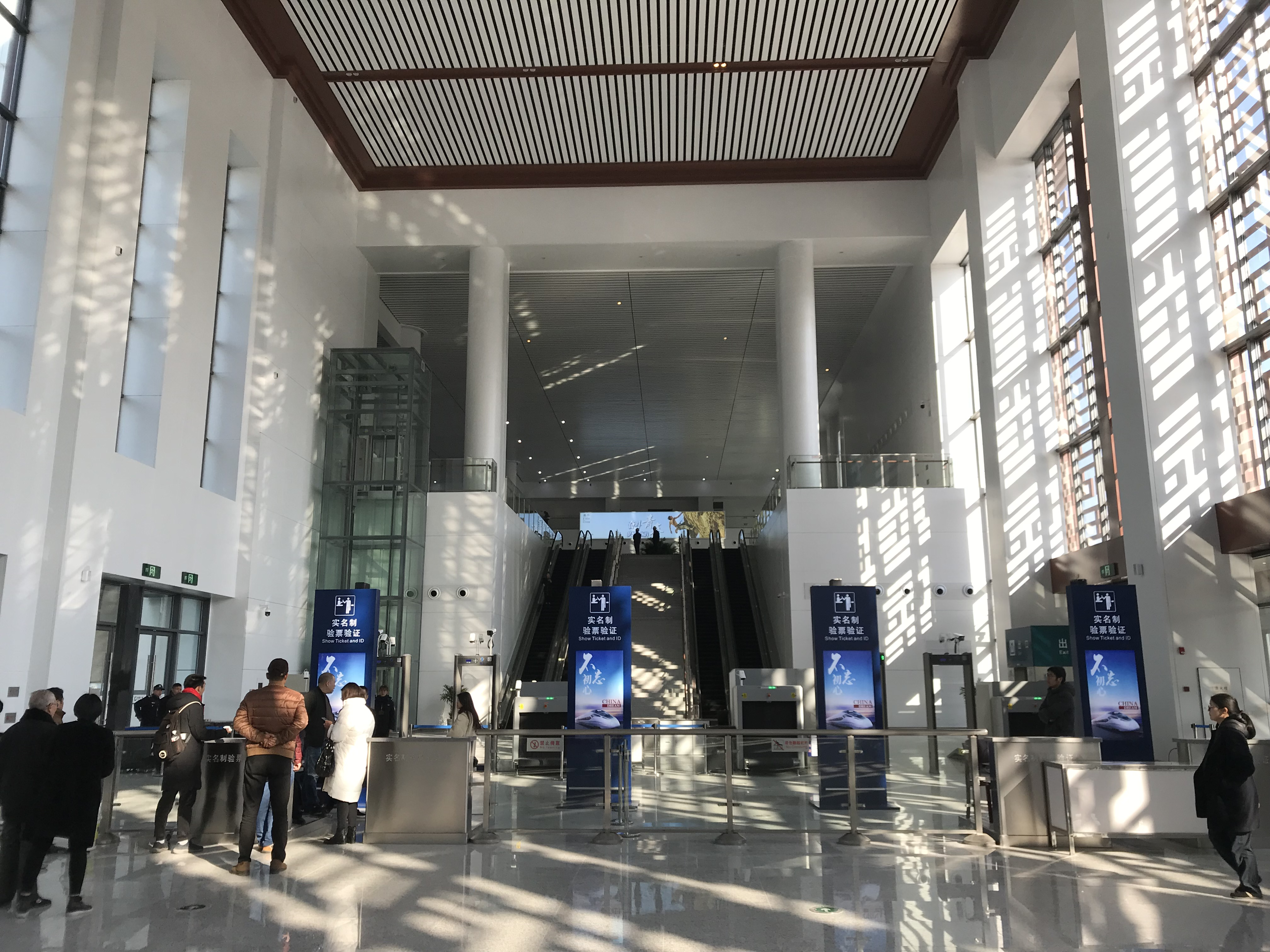
South entrance lobby

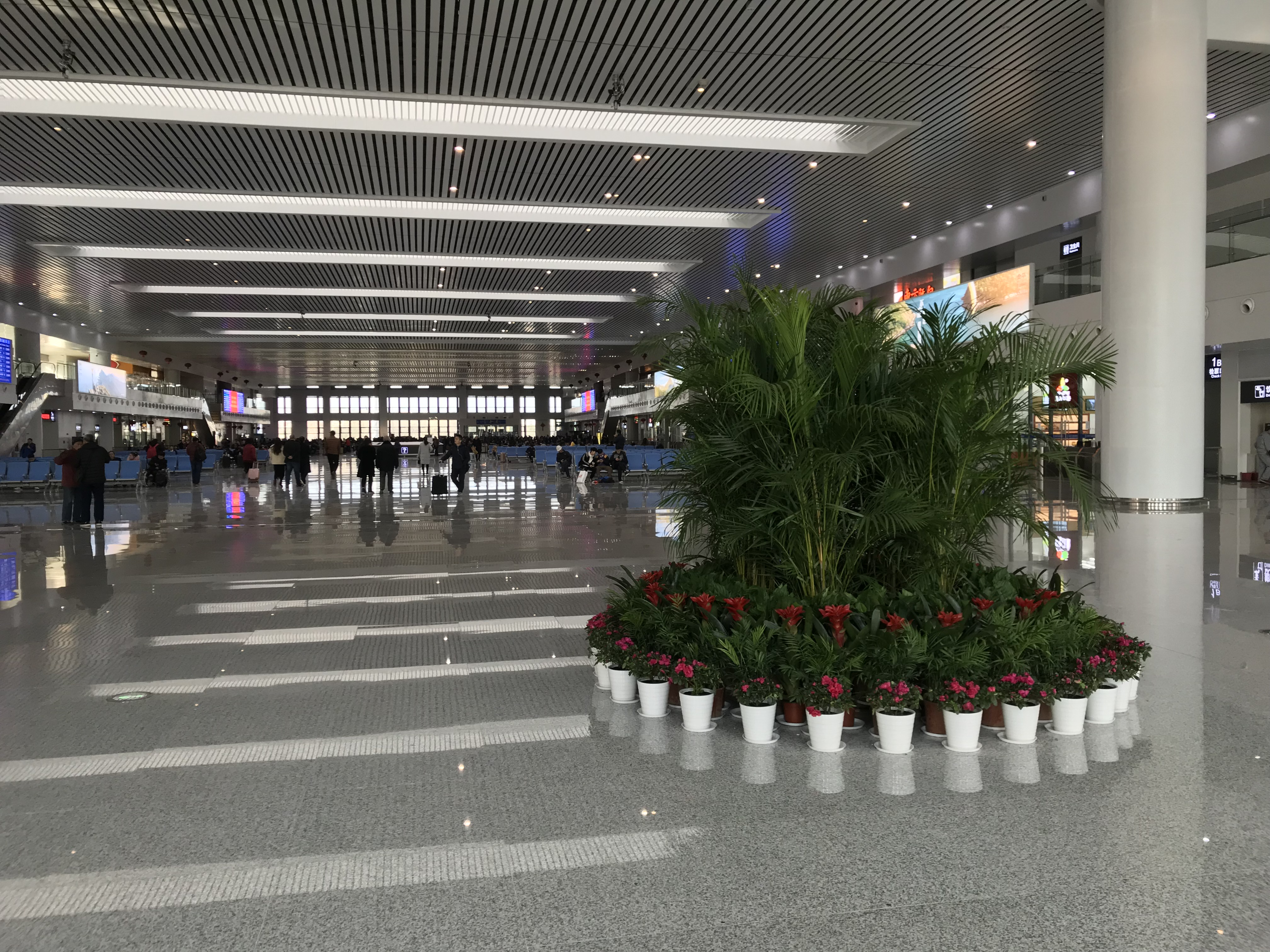
Elevated waiting area

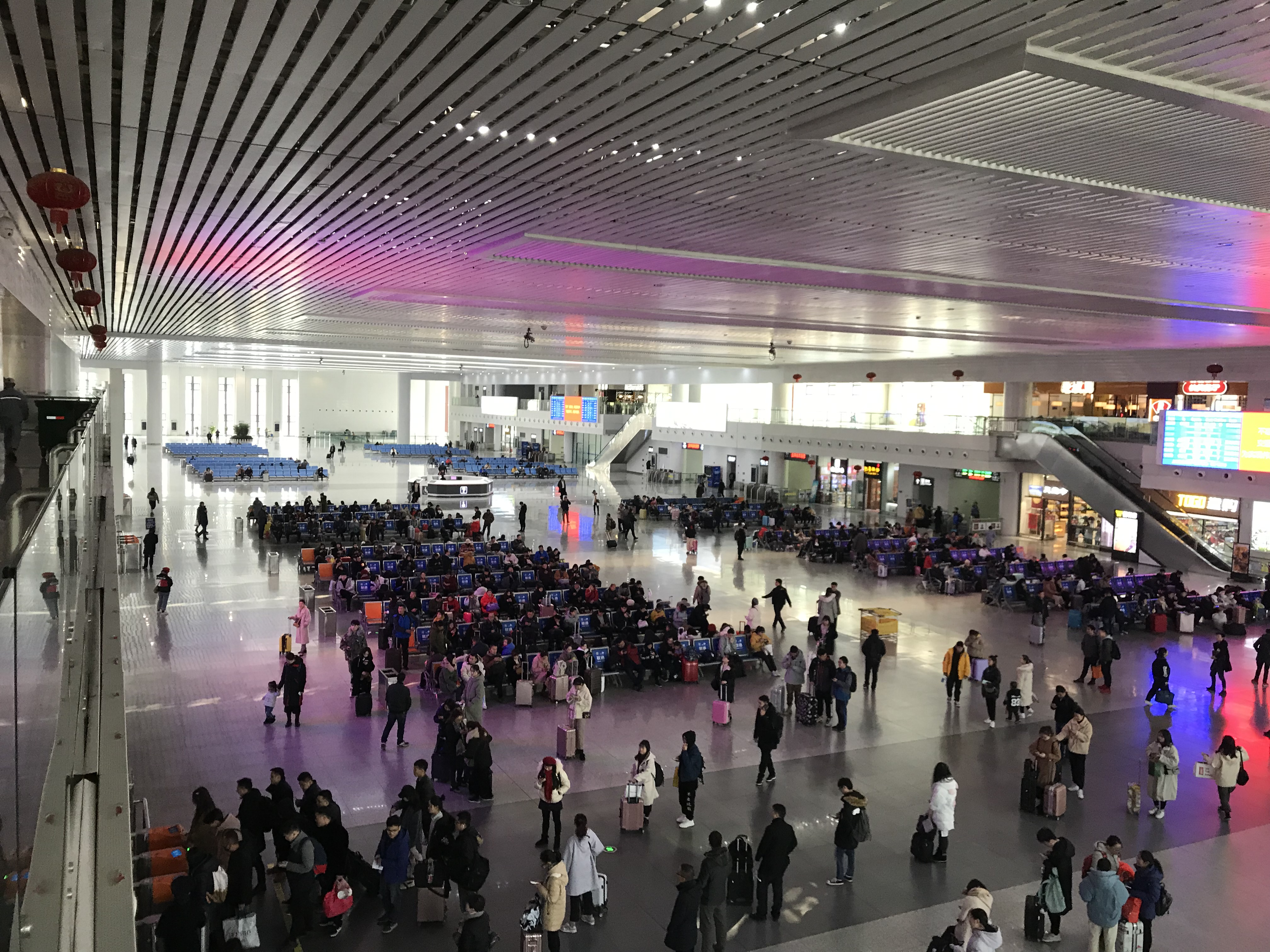
Overview of the waiting area

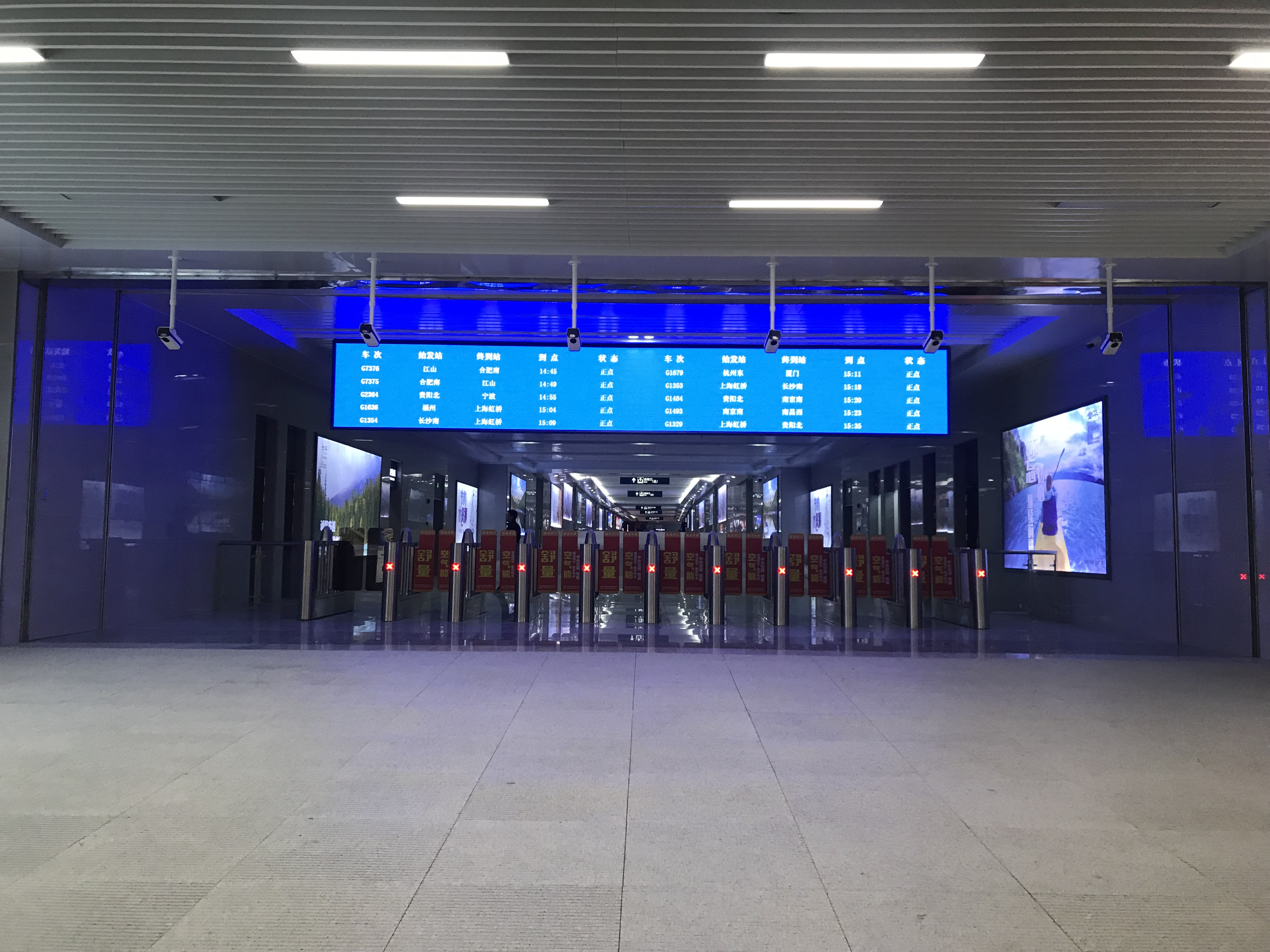
Southern exit

=== Platforms ===
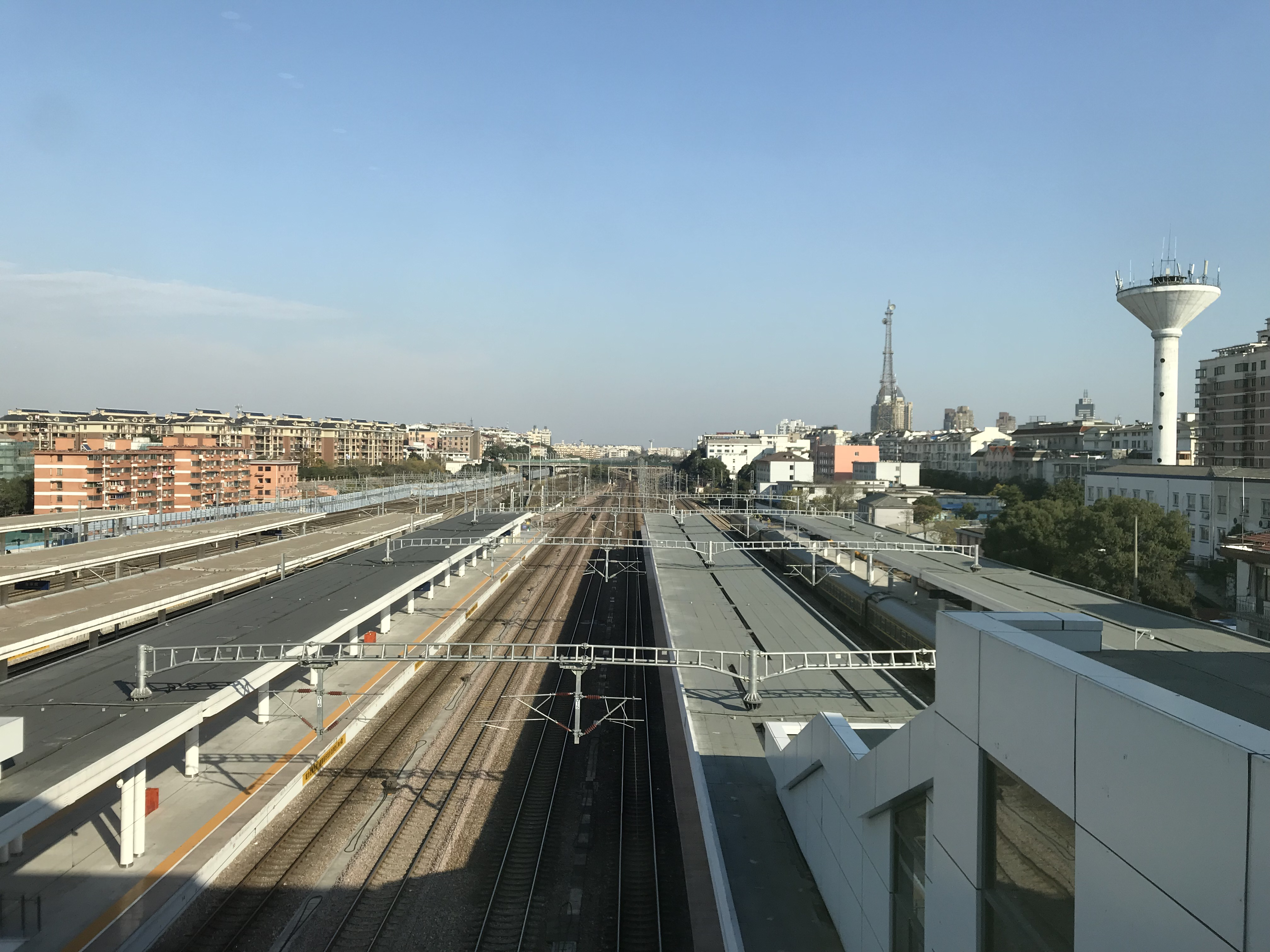
Ordinary train yard

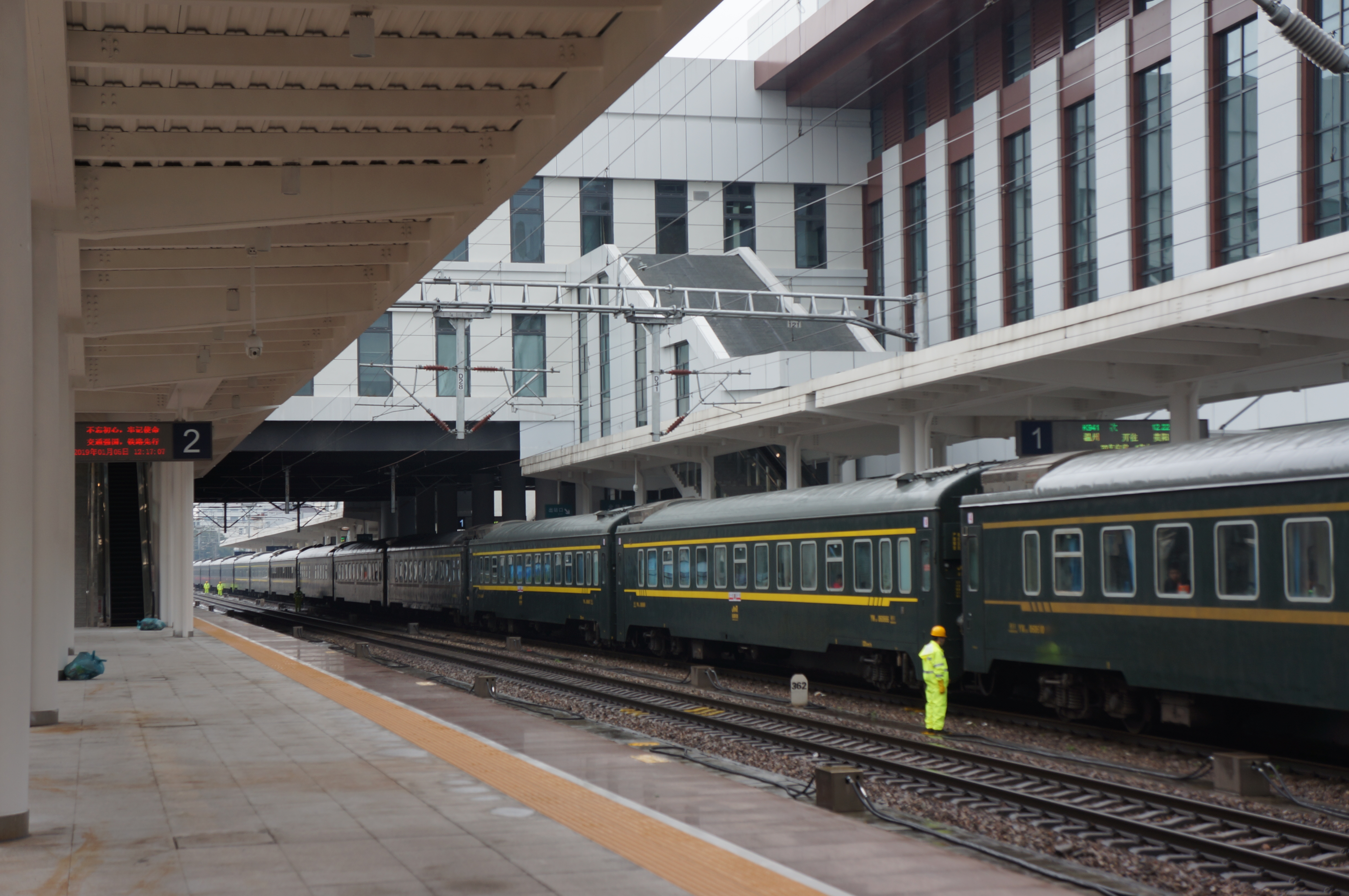
Platform 1, 2 of the ordinary train yard

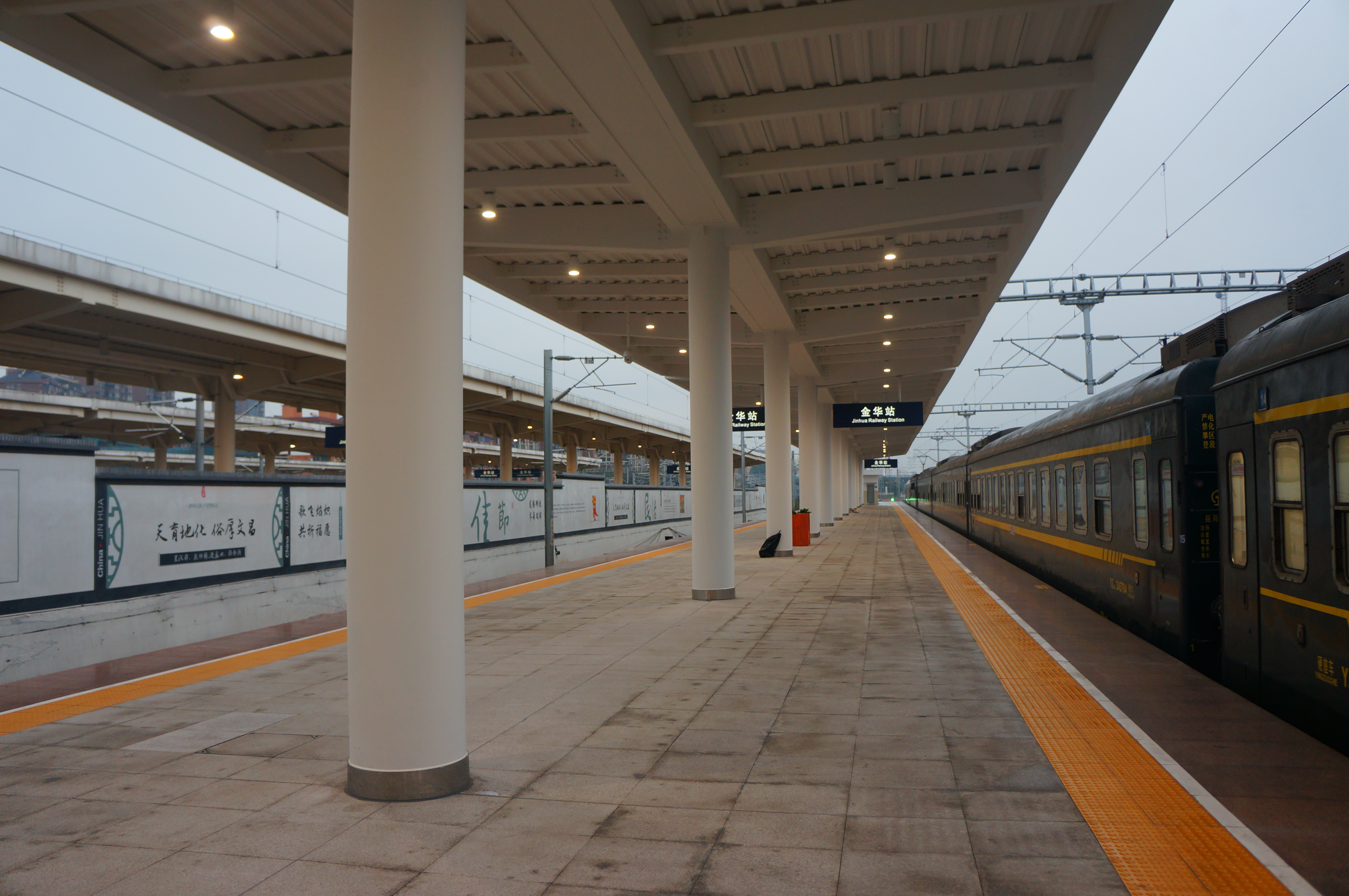
Platform 4, 5 of the ordinary train yard

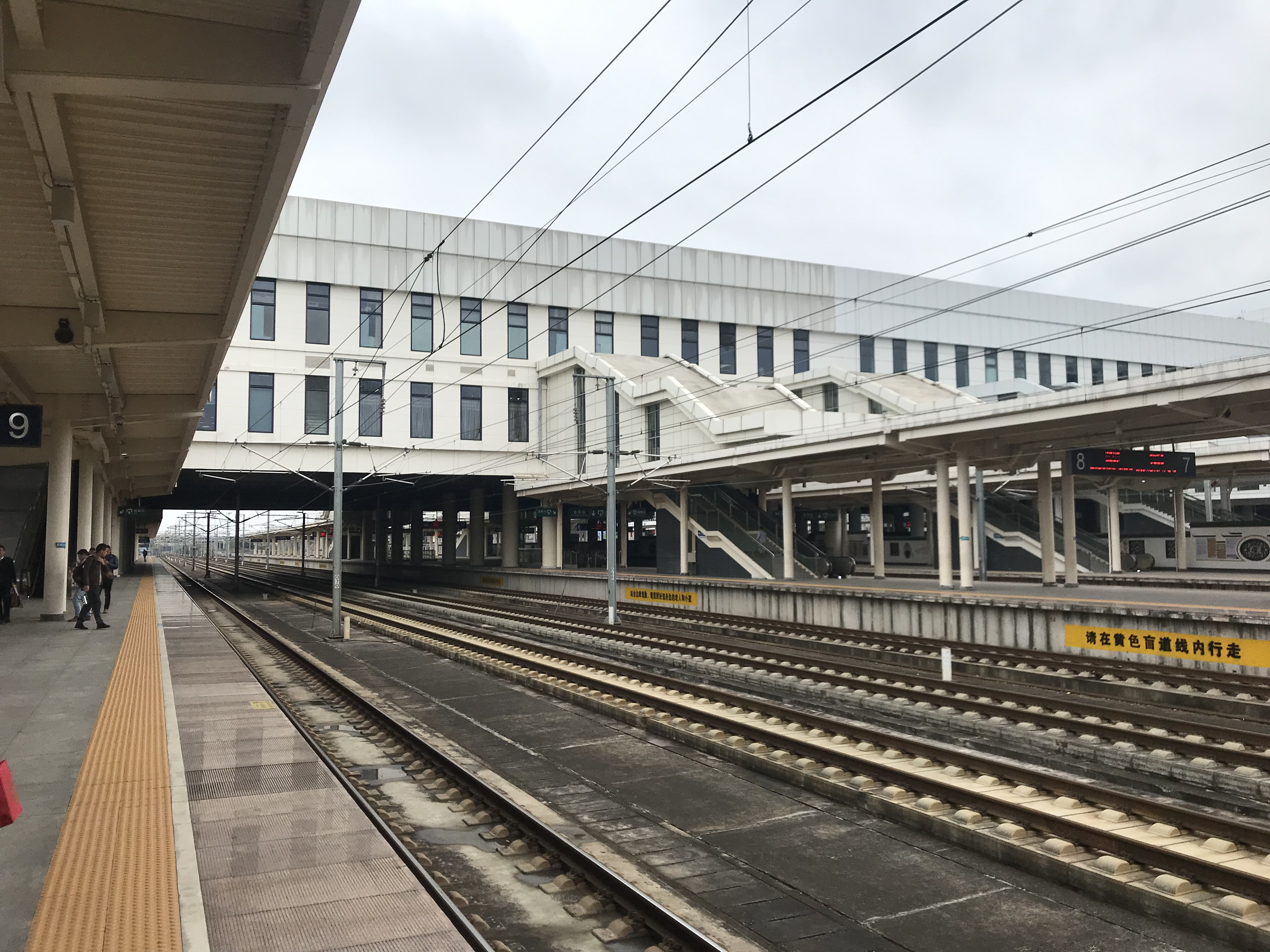
High-speed yard

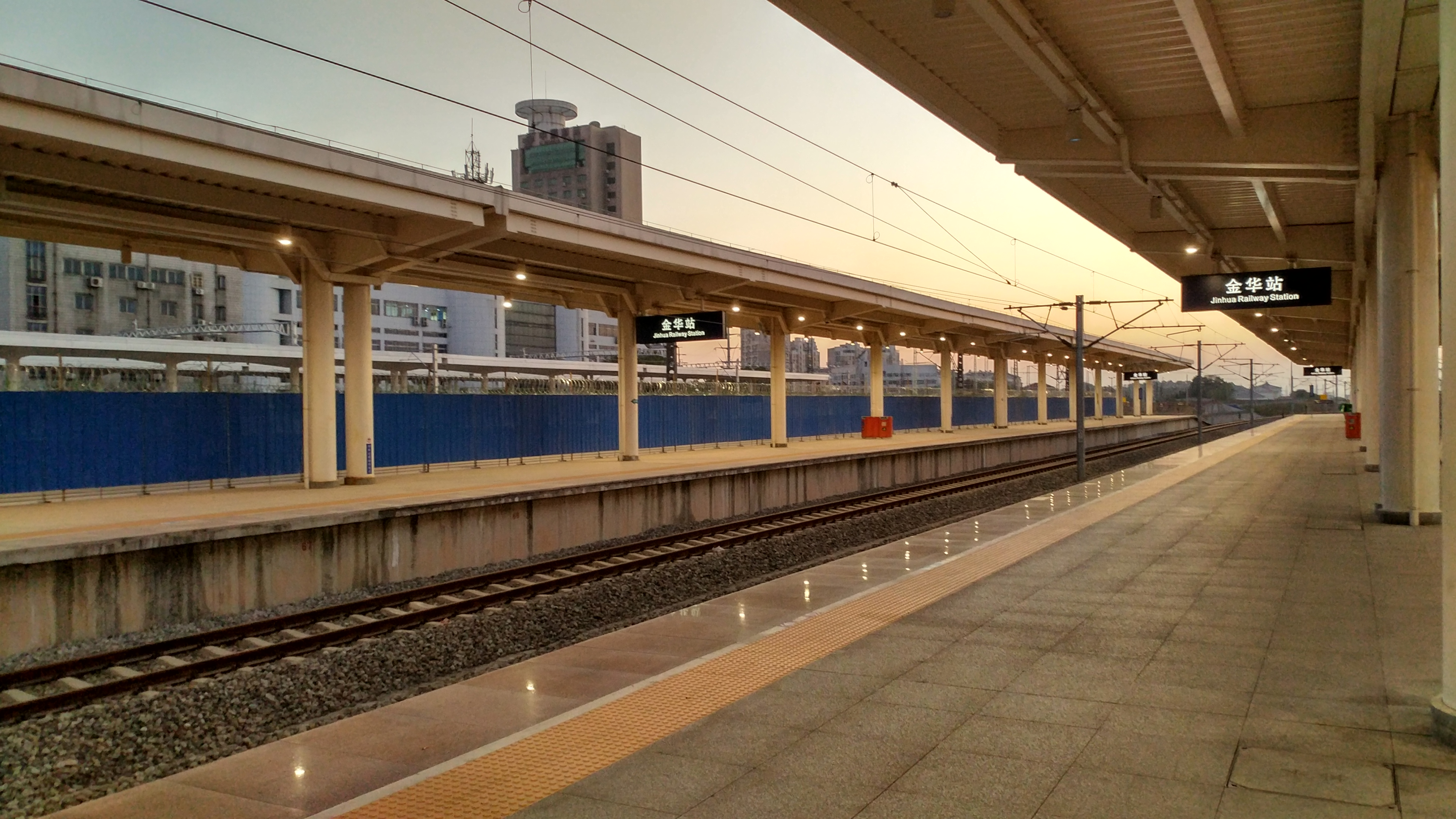
Platform 6, 7 of the high-speed yard

Jinhua railway station has 15 tracks and 10 platforms, divided into Ordinary train yard and High-speed train yard. Trains on Shanghai–Kunming Railway and Jinhua-Qiandaohu railway uses the ordinary train yard. The yard has 8 tracks, which includes 3 mainlines and 5 tracks for passenger services. There are 3 tracks to the inbound-adjacent Jinhua East railway station, and additional tracks connect the Jinhua Locomotive Turnaround Depot and Coach Depot; There are two tracks to outbound-adjacent Bailongqiao railway station, 1 for either Zhumaguan and Old Jinhua railway station. Two single tracks diverse to two opposite directions from the mainlines of Shanghai–Kunming Railway at the outbound-throat of the ordinary train yard, which means trains from Jinhua East to Zhumaguan or trains from old Jinhua station to Jinhua East have to cross either throat (outbound or inbound) of the ordinary train yard.

The ordinary train yard has 5 platforms for passenger services: outbound trains usually stop at Platform 1 and 2, Inbound trains stop at Platform 4,5, Platform 3 stops both inbound and outbound trains, trains that depart from Jinhua usually use platform 2 or 5.

Trains on the Shanghai–Kunming high-speed railway will use the high-speed yard; it has 7 tracks which includes 2 mainlines and 5 tracks. There are 5 passenger platforms at the high-speed yard: outbound trains usually use Platform 7-8, sometimes use platform 6, while inbound trains use Platform 9-10. There are no crossover switches at throats of either direction which disabled the condition for having high-speed trains originated from Jinhua.

Side platform
| Platform 1 | Shanghai–Kunming Railway to Kunming (Bailongqiao) |
| Mainline | Shanghai–Kunming Railway outbound non-stop trains |
| Platform 2 | Shanghai–Kunming Railway to Kunming (Bailongqiao) |
Island platform
| Platform 3 | Shanghai–Kunming Railway to Kunming (Bailongqiao) |
| Mainline | Shanghai–Kunming Railway inbound non-stop trains |
| Mainline | Jinhua-Qiandaohu Railway non-stop trains & locomotives |
| Platform 4 | Shanghai–Kunming/Jinhua-Qiandaohu Railway to Shanghai (Jinhua East) |
Island platform
| Platform 5 | Shanghai–Kunming Railway to Shanghai (Jinhua East) |
Side platform
| Platform 6 | Shanghai–Kunming HSR to Kunming South (Longyou) |
| Platform 7 | Shanghai–Kunming HSR to Kunming South (Longyou) |
Island platform
| Platform 8 | Shanghai–Kunming HSR to Kunming South (Longyou) |
| Mainline | Shanghai–Kunming HSR outbound non-stop trains |
| Mainline | Shanghai–Kunming HSR inbound non-stop trains |
| Platform 9 | Shanghai–Kunming HSR to Shanghai Hongqiao (Yiwu) |
Island platform
| Platform 10 | Shanghai–Kunming HSR to Shanghai Hongqiao (Yiwu) |
