= Hangzhou–Quzhou high-speed railway =

Railway line in Zhejiang, China

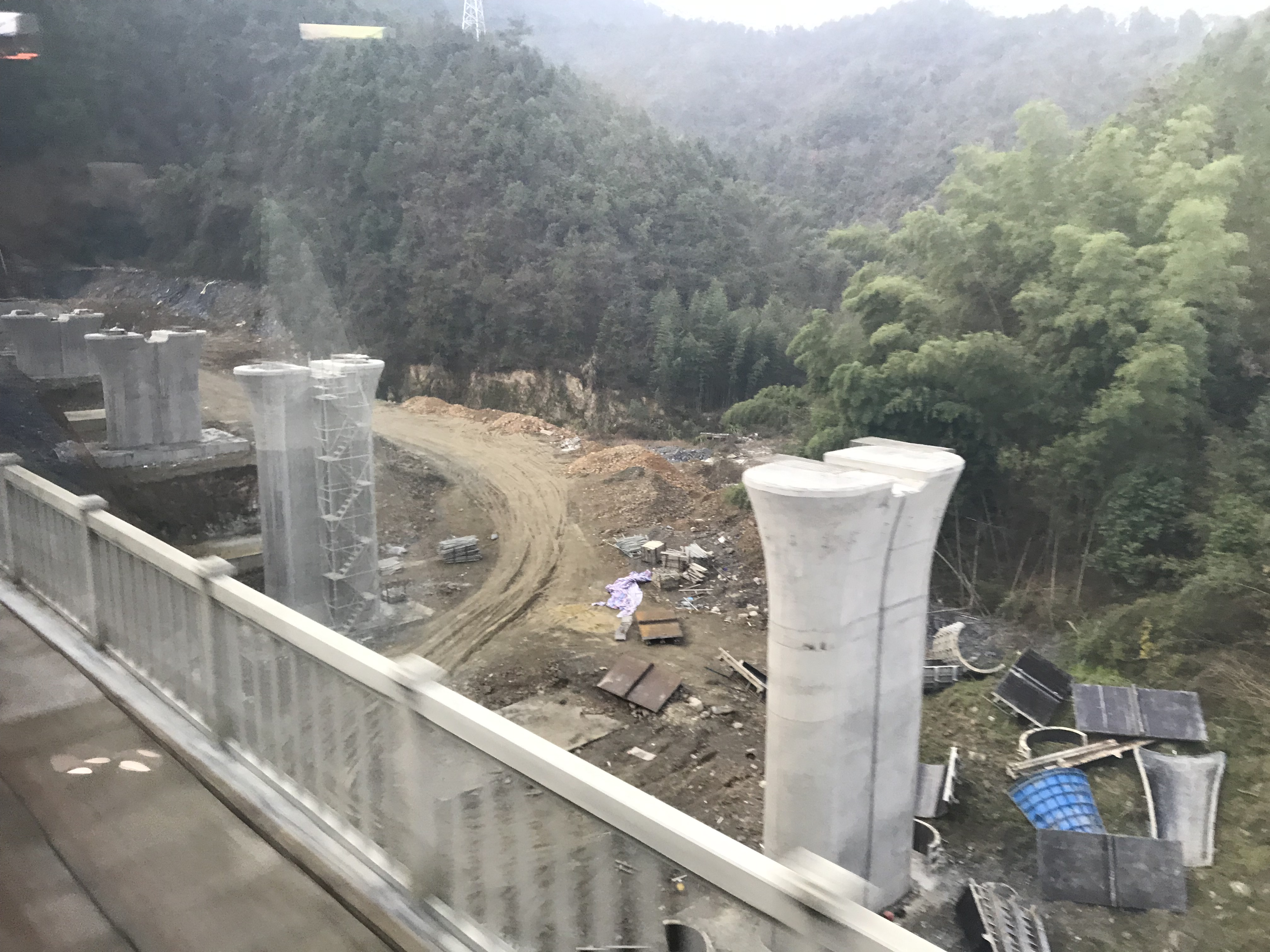
- Construction site near Jiande railway station in December 2018

Overview
- Native name: 杭衢高铁
- Status: Operational
- Locale: Hangzhou & Quzhou, Zhejiang Province, China
- Termini: Jiande; Jiangshan
- Stations: 6

Service
- Operator(s): China Railway High-speed

Technical
- Line length: 131 km (81 mi)
- Track gauge: 1,435 mm (4 ft 8 1/2 in)
- Operating speed: 350 km/h (217 mph)

The Hangzhou–Quzhou high-speed railway is a high-speed railway line in Zhejiang Province, China. It is opened on 26 December 2025.

== History ==
Construction began on 28 March 2019.

== Stations ==
(through service to Hangzhou West)

- Jiande
- Jiande South
- Longyou North
- Qujiang (reserved station)
- Quzhou West
- Jiangshan
