= Jinhua–Jiande high-speed railway =

Railway line in Zhejiang, China

Jinhua–Jiande high-speed railway or Jinjian railway (Chinese: 金建铁路; pinyin: Jīnjiàn Tiělù) is a high-speed railway line in Zhejiang, China. It is operated by China Railway Shanghai Group. It is 64.5 kilometres (40.1 mi) long and has a maximum speed of 250 kilometres per hour (160 mph). Approximately 32% of the line is in tunnels.

== History ==
Construction work officially began on 7 January 2020. It has opened in 14 February 2026

== Stations ==
- Jinhua
- Lanxi East
- Dayang
- Jiande

== Route ==
The line starts at Jinhua railway station and heads north. There are two intermediate stops: Lanxi East and Dayang railway station. The northern terminus is Jiande.
