= Longyou railway station =

Railway station in Zhejiang, China

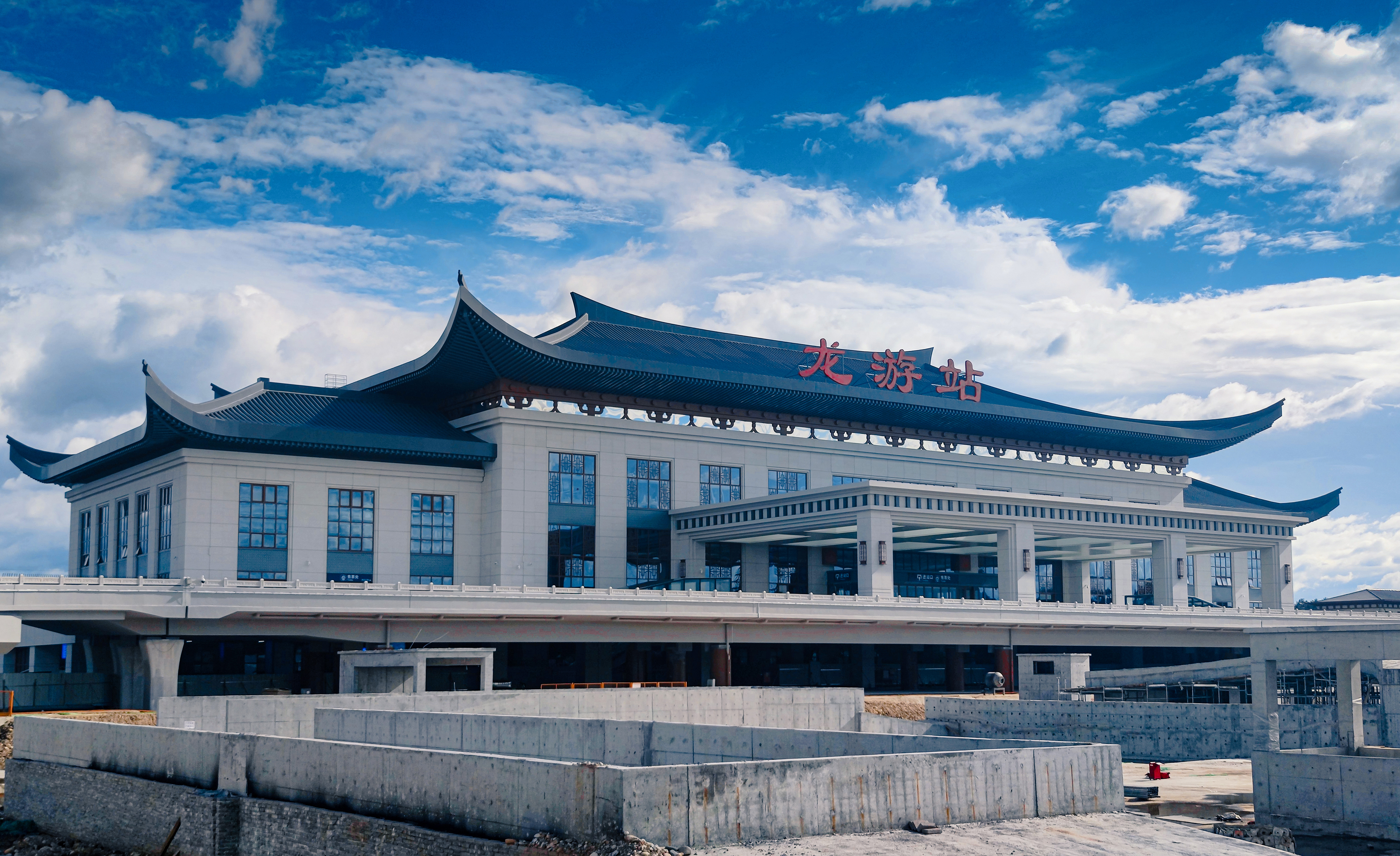
Longyou Railway Station

Longyou railway station (simplified Chinese: 龙游站, traditional Chinese: 龍遊站, pinyin: Lóngyóu Zhàn) is a railway station of Shanghai-Kunming high-speed railway located in Longyou County, Quzhou, Zhejiang, People's Republic of China.

Preceding station	China Railway	Following station
Jinhua towards Shanghai or Shanghai South	Shanghai–Kunming railway	Quzhou towards Kunming
Preceding station	China Railway High-speed	Following station
Jinhua towards Shanghai Hongqiao	Shanghai–Kunming high-speed railway	Quzhou towards Kunming South
