= Songxi County =

Songxi County 松溪县 Sungki
- County
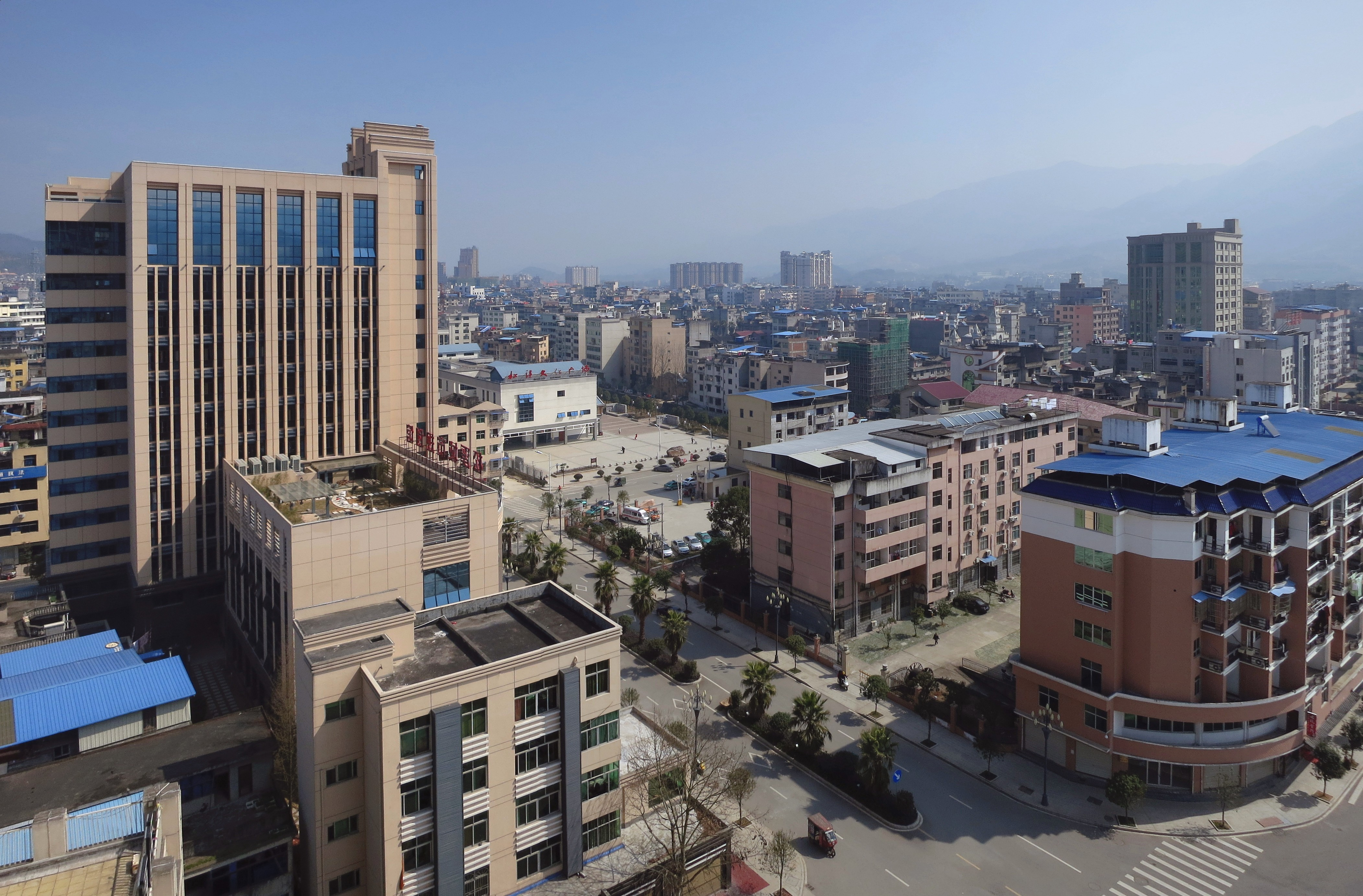

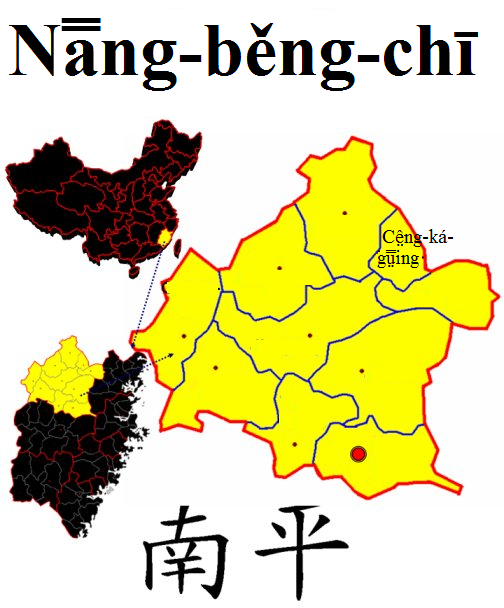
- Location of Songxi County within Nanping City

- Location of the seat in Fujian
- Coordinates: 27°31′34″N 118°47′06″E
- Country: People's Republic of China
- Province: Fujian
- Prefecture-level city: Nanping
- County seat: Songyuan

Government
  - CPC County Committee Secretary: Huang Meiping

Area
  - County: 1,043 km^{2} (403 sq mi)

Population (2020)
  - County: 130,867
  - Density: 125.5/km^{2} (325.0/sq mi)
  - Urban: 64,444
  - Rural: 66,423
- Time zone: UTC+8 (China Standard)
- Website: www.songxi.gov.cn

Chinese name
- Simplified Chinese: 松溪县
- Traditional Chinese: 松溪縣
Transcriptions
Standard Mandarin
- Hanyu Pinyin: Sōngxī Xiàn
Northern Min
- Jian'ou Romanized: Cê̤ng-ká-gṳ̿ing

Songxi County (simplified Chinese: 松溪县; traditional Chinese: 松溪縣; pinyin: Sōngxī Xiàn) is a county under the administration of the prefecture-level city of Nanping, in the northwest of Fujian province, People's Republic of China, bordering Zhejiang province to the east. Its county seat is located at Songyuan Subdistrict.

== Administration ==
=== 1 Subdistrict ===
- Songyuan (松源街道)

=== 2 Towns ===
- Zhengdun (郑墩镇)
- Weitian (渭田镇)

=== 6 Townships ===
- Hedong (河东乡)
- Jiuxian (旧县乡)
- Xidong (溪东乡)
- Huaqiao (花桥乡)
- Zudun (祖墩乡)
- Chaping (茶平乡)

== Climate ==
Climate data for Songxi, elevation 260 m (850 ft), (1991–2020 normals, extremes 1981–2010)
Month	Jan	Feb	Mar	Apr	May	Jun	Jul	Aug	Sep	Oct	Nov	Dec	Year
Record high °C (°F)	27.7 (81.9)	31.7 (89.1)	33.6 (92.5)	35.2 (95.4)	36.3 (97.3)	37.5 (99.5)	42.2 (108.0)	42.3 (108.1)	39.4 (102.9)	37.4 (99.3)	33.7 (92.7)	26.7 (80.1)	42.3 (108.1)
Mean daily maximum °C (°F)	13.4 (56.1)	15.9 (60.6)	19.0 (66.2)	24.6 (76.3)	28.3 (82.9)	30.7 (87.3)	34.5 (94.1)	34.3 (93.7)	31.1 (88.0)	26.8 (80.2)	21.3 (70.3)	15.7 (60.3)	24.6 (76.3)
Daily mean °C (°F)	7.9 (46.2)	10.1 (50.2)	13.3 (55.9)	18.5 (65.3)	22.5 (72.5)	25.4 (77.7)	28.2 (82.8)	27.8 (82.0)	25.0 (77.0)	20.2 (68.4)	15.0 (59.0)	9.5 (49.1)	18.6 (65.5)
Mean daily minimum °C (°F)	4.4 (39.9)	6.4 (43.5)	9.6 (49.3)	14.4 (57.9)	18.5 (65.3)	21.8 (71.2)	23.7 (74.7)	23.6 (74.5)	20.8 (69.4)	15.7 (60.3)	10.8 (51.4)	5.5 (41.9)	14.6 (58.3)
Record low °C (°F)	−5.8 (21.6)	−4.5 (23.9)	−3.9 (25.0)	2.4 (36.3)	8.6 (47.5)	11.7 (53.1)	18.7 (65.7)	17.3 (63.1)	12.0 (53.6)	3.0 (37.4)	−2.4 (27.7)	−7.5 (18.5)	−7.5 (18.5)
Average precipitation mm (inches)	72.3 (2.85)	100.2 (3.94)	210.7 (8.30)	203.4 (8.01)	244.7 (9.63)	342.7 (13.49)	138.6 (5.46)	123.8 (4.87)	81.1 (3.19)	47.4 (1.87)	64.7 (2.55)	55.3 (2.18)	1,684.9 (66.34)
Average precipitation days (≥ 0.1 mm)	12.5	13.2	18.2	16.9	17.6	18.7	13.2	14.7	9.9	6.6	8.8	9.3	159.6
Average snowy days	0.8	0.7	0.1	0	0	0	0	0	0	0	0	0.3	1.9
Average relative humidity (%)	78	78	80	79	79	83	76	77	75	73	77	76	78
Mean monthly sunshine hours	90.2	84.9	84.8	106.6	120.6	112.0	211.0	193.4	168.0	162.3	124.5	115.7	1,574
Percentage possible sunshine	27	27	23	28	29	27	50	48	46	46	39	36	36
Source: China Meteorological Administration

== Transportation ==
=== Expressway ===
- G25 Changchun-Shenzhen Expressway

=== Rail ===
The area is served by Songxi railway station.

== Specialty ==
- Xiaojiao (小角)

== See also ==
- List of administrative divisions of Fujian
