= Jiangshan railway station =

Railway station in Quzhou, China

Coordinates: 28.7750°N 118.6390°E

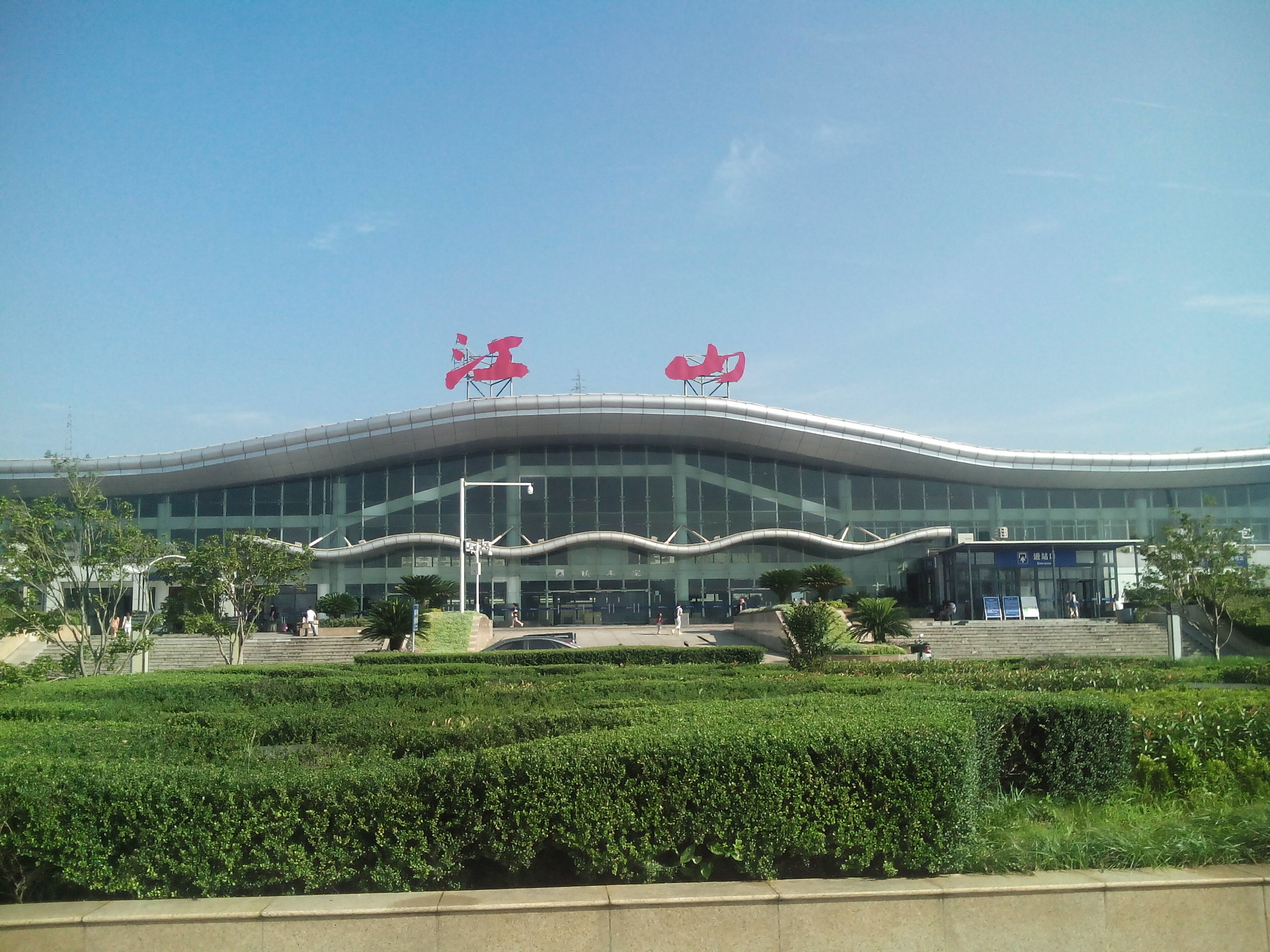
Jiangshan railway station

Jiangshan railway station is a railway station in Jiangshan, Quzhou, Zhejiang, China. It is an intermediate stop on the Hangzhou–Changsha section of the Shanghai–Kunming high-speed railway. It is also the southern terminus of the currently under construction Hangzhou–Quzhou high-speed railway.

Preceding station	China Railway	Following station
Quzhou towards Shanghai or Shanghai South	Shanghai–Kunming railway	Yushan towards Kunming
Preceding station	China Railway High-speed	Following station
Quzhou towards Shanghai Hongqiao	Shanghai–Kunming high-speed railway	Yushan South towards Kunming South
