= Jiande railway station =

Railway station in Hangzhou, Zhejiang

Jiande 建德
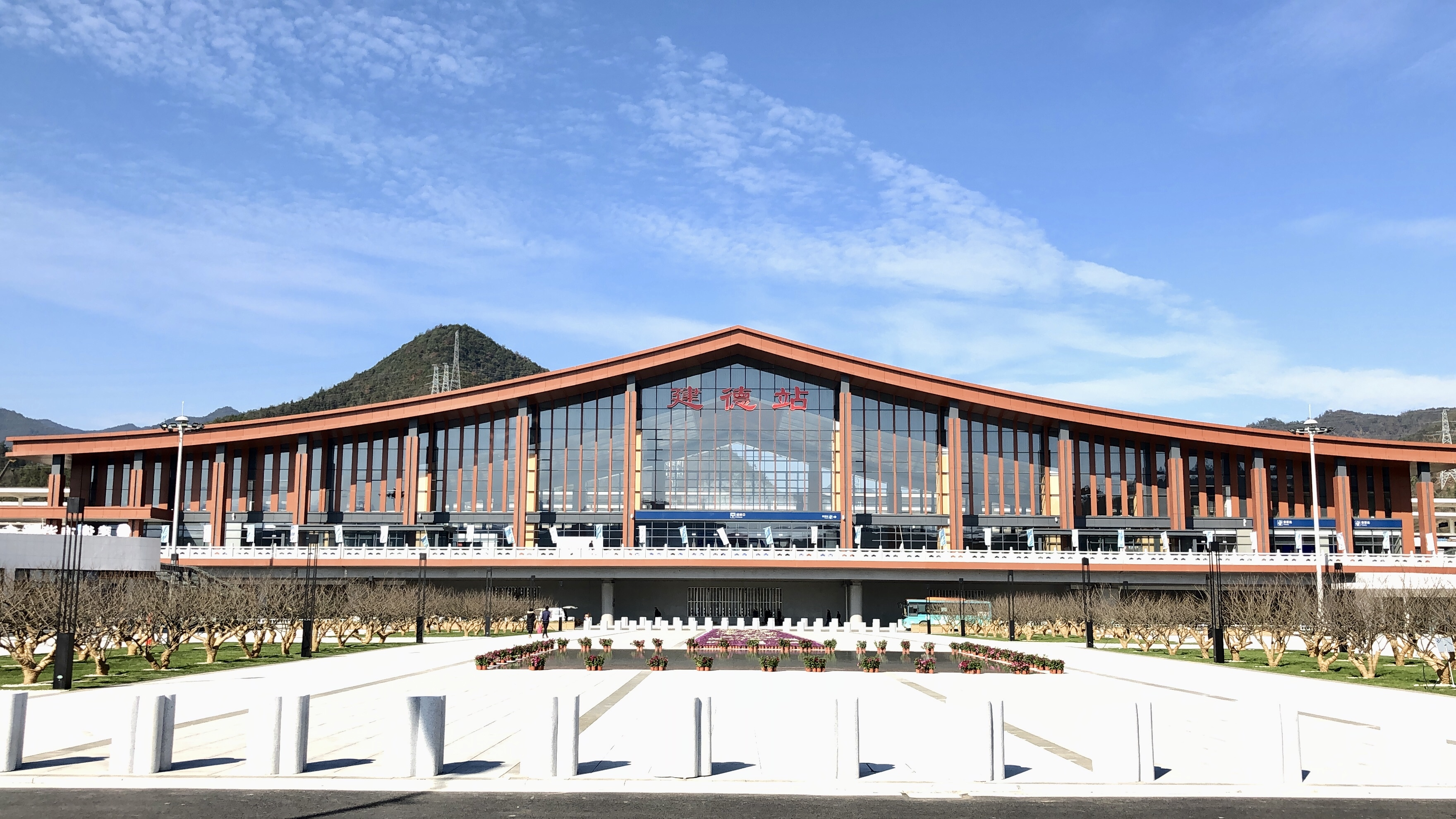
- Exterior of the station

General information
- Location: Jiande, Hangzhou, Zhejiang; China
- Coordinates: 29°34′31″N 119°25′22″E
- Lines: Hangzhou–Huangshan intercity railway; Hangzhou–Quzhou high-speed railway (under construction); Jinhua–Jiande high-speed railway (under construction)

History
- Opened: December 25, 2018
Location

Jiande railway station (Chinese: 建德站; pinyin: Jiàndé Zhàn; Wade–Giles: Chien‑te Chêan) is a railway station in Jiande, Hangzhou, Zhejiang, China. It opened on 25 December 2018 along with the Hangzhou–Huangshan intercity railway.

It is the northern terminus of the currently under construction Hangzhou–Quzhou high-speed railway and Jinhua–Jiande high-speed railway.

Preceding station	China Railway High-speed	Following station
Tonglu towards Hangzhou East	Hangzhou–Huangshan intercity railway	Qiandaohu towards Huangshan North
