= Ningde railway station =

Railway station in China

Coordinates: 26°40′22″N 119°34′46″E

Ningde 宁德
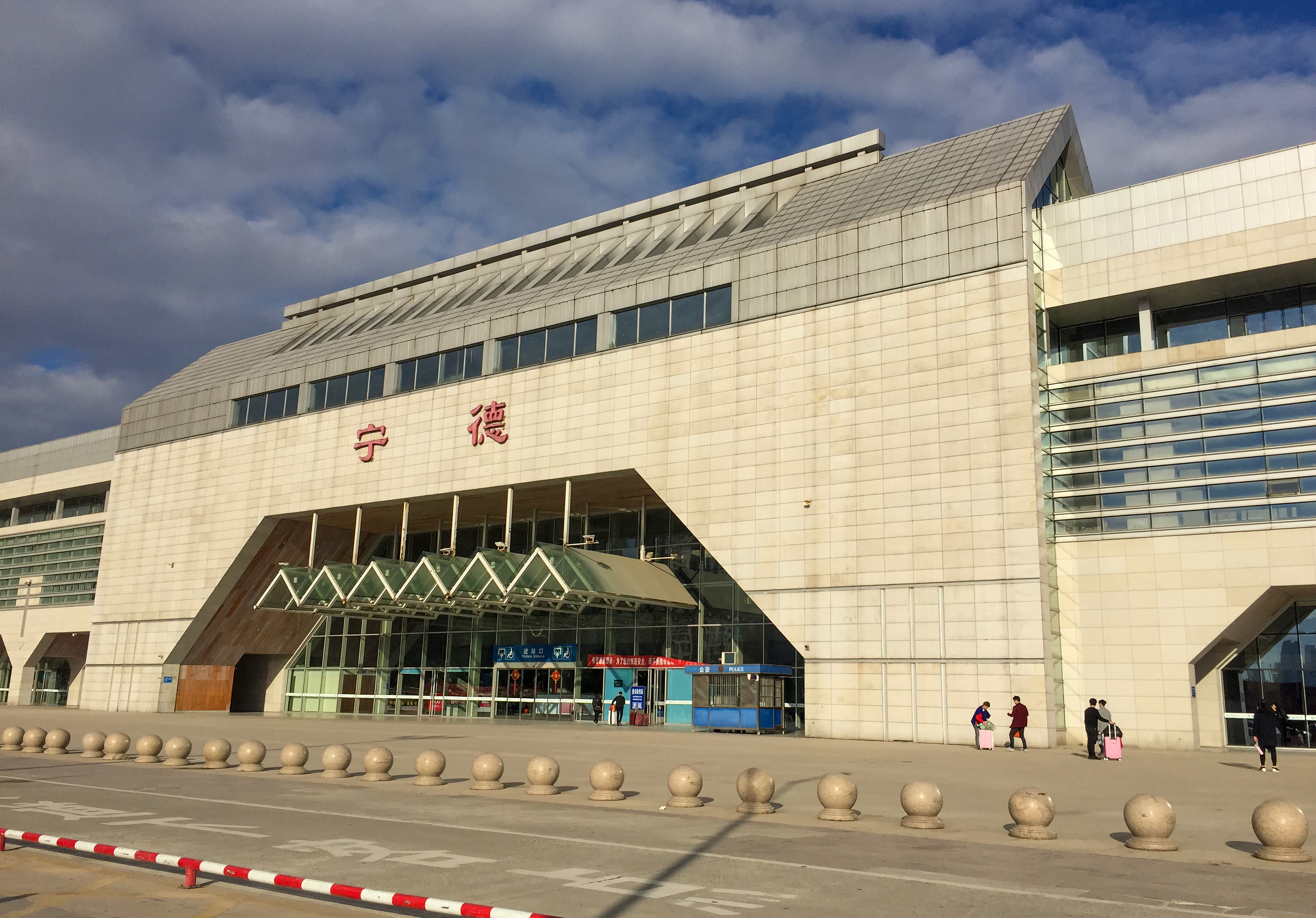
- Station entrance

General information
- Location: Jiaocheng District, Ningde, Fujian; China
- Operated by: Nanchang Railway Bureau, China Railway Corporation
- Line(s): Wenzhou–Fuzhou railway Quzhou-Ningde railway

History
- Opened: 1 October 2009

Ningde railway station (Chinese: 宁德站) is a railway station located in the Jiaocheng District of Ningde City, Fujian Province, China, on the Wenzhou–Fuzhou railway operated by the Nanchang Railway Bureau, China Railway Corporation. It opened on 1 October 2009. Ningde became a junction station with the opening of the Quzhou–Ningde railway on 27 September 2020.

Preceding station	China Railway High-speed	Following station
Fu'an towards Wenzhou South	Wenzhou–Fuzhou railway	Luoyuan towards Fuzhou South
Zhitishan towards Quzhou	Quzhou–Ningde railway	Terminus
