= Quzhou railway station =

Railway station in Zhejiang, China

Coordinates: 28.9264°N 118.8761°E

Quzhou 衢州
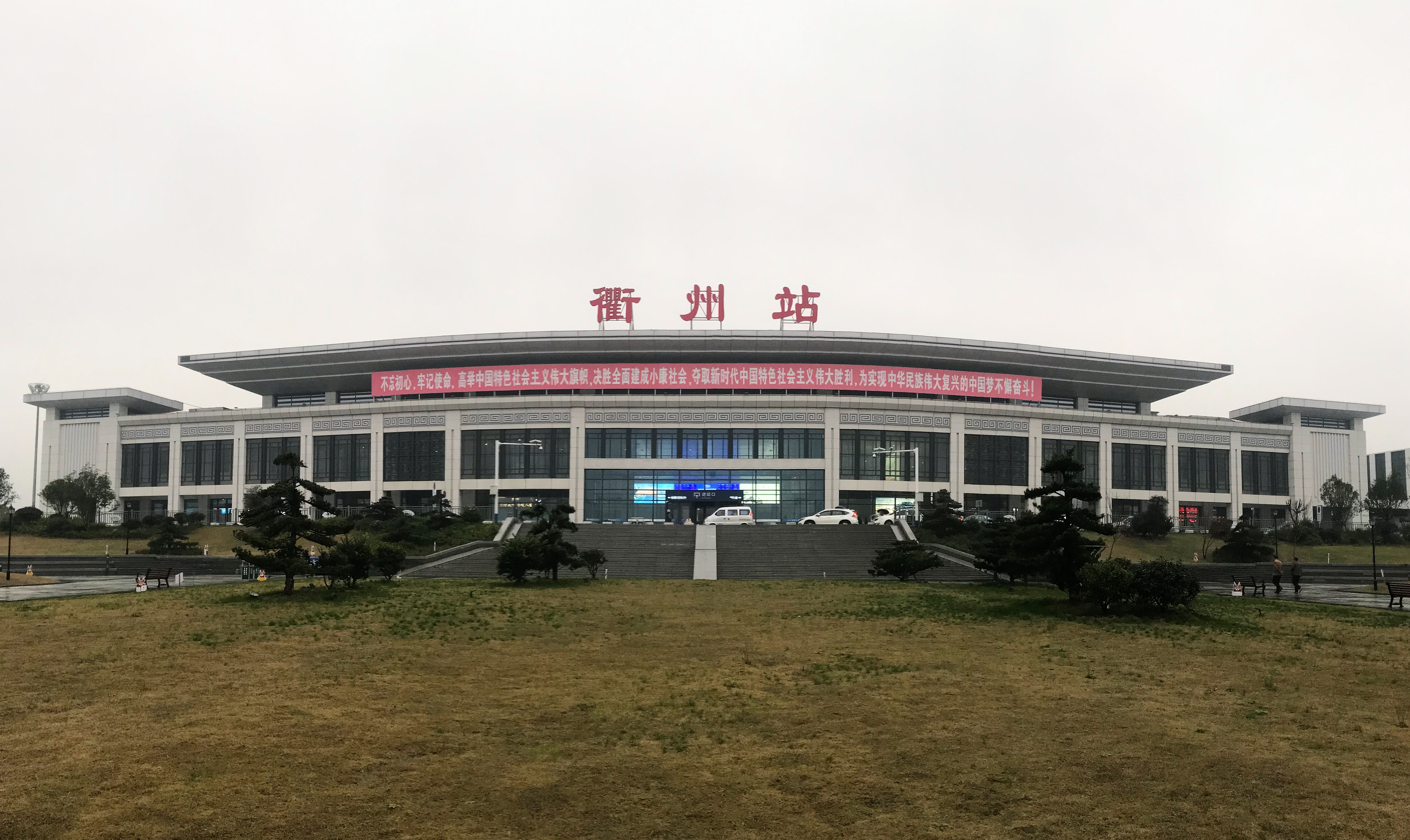
- station building

Services
Preceding station	China Railway	Following station
Longyou towards Shanghai or Shanghai South	Shanghai–Kunming railway	Jiangshan towards Kunming
Preceding station	China Railway High-speed	Following station
Longyou towards Shanghai Hongqiao	Shanghai–Kunming high-speed railway	Jiangshan towards Kunming South
Changshan towards Jiujiang	Jiujiang–Quzhou railway	Terminus
Terminus	Quzhou–Ningde railway	Longyou South towards Ningde
Location

Quzhou railway station is a railway station of Hangchangkun Passenger Railway located in Kecheng District, Quzhou, Zhejiang, People's Republic of China.
