= Changsha–Kunming high-speed railway =

Railway line in China

Changsha–Kunming high-speed railway 长昆高速铁路
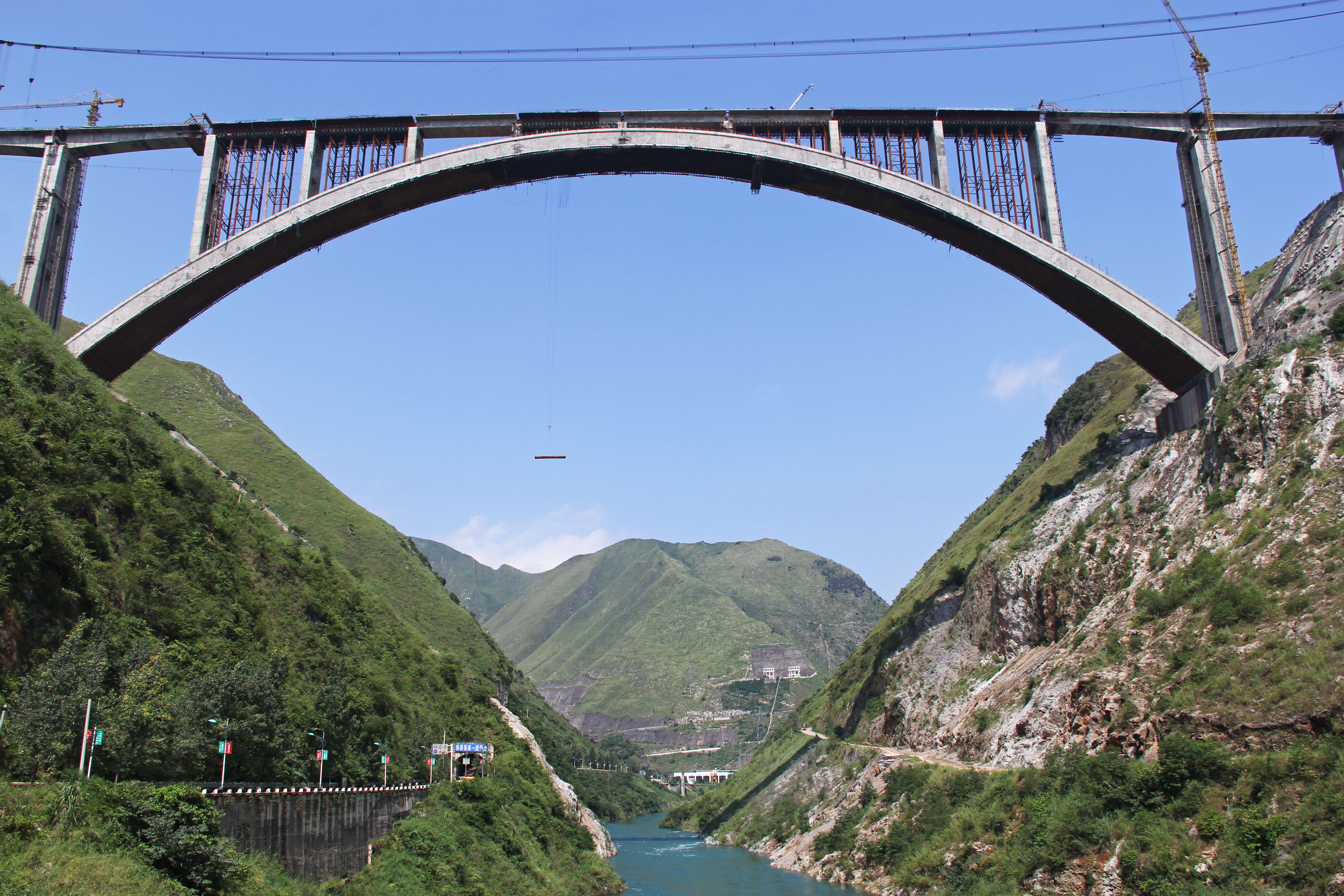

Overview
- Status: Changsha South - Kunming South; Operational
- Owner: China Railway
- Locale: Hunan, Guizhou, and Yunnan
- Termini: Changsha South; Kunming South
- Stations: 25

Service
- Type: High-speed rail
- Operator(s): China Railway High-speed

History
- Opened: Changsha South - Xinhuang West December 16, 2014; Xinhuang West - Guiyang North June 17, 2015 Guiyang North - Kunming South December 28, 2016

Technical
- Line length: 1,167 km (725 mi)
- Track gauge: 1,435 mm (4 ft 8 1/2 in)
- Operating speed: 350 km/h (220 mph)
Route map
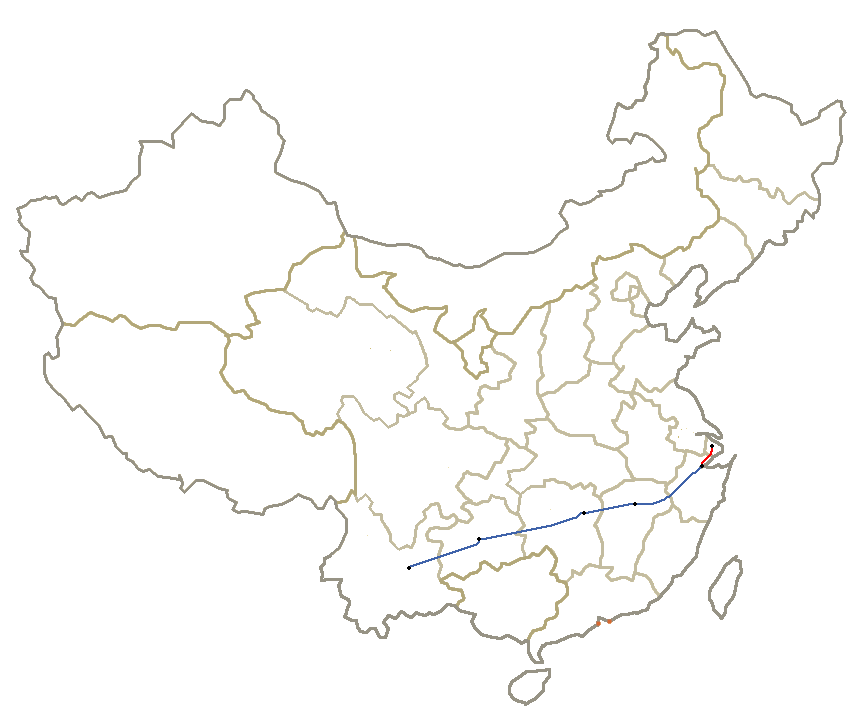

Route of the Changsha–Kunming high-speed railway

Changsha–Kunming high-speed railway (simplified Chinese: 长昆高速铁路; traditional Chinese: 長昆高速鐵路; pinyin: Cháng-Kūn Gāosù Tíelù) is a China Railway High-speed line connecting Changsha and Kunming, respectively the provincial capitals of Hunan and Yunnan. It is the western end of a larger rail project, the Shanghai–Kunming high-speed railway, which is one of the Ministry of Railways's strategic four east–west high-speed railways, and an integral part of the long-term railway network plan.

The full-length of the project is 1,167 km (725 mi), passenger line, with an operational speed of 300 km/h (190 mph) but designed to allow up to speeds of 350 km/h (220 mph). Approved by Chinese authorities on March 26, 2010, held a construction mobilization meeting, it officially started construction in September 2010. The line from Changsha South to Xinhuang West opened December 16, 2014. Xinhuang West to Guiyang North opened in June 2015. The rest of the project was expected to be to open to traffic by November 30, 2016. The full length of the line was opened to traffic on December 28, 2016.

== Stations ==
Located within Hunan is Changsha South, Xiangtan North, Shaoshan South, Loudi South, Shaoyang North, Xinhua South, Xupu South, Huaihua South, Zhijiang and Xinhuang West. 11 stations are located in Guizhou province, Tongren South, Sansui, Kaili South, Guiding North, Guiyang East, Guiyang North, Pingba South, Anshun West, Guanling, Pu'an and Panxian. Located in Yunnan province, are Fuyuan North, Qujing North, Songming and Kunming South, with four other stations proposed for the province.

== History ==
- July 2008, the Ministry of Railways redevelops and publishes a new "long-term railway network plan" featuring the Changsha–Kunming high-speed railway.
- December 6–7, 2008, the Ministry of Railways joins with municipal and county governments along the railway line, a consultative company, Shanghai Railway Bureau, Nanchang Railway Bureau, Guangzhou Railway Group, the Chengdu Railway Bureau, Kunming Railway and other units at a meeting held in Changsha. Examining the Changsha–Kunming high-speed railway Passenger Dedicated pre-feasibility study and discussing its construction.
- March 6, 2010, Construction commences.
- December 16, 2014, Changsha–Kunming high-speed railway opens the segment from Changsha South to Xinhuang West.
- June 17, 2015, Segment from Xinhuang to Guiyang opens for ticket sales with traffic to commence on June 18, commencing between Changsha South - North Guiyang with 6 pairs of trains.
- May 31, 2016, Guizhou-Yunnan section completed track laying
- July 5, 2016, Guizhou-Yunnan section commenced testing
- December 28, 2016, the western section of Guizhou and the Yunnan section of the Changsha–Kunming passenger line were opened to traffic. Thus the whole line is now complete and opened for traffic.
