= Anshun–Liupanshui intercity railway =

High speed rail line in China

Anshun–Liupanshui intercity railway 安六高铁

Overview
- Status: Operating
- Locale: Anshun; Liupanshui
- Termini: Anshun West; Liupanshui
- Stations: 7

Service
- Operator(s): China Railway High-speed

History
- Opened: 8 July 2020

Technical
- Line length: 150 km (93 mi)
- Track gauge: 1,435 mm (4 ft 8 1/2 in)
- Operating speed: 250 km/h (155 mph)

The Anshun–Liupanshui intercity railway is a high-speed railway in China.

== History ==
Construction began in 2015 and was originally expected to open in 2018. In fact, it opened on 8 July 2020.

== Route ==
The line splits from the Changsha–Kunming high-speed railway south of Anshun West railway station and heads west. It travels parallel to the existing Shanghai–Kunming railway, which it joins west of Liupanshui East to reach its terminus, Liupanshui railway station.

== Stations ==
Station Name	Chinese
Anshun West	安顺西
Huangtong North	黄桶北
Liuzhi South	六枝南
Changqing	长箐
Lengba	冷坝
Liupanshui East	六盘水东
Liupanshui	六盘水
