= Tongren South railway station =

Railway station in Guizhou, China

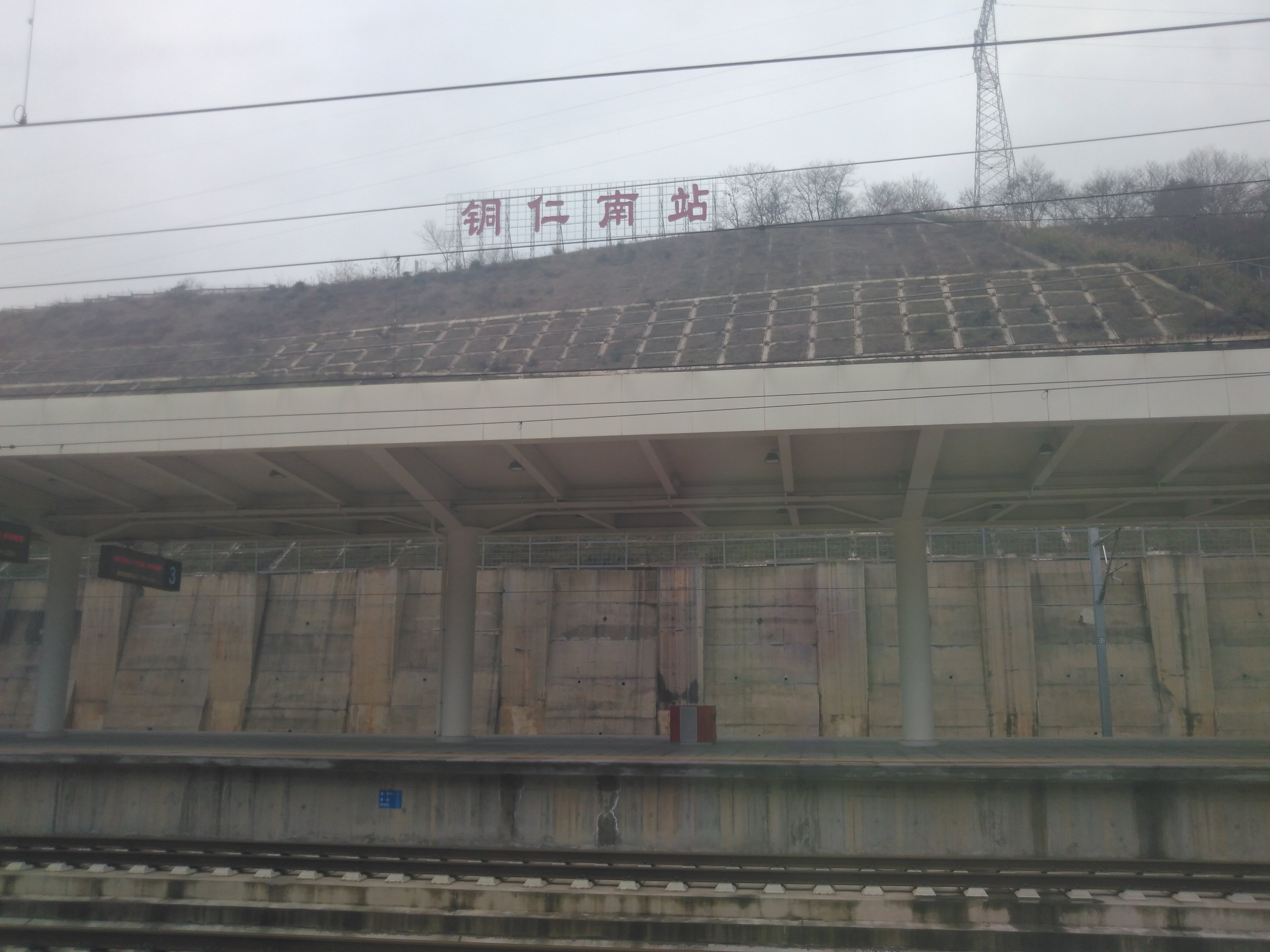
Tongren South Railway Station

Tongren South railway station (formerly Yuping East railway station) is a railway station on the Changsha–Kunming section of the Shanghai–Kunming High-Speed Railway. It is located in Yuping Dong Autonomous County, Tongren, Guizhou, People's Republic of China.

Preceding station	China Railway High-speed	Following station
Xinhuang West towards Shanghai Hongqiao	Shanghai–Kunming high-speed railway	Sansui towards Kunming South
