= Xinhuang West railway station =

Railway station in Hunan, China

Xinhuang West railway station Xinhuangxi railway station 新晃西站
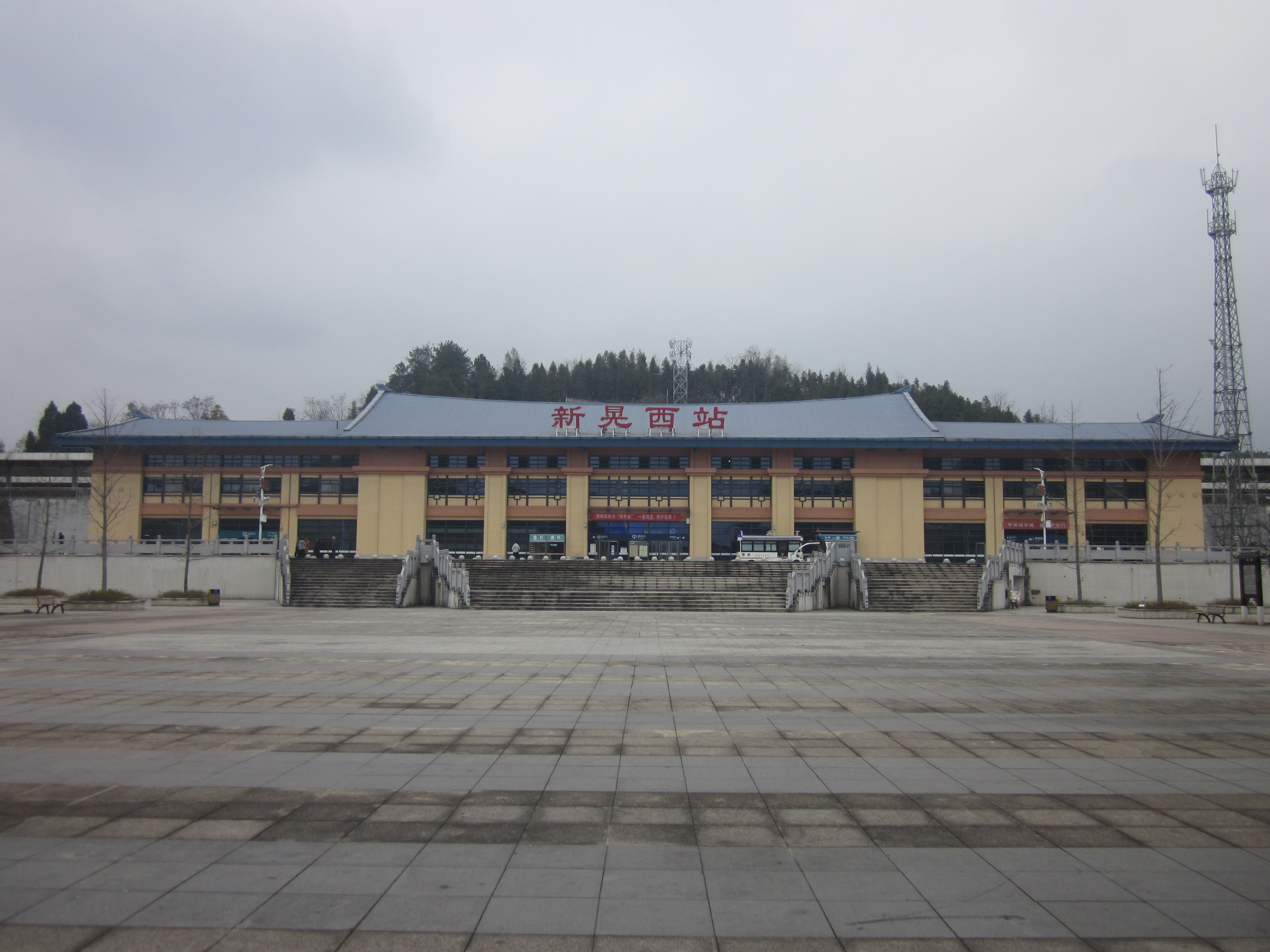
- Xinhuang West railway station.

General information
- Location: Xinhuang Dong Autonomous County, Hunan; China
- Coordinates: 27°22′45.84″N 109°07′45.12″E
- Operated by: China Railway
- Line(s): Shanghai–Kunming high-speed railway

Other information
- Station code: Telegraph code: EWQ; Pinyin code: XHX
- Classification: 3rd class station

History
- Opened: 16 December 2014

The Xinhuang West railway station or Xinhuangxi railway station (Chinese: 新晃西站; pinyin: Xīnhuǎngxī Zhàn) is a railway station of the Shanghai–Kunming high-speed railway located in Xinhuang Dong Autonomous County, Hunan, China.

Preceding station	China Railway High-speed	Following station
Zhijiang towards Shanghai Hongqiao	Shanghai–Kunming high-speed railway	Tongren South towards Kunming South
