= Fuyuan County, Yunnan =

Fuyuan County 富源县
- County
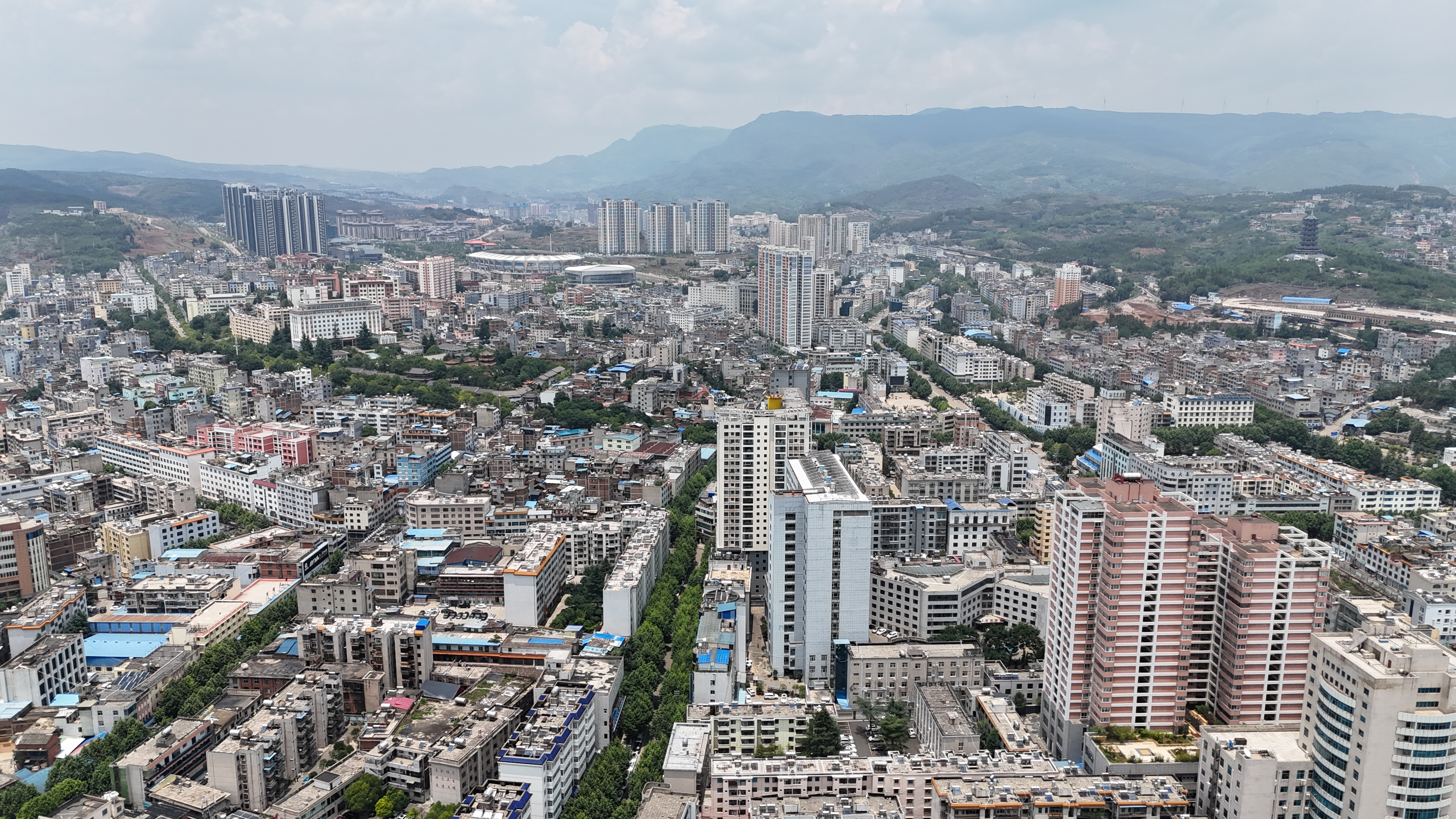
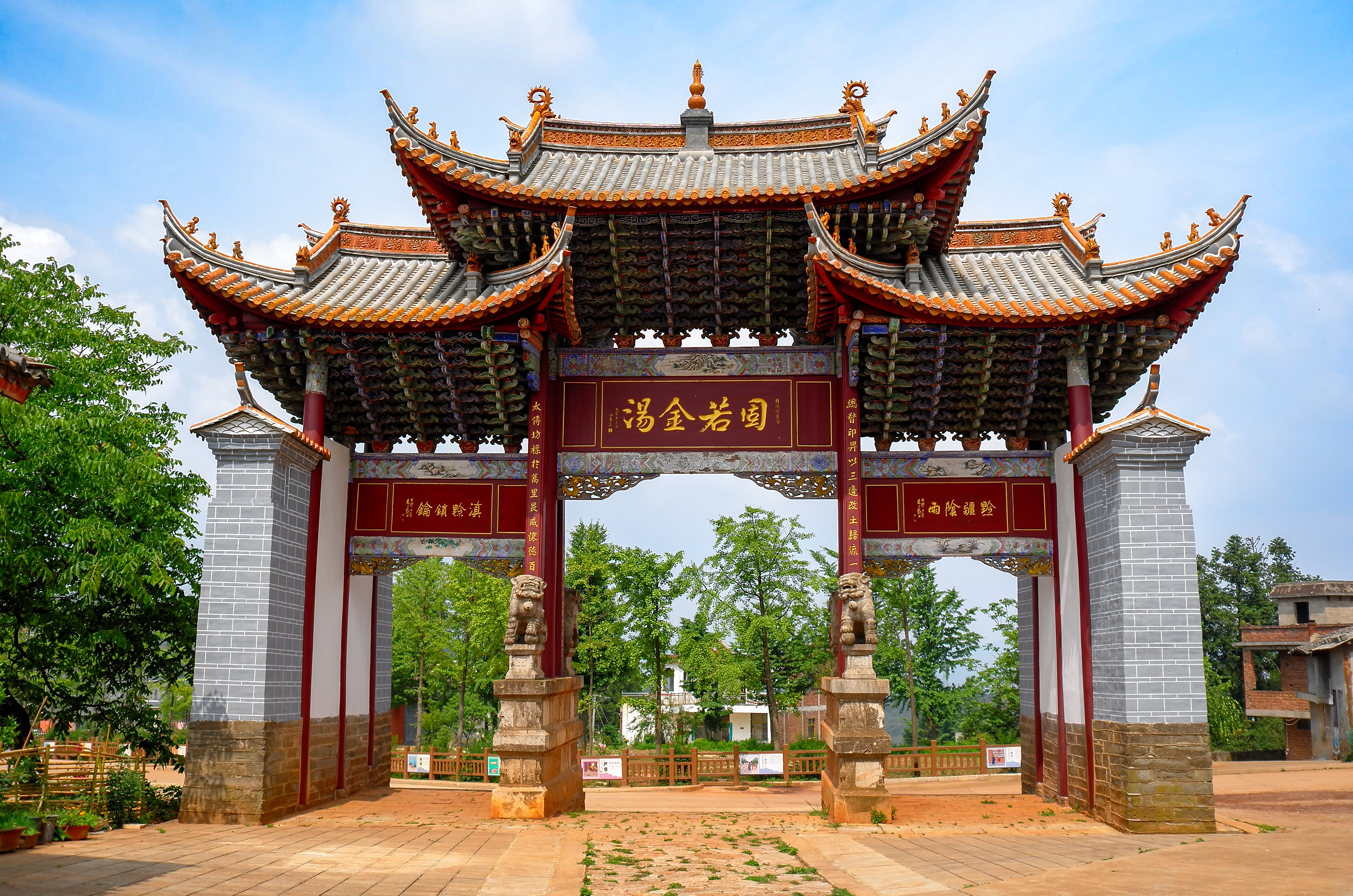
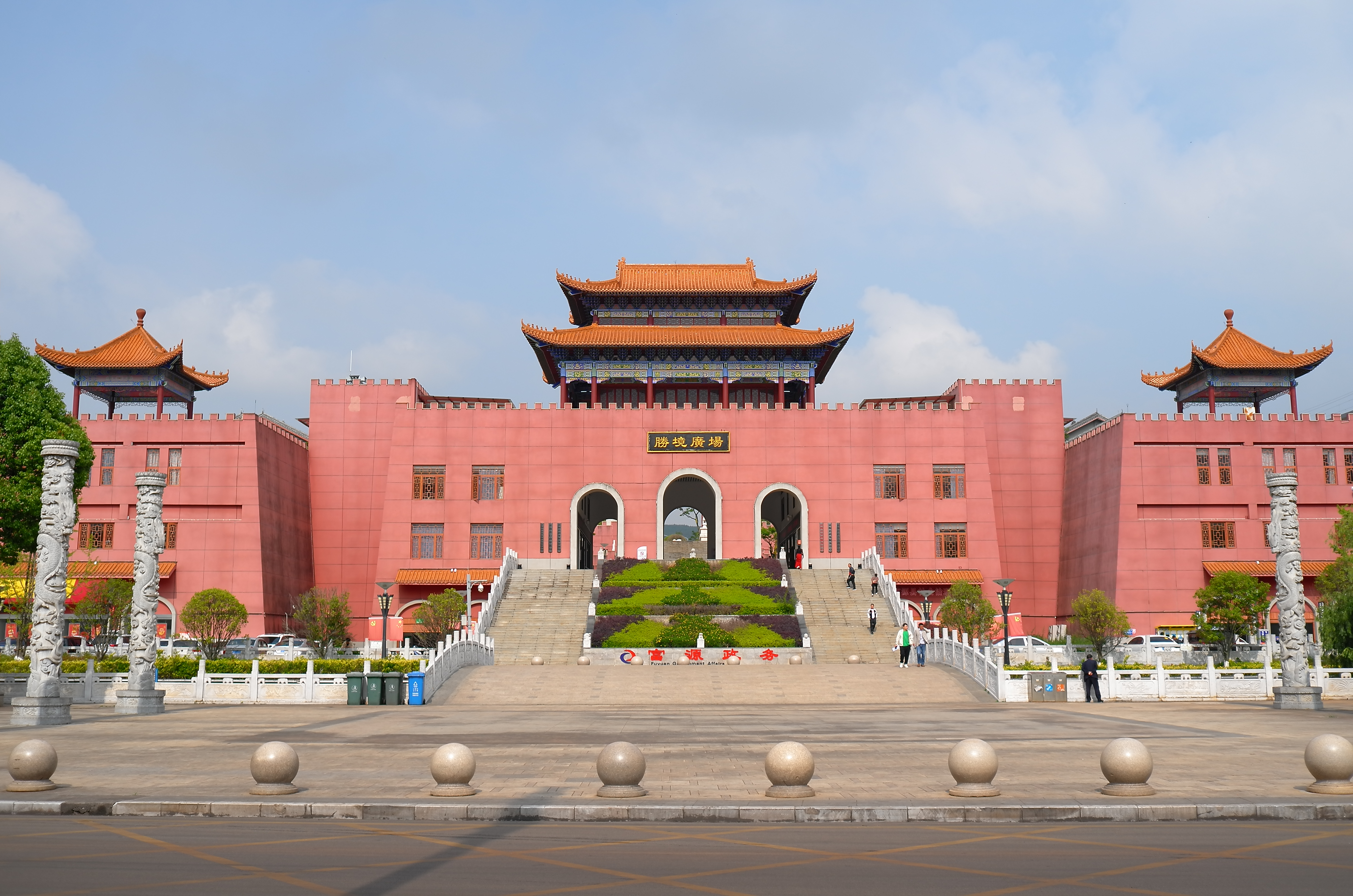
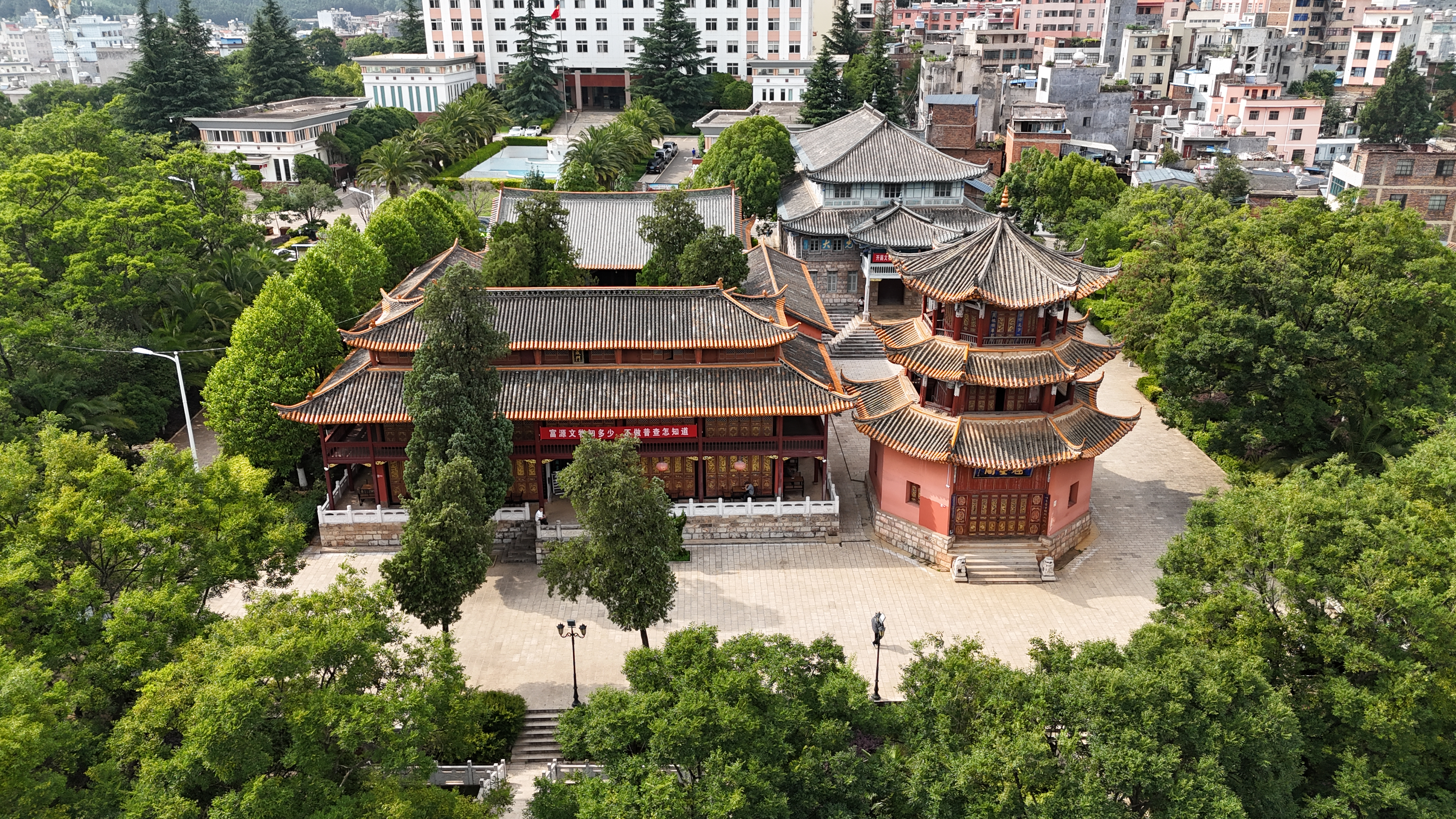
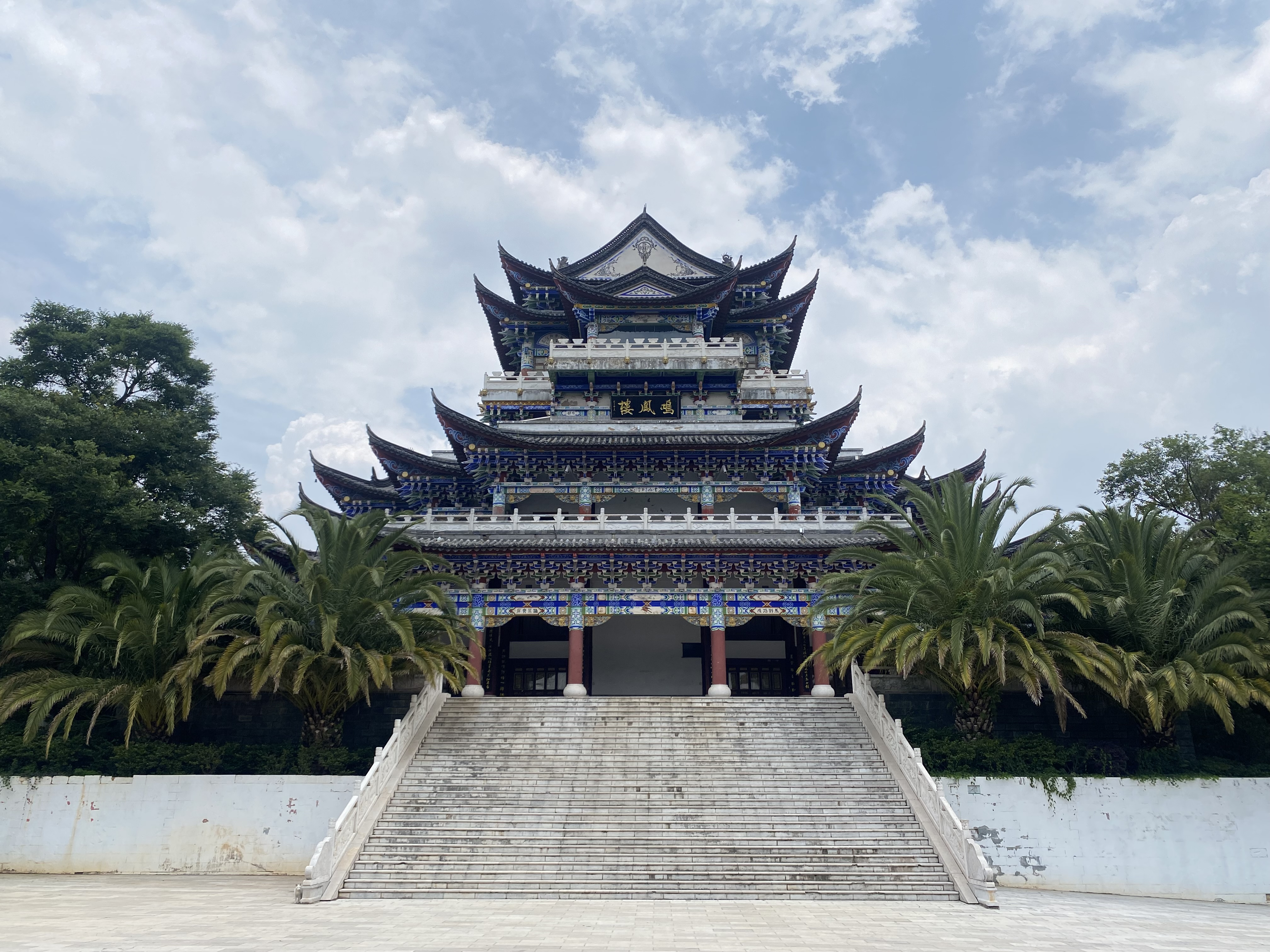
- Cityscape of county town Shengjing Fang Shengjing Square Zhongshan Hall and Confucian Temple Mingfeng Pavilion

- Location of Fuyuan County (red) and Qujing Prefecture (pink) within Yunnan province

- Location of the seat in Yunnan
- Coordinates: 25.674°N 104.255°E
- Country: People's Republic of China
- Province: Yunnan
- Prefecture-level city: Qujing

Area
  - Total: 4,093 km^{2} (1,580 sq mi)

Population
  - Total: 636,871
  - Density: 155.6/km^{2} (403.0/sq mi)
- Time zone: UTC+8 (CST)
- Postal code: 655000
- Area code: 0874
- Website: www.fy.qj.gov.cn

Fuyuan (Chinese: 富源; pinyin: Fùyuán) is under the administration of Qujing City, in the east of Yunnan province, China, bordering Guizhou province to the east.

== Geography ==
Fuyuan County is in the east of Yunnan. It borders Panzhou and Xingyi, Guizhou to the east, Luoping County to the south, Qilin District and Zhanyi District to the west and Xuanwei to the north.

== Administrative divisions ==
Fuyuan County has 2 subdistricts, 9 towns and 1 ethnic township.

2 subdistricts

- Zhong'an (中安街道)
- Shengjing (胜境街道)

9 towns

- Yingshang (营上镇)
- Huangnihe (黄泥河镇)
- Zhuyuan (竹园镇)
- Housuo (后所镇)
- Dahe (大河镇)
- Mohong (墨红镇)
- Fucun (富村镇)
- Shibalianshan (十八连山镇)
- Laochang (老厂镇)

1 ethnic township

- Gugan Shui (古敢水族乡)

== Climate ==
Climate data for Fuyuan, elevation 1,926 m (6,319 ft), (1991–2020 normals, extremes 1981–present)
Month	Jan	Feb	Mar	Apr	May	Jun	Jul	Aug	Sep	Oct	Nov	Dec	Year
Record high °C (°F)	25.6 (78.1)	27.6 (81.7)	30.4 (86.7)	31.9 (89.4)	33.0 (91.4)	32.7 (90.9)	31.5 (88.7)	30.4 (86.7)	31.9 (89.4)	28.5 (83.3)	26.8 (80.2)	26.7 (80.1)	33.0 (91.4)
Mean daily maximum °C (°F)	13.8 (56.8)	16.4 (61.5)	19.9 (67.8)	22.6 (72.7)	25.1 (77.2)	24.6 (76.3)	24.6 (76.3)	24.7 (76.5)	22.3 (72.1)	19.1 (66.4)	17.7 (63.9)	12.4 (54.3)	20.3 (68.5)
Daily mean °C (°F)	6.8 (44.2)	9.1 (48.4)	12.4 (54.3)	15.7 (60.3)	18.7 (65.7)	19.4 (66.9)	19.5 (67.1)	19.1 (66.4)	17.4 (63.3)	14.0 (57.2)	11.1 (52.0)	6.6 (43.9)	14.2 (57.5)
Mean daily minimum °C (°F)	2.5 (36.5)	4.1 (39.4)	7.2 (45.0)	10.6 (51.1)	14.0 (57.2)	16.1 (61.0)	16.5 (61.7)	15.7 (60.3)	14.5 (58.1)	11.0 (51.8)	6.9 (44.4)	3.1 (37.6)	10.2 (50.3)
Record low °C (°F)	−6.4 (20.5)	−4.6 (23.7)	−5.5 (22.1)	−0.6 (30.9)	3.1 (37.6)	8.2 (46.8)	7.9 (46.2)	8.8 (47.8)	4.3 (39.7)	1.9 (35.4)	−4.4 (24.1)	−11.0 (12.2)	−11.0 (12.2)
Average precipitation mm (inches)	21.9 (0.86)	10.6 (0.42)	25.2 (0.99)	45.6 (1.80)	87.8 (3.46)	252.5 (9.94)	180.0 (7.09)	141.8 (5.58)	138.8 (5.46)	73.3 (2.89)	22.4 (0.88)	19.1 (0.75)	1,019 (40.12)
Average precipitation days (≥ 0.1 mm)	7.5	5.7	8.9	11.3	12.0	17.8	18.3	18.4	16.0	14.6	6.8	9.1	146.4
Average snowy days	3.6	1.7	0.3	0	0	0	0	0	0	0	0	2.2	7.8
Average relative humidity (%)	74	64	63	65	69	81	83	82	85	84	78	80	76
Mean monthly sunshine hours	170.5	186.0	207.1	207.4	202.5	112.1	121.1	144.5	93.8	109.4	158.9	122.9	1,836.2
Percentage possible sunshine	51	58	55	54	49	27	29	36	26	31	49	38	42
Source: China Meteorological Administrationall-time November record

== Transportation ==
The county has one high-speed rail station, Fuyuan North, on the Shanghai–Kunming high-speed railway. There are also three stations on the conventional Panxi railway.
