= Loudi South railway station =

Railway station in Loudi, China

Loudinan 娄底南站
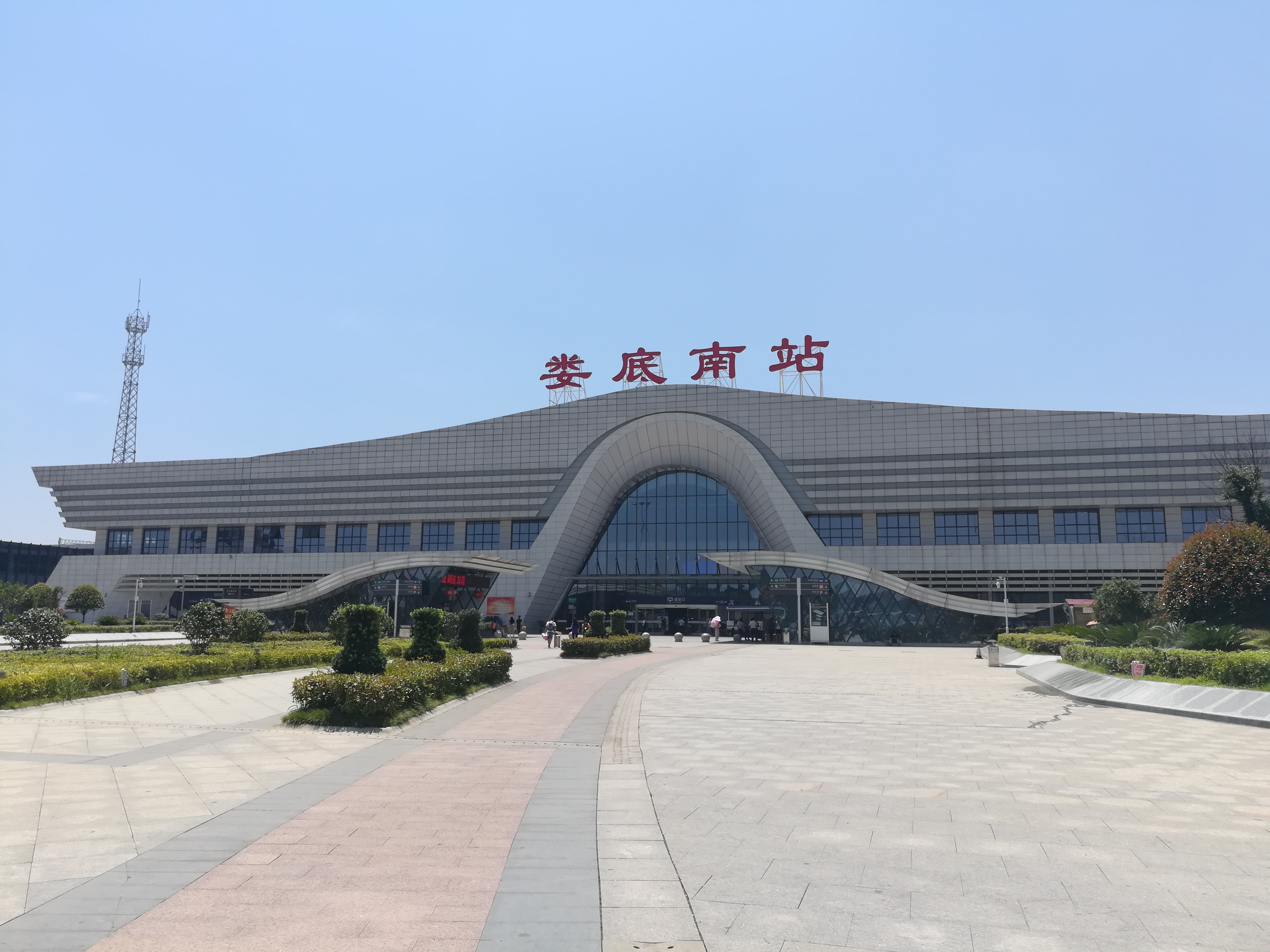
- Loudi South railway station.

General information
- Location: Loudi, Hunan; China
- Coordinates: 27°39′57.03″N 112°0′32.65″E
- Operator: China Railway
- Lines: Shanghai–Kunming high-speed railway Loudi–Shaoyang railway

Other information
- Station code: Telegraph code: UOQ; Pinyin code: LDN
- Classification: 2nd class station

History
- Opened: 16 December 2014
Location

The Loudi South railway station or Loudinan railway station (simplified Chinese: 娄底南站; traditional Chinese: 婁底南站; pinyin: Lóudǐnán Zhàn) is a railway station of the Shanghai–Kunming high-speed railway and Loudi–Shaoyang railway located in Loudi, Hunan, People's Republic of China.

Preceding station	China Railway High-speed	Following station
Shaoshan South towards Shanghai Hongqiao	Shanghai–Kunming high-speed railway	Shaoyang North towards Kunming South
