= Xupu South railway station =

Railway station in Huaihua, China

Coordinates: 27.6084°N 110.5912°E

Xupu South railway station (Chinese: 溆浦南站) is a railway station on the Changsha–Kunming section of the Shanghai–Kunming high-speed railway. It is located in Beidouxi Township, Xupu County, Huaihua, Hunan, People's Republic of China.

Preceding station	China Railway High-speed	Following station
Xinhua South towards Shanghai Hongqiao	Shanghai–Kunming high-speed railway	Huaihua South towards Kunming South
