= Xinhua South railway station =

Railway Station in Hunan, China

Xinhua South railway station 新化南站
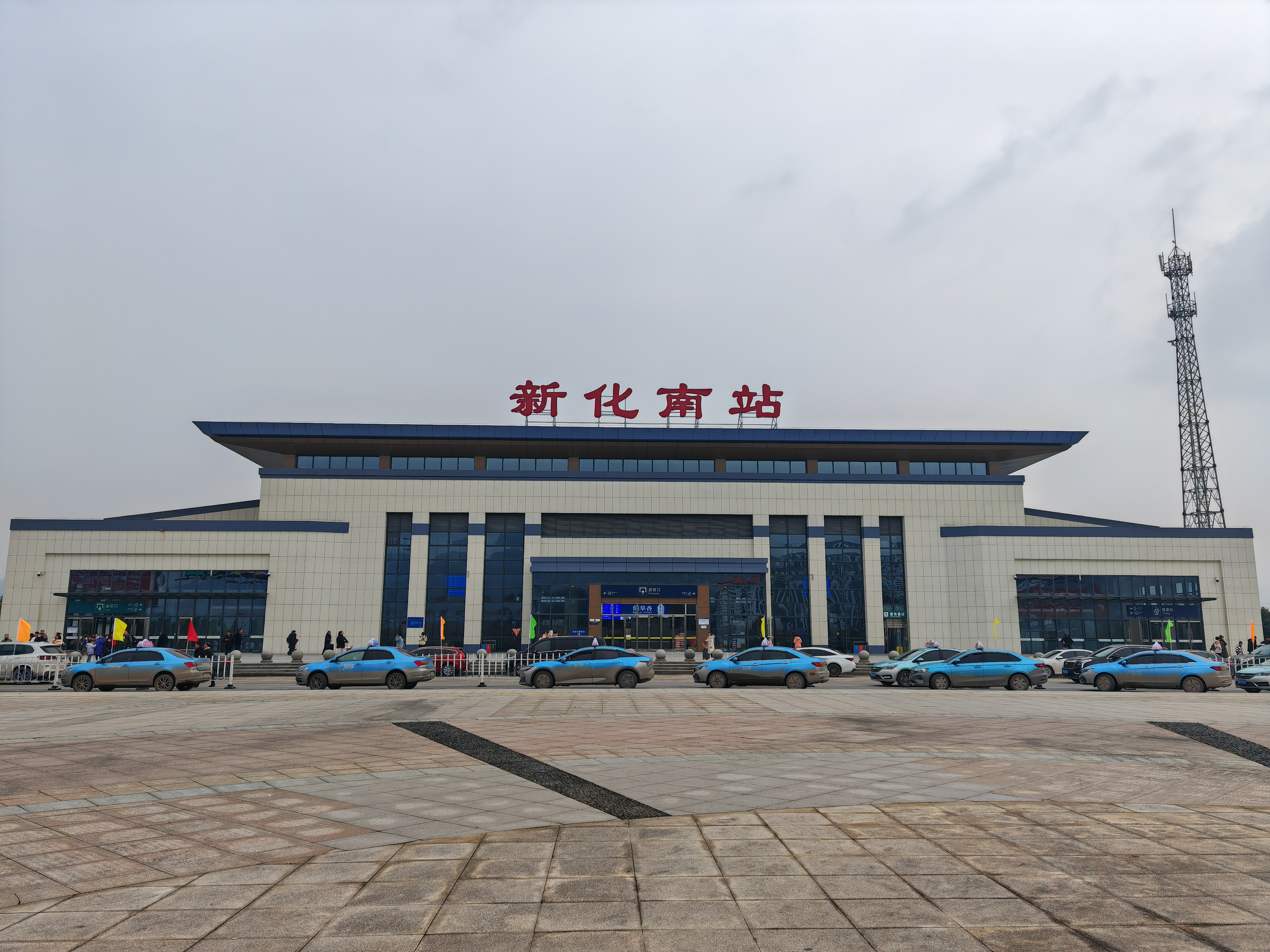
- Front square

General information
- Location: Xinhua County, Loudi City, Hunan Province; China
- Coordinates: 27.6581°N 111.1552°E
- Operated by: CR Guangzhou
- Line: Shanghai–Kunming high-speed railway
- Platforms: 2
- Tracks: 4

Other information
- Station code: 65672 (TMIS code); EJQ (telegraph code); XHN (Pinyin code)
- Classification: Third Class station

History
- Opened: 2014; 12 years ago

Services
Preceding station	China Railway High-speed	Following station
Shaoyang North towards Shanghai Hongqiao	Shanghai–Kunming high-speed railway	Xupu South towards Kunming South
Location

Xinhua South railway station is a railway station on the Changsha–Kunming section of the Shanghai–Kunming high-speed railway. It is located in Shuanghua Village, Yangxi Town, Xinhua County, Loudi, Hunan, People's Republic of China. The total area of the station is 11,499 square meters. The station is designed to have a maximum flow of over 5000 passengers a day.

Preceding station	China Railway High-speed	Following station
Shaoyang North towards Shanghai Hongqiao	Shanghai–Kunming high-speed railway	Xupu South towards Kunming South
