= Yangxi, Hunan =

Yangxi Town 洋溪镇
- Town
- Location in Hunan
- Coordinates: 27°40′08″N 111°10′40″E
- Country: People's Republic of China
- Province: Hunan
- Prefecture-level city: Loudi
- County: Xinhua

Area
  - Total: 132.8 km^{2} (51.3 sq mi)

Population
  - Total: 71,000
  - Density: 530/km^{2} (1,400/sq mi)
- Time zone: UTC+8 (China Standard)
- Postal code: 417628
- Area code: 0738

Yangxi Town (simplified Chinese: 洋溪镇; traditional Chinese: 洋溪鎮; pinyin: Yángxī Zhèn) is an urban town in Xinhua County, Hunan Province, People's Republic of China. It is the location of Xinhua South railway station.

== Administrative divisions ==
The town is divided into 61 villages and one community, which include the following areas:

- Xinxing Community
- Shanbei Village
- Changgangling Village
- Yachong Village
- Gutang Village
- Guanduqiao Village
- Jingping Village
- Mulong Village
- Baidi Village
- Baijing Village
- Baitang Village
- Taojiaqiao Village
- Jianxin Village
- Tangwan Village
- Lianxing Village
- Zhenlian Village
- Shanlian Village
- Jixing Village
- Xinyun Village
- Xinhe Village
- Dafanxi Village
- Xingxing Village
- Mingxing Village
- Yifeng Village
- Liuzhu Village
- Jinghua Village
- You'ai Village
- Shangche Village
- Longhuishan Village
- Chetianwan Village
- Longtanwan Village
- Xinqun Village
- Yumiaochang Village
- Changfengling Village
- Shuidong Village
- Qunyi Village
- Nanshanzhai Village
- Yuhua Village
- Jianhua Village
- Nanzhong Village
- Zhaibian Village
- Lengshuixiang Village
- Sanjing Village
- Shuanghua Village
- Shuangyuan Village
- Jianrong Village
- Shuangquan Village
- Zhongyi Village
- Shucai Village
- Dongchong Village
- Nitan Village
- Shiyan Village
- Shangsheng Village
- Longyandong Village
- Hejiadang Village
- Dajiangkou Village
- Cangxi Village
- Yueguangshan Village
- Hongfeng Village
- Longxing Village
- Huangniao Village
- Daijiadang Village
