= Panzhou–Xingyi high-speed railway =

Railway line in China

Overview
- Status: Operational
- Termini: Panzhou; Xingyi South
- Stations: 3

Service
- Type: Heavy rail

Technical
- Line length: 98.3 km (61 mi)
- Track gauge: 1,435 mm (4 ft 8 1/2 in) standard gauge
- Electrification: 50 Hz 25,000 V
- Operating speed: 250 km/h (155 mph)

The Panzhou–Xingyi high-speed railway is a high-speed railway line in China. It is 98.3 kilometres (61.1 mi) long and has a maximum speed of 250 kilometres per hour (160 mph). It was opened on 28 November 2025.

The northern terminus of the line is Panzhou railway station and the southern terminus is Xingyi South. There is one intermediate station, Baotian.
