= Shaoyang North railway station =

Railway station in Shaoyang, China

Shaoyangbei 邵阳北

General information
- Location: Pingshang, Xinshao District, Shaoyang, Hunan; China
- Coordinates: 27°34′27″N 111°30′16″E
- Operator: Guangzhou Railway Group
- Line: Shanghai–Kunming High-Speed Railway

Other information
- Station code: TMIS code: 65669; Telegraph code: OVQ; Pinyin code: SYB
- Classification: 3rd class station

History
- Opened: December 16, 2014
Location

Shaoyang North railway station is a railway station on the Changsha–Kunming section of the Shanghai–Kunming high-speed railway. It is located in Shaoyang, Hunan, People's Republic of China.

Shaoyang is also served by the much closer Shaoyang railway station.

== Controversy ==
There were 3 plans intended for the Changsha-Kunming segment of the Shanghai-Kunming HSR within Hunan province, 2 of which will pass Shaoyang city limits. As officials recommend the plan via Lengshuijiang and Xinhua on December during meetings in Changsha, signing petitions were held by residents of Shaoyang, dubbed as a modern version of the "Railway Protection Movement". On December 27, 2008, China Railway Design Group officials conducted pre-construction research in Shaoyang instead of Lengshuijiang and Xinhua, sparking similar controversies.

In the final plans, a station is set in Pingshang, Shaoyang; however, its extraordinary distance from Shaoyang city (over 50 km) have prompted it to be dubbed as one of the "four famous norths", the others being Yangquan North, Panjin North and Xiaogan North railway station. Its relative proximity to downtown Lengshuijiang and Xinhua, coupled with expressway access, have made Shaoyang North railway station the de facto railway station for these 2 cities.

Preceding station	China Railway High-speed	Following station
Loudi South towards Shanghai Hongqiao	Shanghai–Kunming high-speed railway	Xinhua South towards Kunming South
