= Pingba South railway station =

Chinese train station

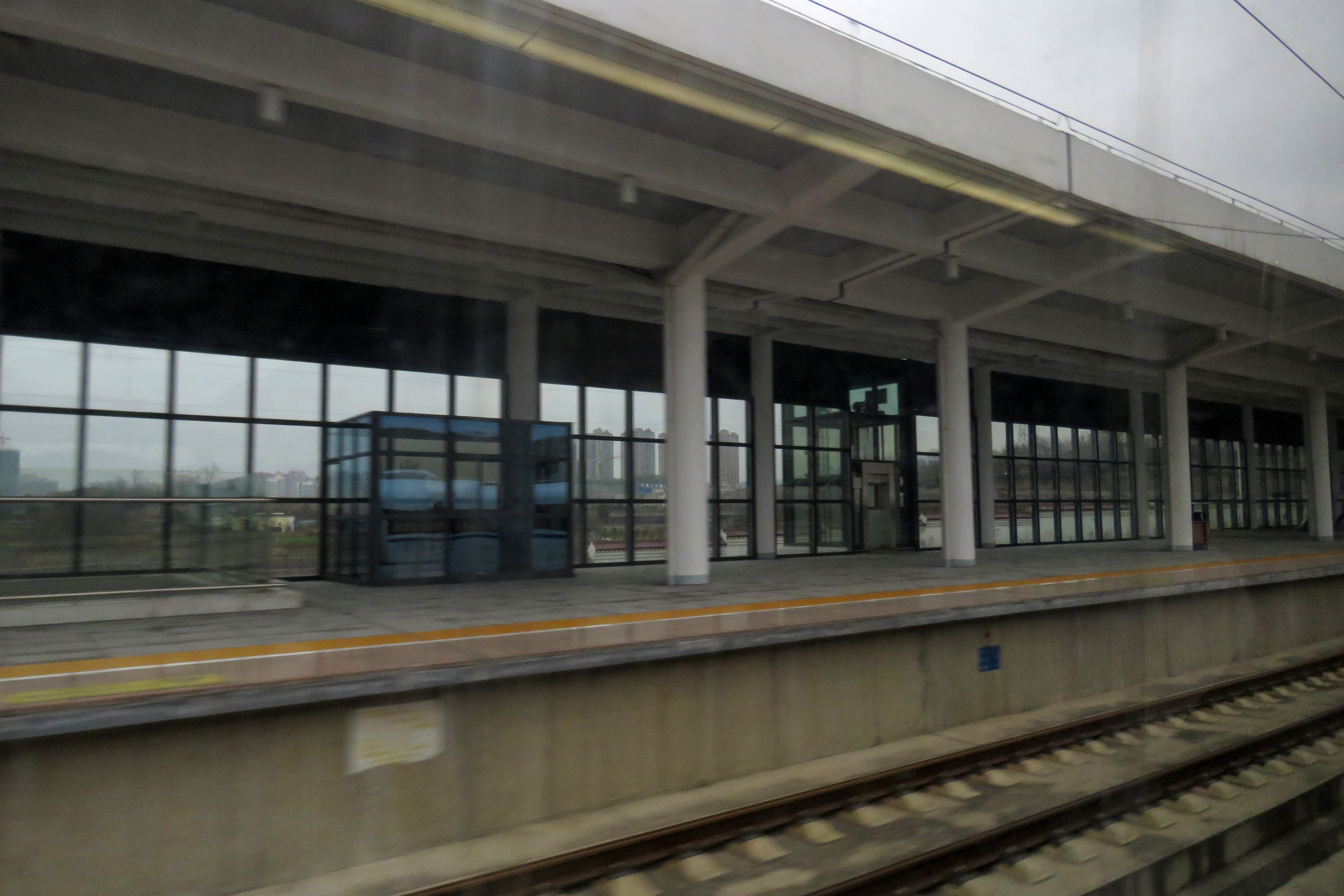
Platform of Pingbanan Railway Station

Pingba South railway station is a railway station of Hangchangkun Passenger Railway located in Guizhou, People's Republic of China.

The entrance to this station is situated around 0.5 kilometres (0.31 mi) southwest of the entrance to Xinpingba railway station on the Shanghai–Kunming railway, however, the two are not directly linked.

Preceding station	China Railway High-speed	Following station
Guiyang North towards Shanghai Hongqiao	Shanghai–Kunming high-speed railway	Anshun West towards Kunming South
