= Songming railway station =

Railway station in Yunnan, China

Coordinates: 25.242476°N 103.135560°E

Songming 嵩明站
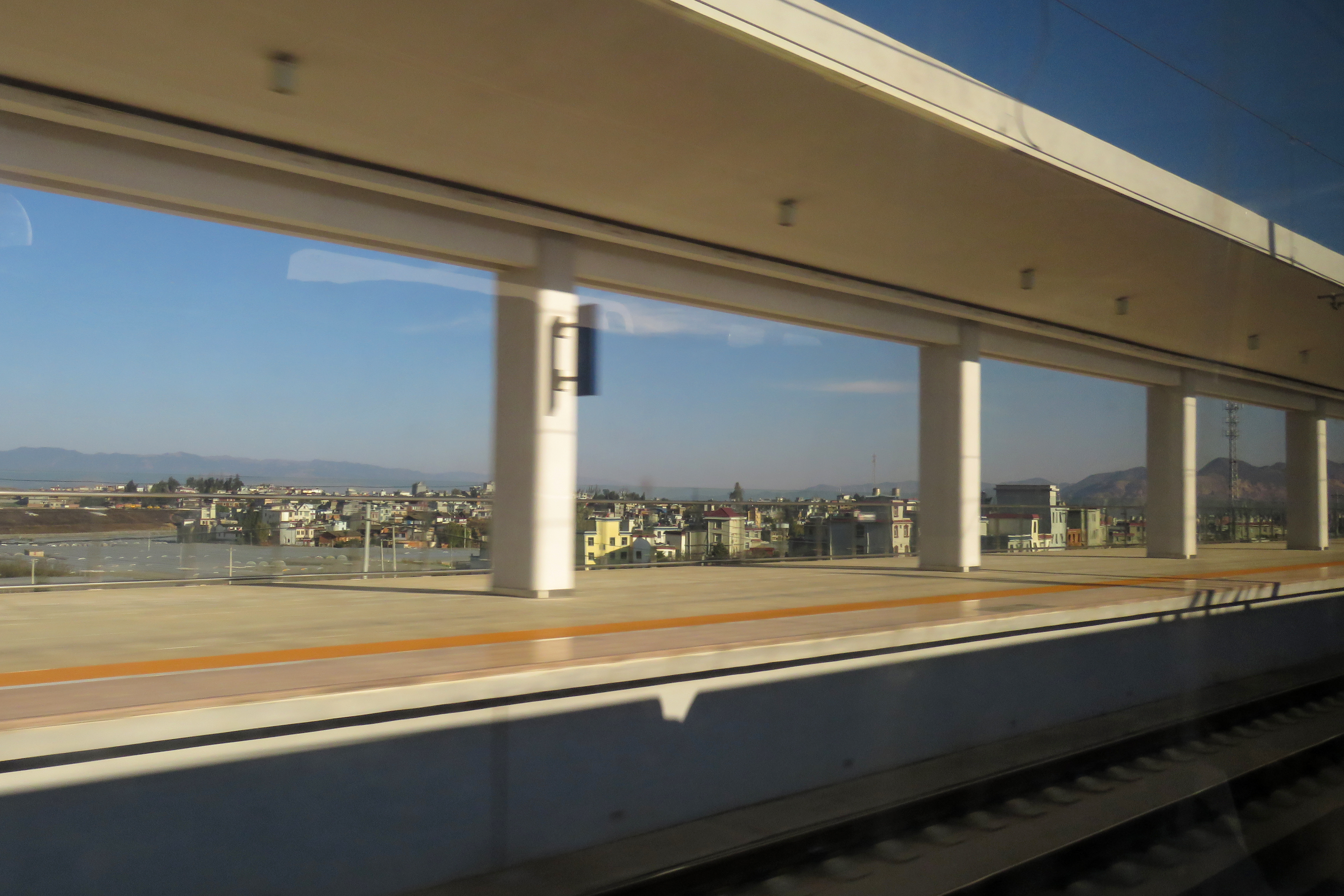

General information
- Location: Songming County, Kunming, Yunnan; China
- Line: Hangchangkun Passenger Railway

Other information
- Station code: SVM
Location

Songming railway station is a railway station of Hangchangkun Passenger Railway located in Yunnan, People's Republic of China.

| Preceding station | China Railway High-speed | Following station |
|---|---|---|
| Qujing North towards Shanghai Hongqiao | Shanghai–Kunming high-speed railway | Kunming South Terminus |
