= Kaili South railway station =

Railway station in Kaili City, China

Kaili South 凯里南
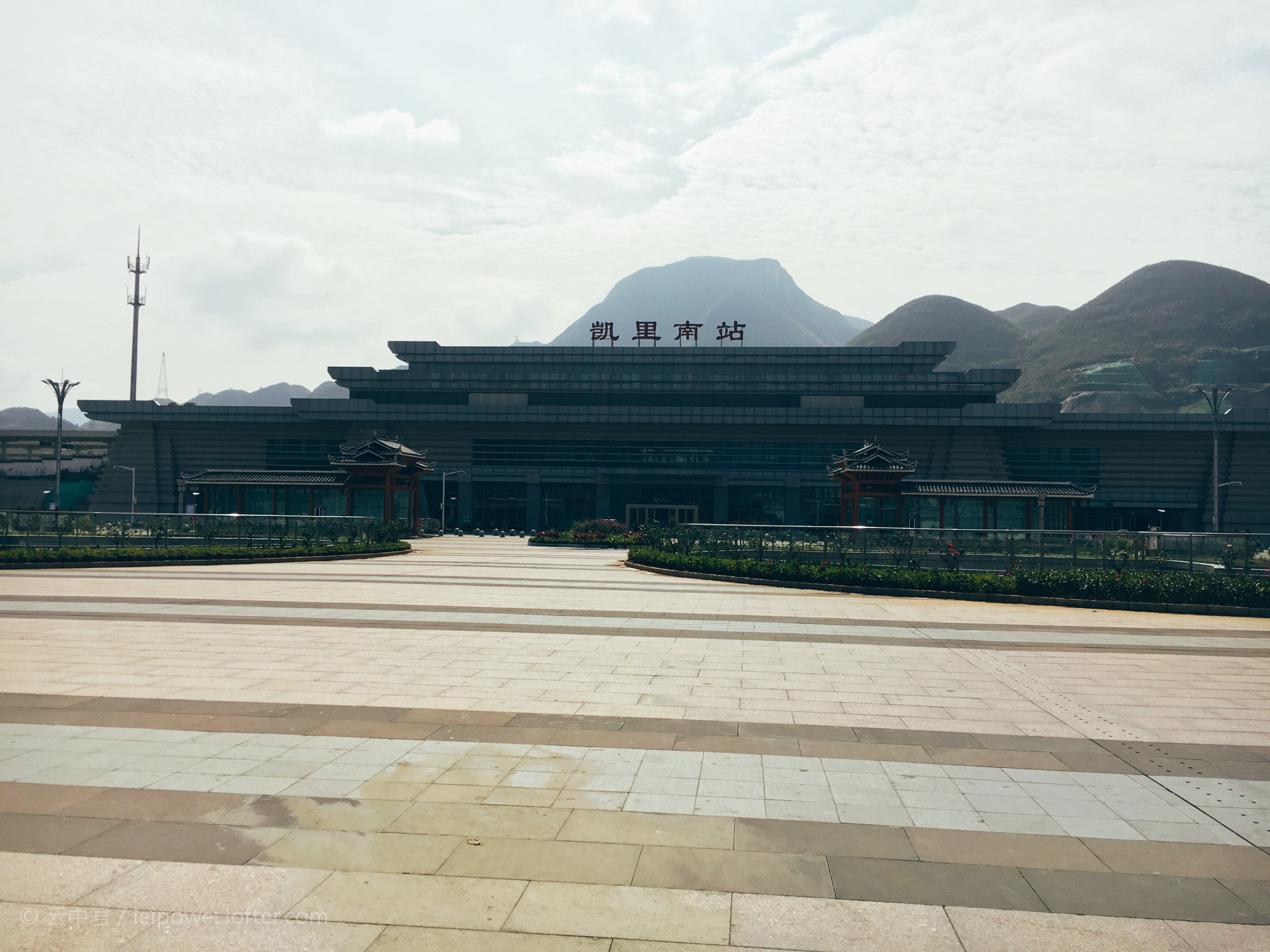

Chinese name
- Simplified Chinese: 凯里南站
- Traditional Chinese: 凱里南站
Transcriptions
Standard Mandarin
- Hanyu Pinyin: Kǎilǐ Nán Zhàn

General information
- Location: Intersection of Kaiyuan Avenue and Longtou River Bridge, Kaihuai Subdistrict, Kaili City, Qiandongnan Miao and Dong Autonomous Prefecture, Guizhou Province; China
- Coordinates: 26.5441°N 107.9727°E
Location

Kaili South railway station is a railway station of Hangchangkun Passenger Railway located in Guizhou, China.

It is an important high-speed railway station. It is a stop on the Shanghai-Kunming High-Speed Railway, serving passengers traveling between Shanghai and Kunming. The opening of Kaili South Railway Station has significantly improved transportation convenience and economic development in Kaili City and the surrounding areas.

== Overview ==
Kaili South Railway Station is located in the Qiandongnan Miao and Dong Autonomous Prefecture of Guizhou Province, China. It is a first-class station under the jurisdiction of Guiyang Station, part of the China Railway Chengdu Group Co., Ltd., and serves as an intermediate station on the Shanghai-Kunming High-Speed Railway.

Construction of Kaili South Railway Station began in September 2010, and it was completed and put into operation on June 18, 2015.

As of June 2015, Kaili South Railway Station has a building area of 19,215 square meters and is designed to accommodate a maximum of 2,000 people. The station yard has a scale of 3 platforms and 7 tracks.

== Architectural Scale ==
=== Design Concept ===
The Kaili South Railway Station building is a trapezoidal structure in brown and white, inspired by the Dong people's Wind and Rain Bridge. It features four tiered piers, with a total of 11 levels, resembling a drum tower. The top level supports the bridge deck, which has three levels, gradually narrowing from bottom to top. This design, along with the Lusheng Culture Square in front of the station and the three drum towers on the north side of the station building, showcases the distinctive Dong ethnic characteristics.

=== Design Parameters ===
As of June 2015, Kaili South Railway Station has a building area of 19,215 square meters. The station building is 2,500 meters long from east to west and 300 to 600 meters wide from north to south. It is designed to accommodate a maximum of 2,000 people. The square in front of the station covers an area of 59,000 square meters. The underground shopping mall has an area of 30,000 square meters, and the underground parking lot covers 44,000 square meters. The bus and long-distance passenger terminal area is 21,000 square meters.

=== Overall Layout ===
The Kaili South Railway Station building has two floors. The first floor is designated for arrivals and departures, with ticket offices, entrance gates, and exit gates. The second floor is designated as the waiting area. The supporting facilities of Kaili South Railway Station consist of three layers: the ground level is a leisure square divided into the passenger waiting square and the Lusheng Culture Square. The first underground level is a commercial area offering leisure, dining, and shopping. The second underground level is an underground parking lot.

== Station service ==
As of June 2015, the ticket hall at Kaili South Railway Station is equipped with seven automatic ticket machines.

The ticket hall at Kaili South Railway Station also has a temporary travel ID printer. If passengers forget their ID, they can go to the ticket office and use facial recognition to print a temporary ID.

Kaili South Railway Station supports convenient transfers within the station.

As of May 2018, the parking lot at Kaili South Railway Station is equipped with electric vehicle charging stations.

As of June 2015, Kaili South Railway Station has an underground parking lot available for self-driving cars.

== See also ==
- Shanghai railway station

Preceding station	China Railway High-speed	Following station
Sansui towards Shanghai Hongqiao	Shanghai–Kunming high-speed railway	Guiding North towards Kunming South
