= Shaoshan South railway station =

Railway station in Hunan, China

Coordinates: 27.8917°N 112.5423°E

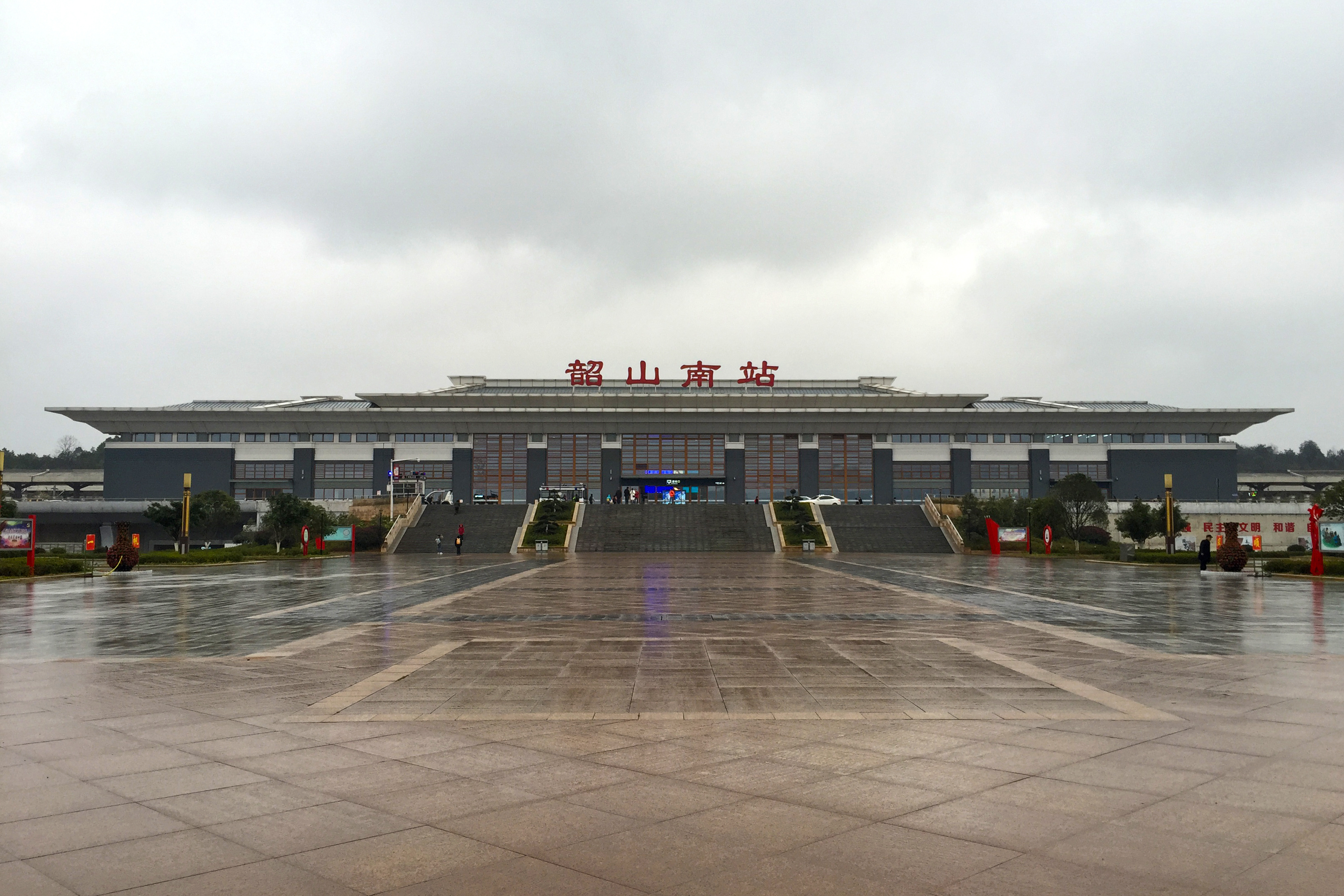
The station building in February 2018

Shaoshan South railway station is a railway station of the Shanghai–Kunming high-speed railway located in Hunan, People's Republic of China.

Shaoshan South railway station is well appointed and spacious, and has a regular and fast train service from Changsha South. There are buses at the station that offer inexpensive transfer to Shaoshan and Mao's birthplace village.

Preceding station	China Railway High-speed	Following station
Xiangtan North towards Shanghai Hongqiao	Shanghai–Kunming high-speed railway	Loudi South towards Kunming South
