= Panzhou railway station =

Railway station in Panzhou, China

Panzhou railway station 盘州站
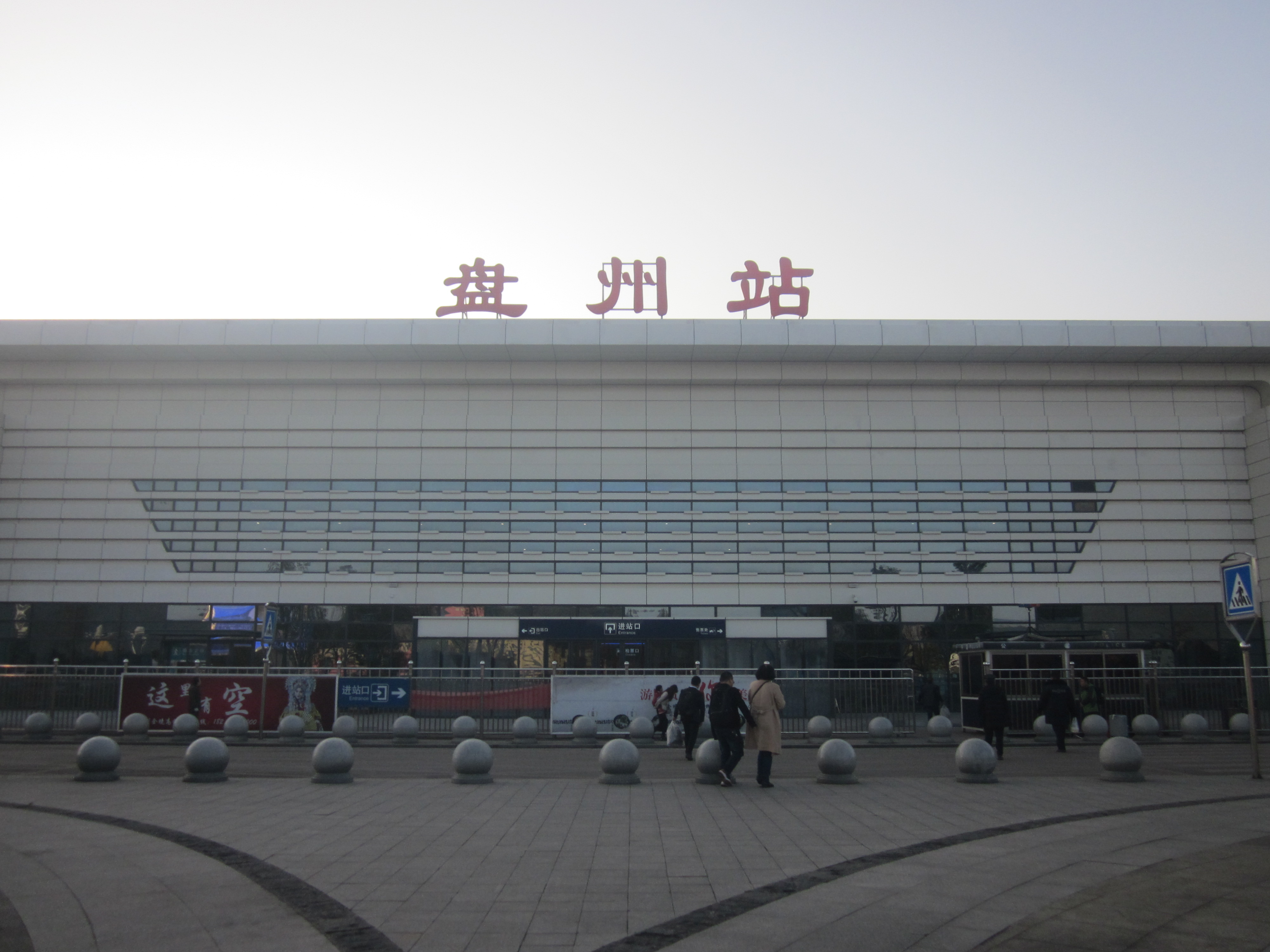
- Panzhou Railway Station.

General information
- Location: Panzhou, Guizhou; China
- Coordinates: 25.79543°N 104.56565°E
- Operated by: China Railway
- Lines: Shanghai–Kunming high-speed railway Panzhou–Xingyi high-speed railway (under construction)

Other information
- Station code: Telegraph code: PAE; Pinyin code: PZH
- Classification: 2nd class station

History
- Opened: 28 December 2016
Location

Panzhou station (simplified Chinese: 盘州站; traditional Chinese: 盤州站; pinyin: Pánzhōu Zhàn) is a railway station located in Panzhou, a county-level city in Guizhou. It is on the Panzhou–Xingyi high-speed railway line, set to begin service on November 30, 2025. The station has been renovated and newly expanded for the launch of the high-speed railway. The station is also served by the Shanghai–Kunming high-speed railway since December 16, 2016.

Preceding station	China Railway High-speed	Following station
Pu'anxian towards Shanghai Hongqiao	Shanghai–Kunming high-speed railway	Fuyuan North towards Kunming South
