= Qujing North railway station =

Railway station in Qujing, China

Coordinates: 25.5897°N 103.7829°E

Qujing North 曲靖北站
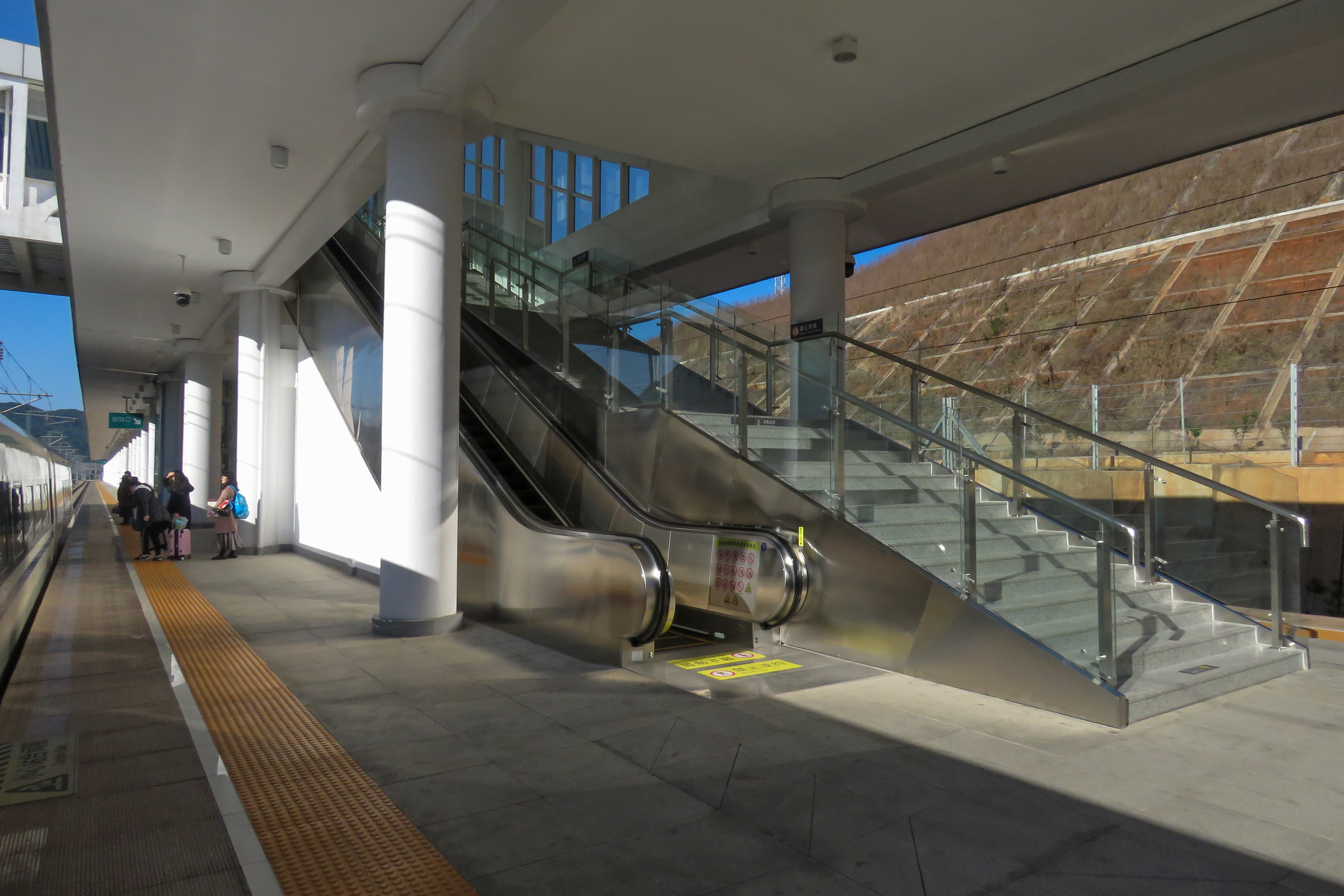

General information
- Location: Zhanyi District, Qujing, Yunnan; China
- Line: Hangchangkun Passenger Railway

Other information
- Station code: QBM
Location

Qujing North railway station is a railway station of Hangchangkun Passenger Railway located in Zhanyi district, Qujing, Yunnan, People's Republic of China.

Preceding station	China Railway High-speed	Following station
Fuyuan North towards Shanghai Hongqiao	Shanghai–Kunming high-speed railway	Songming towards Kunming South
