= Anshun West railway station =

Railway station in Anshun, China

Coordinates: 26.2342°N 105.9392°E

Anshun West 安顺西站
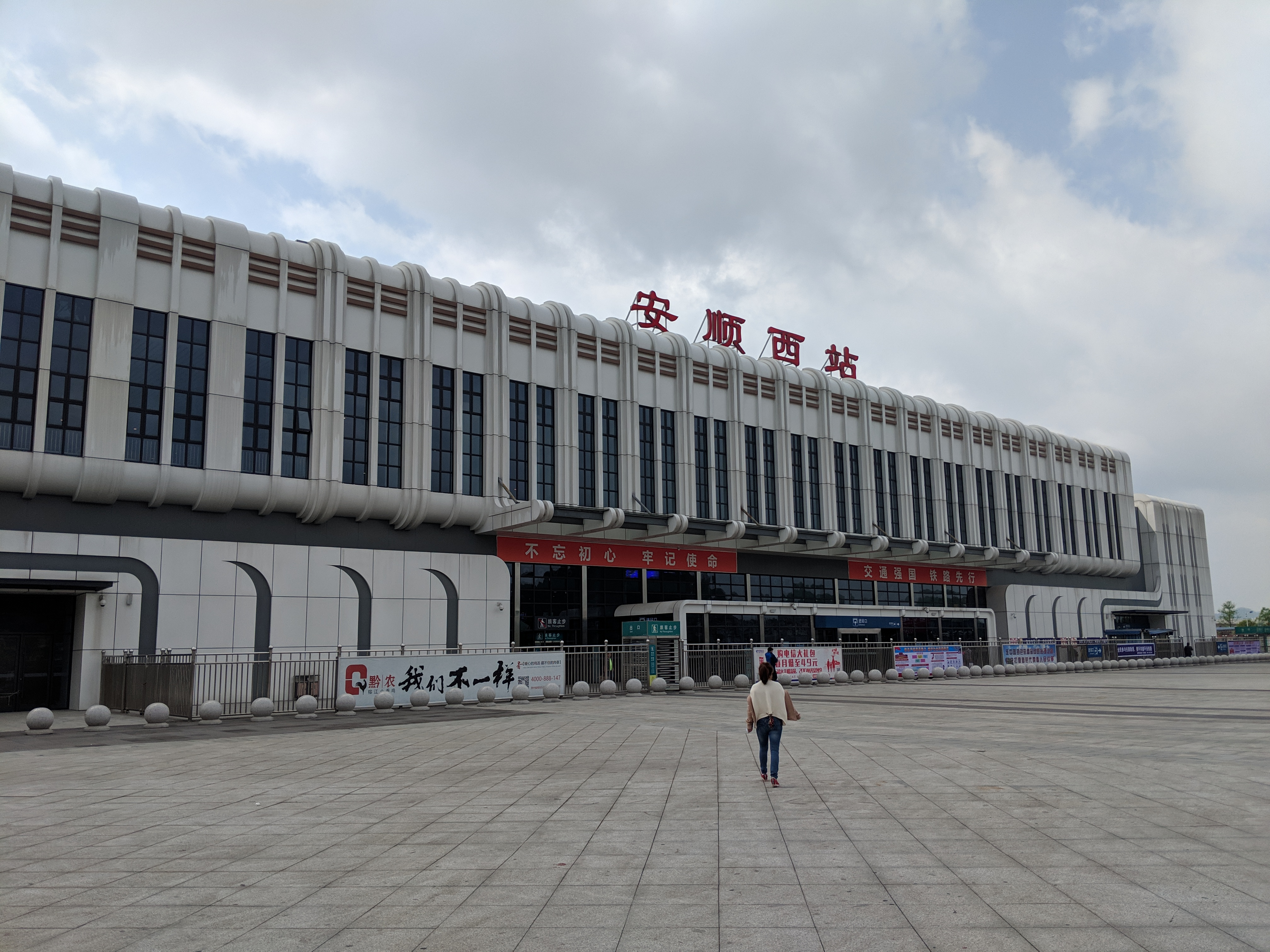
- West Anshun Railway station in April 2019.

General information
- Location: Anshun, Guizhou; China
- Operator: Hangchangkun Passenger Railway
- Lines: Shanghai–Kunming high-speed railway Anshun–Liupanshui intercity railway

Other information
- Station code: Telegraph code: ASE; Pinyin code: ASX

History
- Opened: 28 December 2016
Location

Anshun West railway station (simplified Chinese: 安顺西站; traditional Chinese: 安順西站; pinyin: Ānshùn Xīzhàn) is a railway station of Shanghai–Kunming high-speed railway in Guizhou, People's Republic of China.

== Station information ==
Anshun West railway station is located in the Economic Development Zone of Anshun City in Guizhou.

The station began operation on 28 December, 2016.

It was reported that the station would have a daily passenger count of about 100,000 during the Chinese New Year holiday. The station faced difficulties handling more than 15,000 passengers simultaneously during the holiday. Station staff has to be additionally deployed to handle the situation.

Preceding station	China Railway High-speed	Following station
Pingba South towards Shanghai Hongqiao	Shanghai–Kunming high-speed railway	Guanling towards Kunming South
Terminus	Anshun–Liupanshui intercity railway	Huangtong North towards Liupanshui
