= Fuyuan North railway station =

Railway station in Qujing, China

Fuyuanbei 富源北
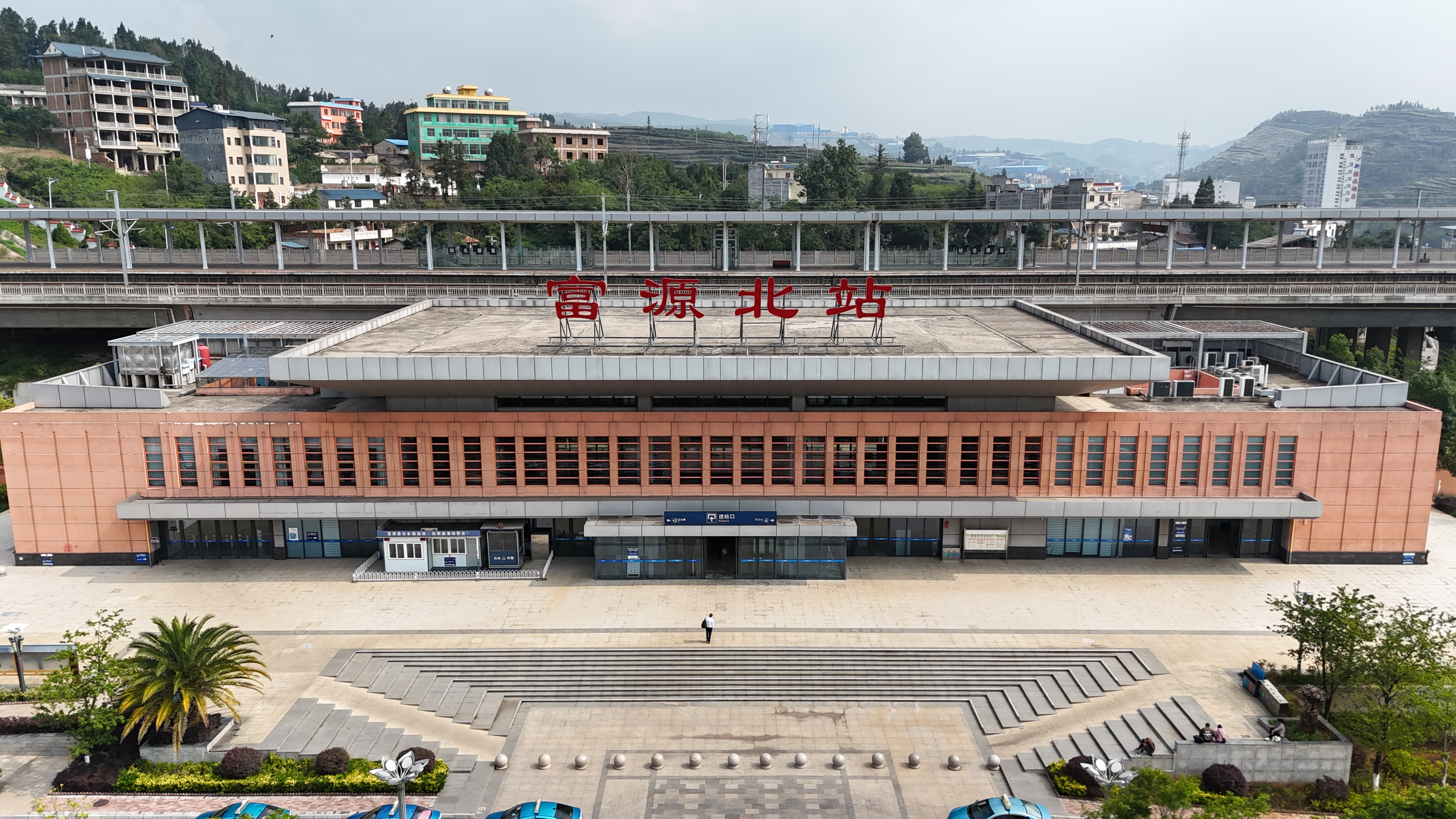

General information
- Location: Fuyuan County, Qujing, Yunnan; China
- Coordinates: 25.716387°N 104.268482°E
- Operated by: Kunming Railway Bureau, China Railway Corporation
- Line: Shanghai–Kunming High-Speed Railway
- Platforms: 1 island platform

Other information
- Station code: 65574; FBM; FYB

Services
Preceding station	China Railway High-speed	Following station
Panzhou towards Shanghai Hongqiao	Shanghai–Kunming high-speed railway	Qujing North towards Kunming South
Location

Fuyuan North railway station is a railway station of Hangchangkun Passenger Railway located in Fuyuan County, Qujing, Yunnan, China.

It has one island platform.
