= Sansui railway station =

Railway station in Guizhou, China

Coordinates: 26.96913°N 108.64764°E

Sansui railway station is a railway station of Hangchangkun Passenger Railway located in Guizhou, People's Republic of China.

Preceding station	China Railway High-speed	Following station
Tongren South towards Shanghai Hongqiao	Shanghai–Kunming high-speed railway	Kaili South towards Kunming South
