= Pu'anxian railway station =

Railway station in Guizhou, China

Pu'anxian 普安县站
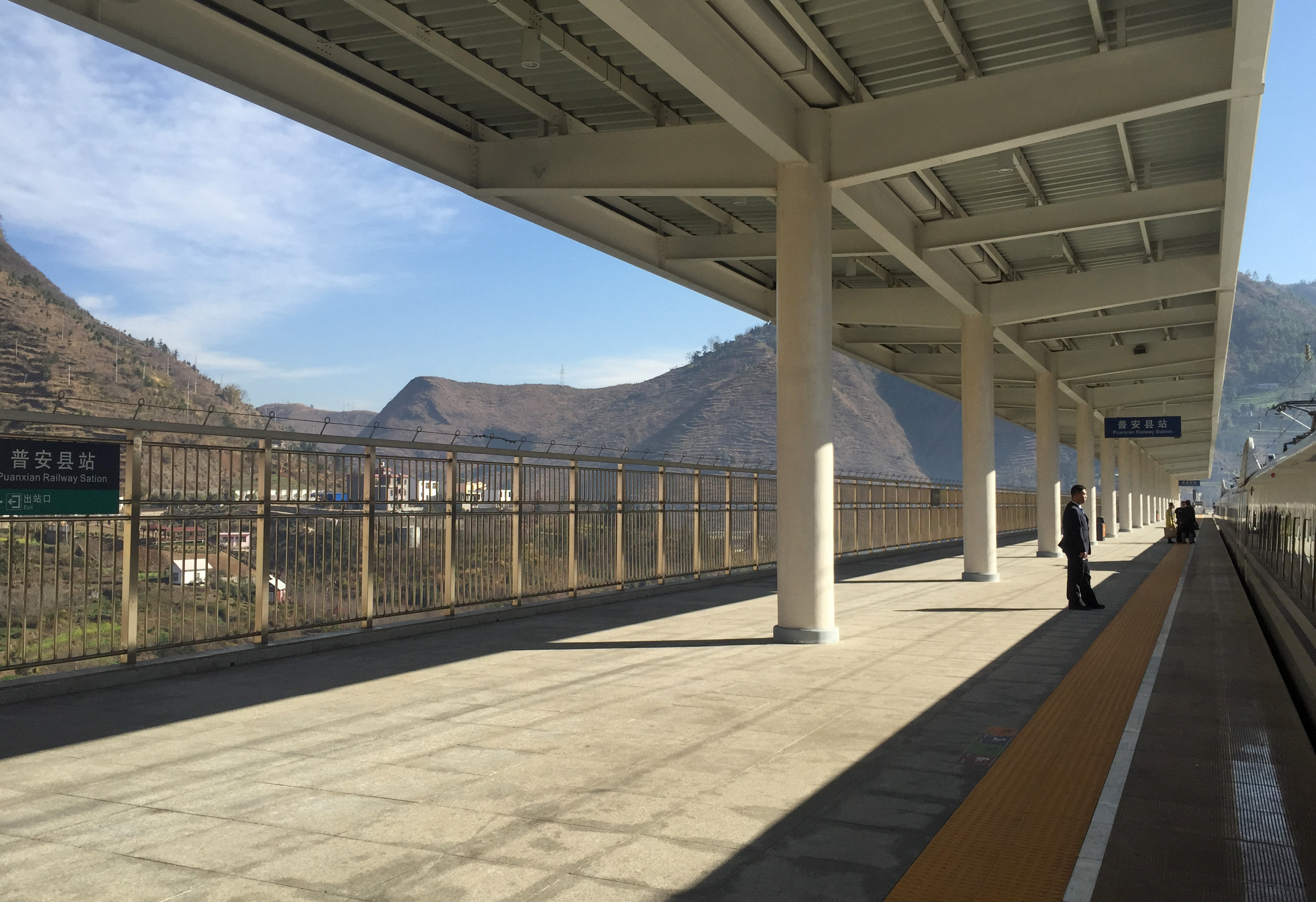

General information
- Location: Panzhou / Pu'an County border, Guizhou; China
- Line: Hangchangkun Passenger Railway

Other information
- Station code: PUE
Location

Pu'anxian railway station (literally Pu'an County railway station) is a railway station of Hangchangkun Passenger Railway located in Guizhou, People's Republic of China, nearby Hutiaohe Bridge.

Preceding station	China Railway High-speed	Following station
Guanling towards Shanghai Hongqiao	Shanghai–Kunming high-speed railway	Panzhou towards Kunming South
