= Guiding North railway station =

Railway station in Guizhou, China

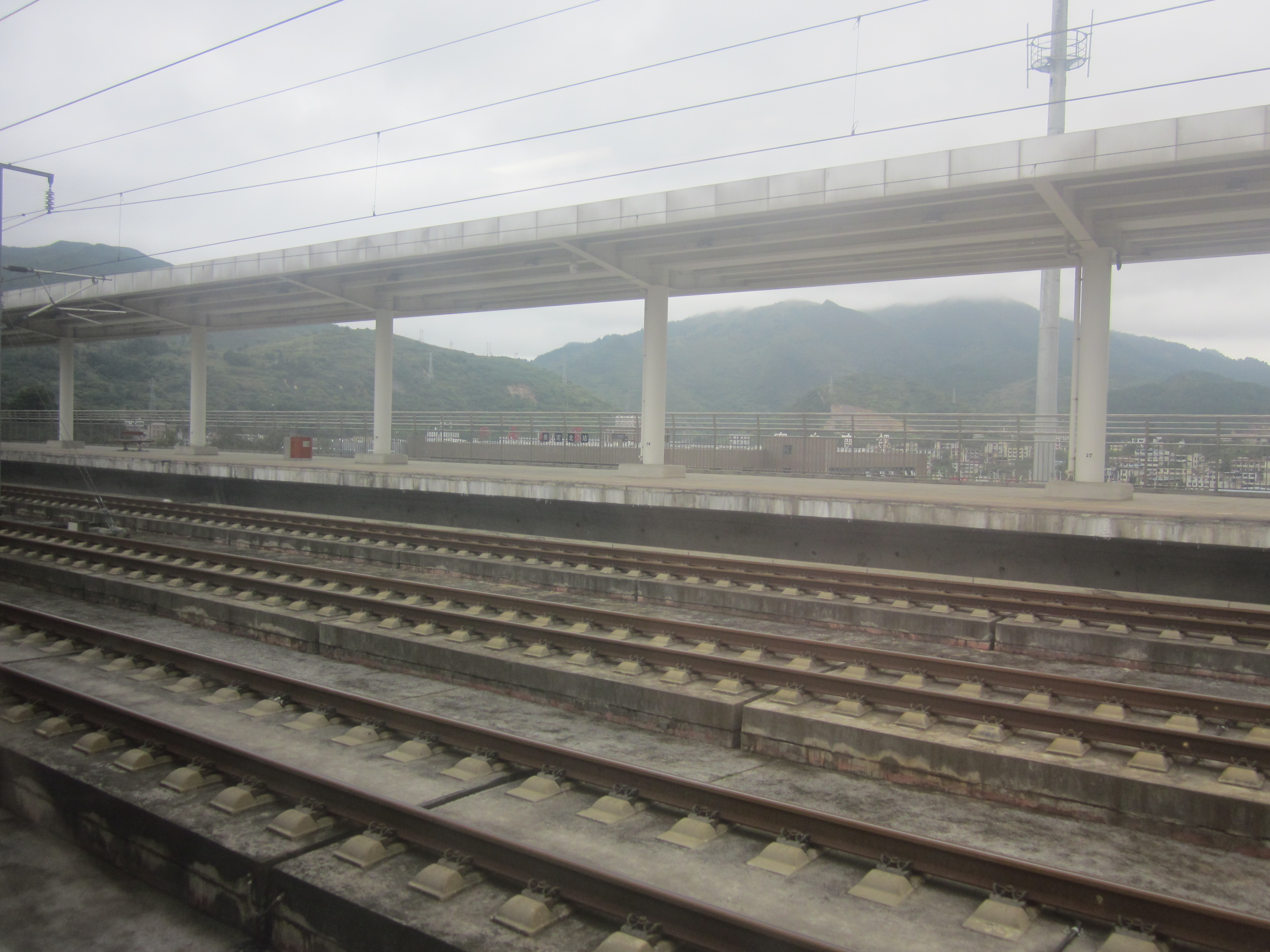
Platform of Guiding North railway station

Guiding North railway station is a railway station of Hangchangkun Passenger Railway located in Guizhou, People's Republic of China.

Preceding station	China Railway High-speed	Following station
Kaili South towards Shanghai Hongqiao	Shanghai–Kunming high-speed railway	Guiyang East towards Kunming South
