= Guanling railway station =

Railway station in Guizhou, China

Guanling 关岭站
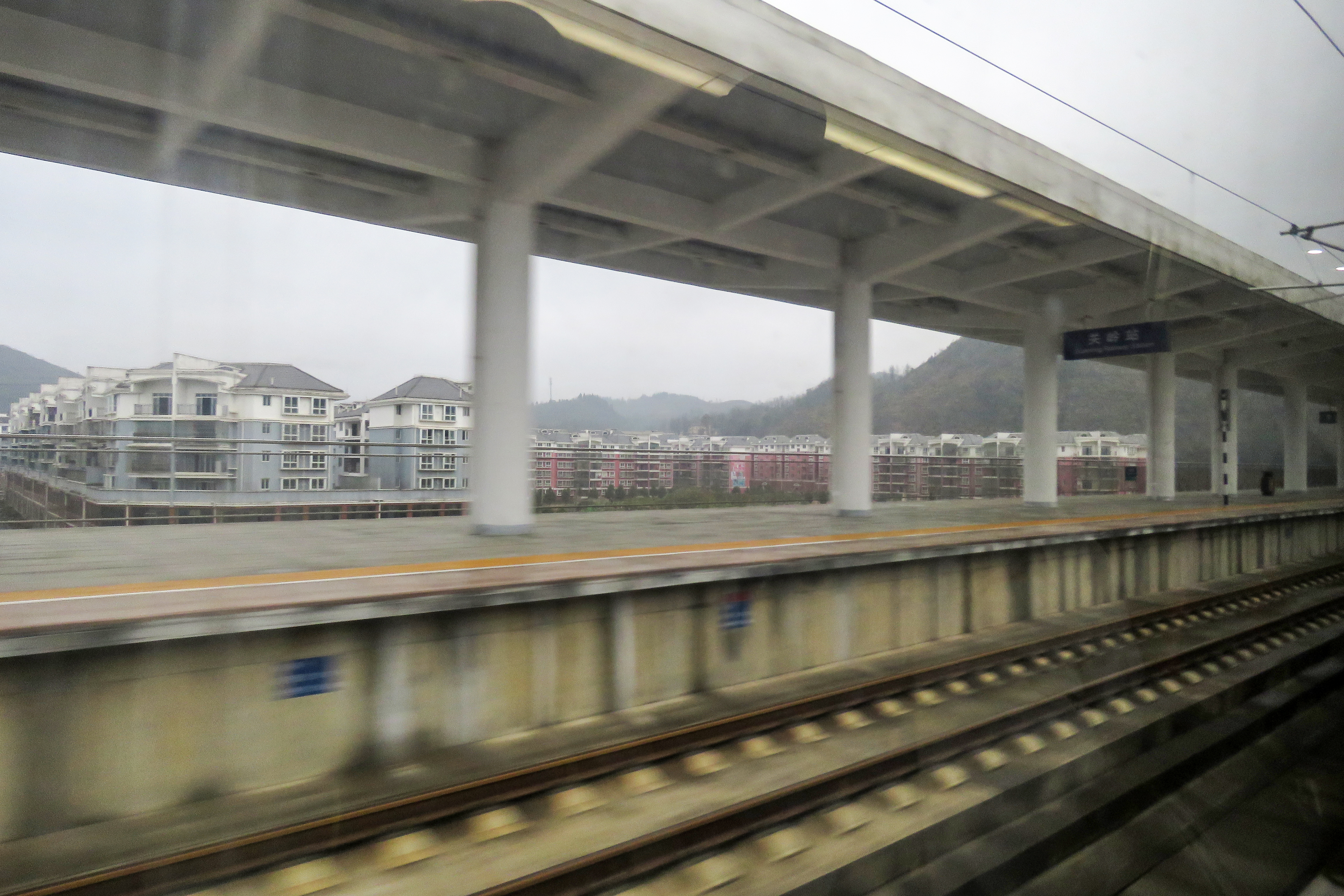

General information
- Location: Guanling County, Anshun, Guizhou; China
- Coordinates: 25.9682°N 105.5250°E
- Line: Hangchangkun Passenger Railway

Other information
- Station code: GLE
Location

Guanling railway station is a railway station of Hangchangkun Passenger Railway located in Guizhou, People's Republic of China.

Preceding station	China Railway High-speed	Following station
Anshun West towards Shanghai Hongqiao	Shanghai–Kunming high-speed railway	Pu'anxian towards Kunming South
