= Wenzhou =

Wenzhou 温州市 Wenchow, Iu Tsiu, Dong Ou
- Prefecture-level city
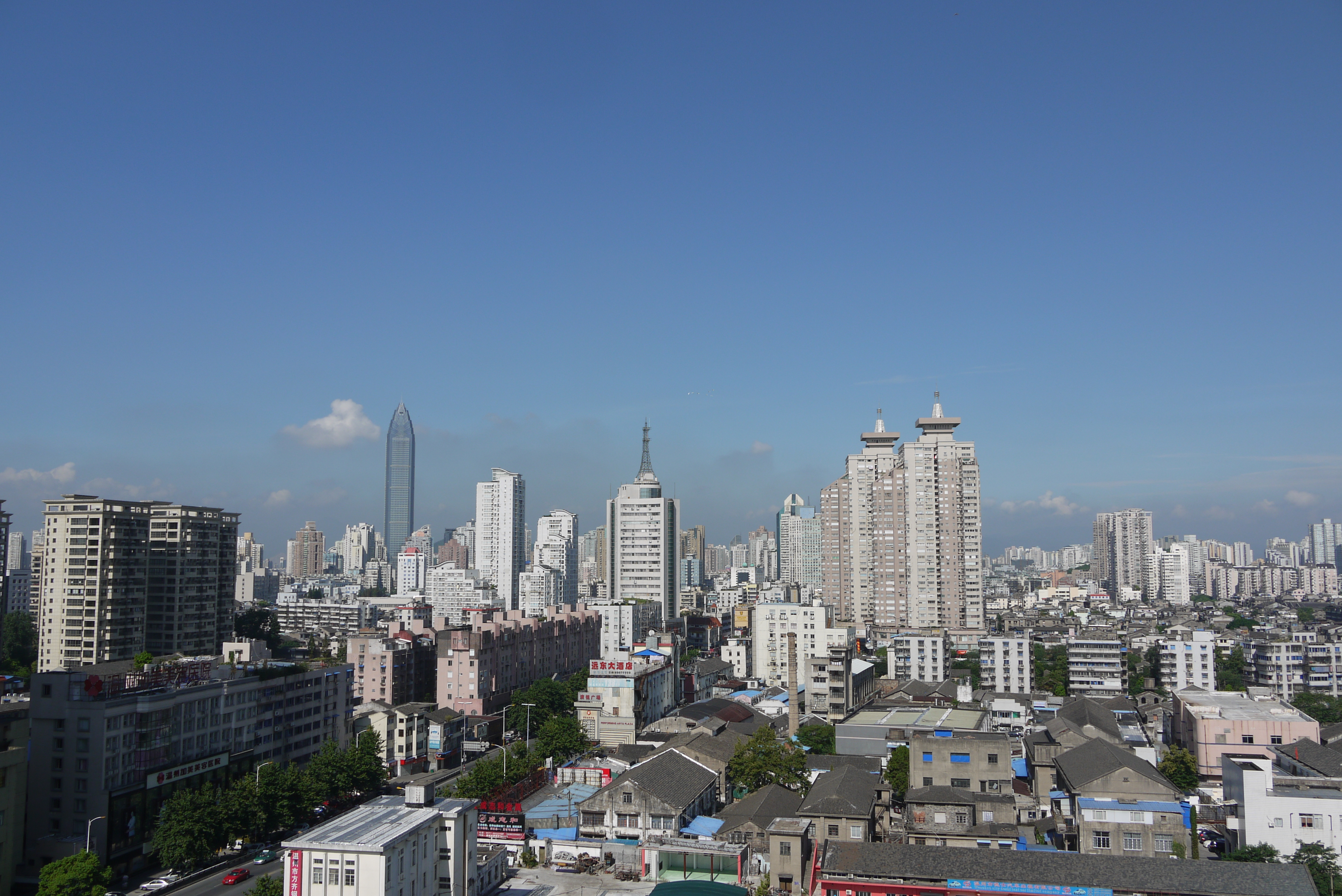
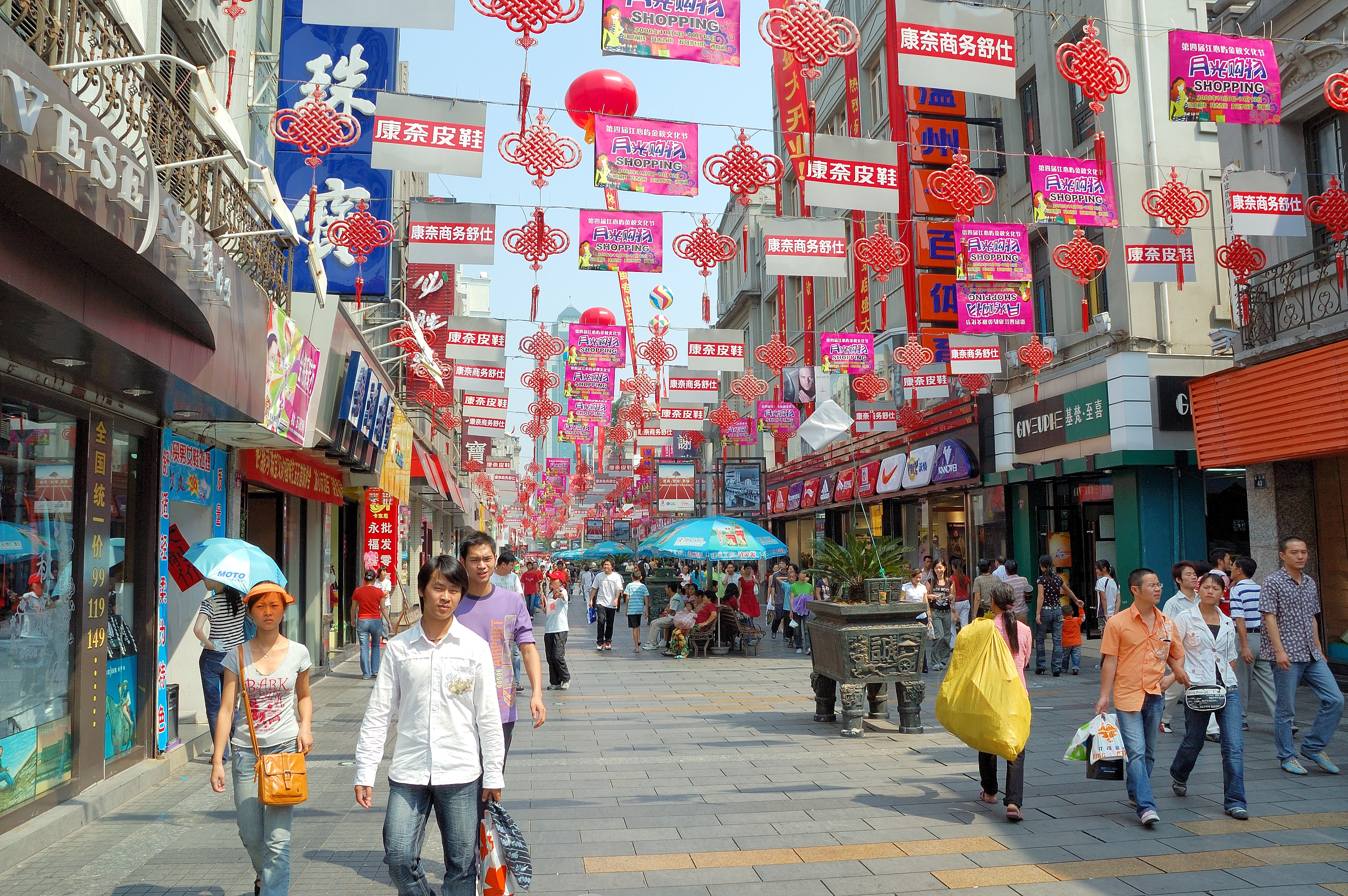
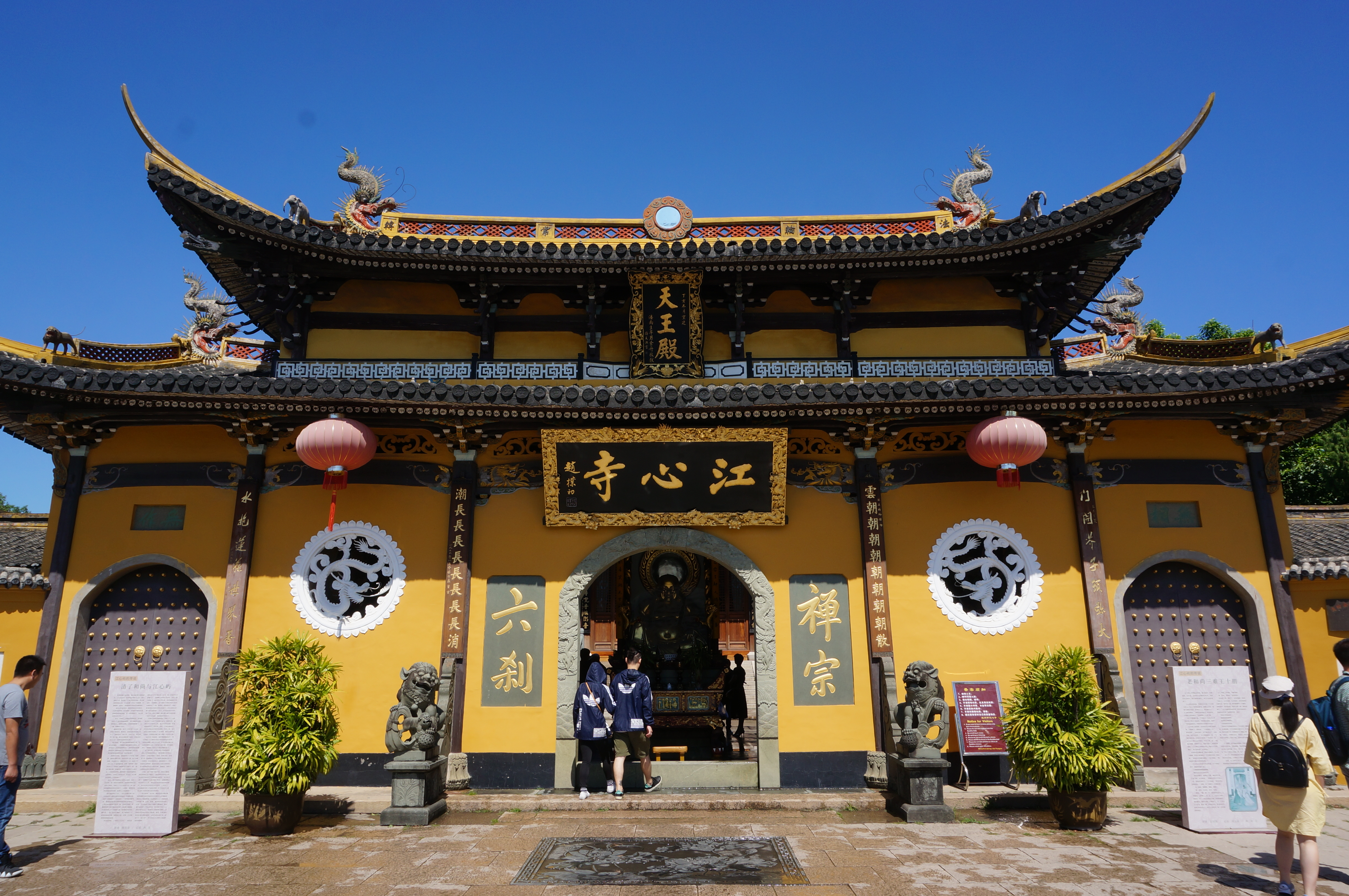
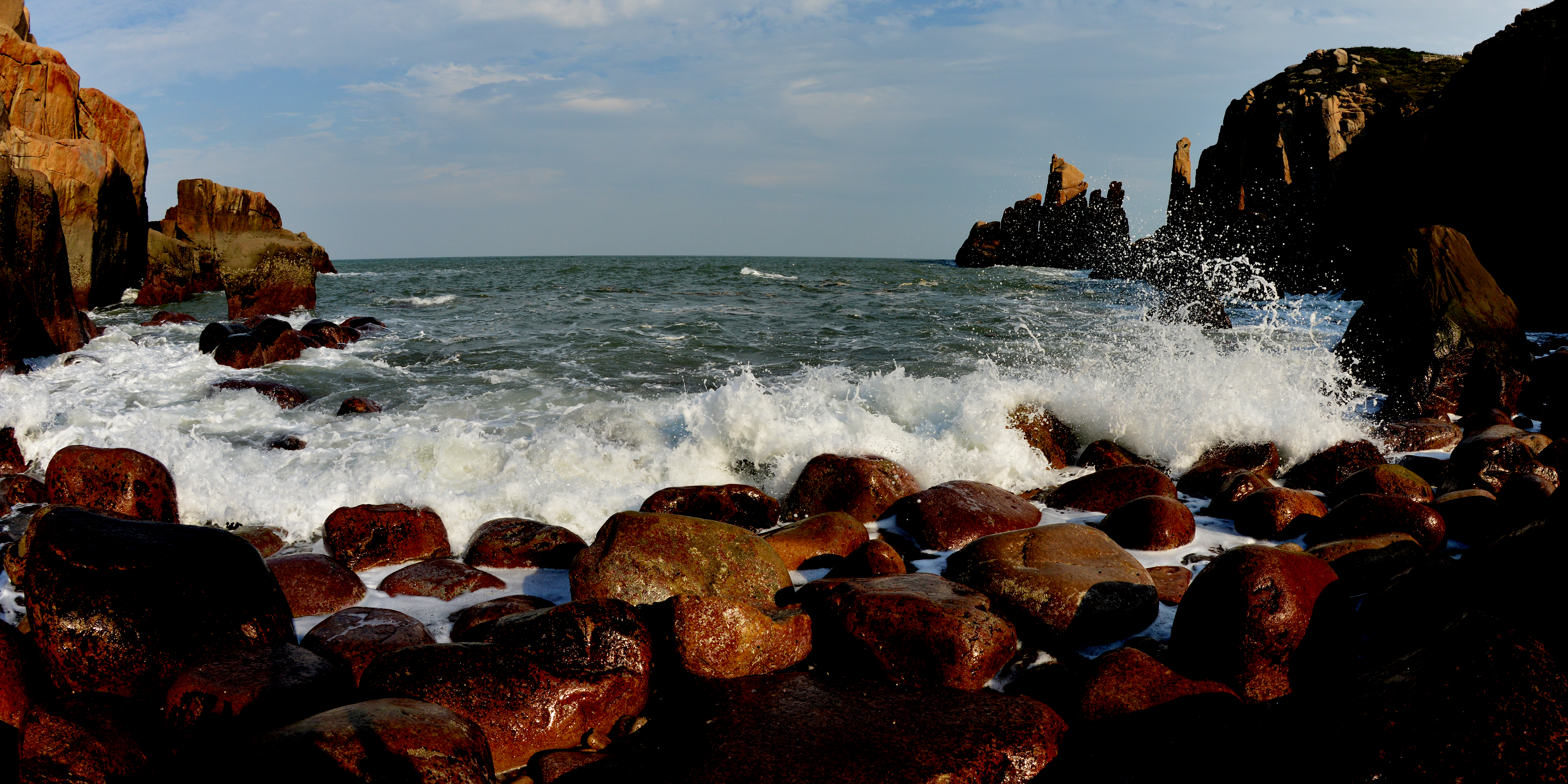
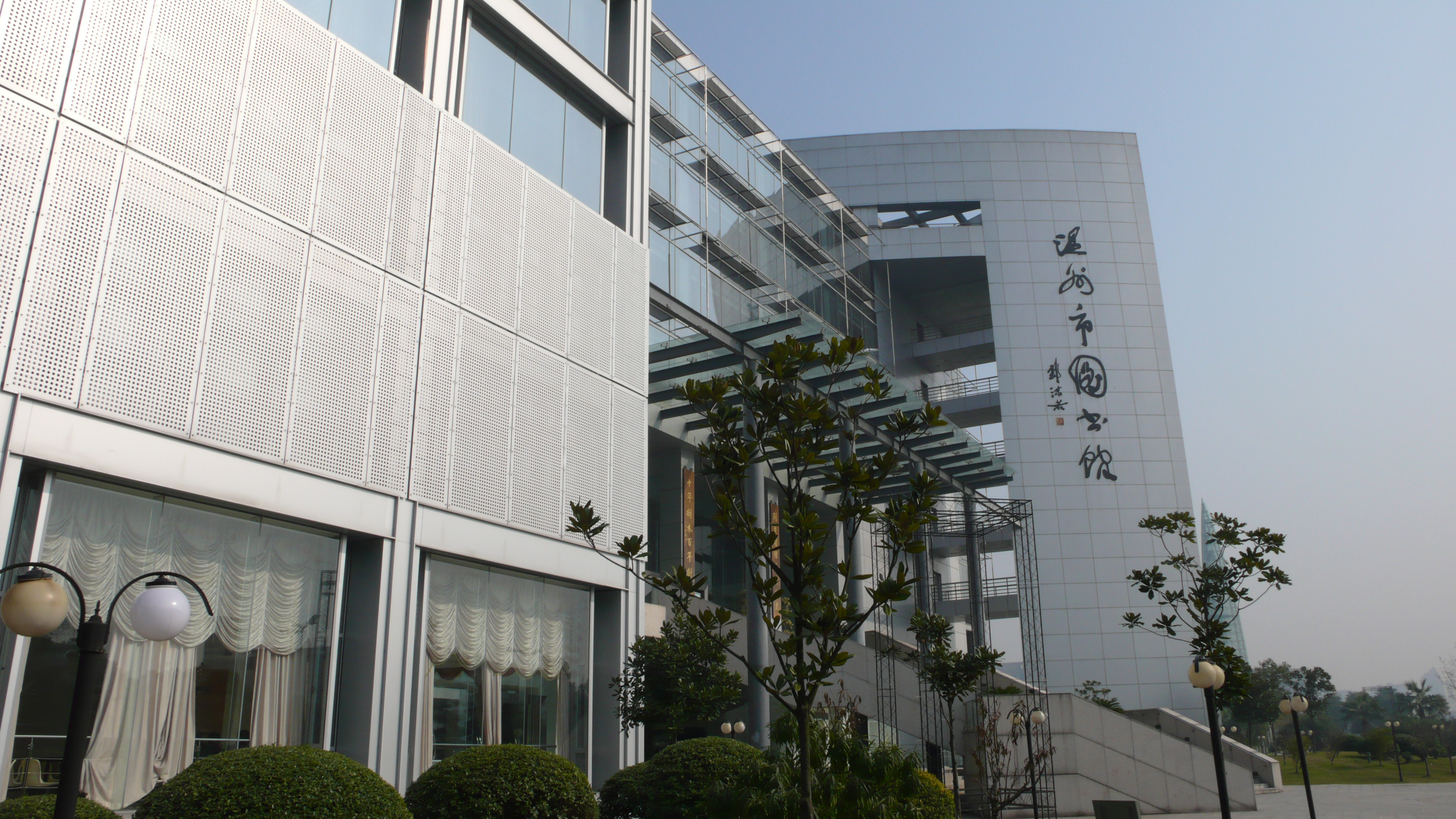
- Wenzhou skyline Wuma shopping street Jiangxin Temple Pearl Beach Wenzhou Library

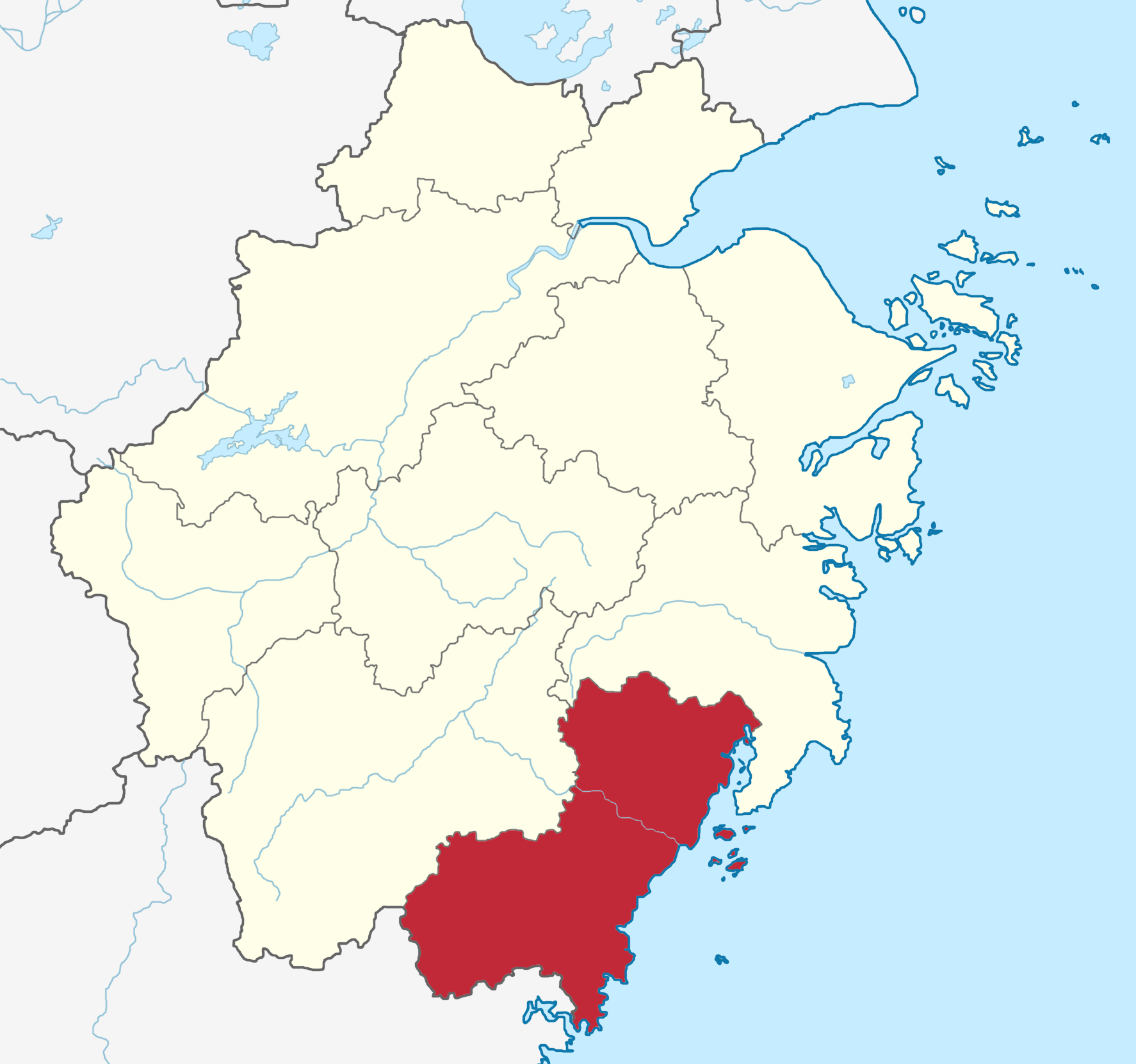
- Location of Wenzhou City jurisdiction in Zhejiang

- Location in China
- Coordinates (Wenzhou municipal government): 27°59′38″N 120°41′57″E
- Country: China
- Province: Zhejiang
- County-level divisions: 9
- Municipal seat: Lucheng District

Government
  - CPC City Secretary: Zhang Zhenfeng (张振丰)
  - Mayor: Zhang Wenjie (张文杰)

Area
  - Land: 12,255.74 km^{2} (4,731.97 sq mi)
  - Urban: 1,243.4 km^{2} (480.1 sq mi)

Population (2020 census)
  - Prefecture-level city: 9,572,903
  - Urban: 3,604,446
  - Urban density: 2,898.9/km^{2} (7,508.0/sq mi)
  - Metro: 6,642,592
  - Rank in China: 15th

GDP
  - Prefecture-level city: CN¥ 1.02 trillion US$ 143.0 billion
  - Per capita: CN¥ 106,696; US$ 14,937
- Time zone: UTC+8 (China Standard)
- Postal code: 325000
- Area code: 0577
- ISO 3166 code: CN-ZJ-03
- License Plate: 浙C
- Spoken language: Wenzhounese
- Website: www.wenzhou.gov.cn

Wenzhou, (Note: pronounced [wə́n.ʈʂóʊ]; Wenzhounese: Yuziou [ʔy^{33–11} tɕiɤu^{33–32}], simplified Chinese: 温州; traditional Chinese: 溫州; pinyin: Wēnzhōu; historically known as Wenchow) formerly known as Yongjia, (Note: Chinese: 永嘉; pinyin: Yǒngjiā; Wade–Giles: Yungchia; lit. 'Forever good'; historically known as Yungkia.) is a prefecture-level city in Zhejiang, China. Situated on the southeastern coast of China, the city sits at the lower reaches and estuary of the Ou River, bordered by the Zhejiang–Fujian Hills to the west and the East China Sea to the east. It governs four districts, three county-level cities and five counties, with the municipal office in Lucheng. Recognised both as one of the 27 core cities of the Yangtze River Delta Economic Zone and one of the five central cities of the Western Taiwan Straits Economic Zone, the city serves as the only junction between the two economic zones.

Archaeological evidence shows that human activity in the area dates back at least 5,000 years. The Ou people, also known as the Ouyue and part of the wider Yue people, established the polity of Dong'ou by at least the fourth century BC and voluntarily surrendered to the Han dynasty of China in 138 BC. The area was successively organised under different administrative names and ranks, including Yongning County from 138, Yongjia Commandery from 323, and Wenzhou Prefecture from 675, later being promoted to Rui'an Fu in 1265 and renamed Wenzhou Circuit in 1276. In the Ming and Qing periods, it was known as Wenzhou Fu, and in 1914 it was designated Ouhai Circuit. Despite repeated changes in administrative status and territorial extent, the seat of Wenzhou prefecture and Yongjia county has remained within the walled city first established in the 4th century, until 1958 when the county seat of Yongjia moved away.

A birthplace of China's private economy, the city was among the first in the country to experiment with market-oriented reforms after 1978, prompting extensive debate over what became known as the "Wenzhou Model" of development. This model is often linked to the city's long-standing commercial culture and its history as a trading hub. Historically a major seaport in southeastern China, Wenzhou was authorised as a foreign trade port during the Song (960–1279) and Yuan (1271–1368) periods, was designated as a treaty port following the 1876 Chefoo Convention, and in 1984 was designated as one of China's first 14 open coastal cities. Wenzhou has been renowned for its developed handicraft industries, and is recognised as one of the places of origin of Chinese celadon. Noted during the Southern Song (1127–1279) for the Yongjia School, the city has long been associated with a pragmatic tradition and a strong pro-business culture.

The city is also known for its religious tradition and widespread overseas communities. Since the 1990s, large numbers of Wenzhou people have migrated to other parts of China and overseas, making Wenzhou a major hometown of overseas Chinese. By 2025, more than two million people of Wenzhou origin were living worldwide, including over 800,000 overseas Chinese across more than 100 countries, forming over 200 Wenzhou chambers of commerce and more than 300 overseas associations, together constituting a vast business network. With the highest proportion of religious believers among Chinese cities and Buddhism as the predominant religion, the city has also been referred to as "China's Jerusalem", as it has more Christians than any other Chinese city.

== Etymology and terminology ==
Wenzhou
- "Wenzhou" in Simplified (top) and Traditional (bottom) Chinese characters
- Simplified Chinese: 温州
- Traditional Chinese: 溫州
- Wu: u^{1}-jo^{1} (Wenzhounese); Uen^{1}tseu^{1} (Shanghainese)
- Postal: Wenchow
- Literal meaning: "Warm Prefecture"
Transcriptions
Standard Mandarin
- Hanyu Pinyin: Wēnzhōu
- Bopomofo: ㄨㄣ ㄓㄡ
- Gwoyeu Romatzyh: Uenjou
- Wade–Giles: Wen^{1}-chou^{1}
- Tongyong Pinyin: Wunjhou
- Yale Romanization: Wēnjōu
- MPS2: Wēnjōu
- IPA: [wə́n.ʈʂóʊ]
Wu
- Romanization: u^{1}-jo^{1} (Wenzhounese); Uen^{1}tseu^{1} (Shanghainese)
Hakka
- Romanization: Vûn-chû
Yue: Cantonese
- Yale Romanization: Wān-jāu
- Jyutping: Wan^{1}-zau^{1}
- IPA: [wɐn˥.tsɐw˥]
Southern Min
- Hokkien POJ: Un-chiu
- Tâi-lô: Un-tsiu
- Bbánlám Pìngyīm: Ūnziū

Wenzhou was originally inhabited by the Ou people, also known as the Ouyue, who formed part of the wider Yue people. The Ou established their capital at Dong'ou, and the region was therefore also known as Ou or Dong'ou. The earliest textual reference appears in the Classic of Mountains and Seas, which describes the area as "Ou dwells in the midst of the sea".

In 323, the Jin dynasty established Yongjia Commandery, with its territory covered both banks of the Ou River, and the name "Yongjia" was taken to mean "long and beautiful waters". The old city was designed by the Jin dynasty scholar Guo Pu in accordance with feng shui principles. Observing that the surrounding mountains resembled the Northern Dipper, Guo based the city's layout on this configuration, giving rise to the alternative name Doucheng, or the "Dipper City". According to local legend, when the city was founded a white deer carrying flowers appeared, hence the names Lucheng or the "Deer City".

In 675, the Tang dynasty established Wen Zhou, or Wenzhou Prefecture. Its name, literally meaning "the warm prefecture", derived from the area's location west of Wenqiao Ridge, where slash-and-burn agriculture was widely practised and the land remained comparatively warm in winter, with severe cold being rare.

The prefectural seat of Wenzhou and the county seat of Yongjia were in the same walled city from 675 to 1958, making the two names often interchangeable in the history. In some early European sources, the city's name was transcribed as Ouen-tcheou-fou (Wenzhou Fu) or Wen-tcheou (Wenzhou). The postal romanisation of Wenzhou and Yongjia is Wenchow and Yungkia respectively, which were widely used until Pinyin was popularised in the 1980s.

== History ==
=== The Ou people ===
The Caowan Mountain site, excavated in 2002, shows that human activity in Wenzhou can be traced back to the Neolithic period around 5,000 years ago. Prehistoric communities survived in an environment shaped by repeated cycles of marine transgression and regression and by the interweaving of mountains and sea. Frequent migration gave rise to settlement patterns characterised by fishing and hunting, gathering, and supplementary early agriculture. The co-existence of dolmen-tomb sites, hanging-coffin burial sites, and earthen-mound tomb sites indicates that different ancient cultures interacted and influenced one another locally. This process formed a Neolithic cultural complex represented by the Haochuan culture and ultimately gave rise to the Ou people, or the Ouyue.

As documented in the Lost Book of Zhou, by no later than the Western Zhou (c. 1046–771 BC), the Ou people had developed tribal leaders and were already paying tribute to the Zhou dynasty of China. Strategies of the Warring States mentions that “those who wear their hair loose, tattoo their bodies, cross their arms, and fasten their garments to the left are the people of Ouyue”.

==== Kingdom of Dong'ou ====
The Ou people were originally part of the state of Yue. After Chu conquered Yue, Yue aristocrats crossed the Qiantang River and moved south, establishing new polities; however, the precise date of Chu’s conquest is disputed, with estimates centring on either 333 BC or around 306 BC. Dong’ou was among the kingdoms founded by descendants of King Goujian of Yue. From the reign after King Wujiang to that of the last king of Dong’ou, Anzhu, the deeds of the Dong’ou kings are largely unrecorded. In 222 BC, Dong’ou was abolished by the Qin dynasty who conquered the Yue people. The Dong’ou king was demoted to a local chieftain under Minzhong Commandery.

In 209 BC, Xiang Yu rose in rebellion against the Qin, and was joined by the Dong’ou chieftain Yao, or Zou Yao, where Zou means chieftain. After the Qin dynasty was defeated, the uprising evolved into a contest between Xiang Yu and Liu Bang. Yao led his Dong’ou troops to defect to Liu Bang, resentful that Xiang Yu had not granted him a kingship. In 201 BC, Liu Bang enfeoffed Yao as Marquis of Haiyang Qixin; in 192 BC, Emperor Hui of Han posthumously elevated him to King of Donghai, recognising Dong’ou as a vassal kingdom under the Han empire.

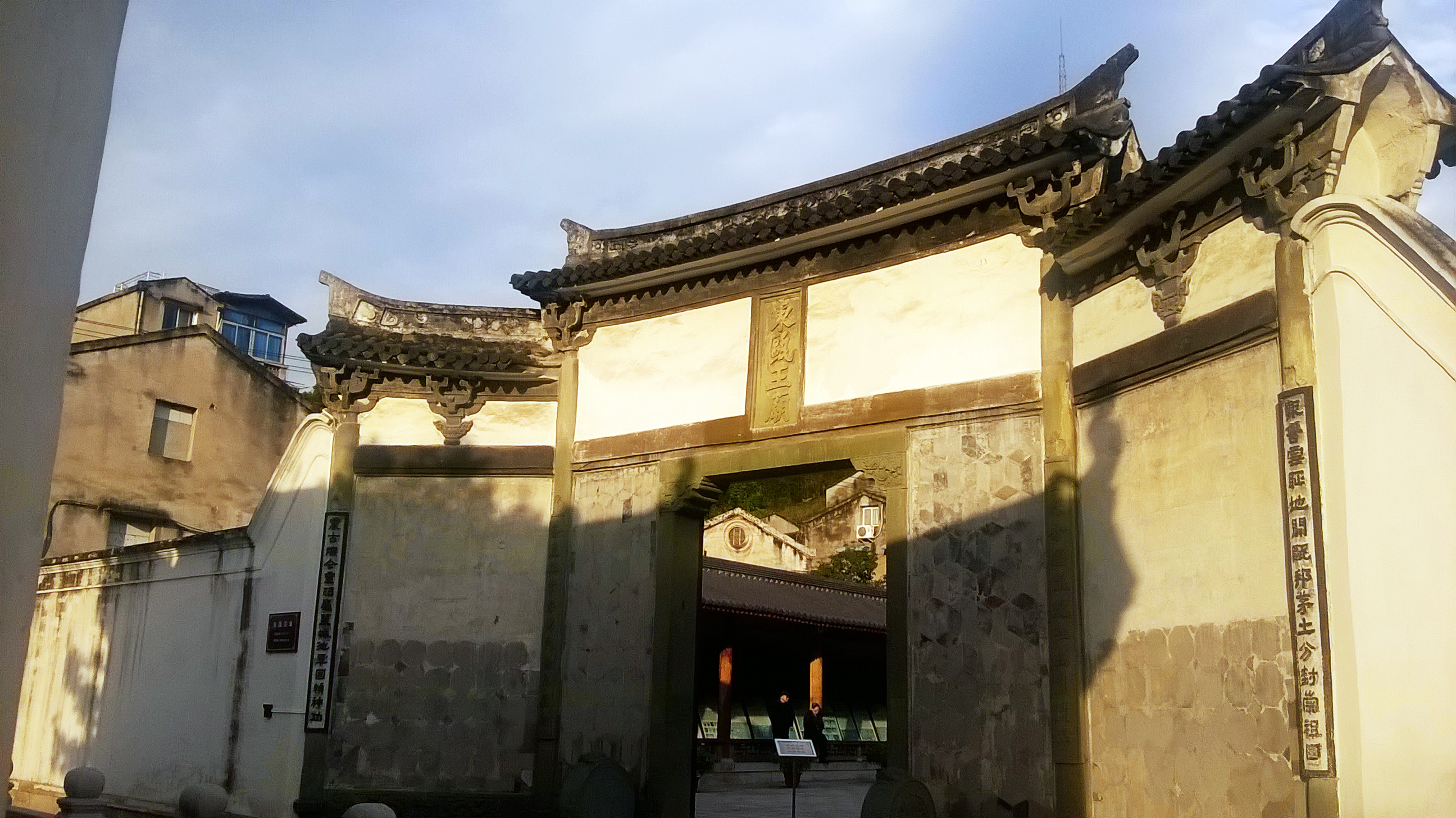
Memorial Temple of Yao, King of Dong'ou

In 154 BC, at the persuasion of a Han envoy, the people of Dong’ou killed Liu Pi, who had fled to Dong’ou after his defeat in the Rebellion of the Seven States. Liu Pi’s sons escaped to Minyue and urged Minyue to attack Ouyue. In 138 BC, Minyue besieged Ouyue, prompting Ouyue to seek assistance from Han. Emperor Wu dispatched forces by sea to rescue Dong’ou. Soon afterwards, the Han court permitted the people of Dong’ou to relocate inland to Lujiang Commandery in Jianghuai, and the king of Donghai surrendered his royal title. From then, the kingdom of Dong’ou ceased to exist.

=== Sinicisation ===
==== Pacifying Shanyue ====
In 111 BC, the Han dynasty conquered Minyue and relocated its population inland in its entirety, leaving much of southern Zhejiang almost uninhabited. A small number of Yue people who refused to migrate, together with Han Chinese who fled into the mountains to evade conscription and taxation, gradually formed the group known as the Shanyue, or the Mountain Yue. In 85, the Han government established Dongye and Huipu counties to administer Yue people who had re-emerged from the mountain. In 87, Huipu County was renamed Zhang’an County. In 138, Yongning County was created from the Dong’ou Township of Zhang’an. The county seat was located on the northern bank of the Ou River, marking the first county-level administration in Wenzhou.

Following his conquests in Jiangdong in 199, Sun Ce founded the Wu regime, which launched continuous military campaigns against the Shanyue until 237, when resistance was largely suppressed. To consolidate control south of the Ou River, the Wu regime established Luoyang County from Yongning County in 239. In Luoyang, the government set up the Hengyu naval garrison as a penal colony. In 257, the Wu regime reorganised the Eastern Commandantcy of Kuaiji into Linhai Commandery; Yongning became one of its subordinate counties, and Luoyang was renamed Anyang. In 280, after Jin conquered Wu, Anyang was renamed Angu, Hengyang County was created, and Yongning, Zhang’an, Angu, and Hengyang were all placed under Linhai Commandery.

==== In-migration ====
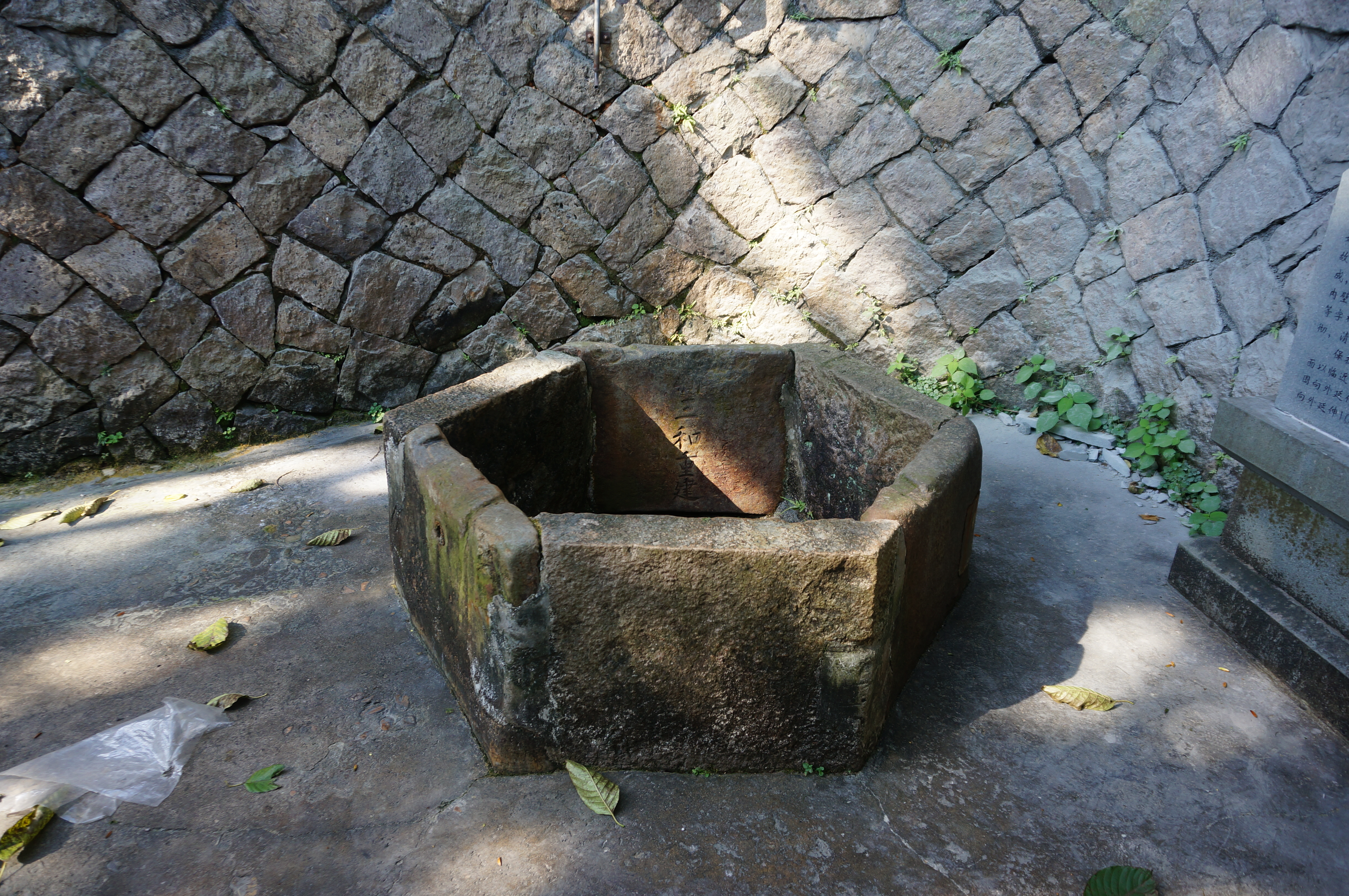
White Deer Nunnery Well created during the creation of Wenzhou's walled city in 323

In 323, the Jin dynasty carved out Yongjia Commandery from five counties (Yongning, Angu, Hengyang, Songyang, and Luojiang of Jin’an) located south of Wenqiao Mountain in Linhai. The new commandery was placed under Yangzhou, with Yongning designated as the commandery seat, marking the first prefectural administration in Wenzhou.

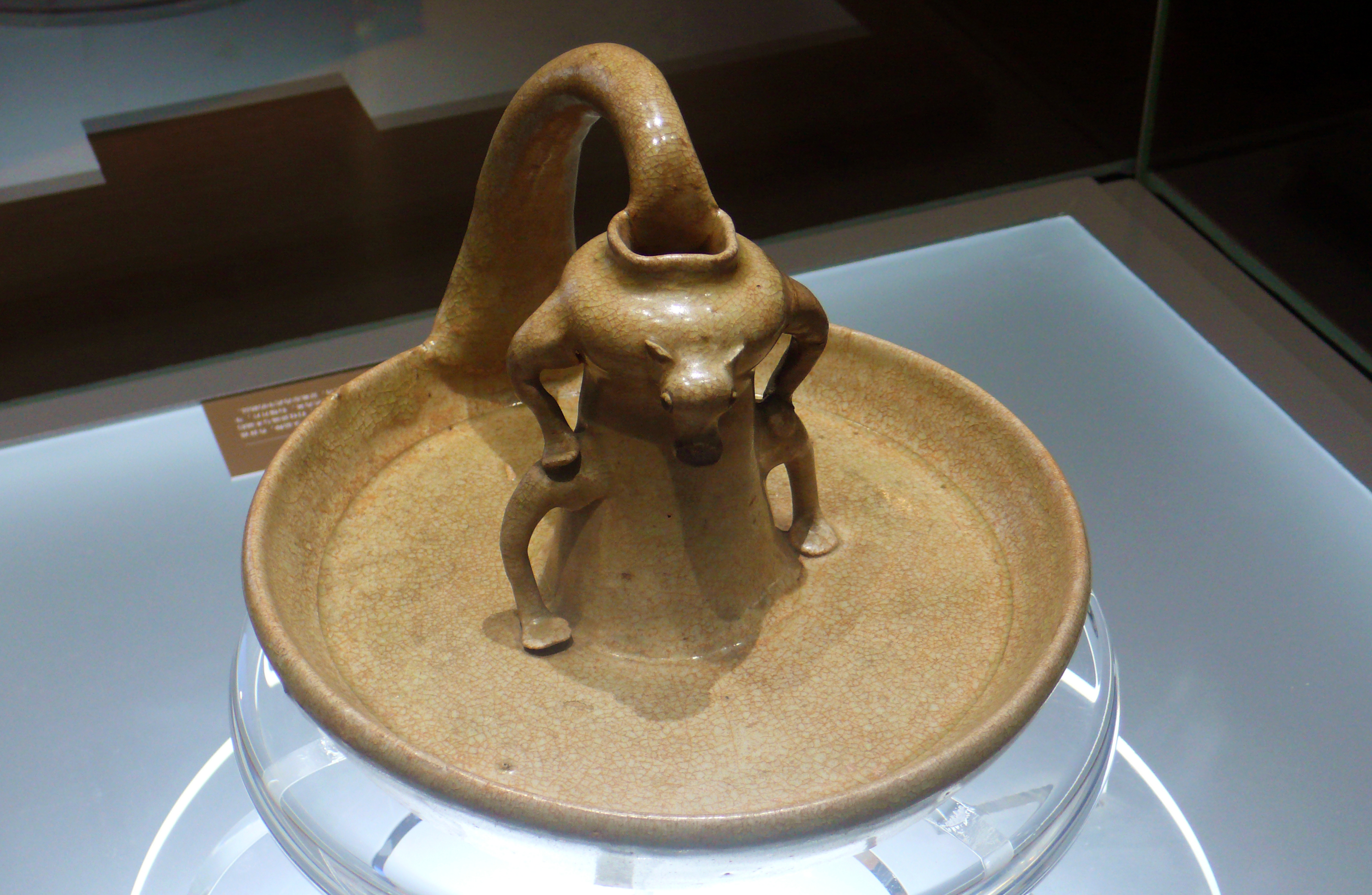
An Ou ware celadon ox-shaped lamp dating to the Eastern Jin period (317–420)

Ongoing warfare in northern China in the 4th century prompted large-scale southward migration of officials and commoners alike. This influx accelerated local economic development in Wenzhou, expanded the cultivation of coastal plains, and gradually replaced traditional fishing and hunting with settled agriculture. Northern literati active in Wenzhou fostered the development of landscape poetry, further enhancing the national reputation of Wenzhou’s natural scenery. Ou ware celadon gained renown across the empire and for a time exerted greater influence than Yue wares.

Nevertheless, tensions between northern aristocratic families and the local population escalated into the rebellions of Sun En and Lu Xun (399–411). The tensions between aristocratic families and lower-status families accumulated and escalated in the next two centuries. From the late Jin period to the early Tang, the region endured successive upheavals and warfare, including the rebellion of Hou Jing (548–552), the separatist regime of Liu Yi (556-562), the revolt of Zhang Dabao (585), leading to severe population decline.

=== Trading port ===
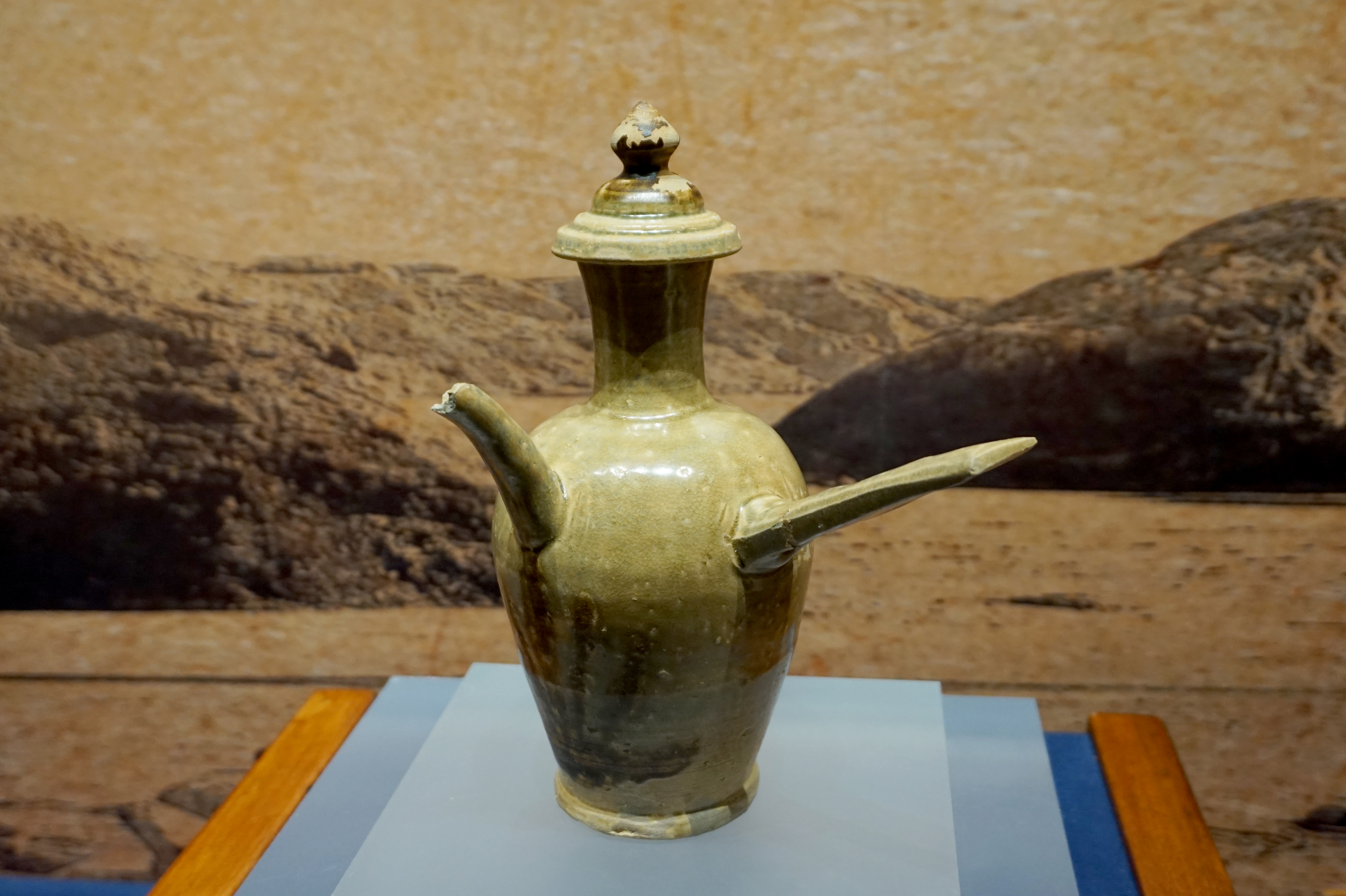
Ou ware celadon created during the Tang dynasty

The chaos and turmoils eventually enabled the Sui dynasty from northern China to conquer the south in 589; however, its rule met with widespread resistance and revolts in areas including Wenzhou, largely provoked by unpopular policies of forced cultural assimilation. After a series of administrative changes between 621 and 627, following the Tang dynasty’s takeover, Yongjia Commandery was dissolved, leaving Yongjia County as its sole remaining administrative unit. Still, Yongjia emerged as a major trading port, of which marine trade with Japan started in 659.

In 675, a resident of Yongjia named Li Xingfu petitioned the imperial court for the establishment of a prefecture. The court approved the creation of Wen Zhou, or Wenzhou Prefecture, from Yongjia and Angu counties. In 689, Yuecheng county was established from Yongjia county. In 701, Hengyang county was established from Angu county. In 742, Wen Zhou was renamed Yongjia Commandery. In 758, Yongjia Commandery was reverted to Wen Zhou. A Jinghai Army Commissioner was appointed to govern Wenzhou, with concurrent authority over Tai Zhou and Ming Zhou. The court also established the Yongjia Salt Inspectorate in Wenzhou, one of ten such inspectorates nationwide.

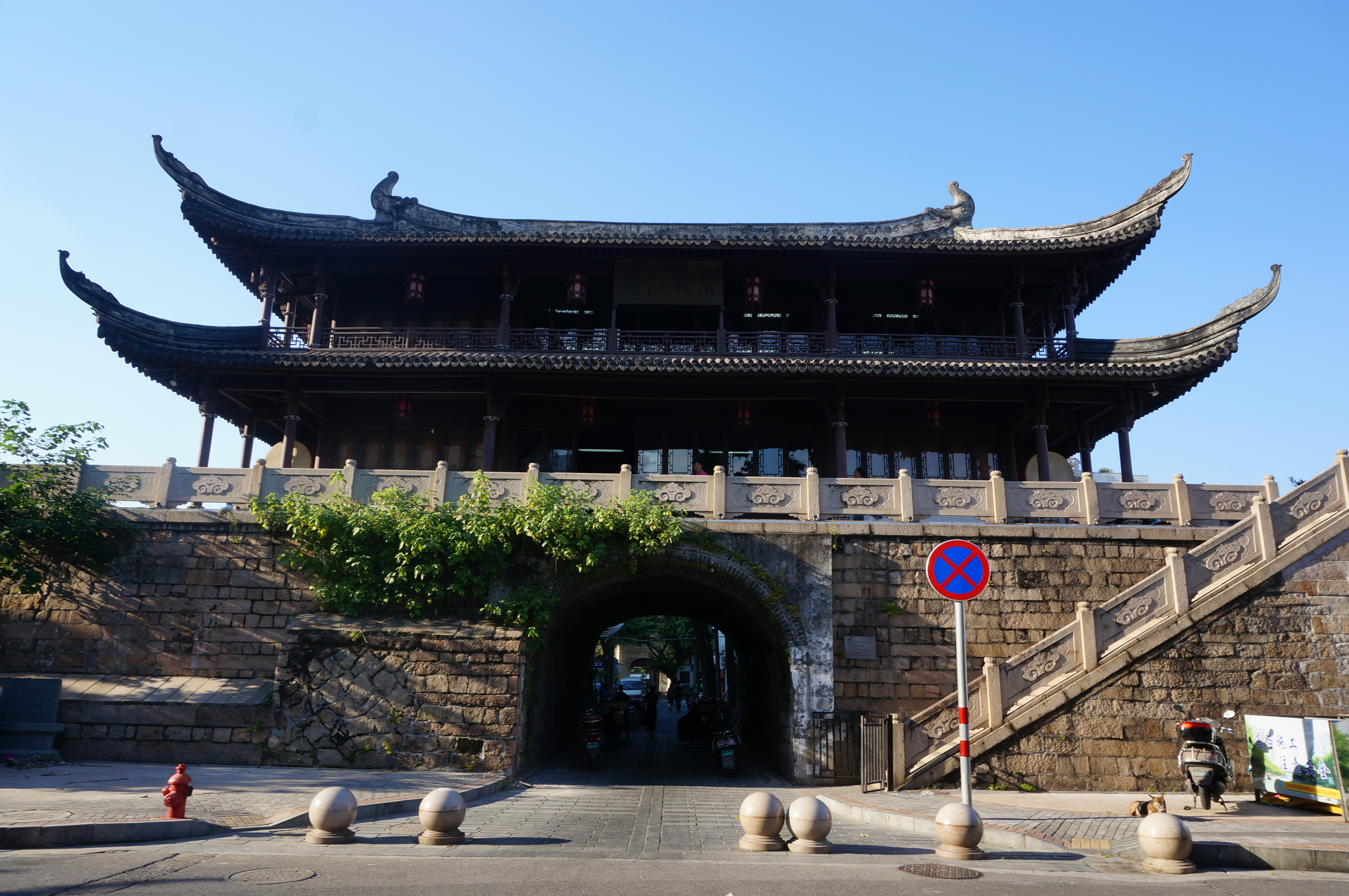
The Wenzhou Drum Tower, originally built during the Wuyue period

As the Tang dynasty fell, regional warlords carved out autonomous domains and waged wars against one another, and Wenzhou experienced repeated military upheavals. As the central government proved unable to exercise effective control over Wenzhou, it instead sought support by conferring formal titles on local powers. Wenzhou eventually fell into the Kingdom of Wuyue (907-978), during which maritime trade flourished, and a maritime trading office was established; exports included ceramics, tea, juan paper, lacquerware, and other goods. Because Fujian were ruled by a rival regime, Wenzhou’s connections with the south and with overseas markets were obstructed; however, it developed direct trading links with northern coastal cities such as Dengzhou and Laizhou.

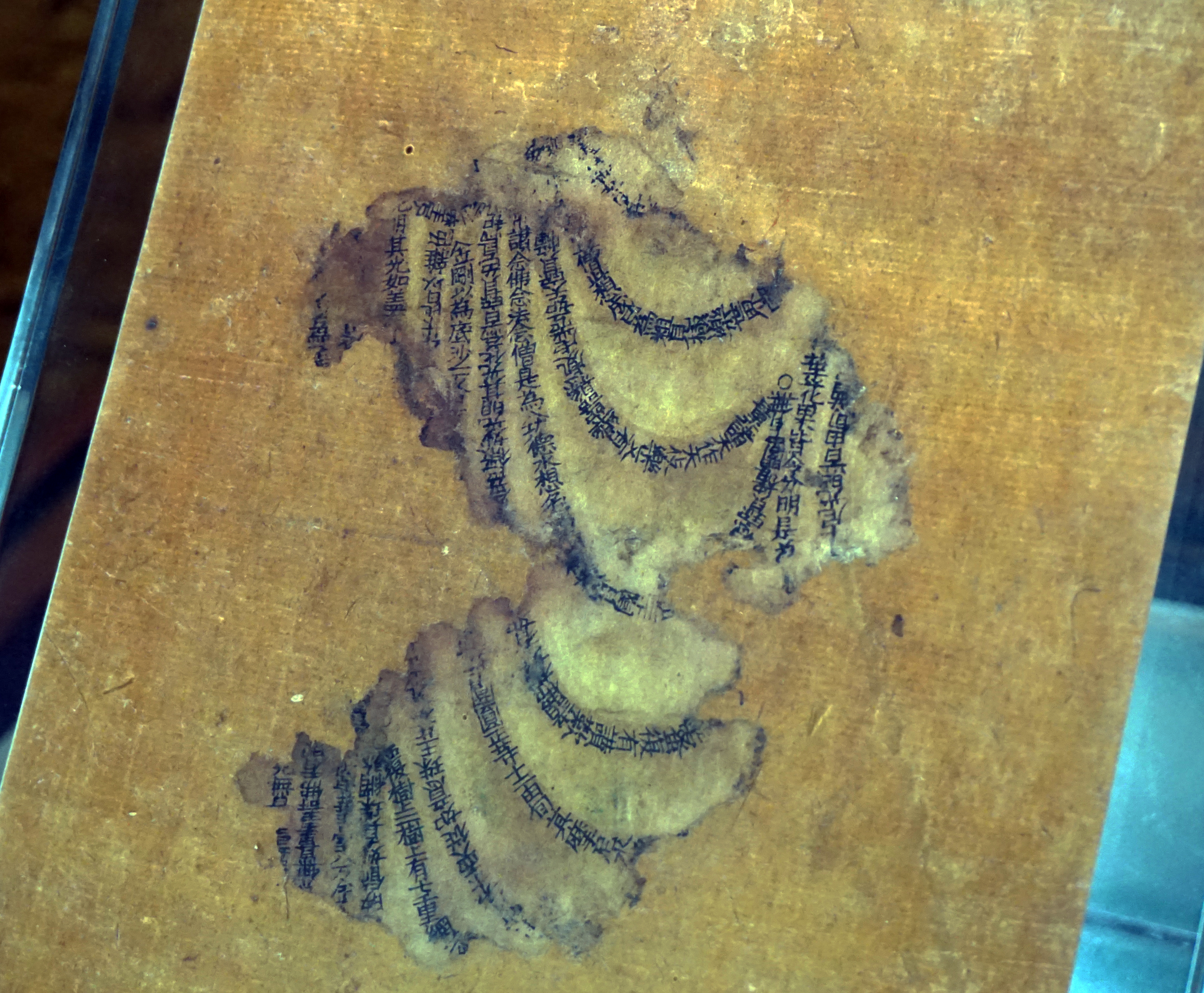
A fragment of the Amitāyus Contemplation Sūtra, printed in 1103 and unearthed in 1965 in Wenzhou, is the earliest surviving example of movable-type printing

In 978, Qian Chu, King of Wuyue, surrendered his territory to the Song dynasty. In 997, Wen Zhou was restored and placed under the Liangzhe Circuit. During the Song dynasty (960-1279), as the economy of southern China expanded rapidly, Wenzhou saw growth in rice cultivation, tea and citrus planting, and salt production. Local manufactures such as juan paper and lacquerware became more refined, entrepôt trade flourished, and Longquan celadon emerged as a major export commodity. In 1090, a shipyard was established near the Guogong Hill, with annual output reaching 600 vessels, the highest in the country. In 1117, because the Wenzhou-born Daoist priest Lin Lingsu was held in high regard at the court of Emperor Huizong, Wenzhou was elevated to the status of a regional military command.

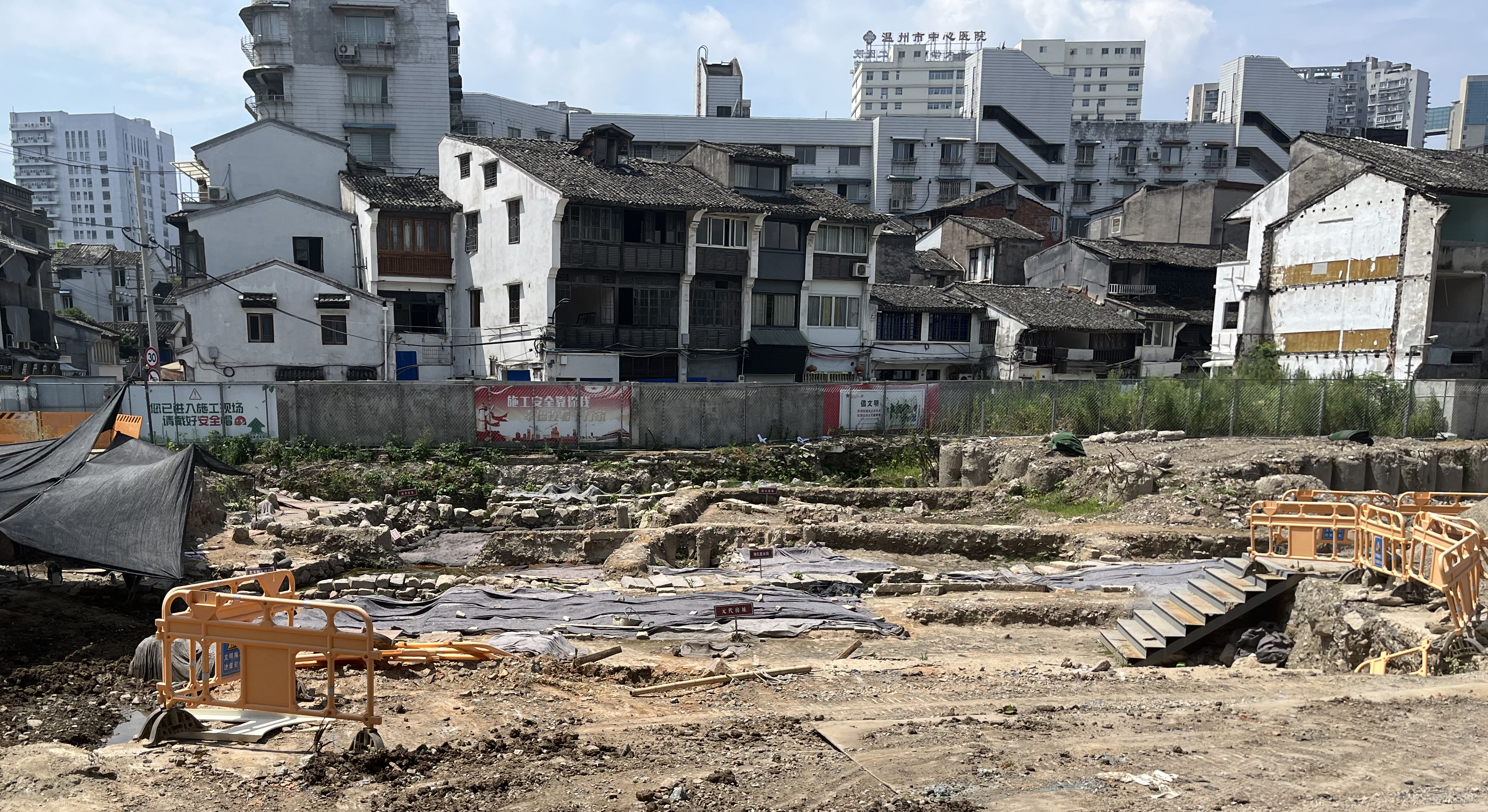
Archaeological excavations at Shuomen Port Site, by far the largest and most complete port site from the Song and Yuan dynasties discovered

In 1130, amid the Jurchen invasion of China, Emperor Gaozong fled south by boat, calling at Wenzhou and staying at Jiangxin Temple. The upheaval triggered large-scale in-migration, members of the imperial clan, officials, and refugees, while maritime trade became still more buoyant. The civil service examinations flourished locally, with a marked rise in the number of jinshi graduates, enhancing Wenzhou’s reputation for scholars. The Yongjia School, distinguished by its emphasis on practical statecraft, also took shape and for a time was seen as a counterweight to the teachings associated with Zhu Xi and Lu Jiuyuan. In 1166, Wenzhou was struck by a severe flood, resulting in migrants from Fujian. Fujian’s strong scholarly tradition, in turn, further reinforced local enthusiasm for the civil service examinations.

In 1265, Emperor Duzong elevated Wenzhou, his former fief, to the status of Rui’an Prefecture. In 1276, as Mongol-led Yuan dynasty forces closed in on Lin’an, the dynastic capital, the Wenzhou-born chancellor Chen Yizhong fled to his hometown with Prince Yi and Prince Guang; the two were later enthroned in turn as Emperor Duanzong and Emperor Shaodi, the last two emperors of Song. After Rui’an Prefecture capitulated, the Yuan administration reorganised it as the Wenzhou Circuit. Popular support for Chen, however, fuelled continued resistance to Mongol rule, while Wenzhou remained a major port: it was a principal outlet for Longquan celadon and also a key shipbuilding base for the Mongol invasion of Java.

=== Sea bans ===
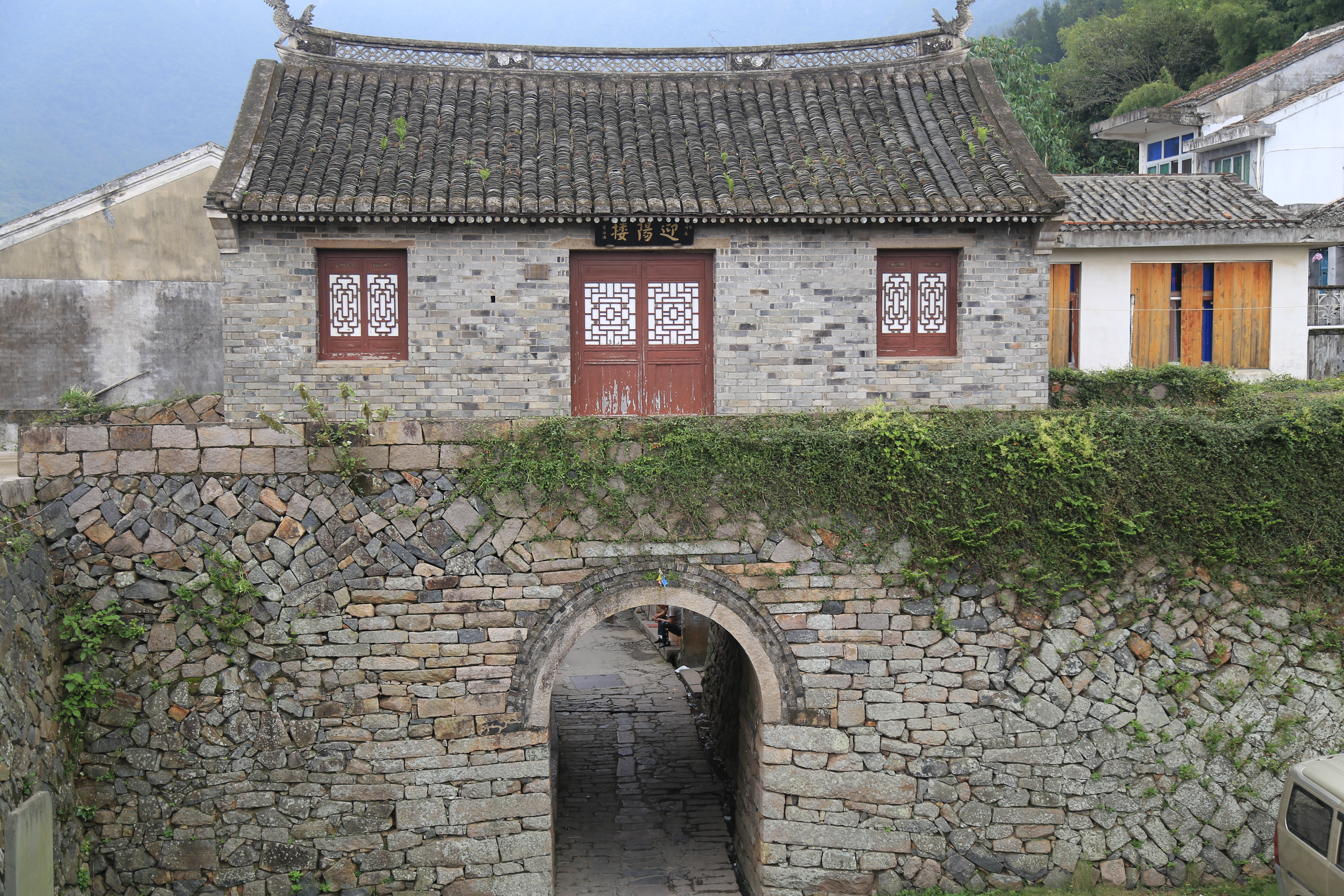
The walled city of Puzhuangsuo created in 1384

In 1367, the Ming dynasty took control of Wenzhou from an anti-Yuan revolt. In 1368, the Wenzhou Circuit was redesignated as Wenzhou Fu. Throughout the Ming period, pirates known as wokou were active off the Wenzhou coast, and in the mid-to-late Ming the threat from wokou raids became particularly pronounced. Raiding vessels could ride the northeasterly winds from Satsuma, Gōtō Islands and Nagasaki to the Zhejiang coast. In response, the Ming court progressively established a tightly organised weisuo garrison system in Wenzhou to strengthen coastal defence.

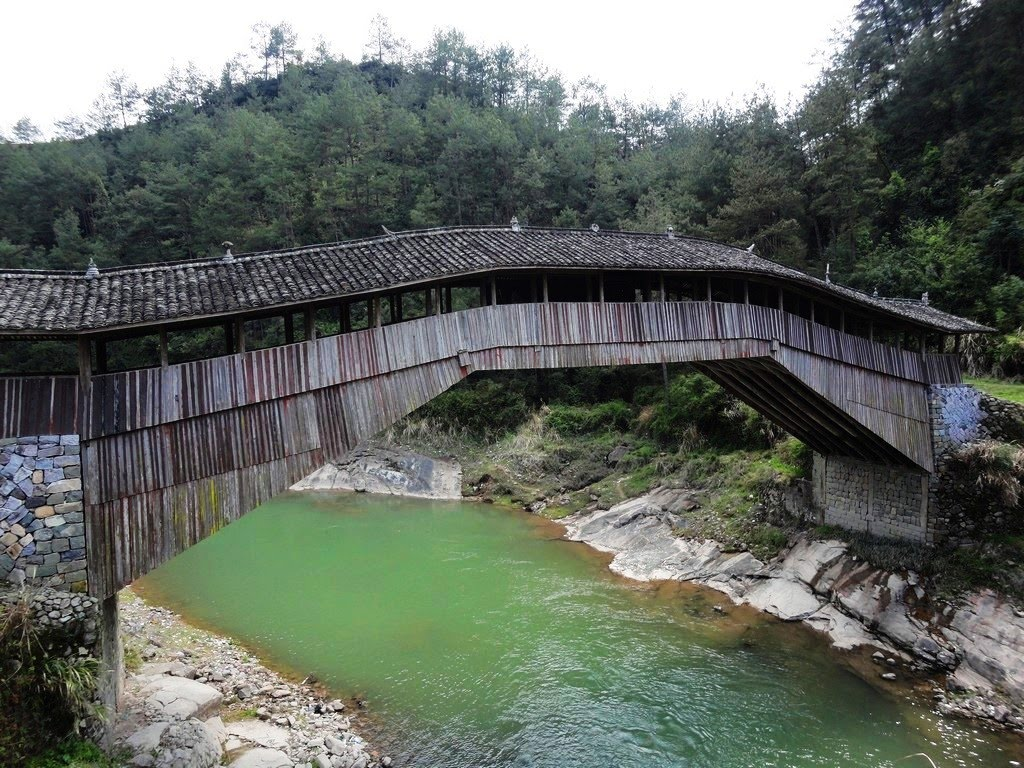
A covered bridge in Taishun, first built in 1453

In 1448, the Deng Maoqi uprising broke out in Shaxian, Fujian; rebel forces later entered Wenzhou territory before being suppressed. In 1452, Taishun County was created from the southwestern border areas of Rui’an and Pingyang as part of the post-rebellion settlement. After these disturbances, powerful clans openly flouted official prohibitions by engaging in smuggling. In 1547, Zhu Wan was appointed Grand Coordinator of Zhejiang. Stationed in Wenzhou, he cracked down on pirates, attacked the Shuangyu port and the Nanji Island; however, he was impeached by influential lineages whose interests depended on illicit maritime trade, and he later committed suicide.

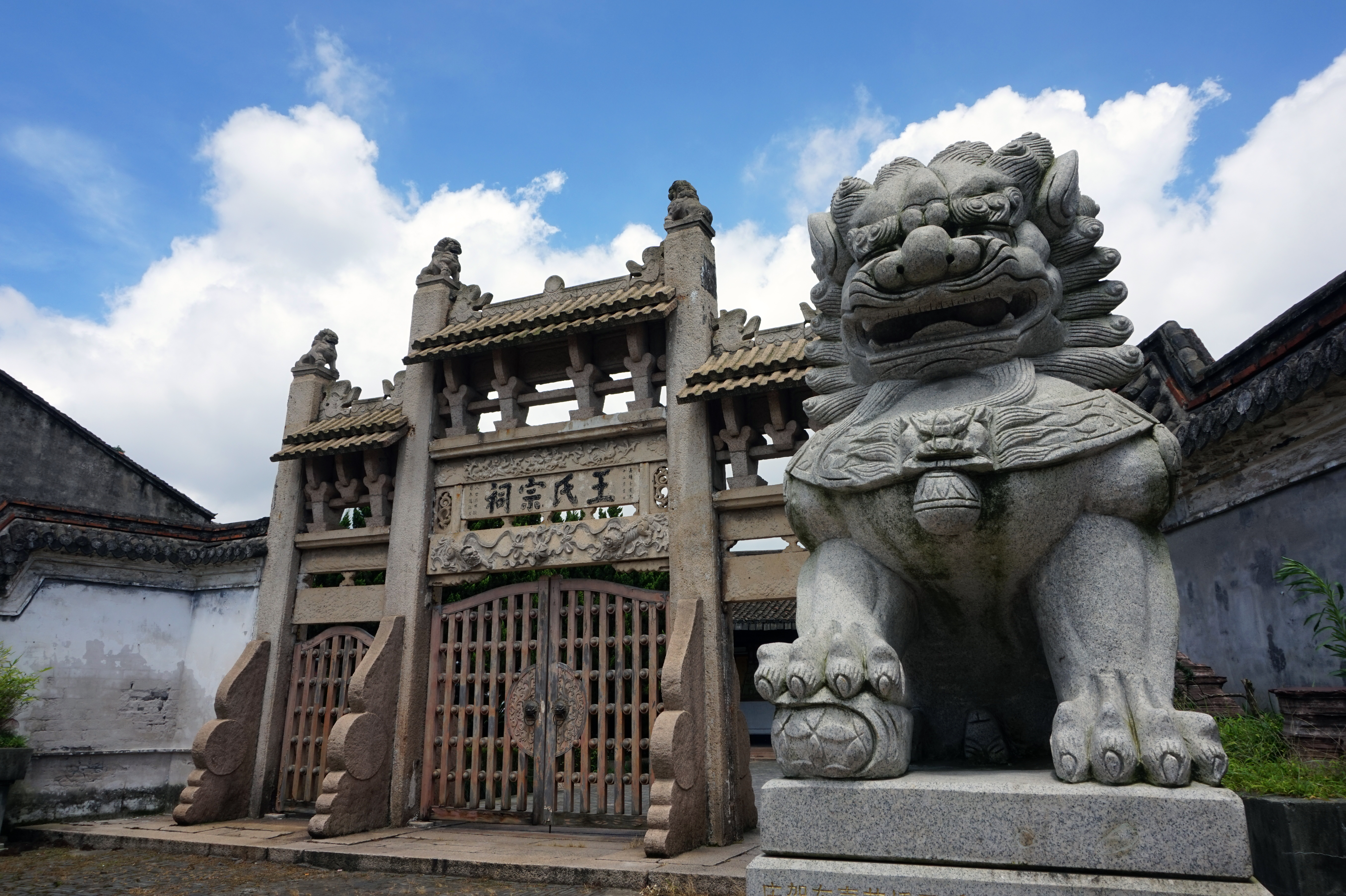
Yongchang Fort created in 1558

In 1552, after his request to lift the maritime ban was rejected, Wang Zhi launched raids along the eastern Zhejiang coast, including Wenzhou. In 1557, Hu Zongxian lured Wang Zhi into captivity; in retaliation, Wang’s loyalists besieged multiple locations around Wenzhou, prompting local communities to build fortified villages such as Yongxing Fort and Yongchang Fort for self-protection. The following year, Qi Jiguang moved south and defeated the wokou, largely stabilising the situation in Wenzhou. As coastal defences were strengthened thereafter, although naval fighting continued, pirates generally failed to land in Wenzhou.

In 1646, the Qing dynasty took the city without resistance. In 1656, the Qing court imposed a sea ban. In 1658, Koxinga landed at Pingyang and attacked Rui’an by land, assaulted Wenzhou by sea, and captured Yueqing; in response, the Qing court stationed the Zhejiang Viceroy in Wenzhou. In 1661, the Qing court enforced coastal evacuations to sanction Koxinga. In 1670, the Wenchu Circuit was established, administering Wenzhou and Chuzhou prefectures under Zhejiang. In 1674, during the Revolt of the Three Feudatories, forces under Geng Jingzhong entered Pingyang; the Wenzhou garrison commander Zu Hongxun rose in support but was defeated and surrendered the following year.

In 1683, following the conquest of Taiwan, the Qing court lifted the sea ban and the coastal evacuation order. In 1685, the Zhejiang Customs was established, with branch ports at Wenzhou, Rui’an, and Pingyang. From the Kangxi period onwards, overseas navigation from Wenzhou Port became increasingly frequent, and most vessels engaged in trade with Japan were built in Wenzhou or Ningbo. In 1757, the Zhejiang Customs was closed, cutting off overseas trade; thereafter, the smuggling of Southeast Asian goods and opium gradually increased.

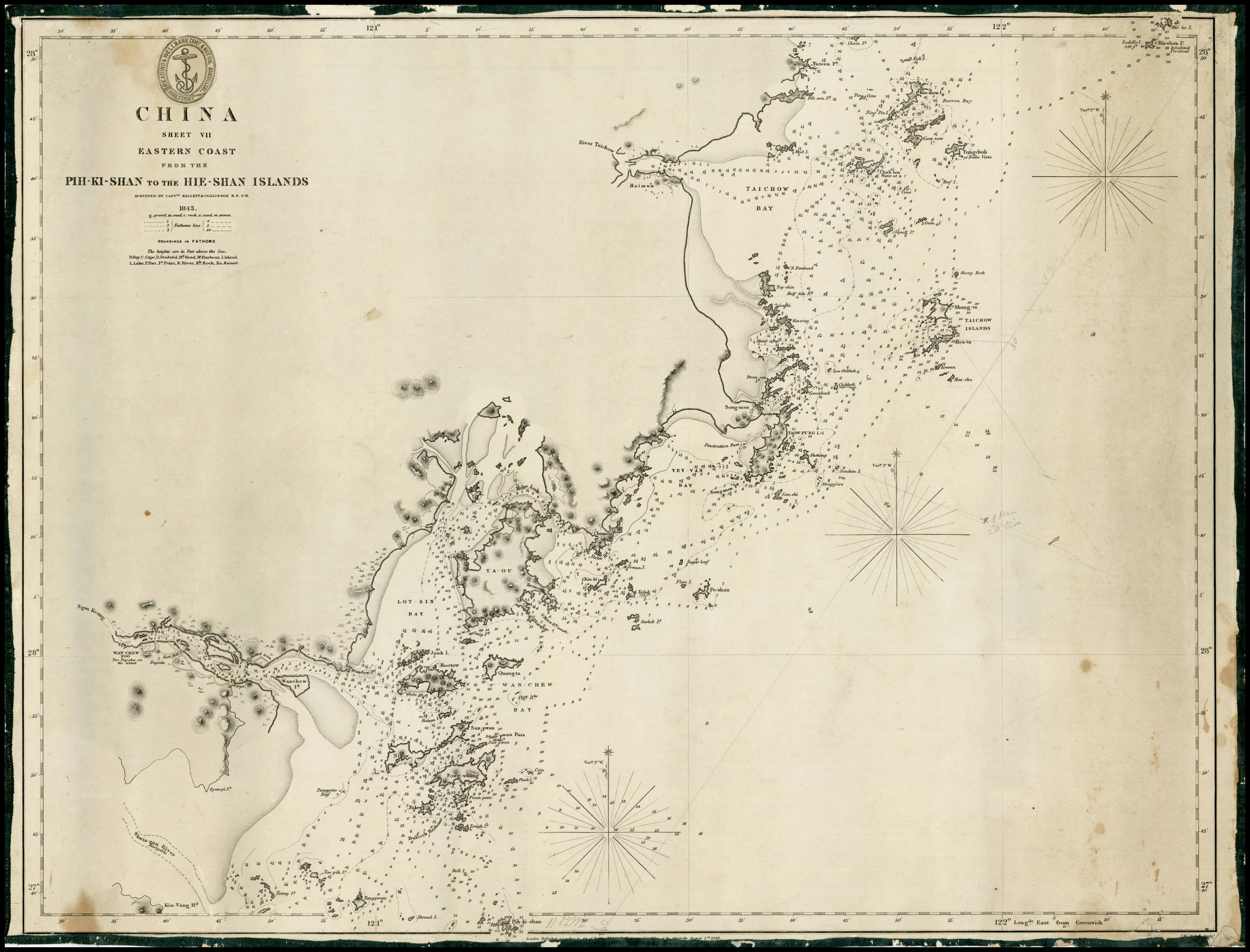
A nautical chart of the Taizhou–Wenzhou coast produced by the British navy and published in 1849

From the 1840s, Wenzhou became increasingly entangled in the crises of the late Qing. During the Opium War, British forces raided Yueqing in 1841 but encountered organised local resistance. Domestic unrest associated with secret societies soon followed: in 1855, the Yueqing native Qu Zhenhan joined the Taiping Heavenly Kingdom and briefly seized the county seat. In 1861, the Jinqian Society uprising spread from Pingyang into Wenzhou itself, but collapsed after internal defections. Around the same time, Christian missions entered the region and were widely suspected of links with secret societies, triggering repeated clashes between local people and missionaries.

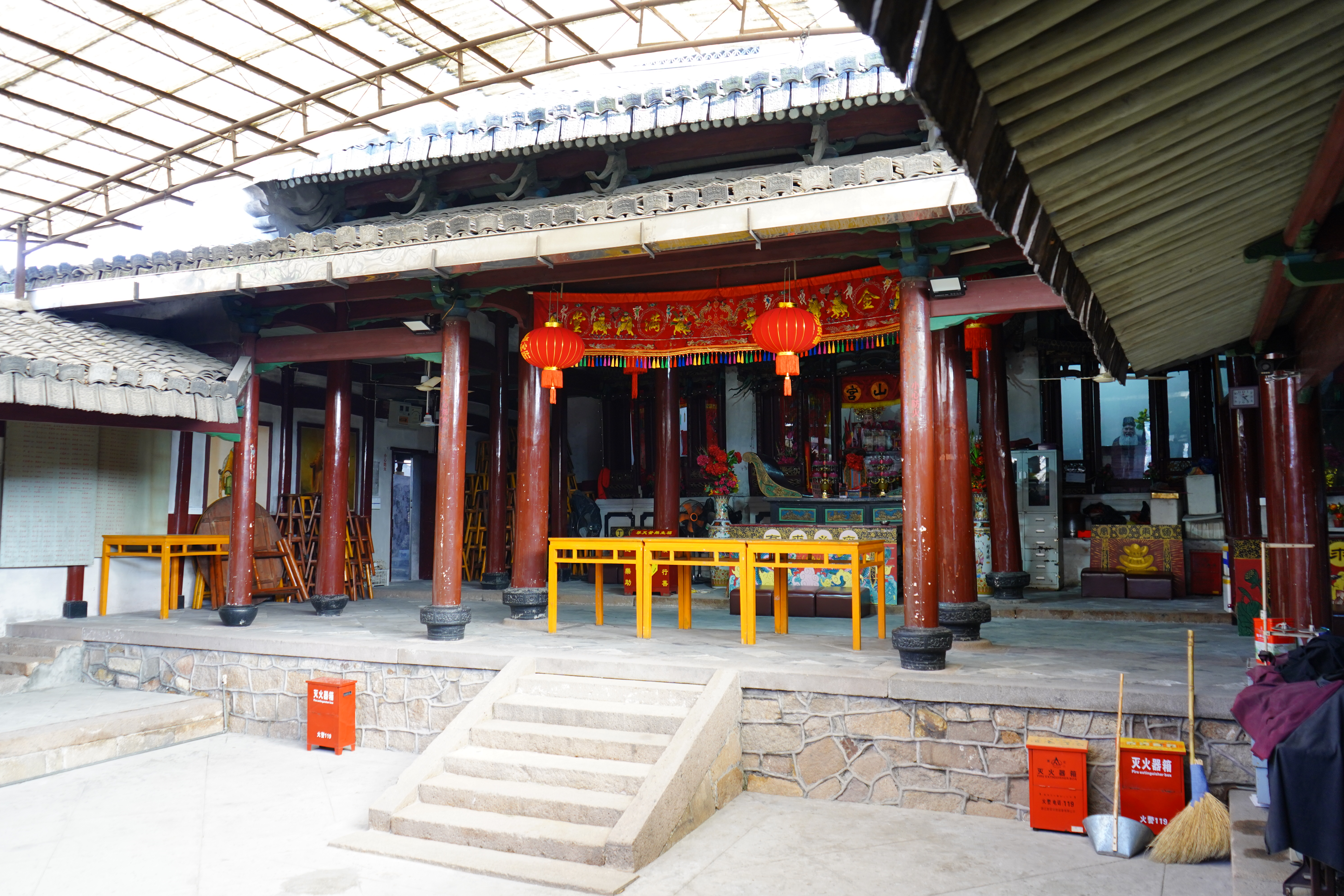
Former Command Headquarters of the Jinqian Society uprising of 1861

=== Treaty port ===
In 1876, Wenzhou was designated as a treaty port under the Chefoo Convention in the wake of the Margary Affair. A customs office was established the following year. While foreign trade was limited, steamship travel then allowed local scholars, among them Chen Qiu, Sun Yiyan, and Sun Yirang, to travel widely and return to establish hospitals, schools, and libraries, helping to introduce new educational and social institutions. Nevertheless, tensions persisted: an anti-missionary riot broke out in 1884, and Boxer-related unrest in Rui’an and Pingyang was suppressed in 1900. Amid these tensions, Britain established a consulate on Jiangxin Islet, just across the Ou River from Wenzhou, in 1894.

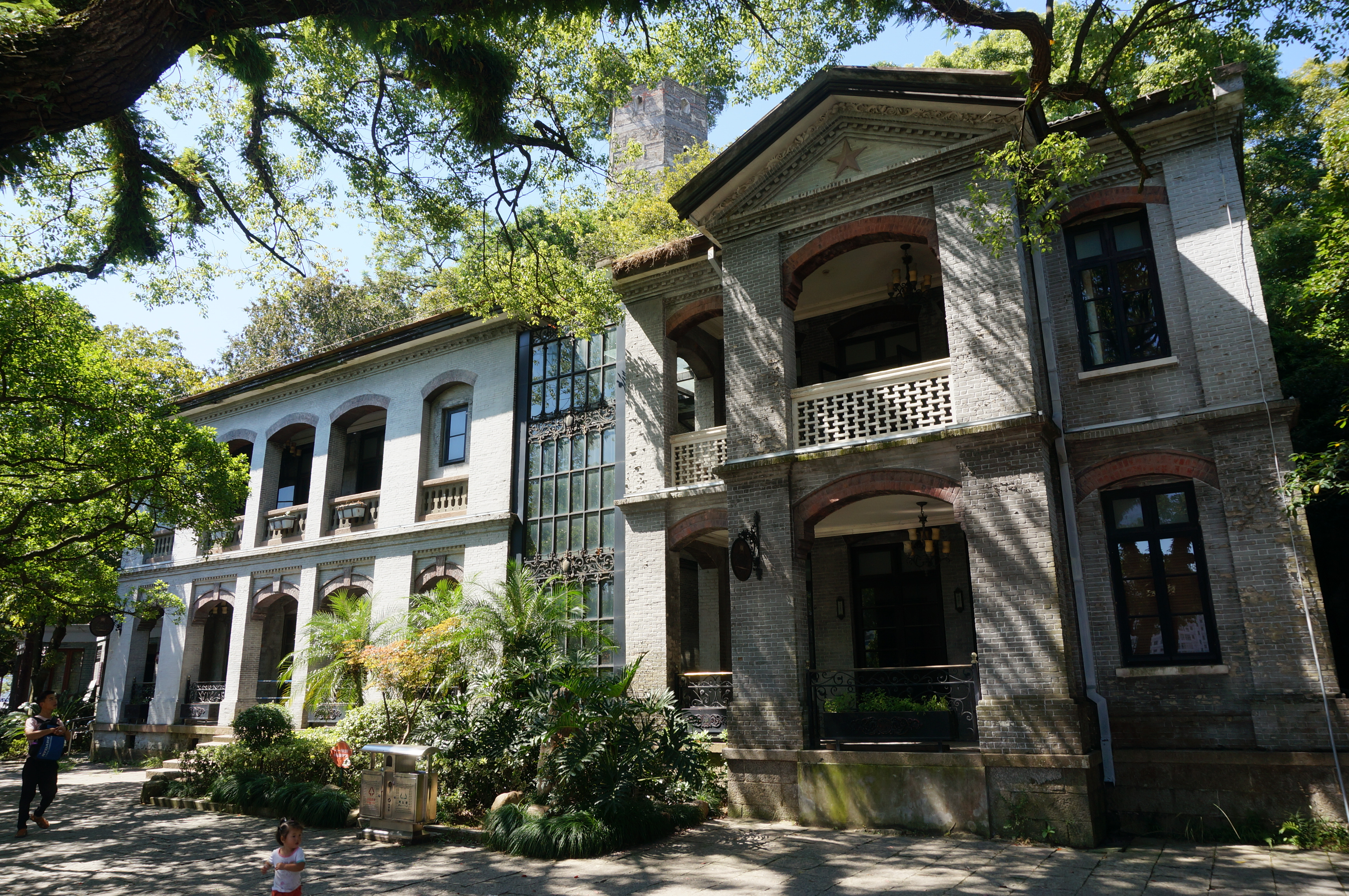
Former British Consulate at Wenzhou, built in 1894

After the Wuchang Uprising in 1911, revolutionary authority spread rapidly across China. On 29 November, Wenzhou established a local military government. In early 1912, the Wenzhou native Chen Fuchen organised a new political party in Wenzhou, which later merged into a nationwide party called Democratic Party. From 1919, overseas migration accelerated: more than 2,000 labourers were recruited from Qingtian to work in Europe during the First World War, many of whom did not return, marking the first large wave of massive Wenzhounese emigration. Soon afterwards, increasing numbers of Wenzhou people emigrated to Japan.

In 1924, the Chinese Communist Party established an independent Wenzhou branch and, during the First United Front, cooperated with the Nationalists to organise women’s, student, labour, and peasant movements locally. During the Northern Expedition in 1926, defeated warlord forces retreated into Wenzhou, bringing widespread disorder; local society openly welcomed the arrival of the National Revolutionary Army. After the breakdown of the First United Front, Communist activists were suppressed. Administrative reforms followed, including the abolition of circuits in 1927 and the establishment of successive regional inspectorates during the 1930s.

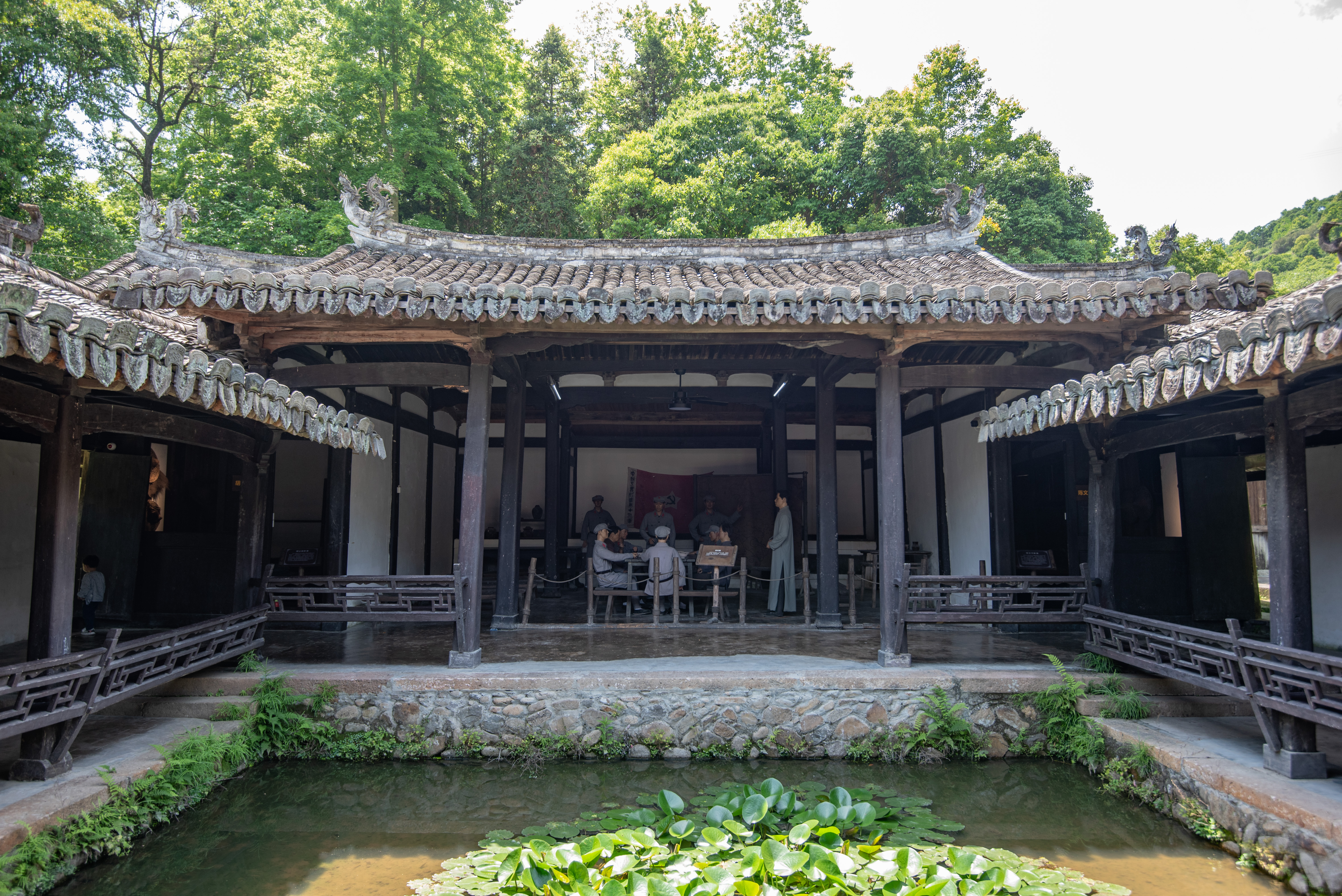
Former headquarters site of the Red Thirteenth Army in Yongjia

Natural disasters in 1929, typhoons, flooding, and pest outbreaks, triggered another surge of overseas migration. Rural unrest spread across southern Zhejiang, and Communist forces organised armed resistance, including the Red Thirteenth Army, which remained active until 1932. Following the failure of the Fifth Encirclement Campaign in 1934, Communist guerrilla activity intensified along the Zhejiang-Fujian border, continuing until the Second United Front was formed in 1937. In 1938, Communist forces in the region were reorganised into the New Fourth Army. After 1937, and especially following the closure of the Burma Road in 1941, Wenzhou’s coastal position made it an important wartime logistics hub. Several universities relocated to the area, including National Yingshi University and the National Peiyang Institute of Technology. Japanese forces occupied Wenzhou on three occasions between 1941 and 1944. Prolonged warfare, combined with severe inflation, left the local economy deeply depressed Student protests and popular resistance were frequent, while overseas migration resumed with support from established diaspora networks.

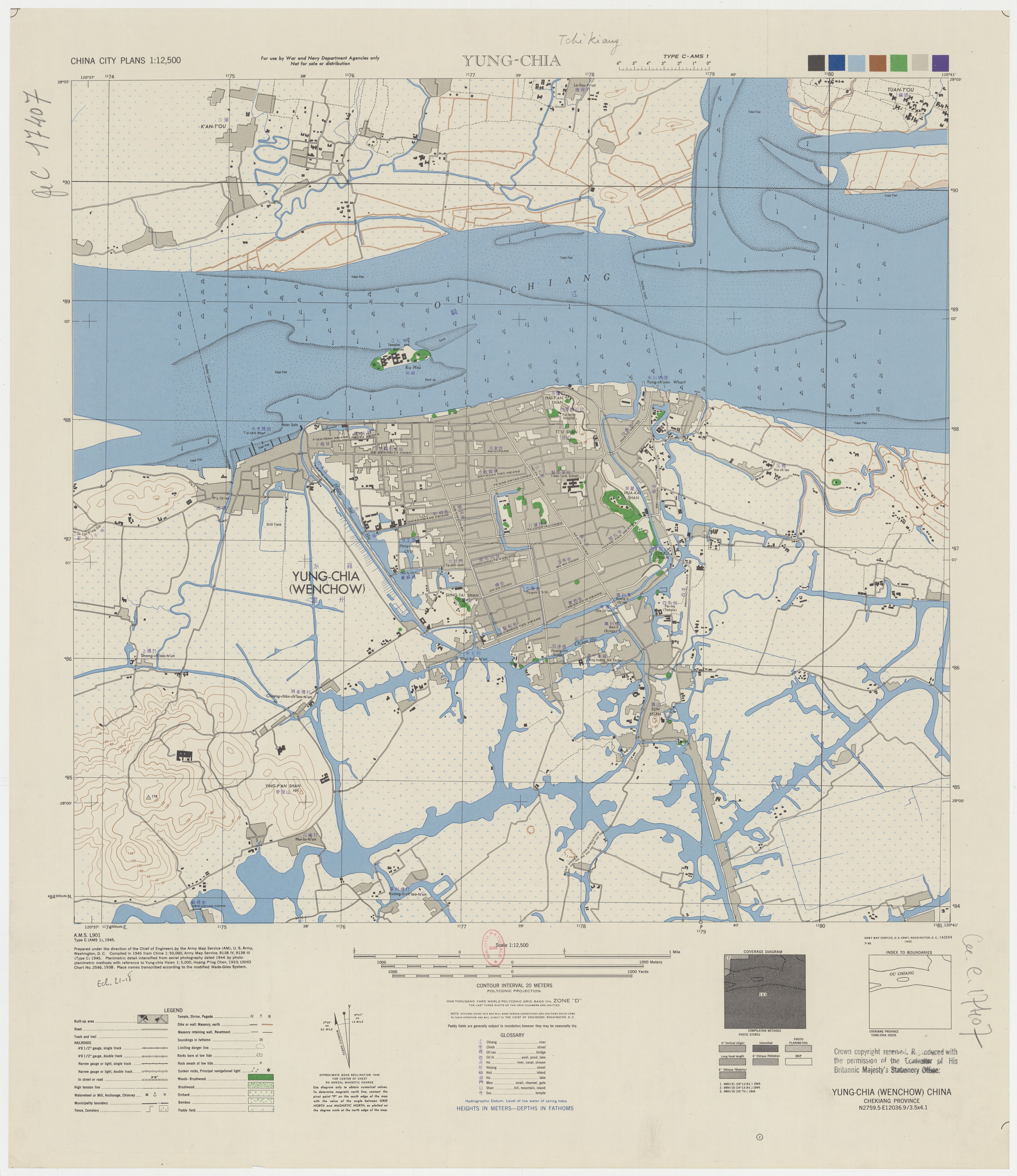
A map of Wenzhou from the U.S. military in 1945

On 7 May 1948, following negotiations between local Nationalist commanders and Communist representatives, Wenzhou was taken by the Communists peacefully. Nationalist forces nevertheless remained active along the coast until the evacuation of the Dachen Islands in 1955.

=== Mao Zedong era ===
After Communist forces entered Wenzhou, a municipal Military Control Commission was established to take over administration. In the early years, the new authorities launched a succession of political campaigns, including the suppression of local strongmen, the campaign to suppress counter-revolutionaries, the banning of groups such as the Legion of Mary and various sectarian organisations, socialist transformation, and patriotic production drives.

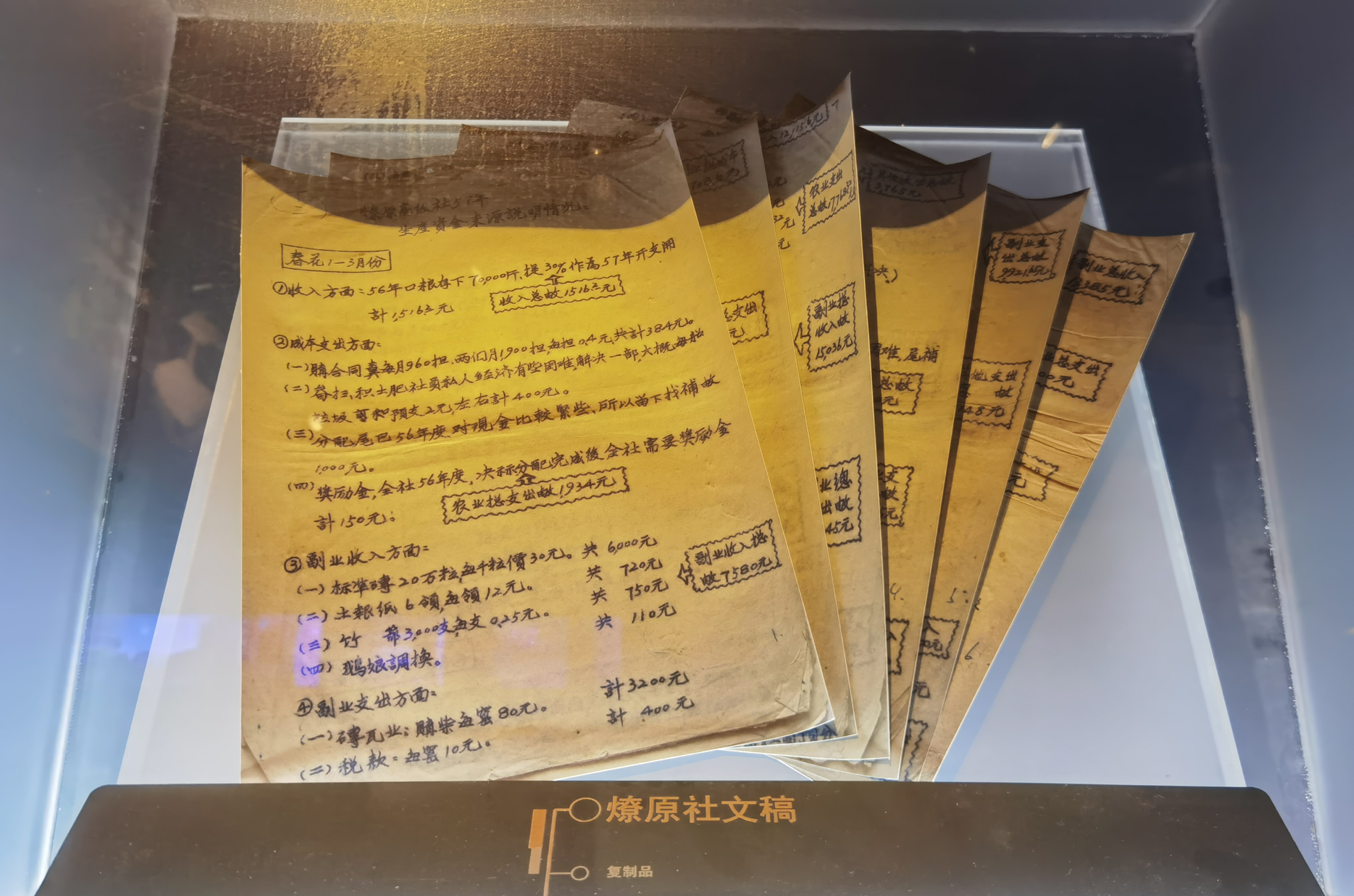
Replica of the household responsibility documents from Liaoyuan Commune (1956), held by the Wenzhou Museum

In May 1956, Yongjia County experimented with the household responsibility in agricultural output, which spread rapidly across Wenzhou. By August 1957, however, the county leadership was instructed to reverse the practice. In 1962, policy adjustment again targeted privately run industry: many locally managed factories were closed, workers were laid off, and the number of such enterprises fell by roughly two thirds.

As a frontline region facing Taiwan, Wenzhou received limited state investment for many years. State-owned industry remained small in scale, and external transport links were poor. Tensions developed between locally rooted cadres, many with guerrilla backgrounds, and officials dispatched from northern China. With limited prospects for promotion and weaker political standing, local cadres sought to protect local interests in order to retain grassroots support. As a result, political campaigns such as collectivisation and the “Learn from Dazhai” movement were often implemented only superficially. After the outbreak of the Cultural Revolution, the Wenzhou Prefectural Commission was attacked, the People’s Liberation Army intervened, and military control was reimposed. Local cadres quietly tolerated the revival and expansion of markets and petty commerce as a means of preserving social support and self-protection.

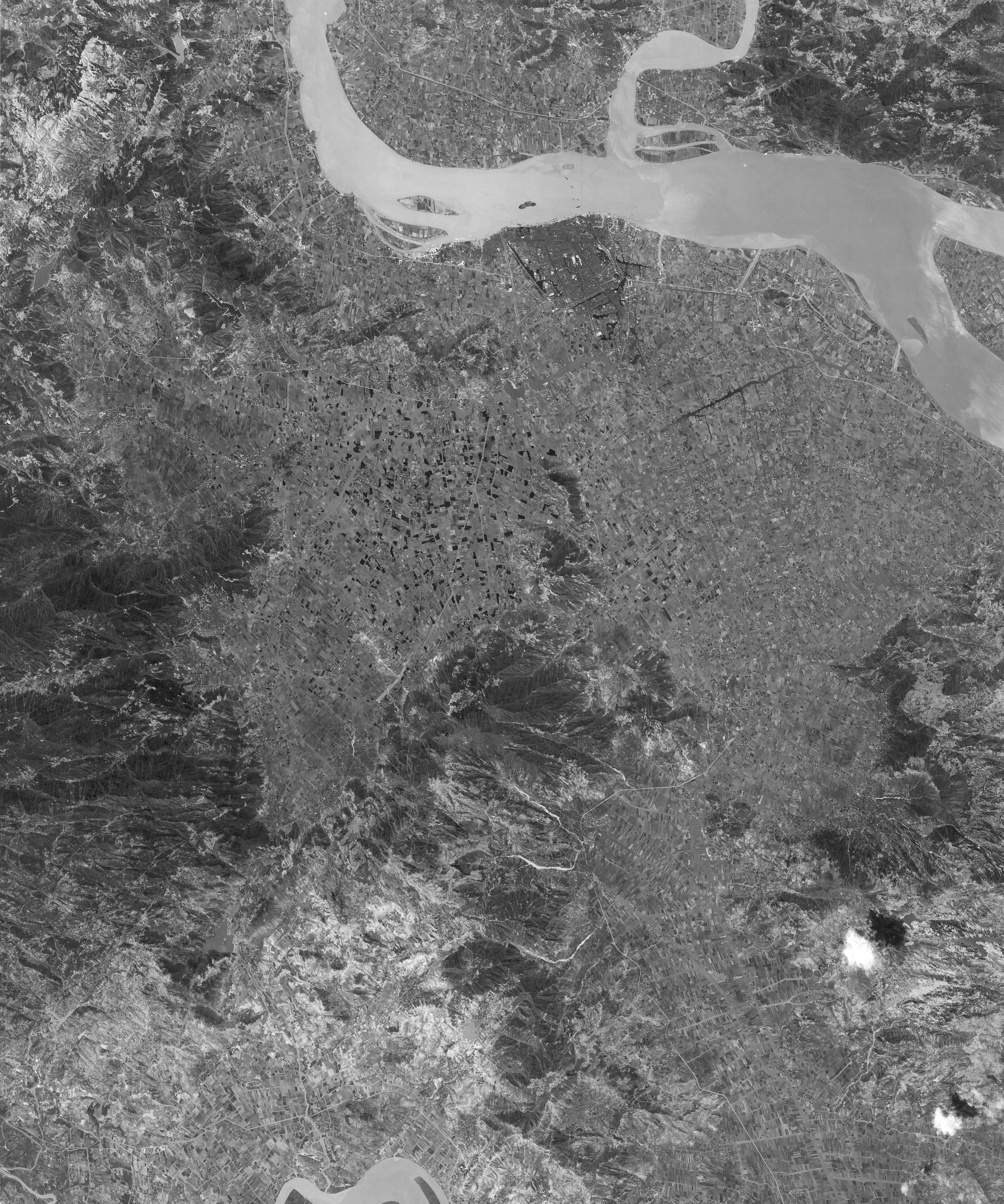
American satellite image of Wenzhou in 1965

During the Cultural Revolution, state-owned and collective enterprises frequently ceased production, unemployment rose, and social order deteriorated amid factional confrontation and armed clashes. Yet household production and informal markets survived in concealed forms, generating private contracting and significant revenues.

=== Economic reforms ===
With the end of the Cultural Revolution in 1976, many locally rooted officials, who had been less affected by the turmoil, were able to return to office relatively quickly. Once reinstated, they consolidated political support by backing local private enterprise. The so-called 10000-yuan households, meaning the household with over 10,000 yuan savings, that had emerged in the 1970s expanded under reform policies into private businesses.

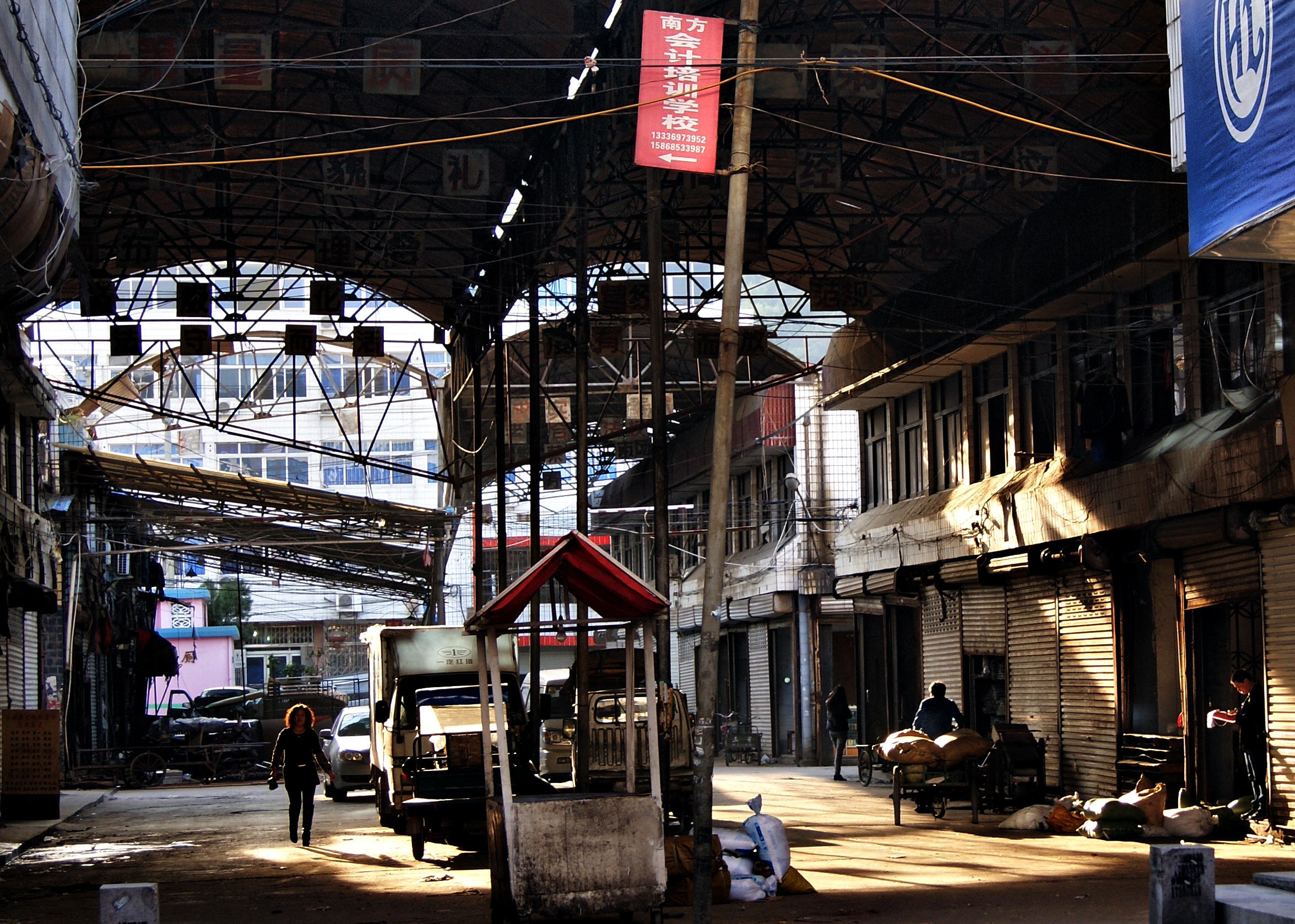
Qiaotao Market was the first officially authorised rural market in China under Communist rule

Reform measures followed in quick succession. On 8 January 1979, Wenzhou reopened eleven grain and edible-oil markets, including Wutian, Zhuangyuan, and Quxi, allowing farmers and production teams that had met procurement quotas to sell surplus grain and oil. In April 1980, Wenzhou piloted greater managerial autonomy for collectively owned industrial enterprises. In May, homes in Puxieshi were put up for sale, pioneering the commercial housing model in China. In October, the Jinxiang Credit Cooperative introduced floating interest rates, the first such experiment nationwide. In December, Zhang Huamei received China’s first sole trader licence from the Wenzhou Municipal Administration for Industry and Commerce.

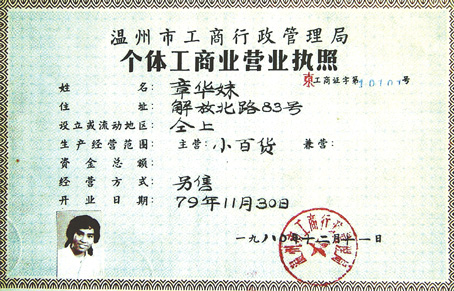
China’s first sole trader licence, issued in Wenzhou in 1979

Wenzhou’s reform experiments provoked sharply divided reactions. Critics questioned whether they were “socialist or capitalist” in nature, yet the initiatives nonetheless won backing from senior officials at both local and central levels of the Communist Party. In 1984, the Wenzhou municipal leadership formally rehabilitated 8 businesspeople who had previously been denounced for “getting rich too conspicuously”. In April, Longgang was established and built through pooled investment by farmers, becoming China’s first “farmer-built city”. In May, Wenzhou was designated one of fourteen coastal open cities. In July, the city launched pilot reforms introducing the factory director responsibility system in state-owned enterprises. In 1985, Jiefang Daily first coined the term “Wenzhou Model”. The following year became known as the “Wenzhou Year”, as the city’s distinctive approach to developing a commodity economy attracted more than 600,000 visitors for field trips and study visits. In 1987, Wenzhou was approved by the State Council as one of the country’s first thirteen pilot areas for rural reform. Between 1978 and 1985, Wenzhou’s combined industrial and agricultural output grew by nearly 200%, while per capita incomes rose sharply; local farmers even earned more than the average university lecturer. As reform-related tensions surfaced, the State Council formally recognised the legal status of private firms, and the National People’s Congress enacted legislation to regulate administrative disputes. The surge in visitors became so overwhelming that, in 1988, the State Council issued an order suspending all study visits to Wenzhou.

Rui'an was elevated to a county-level city in 1987

In the late 1980s, disorder in Wenzhou’s markets, most notably the widespread production of counterfeit and substandard goods, prompted a nationwide clean-up. In 1989, students in Wenzhou echoed the democracy movement in Beijing, although local business owners largely remained aloof. Debate over the “Wenzhou Model” intensified, and the city was briefly portrayed as an example of "Peaceful Evolution", where market-driven reform that could ultimately undermine Communist rule. Amid concerns over the political climate, a number of private entrepreneurs voluntarily suspended operations. In response to mounting controversy, the Party Central Committee and the State Council dispatched four investigation teams to Wenzhou; all ultimately reaffirmed support for its reform trajectory.

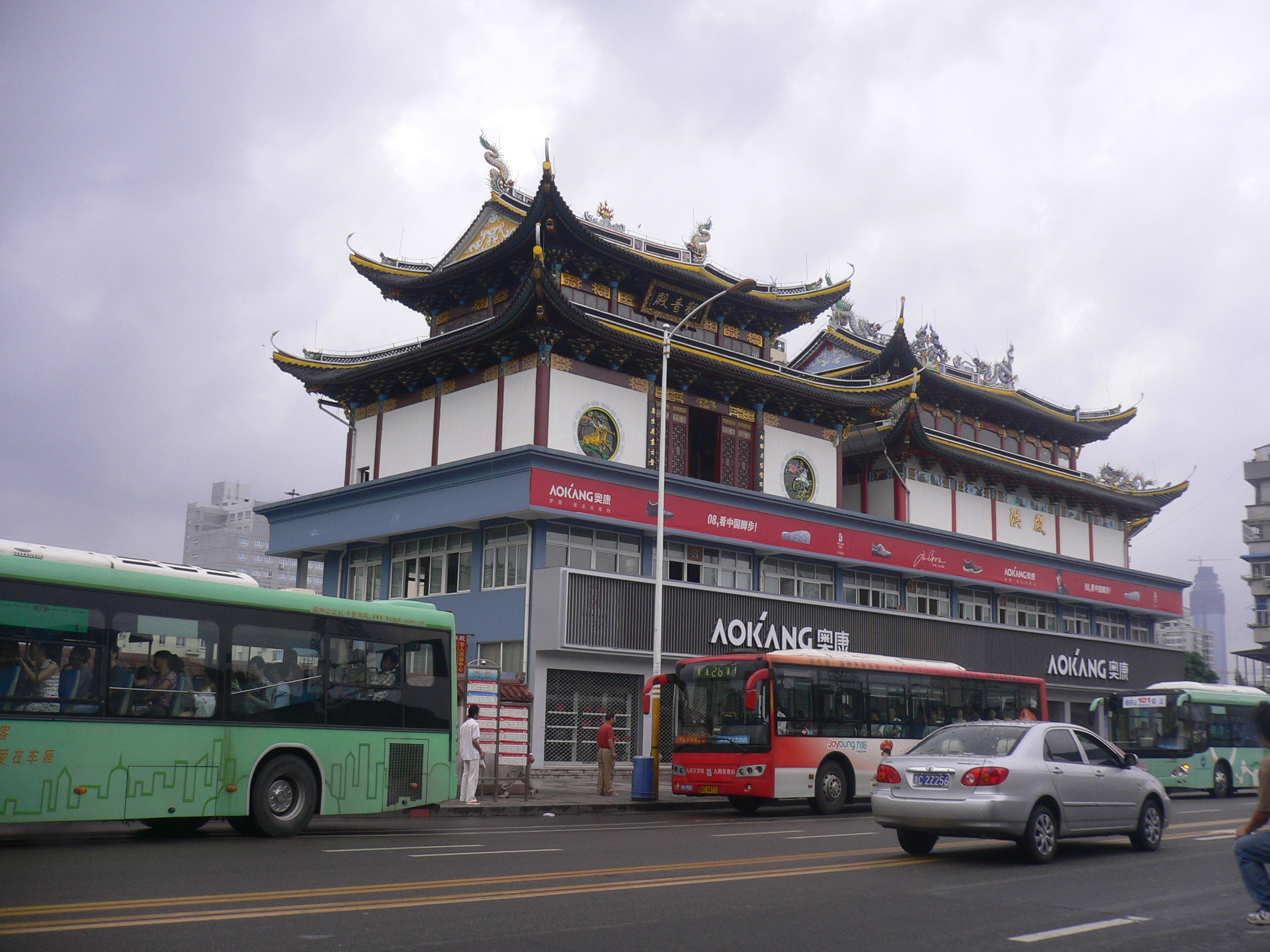
The ground floor of the Daoist temple New Hongdian in Wenzhou, converted into a retail shop for Aokang

After Deng Xiaoping’s Southern Tour in 1992 reaffirmed reform and opening, the Wenzhou municipal leadership recalibrated its approach. In 1993 it promoted “quality-led development”, followed in 1994 by a call for a “second start-up”, strengthening regulation, curbing counterfeit production, and encouraging industrial upgrading. Private firms in Wenzhou transitioned from shareholding cooperatives to limited liability or joint-stock companies, and business groups began to emerge. In 1995, Wenzhou entrepreneurs founded the Kunming Wenzhou General Chamber of Commerce, the first cross-regional, non-governmental business association of its kind in China. By the early 2000s, Wenzhou had developed more than twenty industrial clusters each generating over 10 billion yuan in annual output, alongside dozens of nationally designated industrial production bases. For many years, per capita disposable income ranked first among Zhejiang’s cities and consistently placed among the top three nationwide.

=== Industrial transition ===
After 1998, Wenzhou’s economic growth began to slow. Meanwhile, large numbers of Wenzhou people started to settle outside the city. By 2001, around 1.6 million were working in other parts of China in commerce or services. Overseas and domestic Wenzhou communities took shape in places such as Zhejiang Village in Beijing, Belleville in Paris, and Prato in Italy. Once commercial opportunities were identified, Wenzhou businesspeople often mobilised kinship and hometown networks to act collectively, with a marked preference for sectors such as real estate and mining. As migration spread, Wenzhou chambers of commerce expanded rapidly across China and abroad.

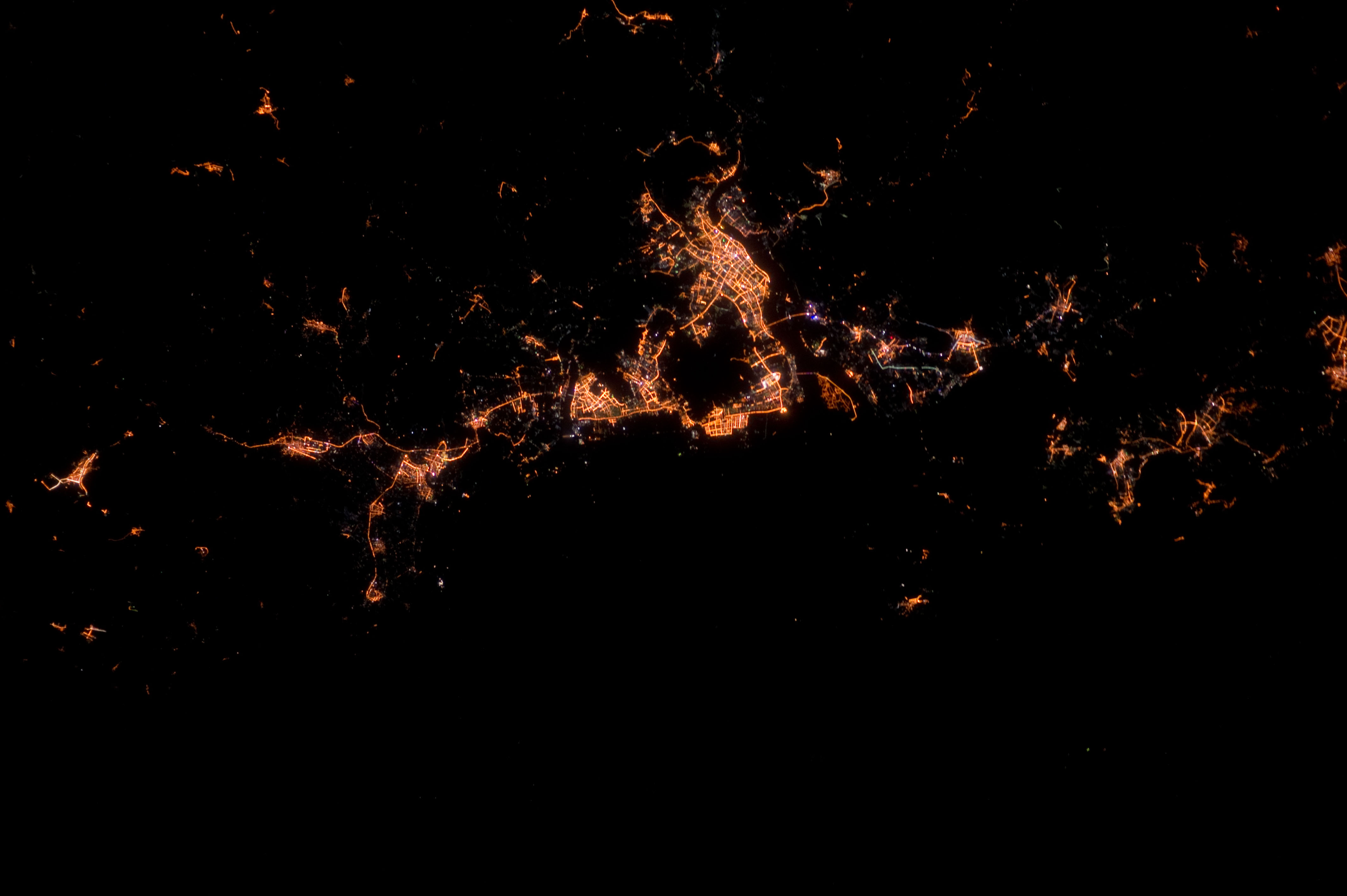
A night view of Wenzhou from the International Space Station in 2012

From 2001 onwards, groups of Wenzhou investors began purchasing residential property collectively in Shanghai which later extended their activities nationwide and overseas. After 2004, large volumes of capital flowed into property speculation and private lending, contributing to a contraction of the local real economy. The global financial crisis of 2008 further strained small and medium-sized enterprises, while informal finance expanded rapidly. From 2010, tighter national monetary policy reduced bank lending, leading to broken cash flows at some firms. Guarantee companies and mutual-guarantee networks were hit in succession, prompting direct intervention by local government.

Following the private lending crisis, Wenzhou’s property prices declined continuously from 2012, falling back to around 2007 levels and wiping out large amounts of accumulated private wealth. In July 2011, a rear-end collision between two southbound high-speed trains in Wenzhou drew intense domestic and international attention. From 2014, competitive church construction among local Christian communities prompted government intervention; many churches were forcibly demolished or had crosses removed, triggering prolonged disputes. In 2020, Wenzhou, as China’s second city to enter COVID-19 lockdowns, shortly after the outbreak in Wuhan due to the massive returning Wenzhou people during the Chinese New Year, suffered a severe economic shock.

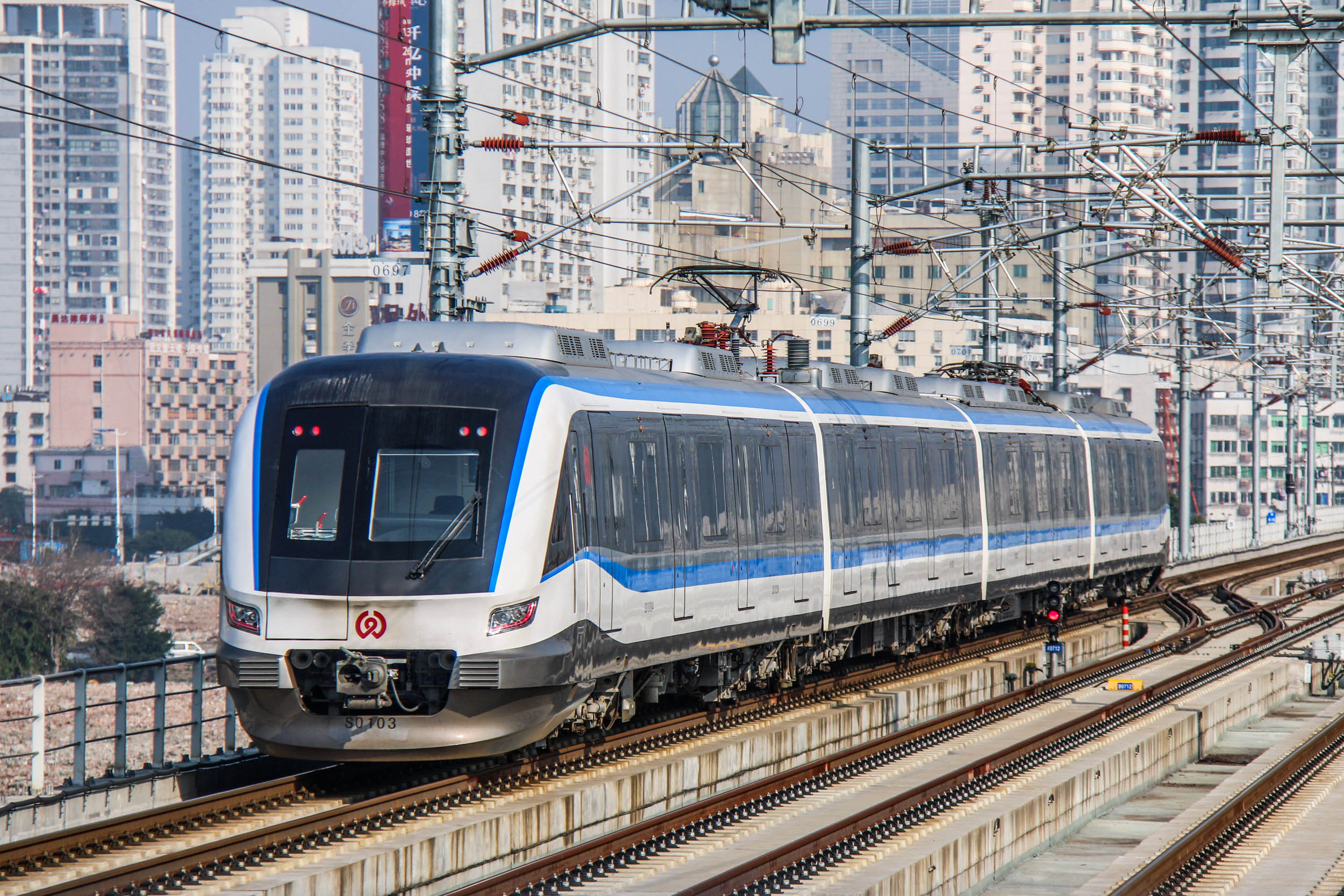
Wenzhou Rail Transit Line S1 opened in 2019

Since the financial crisis in 2011, the municipal government has sought to steer industrial upgrading, shifting from fragmented, low-end production towards more technology-intensive sectors. In March 2012, Wenzhou was approved by the State Council as a pilot zone for financial reforms in China. In 2012, the TV drama Family On The Go popularised Wenzhou’s entrepreneurial history, attracted nationwide attention, and helped reshape public perceptions of the city’s business culture. In 2013, the municipal leadership launched a campaign encouraging Wenzhou entrepreneurs to return and invest locally.

Since early 2020s, signs of recovery have become clearer: population growth and economic expansion have returned to above the provincial average, while new growth areas, including digital industries and new energy, have taken shape. Wenzhou also established Zhejiang’s first dedicated artificial intelligence administrative body to support industrial development. In 2025, the city’s GDP exceeded 1 trillion yuan, the 28th in China.

== Geography ==
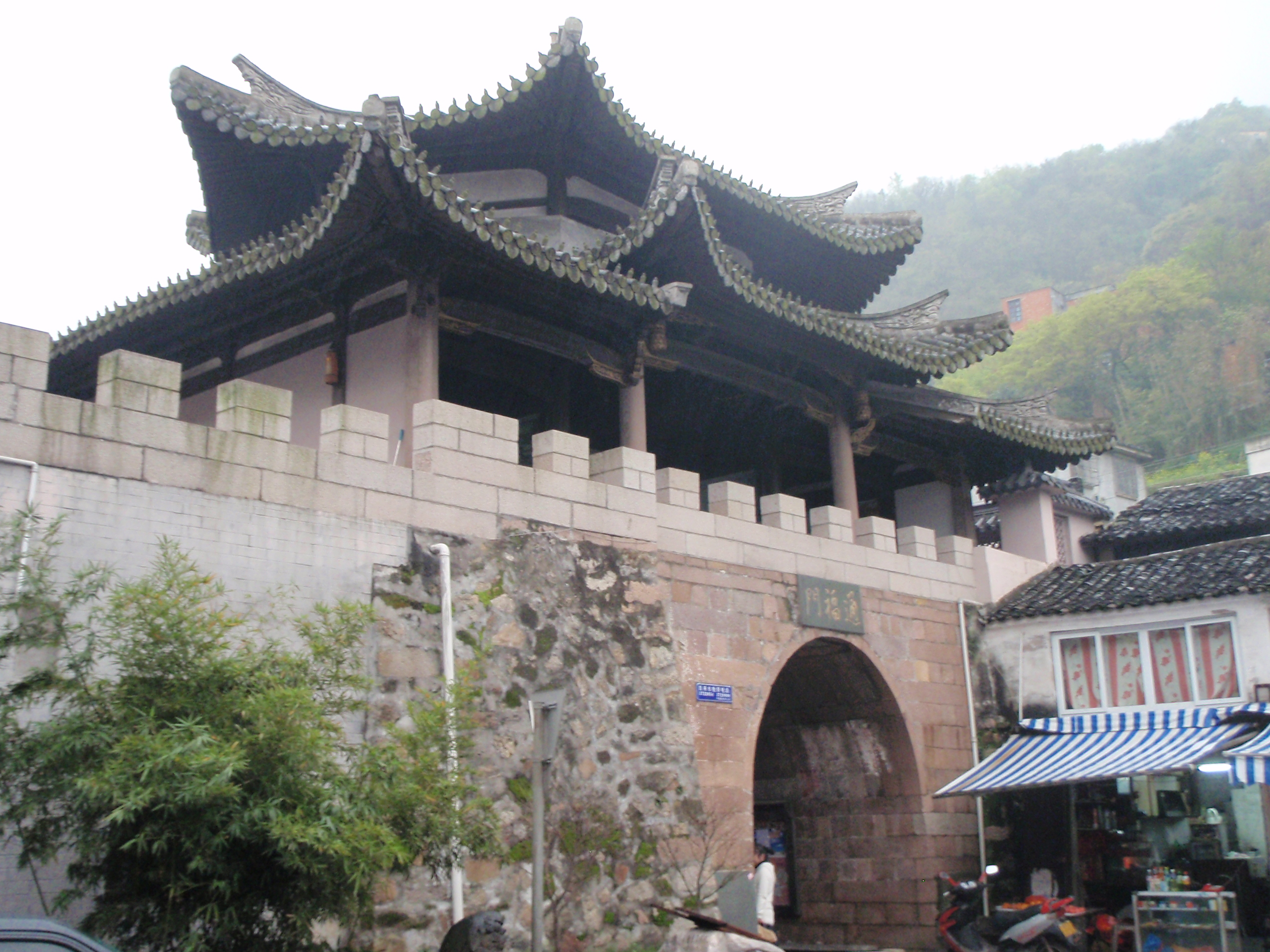
Tongfu Gate in Pingyang is a mountain pass linking Zhejiang with Fujian

Wenzhou is located in the southeastern Zhejiang of China. It borders the East China Sea to the east, adjoins Fujian to the south, neighbours Lishui to the west and northwest, and meets Taizhou to the north and northeast. The municipality covers a land area of 12,110 km^{2} (4,680 sq mi) and a maritime area of 8,649 km^{2} (3,339 sq mi).

Its terrain is dominated by low mountains and hills, with plains and offshore islands as secondary features. The landscape slopes from southwest to northeast, traversed by mountain ranges including the Donggong, Kuocang, and Yandang ranges. The highest peak is Baiyunjian in Taishun, at 1,611.3 m (5,286 ft) above sea level. The eastern plains are interlaced with dense river networks, with the Ou River, Feiyun River, and Ao River forming the principal drainage systems. The city has more than 150 rivers in total, a coastline extending 502 km (312 mi), and approximately 714 islands.

Wenzhou has a humid subtropical climate, with distinct seasons and abundant rainfall. Mean annual temperatures range from 17.3–19.4 °C (63.1–66.9 °F), while average annual precipitation varies between 1,113–2,494 mm (43.8–98.2 in).

=== Landscape ===
Wenzhou lies in a transitional zone between the mountainous regions of southern Zhejiang and the coast of the East China Sea. The overall terrain slopes from south-west to north-east, with mountains, hills, river-valley basins, and coastal plains interspersed. This produces a fourfold geomorphological pattern: mid- to low-mountain areas in the west; low mountains, hills, and basins in the centre; plains and tidal flats in the east; and offshore island zones along the coast. The Ou River, Feiyun River, and Ao River constitute the city’s three major drainage systems, with river valleys extending along their main courses and tributaries.

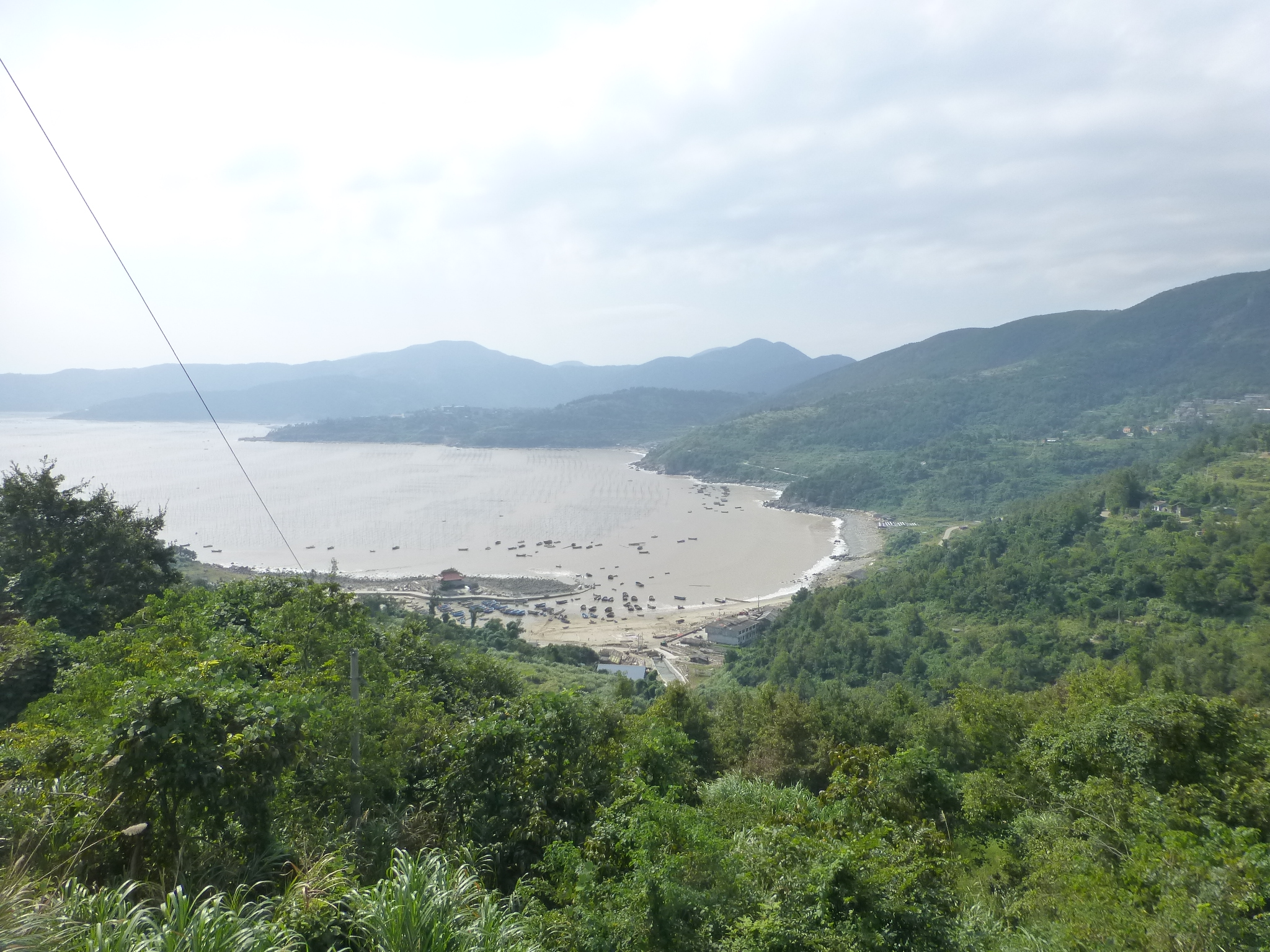
On the coast of the Dayu Bay in Cangnan County

In the Southern Yandang Mountains, incision by the Feiyun and Ao rivers has created a series of intermontane and river-valley basins of varying size, which connect with the surrounding low mountain–hill landscape. Wenzhou’s mountain ranges belong mainly to three systems: the Donggong, Kuocang, and Yandang ranges. After entering Wenzhou, the Kuocang Range extends across much of Yongjia County, forming the watershed between the Ling River and the Ou River and abutting the Northern Yandang Mountains. The Donggong Range lies along the Zhejiang–Fujian border; its branches form the watershed between the Xiaoxi, a tributary of the Ou River, and the Feiyun River. The Northern Yandang Mountains run along the Yongjia–Yueqing boundary, separating the Nanxi River from eastward-flowing coastal rivers. The Southern Yandang Mountains, a residual branch of the Donggong system, enter from Fu’an in Fujian and extend from Taishun towards western Ouhai. The city contains 17 peaks above 1,000 m (3,300 ft), with Baiyunjian in Taishun County reaching 1,611.3 m (5,286 ft), the highest point in Wenzhou.

The eastern plains are densely interlaced with waterways, including the Wenrui River system, the Ruiping River system, the Pingcang river network, and the Liulehong Plain river network. The Yueqing Plain lies north of the Ou River estuary, stretching from the foothills of the Northern Yandang Mountains in the west to the coast of Yueqing Bay in the east, from Dajing Town in the north to the northern bank of the Ou River estuary in the south, covering about 330 km^{2} (130 sq mi). The Yongjia Plain, on the northern bank of the lower Ou River and adjoining the Yueqing Plain, has an area of about 145 km^{2} (56 sq mi).

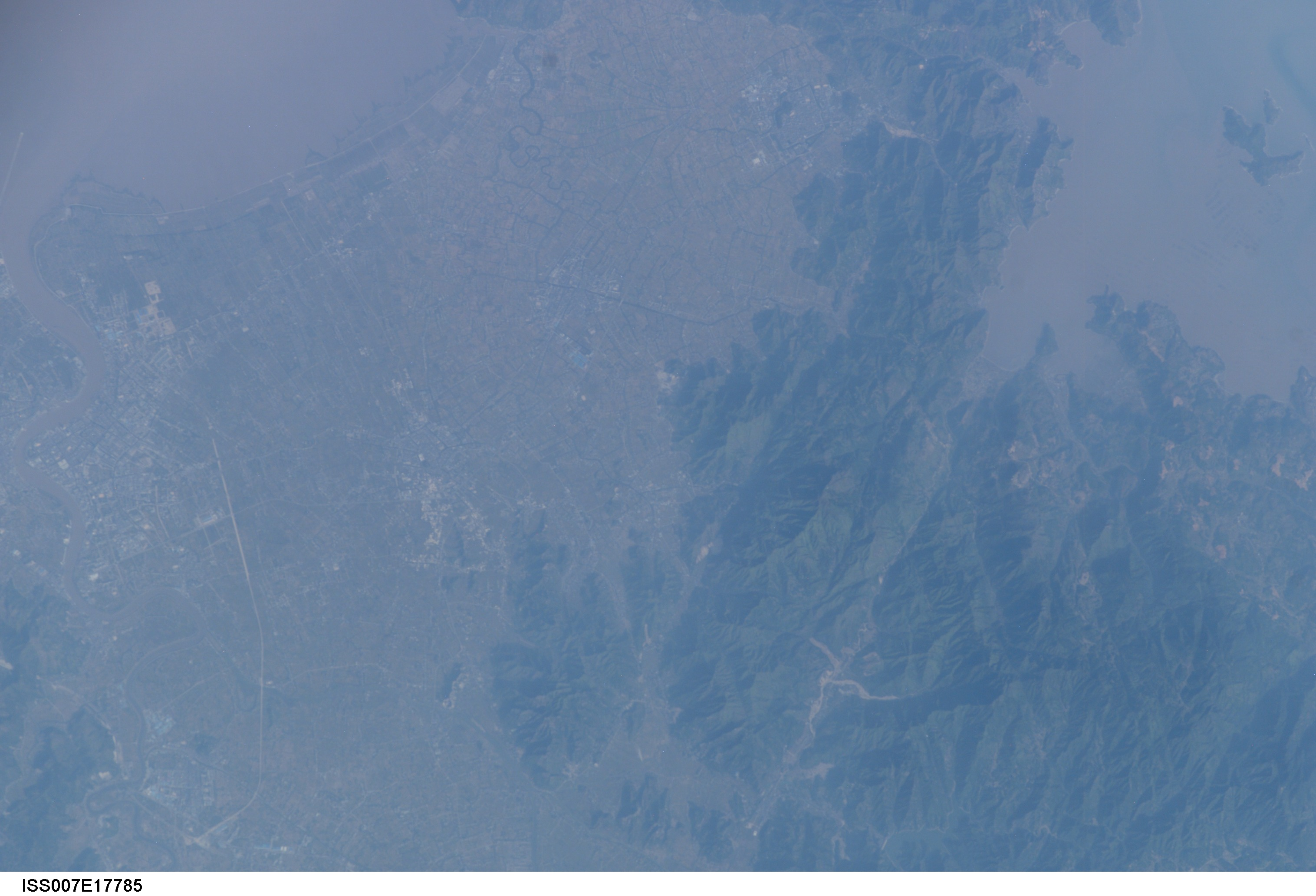
A view of the Jiangnan Plain seen from space

The Wenrui Plain lies between the southern bank of the Ou River and the northern bank of the Feiyun River, comprising the Sanxi, Coastal, Zhuangyuan, Wutian, Xianyan, and Xincheng plains, with a total area of about 543 km^{2} (210 sq mi). The Ruiping Plain occupies the lower reaches and southern estuary bank of the Feiyun River, including Xiangjiang and Mayu in Rui’an and Wanquan in Pingyang, covering about 229 km^{2} (88 sq mi). The Taoshan Plain lies along the northern bank of the Feiyun River and the lower reaches of its tributary Jinchao Harbour, including Taofeng, Tongxi, and Chaoji, with a total area of about 75 km^{2} (29 sq mi). The Beigang Plain extends along the middle and lower Ao River in Pingyang County, incorporating the Ao River Plain as well as the Xiaojiang, Mabu, and Shuitou plains, and covers about 183 km^{2} (71 sq mi). The Jiangnan Plain, also known as the Nangang Plain, lies south of the Ao River, encompassing Longgang City and northeastern Cangnan County, with a total area of about 297 km².

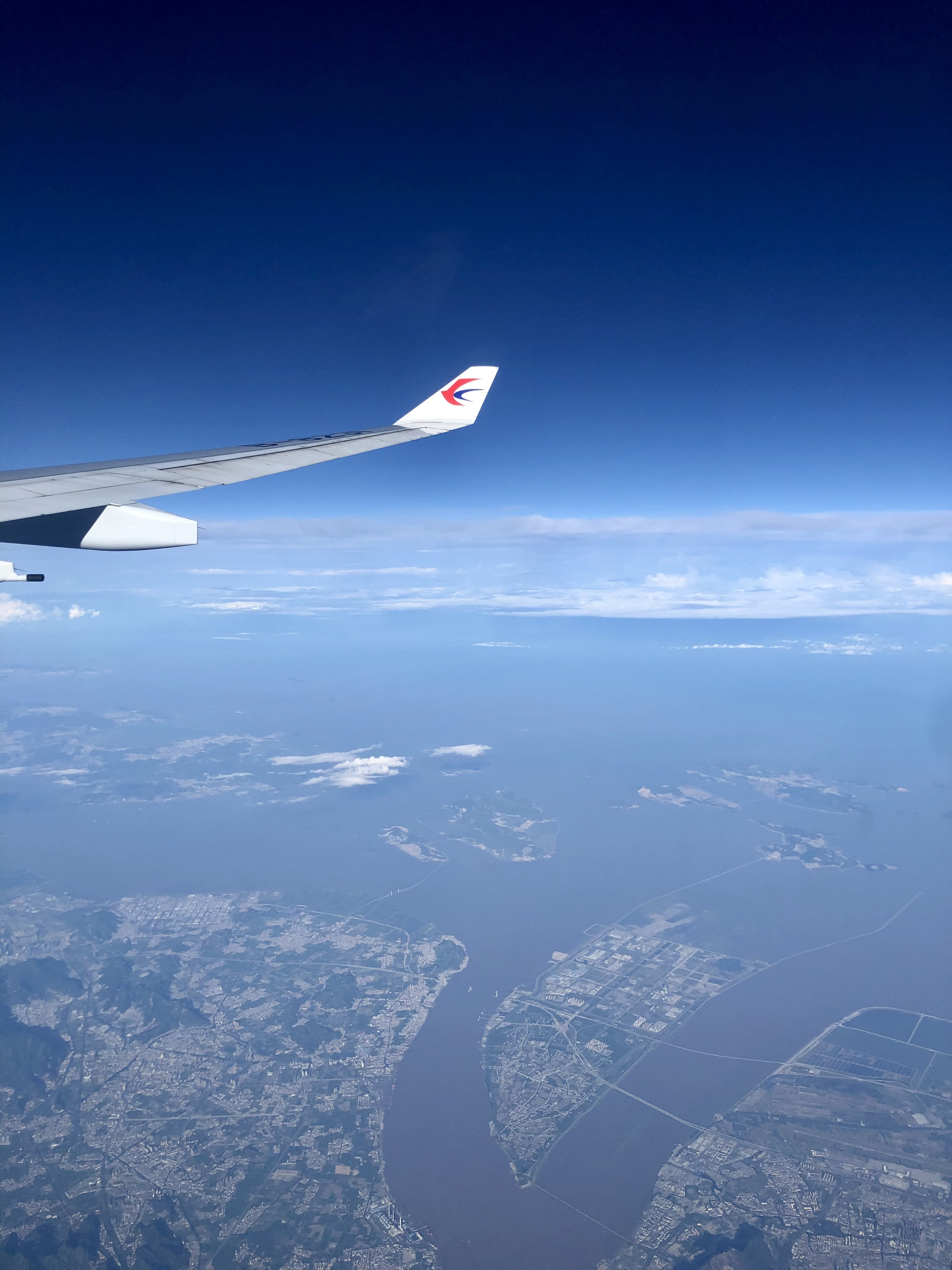
An aerial view of Lingkun Island at the Ou River Estuary, together with the Dongtou Islands

Wenzhou’s coastline is highly indented, with a mainland shoreline of roughly 514 km (319 mi). Bays and tidal inlets are well developed, and near-shore islands are numerous. Coastal bays include Yueqing Bay, Wenzhou Bay, Yanpu Bay, and Dayu Bay. The islands are mainly arranged in chains or clusters, forming archipelagos such as the Dongtou, Dabei, Beiji, Nanji, and Qixing islands. Extensive tidal flats occur along the coast, with the largest continuous area lying south of the Ou River estuary and extending southwards along the shoreline to the Pipamen area of Cangnan County. These tidal flats are distributed outside river mouths and across near-shore shallow seas. Yueqing Bay contains sizeable inner-bay tidal flats. Around Lingkun Island, encircling shorelines and relatively weak hydrodynamics have produced ring-shaped tidal flats. Near the Dongtou Archipelago, smaller tidal-flat patches occur between islands and in adjacent shallow waters, often connected to reefs and shoals. In Cangnan County, enclosed bays at Dayu Harbour and Yanpu Harbour also contain tidal flats of notable size.

==== Land reclamation ====
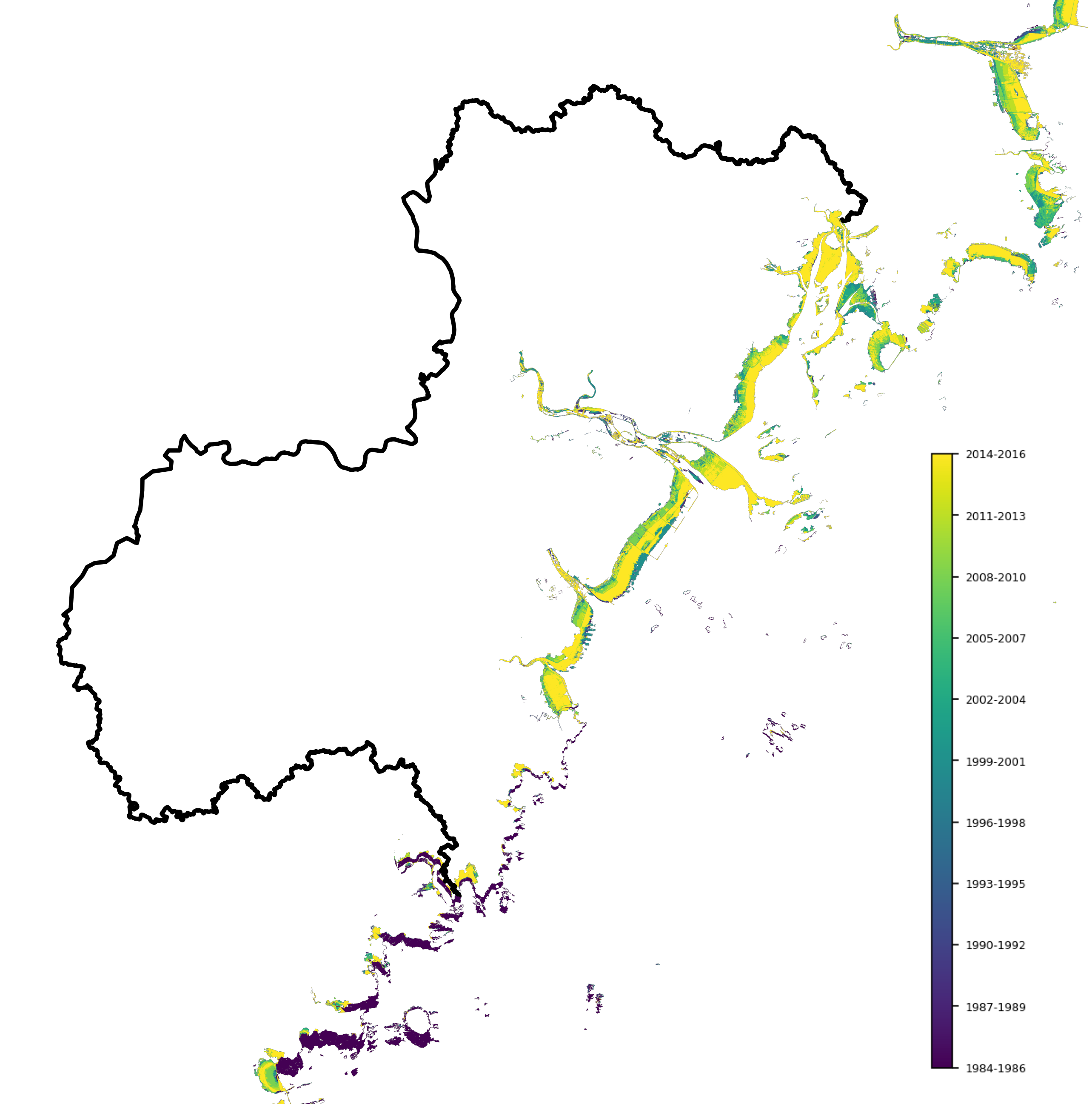
Changes in Wenzhou’s coastal intertidal zone from 1984 to 2016

In April 2003, the Wenzhou Peninsula Project was launched, aiming to link the Dongtou Islands with the mainland. The Wenzhou Oufei Project is China’s largest single land reclamation project. Since 2012, a total of 448 km^{2} (173 sq mi) of land has been reclaimed, accounting for the majority of the city’s recent land expansion. The tideland reclamation was accomplished using a vacuum preloading method, with a planned size of 323.4 square kilometers.

There was academic criticism of the project's damage to waterbird coastal habitats. Centred on Wenzhou’s coastal wetlands, threatened birds are most at risk because rapid urbanisation and land reclamation along the East China Sea flyway compress and fragment key stopover and wintering habitats, and the scale is substantial, with coastal cities including Wenzhou hosting 66 threatened species, about 50.77% of China’s threatened birds.

Wenzhou has also experienced widespread and long-term land subsidence, particularly in its coastal urban areas, a pattern that has been linked in part to extensive land reclamation on soft marine sediments and the subsequent intensity of urban development.

=== Geology ===
Wenzhou lies in the northeastern part of the South China fold belt, and is structurally dominated by the Taishun–Wenzhou fault depression and the Huangyan–Xiangshan fault depression. During the Jurassic and Cretaceous, the Yanshanian tectonic episode was intense, triggering large-scale volcanic eruptions, magmatic intrusions, and faulting. Under the control of NNE-trending faults, a series of fault-bounded basins developed. In the Cretaceous, these basins were filled mainly by fluvial–lacustrine sediments, with intermittent volcanic outpourings, forming numerous small volcanic–sedimentary basins such as Xianyan, Fanshan, and the Shanmen–Wencheng–Taishun basins, where red clastic rocks are common. The oldest exposed rocks in the area are shallowly metamorphosed strata of the Lower Jurassic Fengping Formation. Pre-Mesozoic strata are largely absent, aside from scattered exposures of Upper Palaeozoic metamorphosed clastic rocks and marble. Quaternary deposits occur mainly along the coast and riverbanks, comprising coastal sediments and fluvial alluvium.

As of 2022, the city had identified and registered onshore mineral resources comprising 19 types of solid minerals across 37 mineral occurrences. Non-metallic minerals predominate; key resources include alunite, pyrophyllite, and construction stone and aggregate. Major construction-stone lithologies include K-feldspar granite, granodiorite, and dolerite, while tuff is the most widely distributed source rock for construction aggregate. Ten mineral types are currently exploited, chiefly construction aggregate, with smaller-scale extraction of pyrophyllite, fluorite, decorative dimension stone, and limited development of geothermal resources and mineral water. There are 55 mining licences (45 for solid-mineral mines—39 of which are construction-aggregate mines—and 10 for geothermal and mineral-water sites), as well as 9 exploration licences, covering targets such as fluorite, pyrophyllite, lead, silver, beryllium, illite, and geothermal resources. Alunite is so abundant that sometimes Wenzhou claims to be the "Alunite Capital of the World".

=== Hydrology ===
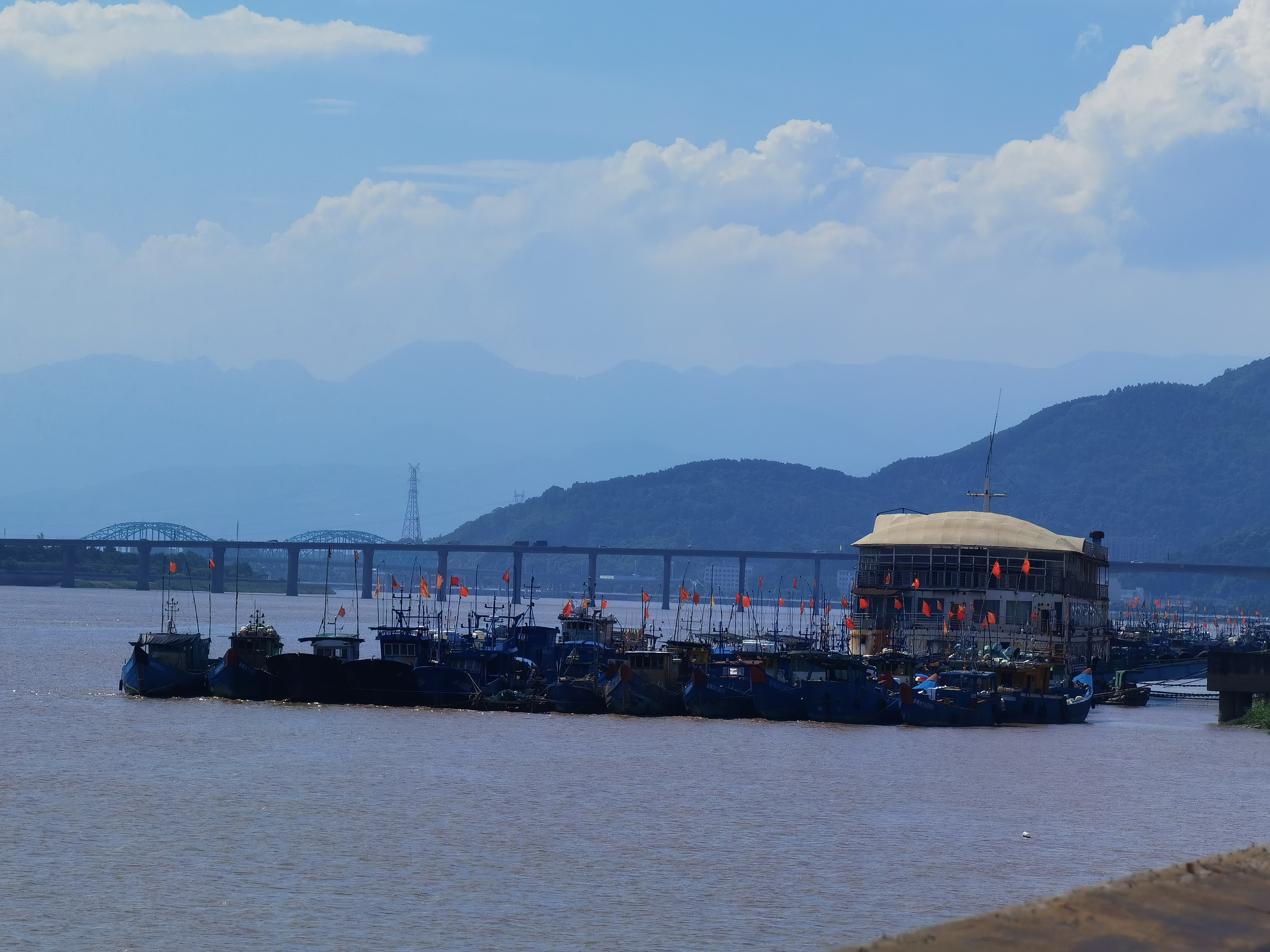
Feiyun Pier on the Feiyun River

The municipality's principal river systems are the Ou River, the Feiyun River, and the Ao River, all of which flow eastwards into the East China Sea. Together, they account for three of Zhejiang's eight major river systems. Wenzhou has more than 150 rivers and streams in total; waterways are especially dense across the eastern plains, where coastal plain river networks are well developed.

- The Ou River is Zhejiang's second-largest river. It rises at Guomaojian on the northwestern slopes of Baishanzu, on the boundary between Longquan and Qingyuan, and runs for 388 km (241 mi), draining 17,859 km^{2} (6,895 sq mi) before reaching the East China Sea. Within Wenzhou, the Ou River is mainly represented by its lower course, about 78 km (48 mi) long with a catchment of 4,066 km^{2} (1,570 sq mi). Downstream of Meiao, the channel widens markedly, from narrow reaches to roughly 500 to 3,000 m (1,600 to 9,800 ft) in width, and near the estuary it develops a deltaic harbour area; the Nanxi River enters on the left and flows into Wenzhou Bay. The total elevation drop from source to mouth is about 1,250 m (4,100 ft). The Ou is a strongly tidal river: the tidal reach is about 90 km (56 mi), with a mean tidal range of 3.92 m (12.9 ft) and a maximum of 5.7 m (19 ft).
  - The Nanxi River is the largest tributary of the lower Ou River. It rises at Luoling on the southern flank of the Kuocang Range in northwestern Yongjia, runs from north to south through central Yongjia, and has a main channel length of 139.92 km (86.94 mi) with a basin area of 2,490 km^{2} (960 sq mi). It joins the Ou River at Qingshuibu.
- The Feiyun River is Zhejiang's fourth-largest river and Wenzhou's second-largest. It originates at Zhongxi Village in Jingnan Township, Jingning She Autonomous County, flows through Taishun, Wencheng, and Rui'an, and enters the East China Sea. The main channel is 198.7 km (123.5 mi) long and drains 3,713.9 km^{2} (1,433.9 sq mi). Its estuary is about 3,000 m (9,800 ft) wide; the tidal reach extends about 59 km (37 mi) inland from the mouth, with a mean tidal range of 4.5 m (15 ft) and a maximum of 6.2 m (20 ft).
- The Ao River is Zhejiang's eighth-largest river and Wenzhou's third-largest. It rises near Guiku at the foot of Wudi Mountain in Shanxi Town, Wencheng, and flows into the East China Sea. The main channel is 82 km (51 mi) long with a basin area of 1,542 km^{2} (595 sq mi)

Across the coastal plains, river networks are structured around tanghe (canalised waterways), distributary channels, and plain drainage ditches. The Yongle Plain network is distributed around Hongqiao, Lecheng, and Liushi in Yueqing, and the Wuniu area of Yongjia. The Wenrui tanghe network collects inflows from multiple mountain streams; its main canal runs from Xiaonanmen in Lucheng to the East Gate of Rui'an's urban area, with a length of about 36 km (22 mi). The Ruiping tanghe network, whose main channel was formerly known as the Jiangnan Canal, runs from Rui'an via Wuqiao and Sunqiao to Pingyang's county seat, a total of 17 km (11 mi). The Nangang Jiangnan river network is organised around the Hengyang distributary channel and is distributed across the two major plains of Nangang and Jiangnan.

== Climate ==
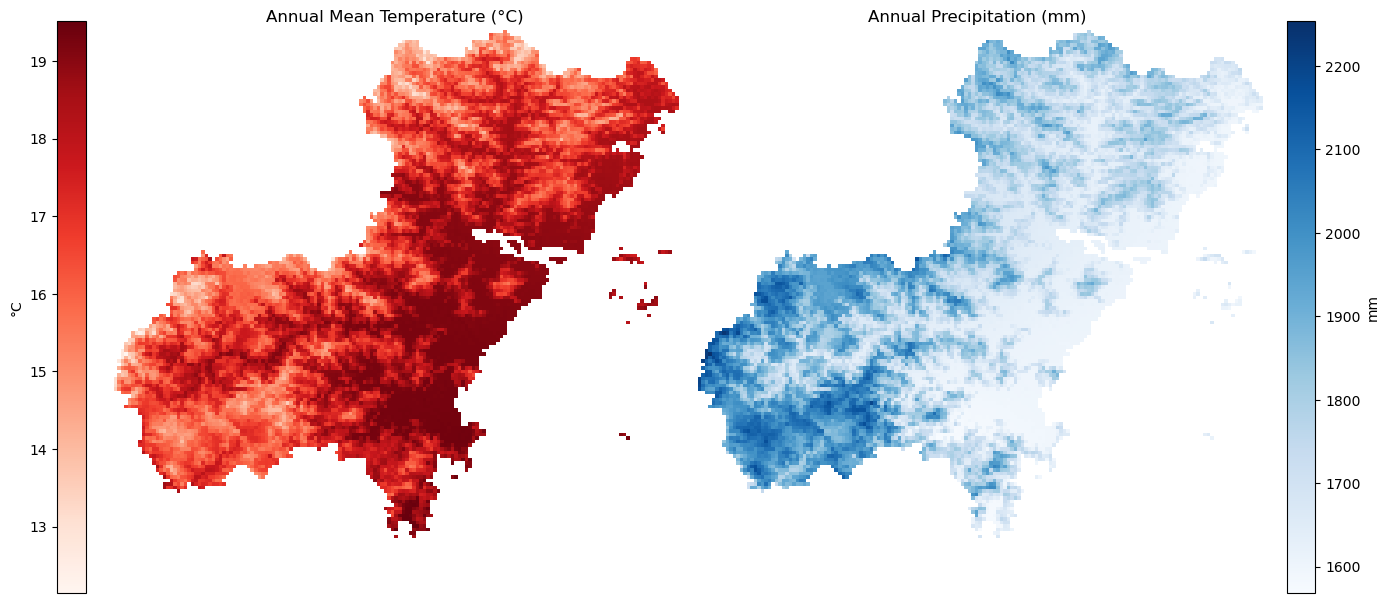
Wenzhou’s long-term average temperature and precipitation

Wenzhou has a humid subtropical climate, with a clear alternation between the winter and summer monsoons. Summers are hot and winters are mild, with four distinct seasons and abundant rainfall. Mean annual temperature ranges from 17.3 to 19.4 °C. Average temperatures are 4.9–9.9 °C in January and 26.7–29.6 °C in July. Severe winter cold and extreme summer heat are uncommon. Annual precipitation ranges from 1,113 to 2,494 mm. The region experiences a meiyu (plum-rain) season in late spring and early summer, and tropical cyclones (typhoons) are most common from July to September. The frost-free period lasts roughly 241–326 days, and annual sunshine totals about 1,442–2,264 hours.

Rainfall is highly seasonal. The flood season typically accounts for around two thirds of annual precipitation. Flooding is concentrated in the meiyu period (May–June) and the typhoon season (July–September), when intense downpours can readily trigger flash floods in mountainous areas. Typhoons occur mainly in summer and autumn; in particularly active years, Wenzhou may be affected 5–7 times, bringing damaging winds and heavy rain. Drought is also a recurrent hazard. The most common—and most damaging—type is midsummer drought, followed by autumn drought; midsummer drought persisting into autumn can significantly affect agriculture and daily life. Midsummer drought is often associated with prolonged control by the western Pacific subtropical high, whereas autumn and winter drought more commonly occur under strong continental high pressure with northerly winds and weaker inflows of warm, moist air. Hail occurs occasionally, mainly in mountainous areas and during the warmer season.

Climate data for Wenzhou, elevation 28 m (92 ft), (1991–2020 normals, extremes 1951–present)
Month	Jan	Feb	Mar	Apr	May	Jun	Jul	Aug	Sep	Oct	Nov	Dec	Year
Record high °C (°F)	25.6 (78.1)	27.9 (82.2)	31.4 (88.5)	33.2 (91.8)	36.1 (97.0)	35.6 (96.1)	41.3 (106.3)	39.9 (103.8)	38.6 (101.5)	36.9 (98.4)	30.3 (86.5)	26.7 (80.1)	41.3 (106.3)
Mean daily maximum °C (°F)	12.9 (55.2)	14.1 (57.4)	17.1 (62.8)	22.1 (71.8)	26.2 (79.2)	29.4 (84.9)	33.3 (91.9)	33.1 (91.6)	30.1 (86.2)	25.9 (78.6)	20.8 (69.4)	15.6 (60.1)	23.4 (74.1)
Daily mean °C (°F)	8.7 (47.7)	9.7 (49.5)	12.6 (54.7)	17.3 (63.1)	21.8 (71.2)	25.2 (77.4)	28.7 (83.7)	28.5 (83.3)	25.7 (78.3)	21.2 (70.2)	16.4 (61.5)	11.0 (51.8)	18.9 (66.0)
Mean daily minimum °C (°F)	5.9 (42.6)	6.8 (44.2)	9.6 (49.3)	14.1 (57.4)	18.8 (65.8)	22.5 (72.5)	25.6 (78.1)	25.5 (77.9)	22.7 (72.9)	17.9 (64.2)	13.3 (55.9)	7.9 (46.2)	15.9 (60.6)
Record low °C (°F)	−4.5 (23.9)	−3.9 (25.0)	−1.7 (28.9)	2.4 (36.3)	9.0 (48.2)	14.9 (58.8)	17.9 (64.2)	19.1 (66.4)	13.7 (56.7)	5.7 (42.3)	0.2 (32.4)	−3.5 (25.7)	−4.5 (23.9)
Average precipitation mm (inches)	66.7 (2.63)	91.8 (3.61)	146.3 (5.76)	139.3 (5.48)	178.3 (7.02)	275.9 (10.86)	172.1 (6.78)	236.8 (9.32)	211.1 (8.31)	80.2 (3.16)	77.1 (3.04)	60.1 (2.37)	1,735.7 (68.34)
Average precipitation days (≥ 0.1 mm)	12.7	13.9	17.6	16.6	16.9	18.4	12.9	16.0	12.8	8.3	10.7	10.6	167.4
Average snowy days	1.0	0.8	0.2	0	0	0	0	0	0	0	0	0.3	2.3
Average relative humidity (%)	74	79	82	81	81	84	80	81	78	73	72	70	78
Mean monthly sunshine hours	101.2	95.6	106.3	122.2	123.6	111.4	208.8	202.5	168.8	172.0	123.3	125.4	1,661.1
Percentage possible sunshine	31	30	29	32	29	27	49	50	46	49	39	39	38
Source: China Meteorological Administration all-time extreme temperatureall-time May record high

== Administration ==
=== Incumbent leadership ===
Institution				
Institution	CCP Wenzhou Municipal Committee	Wenzhou Municipal People’s Congress (Standing Committee)	Wenzhou Municipal People’s Government	CPPCC Wenzhou Municipal Committee
Title	Secretary	Director	Mayor	Chairperson
Name	Zhang Zhenfeng	Zhang Jiabo	Zhang Wenjie	Shi Aizhu
Ethnicity	Han	Han	Han	Han
Ancenstral home	Hangzhou, Zhejiang	Pingyang, Zhejiang	Lujiang, Anhui	Yueqing, Zhejiang
Born	November 1968 (age 57–58)	May 1965 (age 61)	January 1971 (age 55)	November 1965 (age 60–61)
Assumed office	November 2023	January 2025	December 2023	January 2025

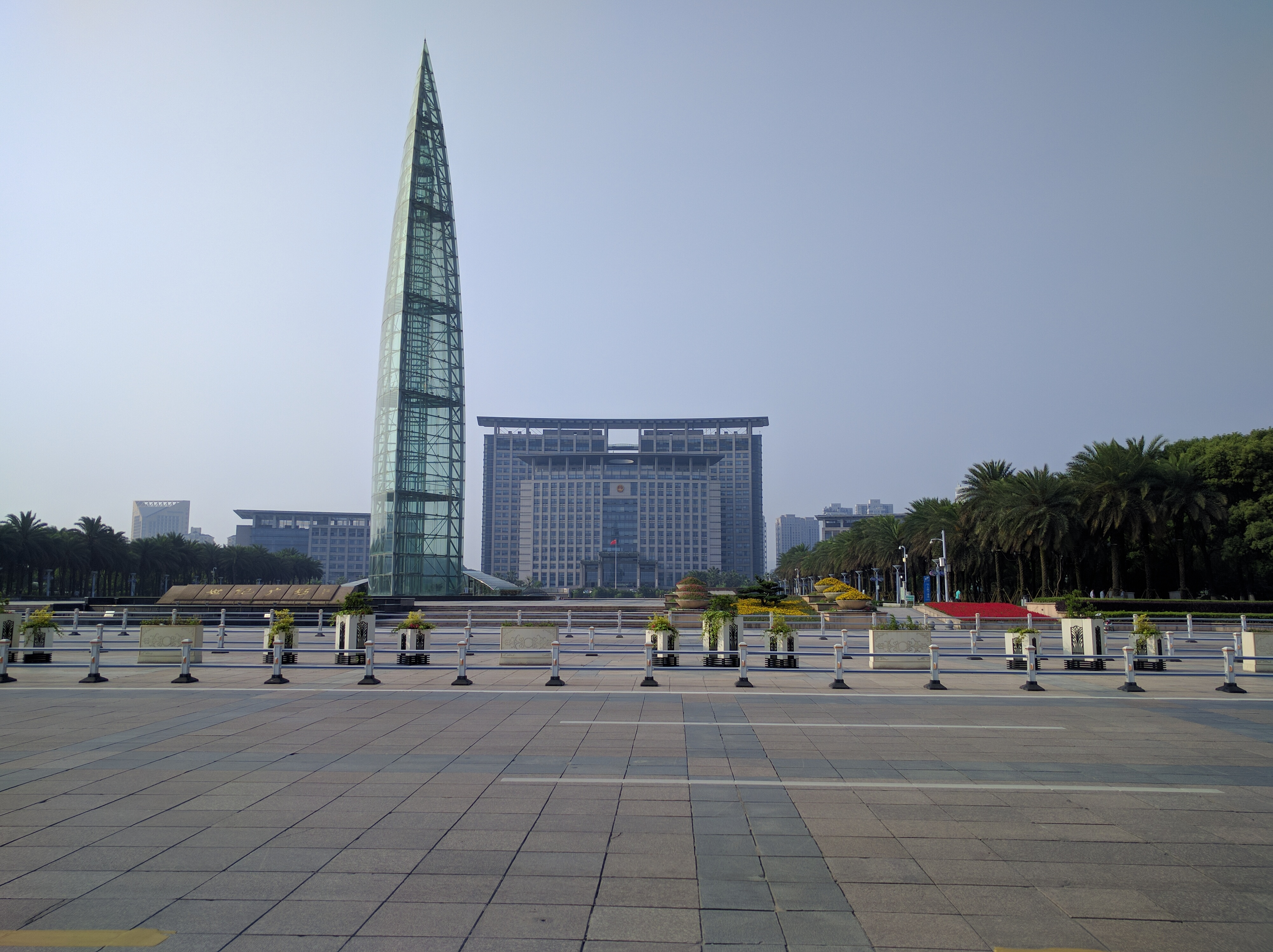
The Century Square and the Wenzhou Municipal Government building

Like all governing institutions in mainland China, Wenzhou has a parallel party-government system, in which the CCP Committee Secretary, officially termed the Chinese Communist Party Wenzhou Municipal Committee Secretary, outranks the Mayor.

=== Administrative divisions ===
On 26 August 1948, the Fifth Special Administrative Region of Zhejiang was established to administer the rural areas around Wenzhou, while the urban areas, namely the Wuyan, Yongqiang, Sanxi, Tengqiao, and Xi'an districts, were separated to form Wenzhou City, placed under the direct administration of Zhejiang. The Fifth Special Administrative Region was later reorganised and became known as Wenzhou Prefecture.

In January 1952, Lishui Prefecture was abolished, and the five counties of Lishui, Yunhe, Longquan, Jingning, and Qingyuan were incorporated into Wenzhou Prefecture. In May 1954, Taizhou Prefecture was likewise abolished, with Wenling, Huangyan, and Xianju counties, as well as the Haimen directly administered area, being reassigned to Wenzhou. Taizhou Prefecture was briefly re-established between 1957 and 1958. Between 1962 and 1963, both Taizhou Prefecture and Lishui Prefecture were successively restored, after which the overall administrative configuration of Wenzhou largely stabilised.

In 1981, Wenzhou City and Wenzhou Prefecture were merged to form the Wenzhou Municipal People's Government. In June, Cangnan County was created from the southern part of Pingyang County, with Lingxi as its county seat; in December, Wenzhou's suburban district was reorganised as Ouhai County. In 1983, Wenzhou's East, South, and West districts were designated as urban districts and were renamed Lucheng District the following year. In December 1984, Longwan District was established from parts of Wenzhou's inner suburban areas and Ouhai County. Currently, Wenzhou comprises four urban districts and five counties, and administers three county-level cities.

Administrative divisions of Wenzhou (Note: Figures for Longwan District include four subdistricts under the Southern Zhejiang Industrial Agglomeration Area; figures for Dongtou District include Lingkun Subdistrict under the Oujiangkou Industrial Agglomeration Area.)
Code	Division	Pinyin	Area (2020 survey)	Population (2020 census)	Seat	Postal code	Township-level divisions			
Code	Division	Pinyin	Area (2020 survey)	Population (2020 census)	Seat	Postal code	Subdistricts	Towns	Townships	of which: Ethnic township
330300	Wenzhou City	Wēnzhōu Shì	12,102.65 km^{2} (4,672.86 sq mi)	9,572,903	Lucheng District	325000	66	92	26	5
330302	Lucheng District	Lùchéng Qū	292.80 km^{2} (113.05 sq mi)	1,167,164	Wuma Subdistrict	325000	12	2		
330303	Longwan District	Lóngwān Qū	316.46 km^{2} (122.19 sq mi)	725,049	Yongzhong Subdistrict	325000	10			
330304	Ouhai District	Ōuhǎi Qū	466.28 km^{2} (180.03 sq mi)	963,238	Louqiao Subdistrict	325000	12	1		
330305	Dongtou District	Dòngtóu Qū	272.95 km^{2} (105.39 sq mi)	148,807	Beiao Subdistrict	325700	5	1	1	
330324	Yongjia County	Yǒngjiā Xiàn	2,677.36 km^{2} (1,033.73 sq mi)	869,548	Beicheng Subdistrict	325100	7	11	4	
330326	Pingyang County	Píngyáng Xiàn	1,035.64 km^{2} (399.86 sq mi)	863,166	Kunyang Town	325400		14	2	1
330327	Cangnan County	Cāngnán Xiàn	1,079.34 km^{2} (416.74 sq mi)	843,959	Lingxi Town	325800		16	2	2
330328	Wencheng County	Wénchéng Xiàn	1,296.44 km^{2} (500.56 sq mi)	288,168	Daxue Town	325300		12	5	1
330329	Taishun County	Tàishùn Xiàn	1,768.01 km^{2} (682.63 sq mi)	265,973	Luoyang Town	325500		12	7	1
330381	Rui'an City	Ruì'ān Shì	1,341.53 km^{2} (517.97 sq mi)	1,520,046	Anyang Subdistrict	325200	12	9	2	
330382	Yueqing City	Yuèqīng Shì	1,395.54 km^{2} (538.82 sq mi)	1,453,090	Chengdong Subdistrict	325600	8	14	3	
330383	Longgang City	Lónggǎng Shì	160.32 km^{2} (61.90 sq mi)	464,695	Jinchaihe Community	325802	Not applicable			

== Economy ==
Wenzhou is a port city with a well-documented trading history. It was officially authorised as a port for foreign trade during the Song and Yuan dynasties, while in the Ming and Qing dynasties, it was developed as a coastal defensive stronghold in response, first to wokou raids and piracy and then Koxinga and anti-Qing forces. Historically, Wenzhou was renowned for its highly developed handicraft industries, and is recognised as one of the places of origin of Chinese celadon. Local crafts such as shipbuilding, papermaking, carving, lacquerware, embroidery, and leatherworking were once famous nationwide. In 1876, it was designated as a treaty port under the 1876 Chefoo Convention, which initiated the city's industrialisation and modernisation.

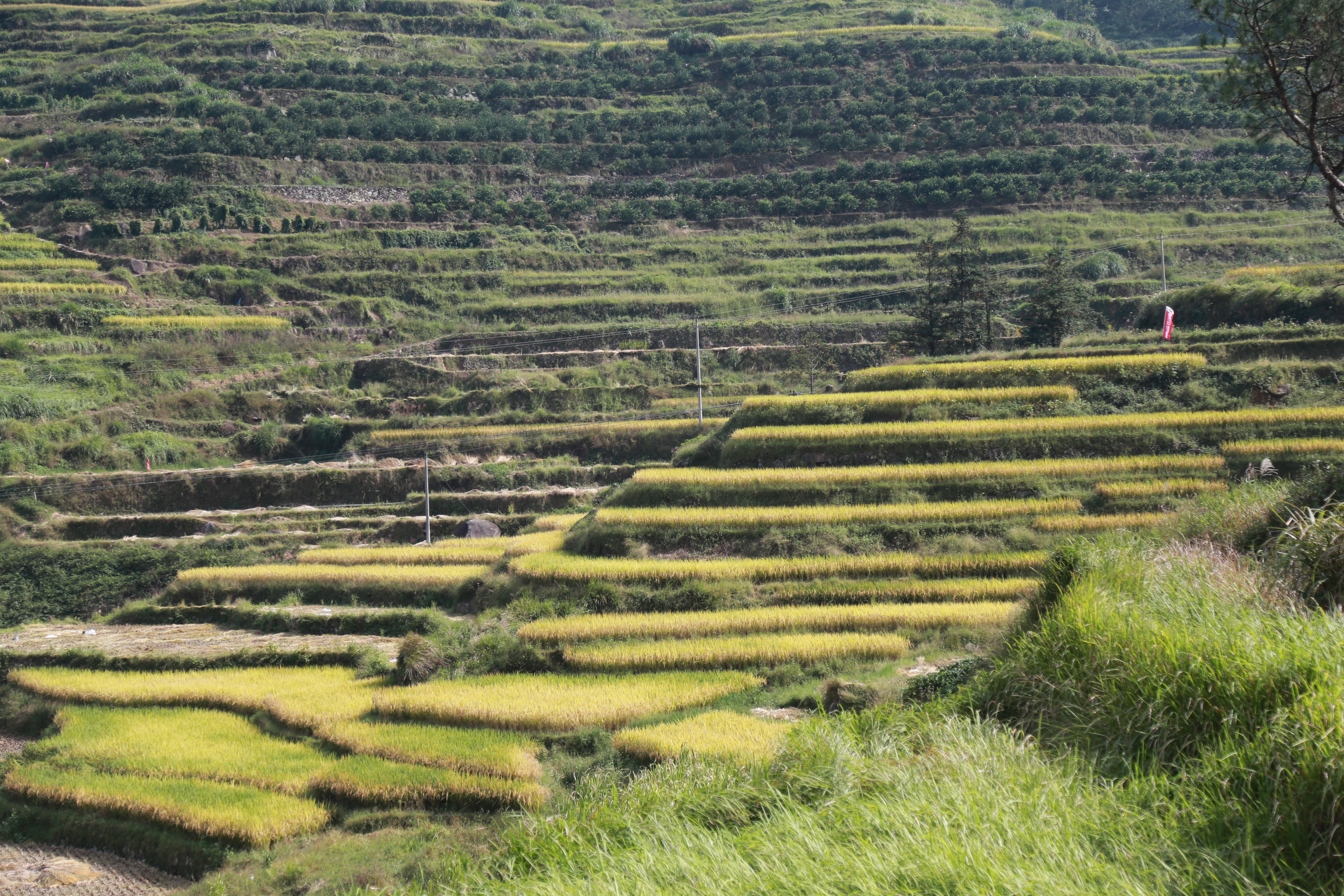
Tangzhai rice terraces in Zeya, Ouhai

Before 1978, Wenzhou had a weak industrial base and poor transport links with Yangtze Delta hinterland. Large state-owned enterprises were largely absent, and unemployment remained high. In 1978, manufacturing output in Wenzhou was less than half that of Ningbo or Huzhou within Zhejiang. The local economy relied heavily on agriculture, with farmers consistently accounting for over 80% of the city’s population, yet agricultural development was constrained by a shortage of arable land. Following the launch of reform and opening up in 1978, Wenzhou rapidly achieved industrialisation and urbanisation during the 1980s through bottom-up, locally initiated reforms led by farmers, and subsequently experienced decades of rapid economic growth. It became one of the wealthiest areas in the country.

After the 2011 private lending crisis, Wenzhou’s economy suffered a severe setback. In response, the local government promoted industrial restructuring, and economic momentum gradually recovered. By 2019, Wenzhou’s GDP had returned to the national top thirty. In the following years, its GDP exceeded 1 trillion yuan; within Zhejiang, Wenzhou became the third city after Hangzhou and Ningbo to reach this level, and it was the 28th nationwide to do so. In 2025, Wenzhou recorded a regional GDP of 1,021.39 billion yuan, representing year-on-year growth of 6.1%, 1.1 and 0.6 percentage points higher than the national and provincial averages, respectively. The growth rate of value added by industrial enterprises above designated size also ranked among the highest in Zhejiang.

=== Private sector ===
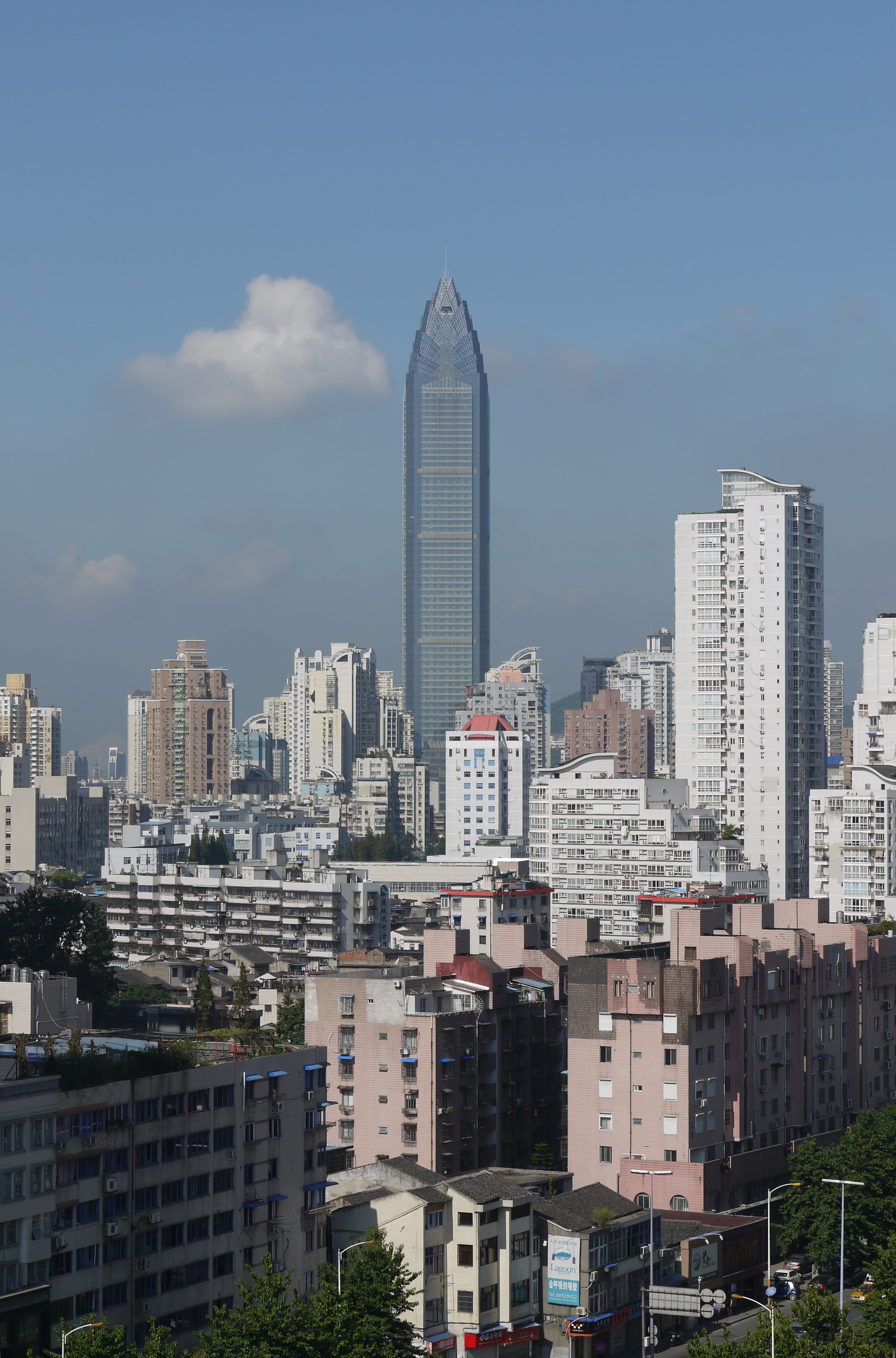
Wenzhou World Trade Centre

Wenzhou has a highly developed private sector, with particularly active private capital and financial activity. As a major centre of the private economy in China, the private sector has long been a key pillar of the city’s development. By November 2025, Wenzhou had a combined total of 1.564 million registered private enterprises and self-employed businesses; value added by private enterprises accounted for 90.8% of the city’s industrial output. In 2012, in response to the private lending crisis, the State Council established the Wenzhou Financial Reform Pilot Zone, aiming to improve financing for small and medium-sized enterprises, build a financial safety net, and strengthen the insurance system. However, as it did not address core issues such as interest-rate liberalisation, the initiative also drew criticism. Since 2020, annual private investment in Wenzhou has exceeded 200 billion yuan, accounting for nearly 60% of total fixed-asset investment; across indicators such as the number of enterprises, contribution to GDP, industrial value added, employment, and tax revenue, the private economy has accounted for over 90%.

Entrepreneurship is widespread among Wenzhou residents, resulting in large numbers of small firms and family workshops. Because small firms often lack collateral and face difficulties accessing bank credit through formal channels, most local households and businesses participate in informal finance networks structured around kinship ties and trusted acquaintances. Wenzhou’s per capita GDP has often ranked towards the lower end within Zhejiang, yet the ratio of per capita disposable income to per capita GDP has consistently remained above 80%, with residents’ per capita disposable income and annual consumption per capita have frequently ranked among the highest nationwide. In 2024, per capita disposable income in Wenzhou reached 70,829 yuan, with urban and rural figures of 81,527 yuan and 44,263 yuan, respectively, while Per capita wage income was 37,521 yuan, including 42,168 yuan for urban residents and 25,980 yuan for rural residents.

=== Public sector ===
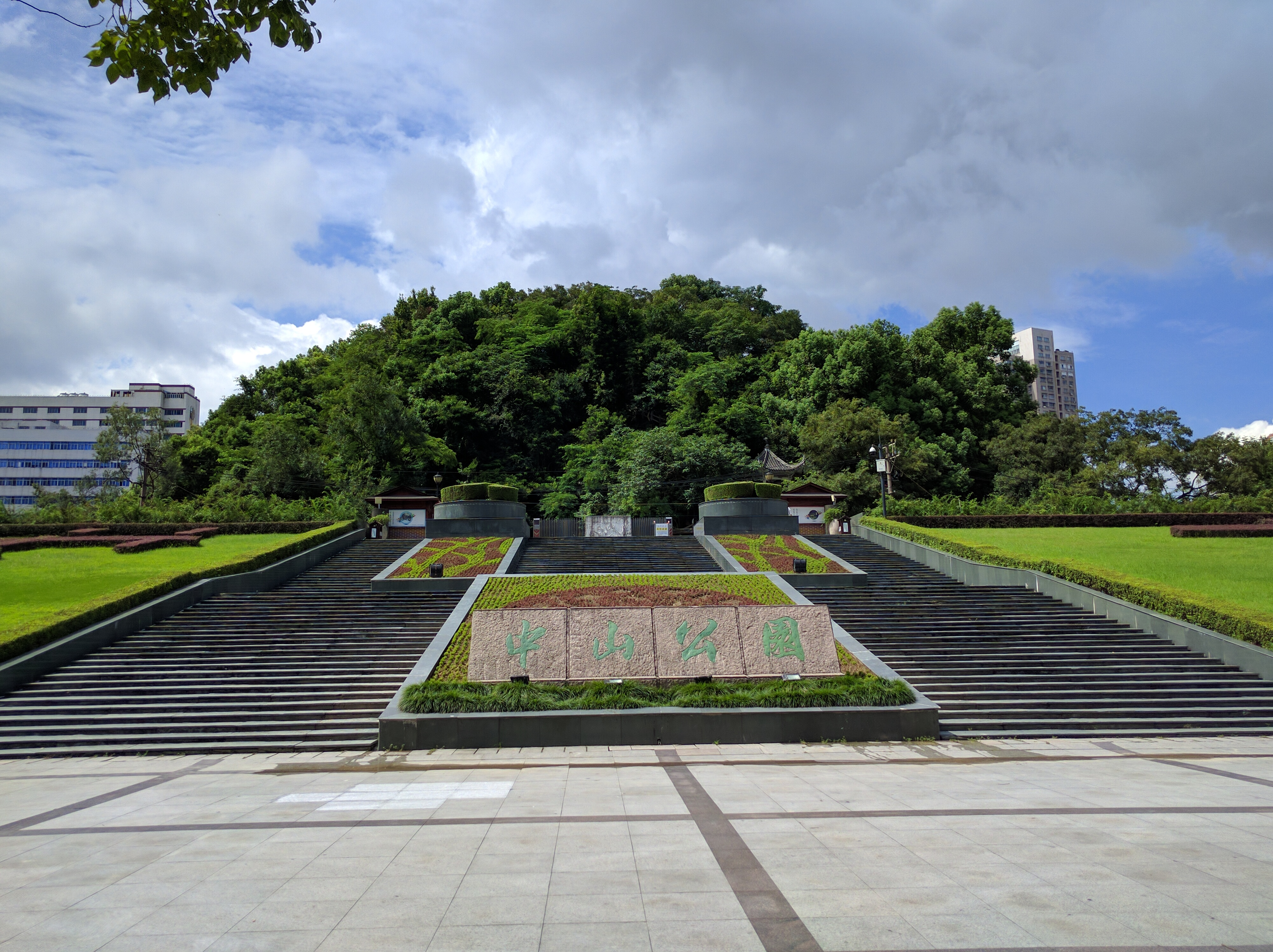
Zhongshan Park in Lucheng

Since 2020, Wenzhou’s general public budget revenue has exceeded 60 billion yuan, ranking third within Zhejiang. Across government revenue at different administrative levels in Wenzhou, taxes make up around 80%, with the remainder coming from non-tax revenue. In Wenzhou’s public spending, outlays on people’s wellbeing, including education, culture, science and technology, and health, as well as support for enterprise upgrading and industrial transition, account for more than 70% of total expenditure.

Wenzhou has also been approved for several national-level pilot programmes, such as the Wenzhou Financial Reform Pilot Zone, one of the first national demonstration zones supported by central government finance for the development of inclusive finance, and a national pilot for deepening financial services reform for private and micro and small enterprises, thereby receiving central fiscal support aimed at strengthening financing for local small enterprises.

In 2024, Wenzhou’s outstanding local government debt balance was 365.414 billion yuan, against a debt ceiling of 365.420 billion yuan. The city’s general public budget revenue totalled 63.258 billion yuan, representing 95.8% of the budget target; major revenue items included value-added tax of 22.814 billion yuan, non-tax revenue of 12.670 billion yuan, and corporate income tax of 6.885 billion yuan. Including transfer revenues of 89.224 billion yuan, total revenue reached 152.482 billion yuan. General public budget expenditure was 117.764 billion yuan, representing 97.1% of the budget target, alongside transfer expenditures of 34.718 billion yuan.

=== Industrial mix ===
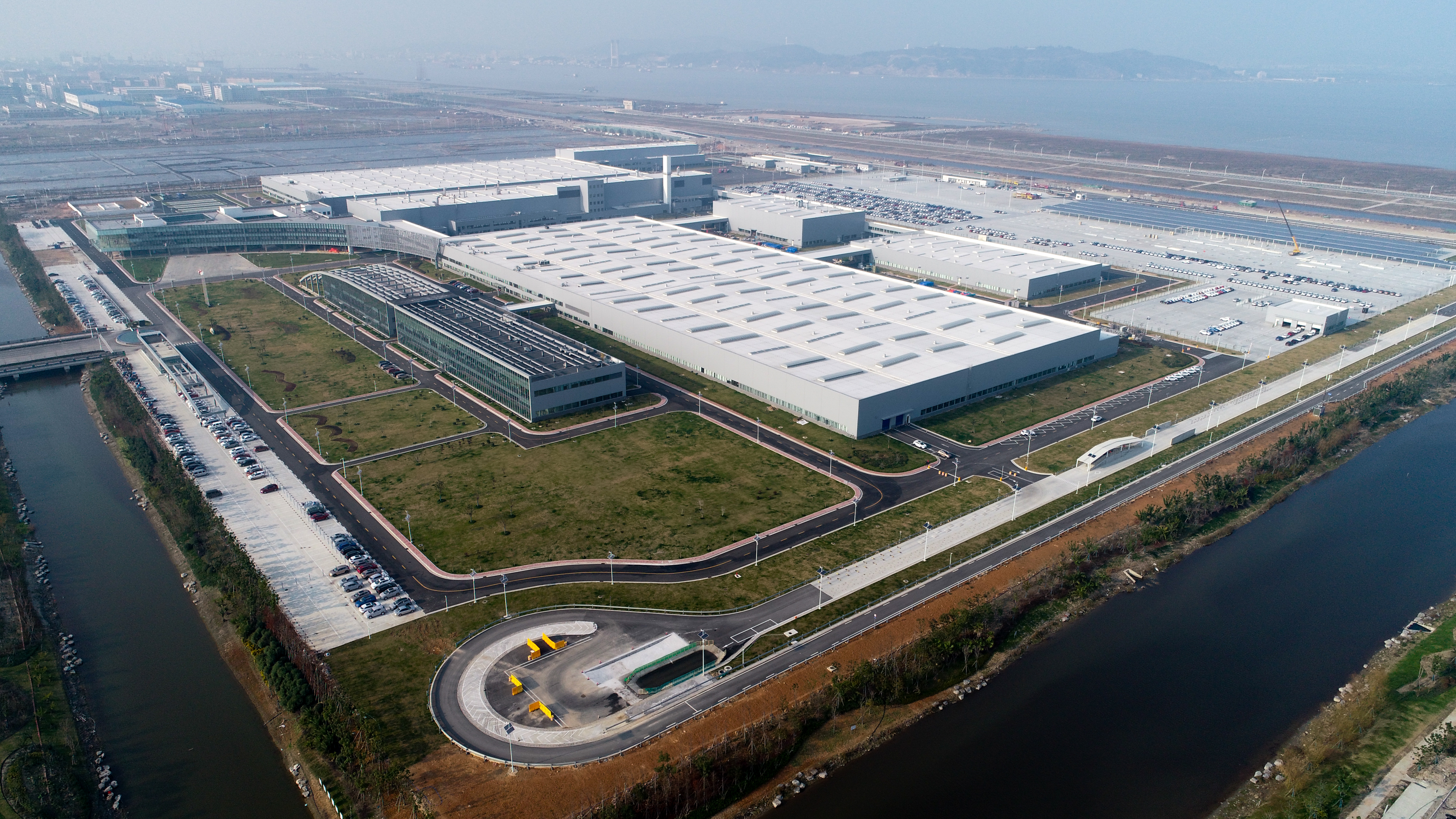
WM Motors Wenzhou plant

In the 1980s and 1990s, Wenzhou built much of its industrial strength on a handful of well-established manufacturing lines, most notably electrical equipment, footwear, garments, automotive components, and pumps and valves. The rapid expansion of manufacturing during this period materially strengthened the local economy. From the early 2000s, some locally sourced capital shifted towards real estate, while parts of the manufacturing base relocated elsewhere. When the private lending crisis hit in 2011, many local firms were exposed to acute cash-flow pressures and disruption. In 2012, Wenzhou pushed to rebalance and upgrade its industrial structure. Policy priorities included faster growth in the digital economy and new technology-led activities such as lasers and optoelectronics and rail transit equipment.

In 2024, value added by the primary, secondary, and tertiary sectors was 19.47 billion yuan, 356.83 billion yuan, and 595.58 billion yuan, respectively, corresponding to an output structure of 2.0%, 36.7%, and 61.3%. Wenzhou has developed two major industrial clusters, electrical equipment and green energy, each exceeding 300 billion yuan in scale. Electrical equipment, long a traditional pillar and the city’s first cluster to exceed 100 billion yuan, has grown into an internationally significant base for small and low-voltage electrical appliances; the green energy sector is also competitive at the national level.

By the end of 2024, Wenzhou had 9,291 industrial enterprises above the designated size, producing industrial value added of 173.69 billion yuan. Total industrial sales output was 857.0 billion yuan, with export delivery value of 105.91 billion yuan; total profits of these larger industrial firms reached 45.77 billion yuan. Wenzhou was home to 63 listed companies and 104 companies quoted on the NEEQ. Several Wenzhou-based private firms, including Tsingshan Holding Group, Dofor International, CHINT Group, Delixi Group, Renmin Holding Group, and Huafon Group, were included in the 2024 list of China’s Top 500 Enterprises.

=== High streets ===
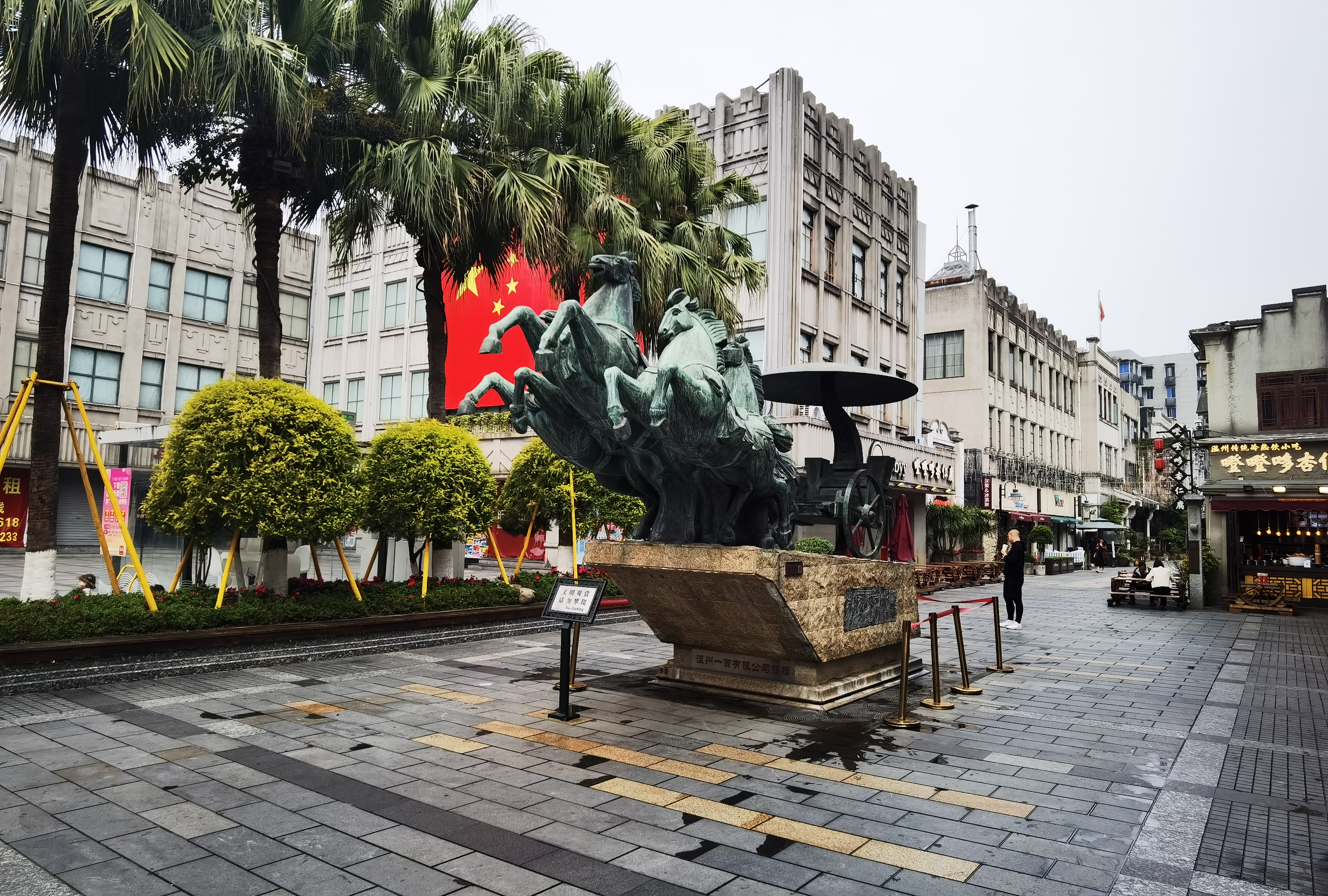
Wuma Street

Since the 1990s, Wenzhou city centre has developed a recognisable shopping core, with Renmin Road as a main commercial spine and nearby Wuma Street as the city’s best-known high-street area. The latter was designated in 1984 as one of the first nationally recognised pedestrian streets. The opening of Kaitai Department Store in 1998 marked a shift from traditional market-style retail towards modern department-store shopping, consolidating the established retail areas around Wuma Street while gradually creating new retail centres in the Binjiang area along the Ou River. During the 2025 Spring Festival period, both Wenzhou MixC and Wenzhou Binjiang MixC ranked among the national top fifty shopping malls on according to Dazhong Dianping.

Outside the city centre, Yueqing was ranked as the county-level jurisdiction with the highest level of urban and county consumption nationwide, according to a report by CCID Consulting. Within Yueqing, Chengnan Subdistrict has concentrated several major retail complexes, including Nanhong Plaza and Zhongjinhui, as well as Songhu Lifang, a provincial-level cultural and creative street district. The area is also served by Xuyang Road Station, one of the busiest stations on the Wenzhou Rail Transit Line S2. In addition, Zhongyi Street and Wuyue Plaza in Rui’an have been identified by the Wenzhou municipal government as priority retail districts for further development.

=== Tourism ===
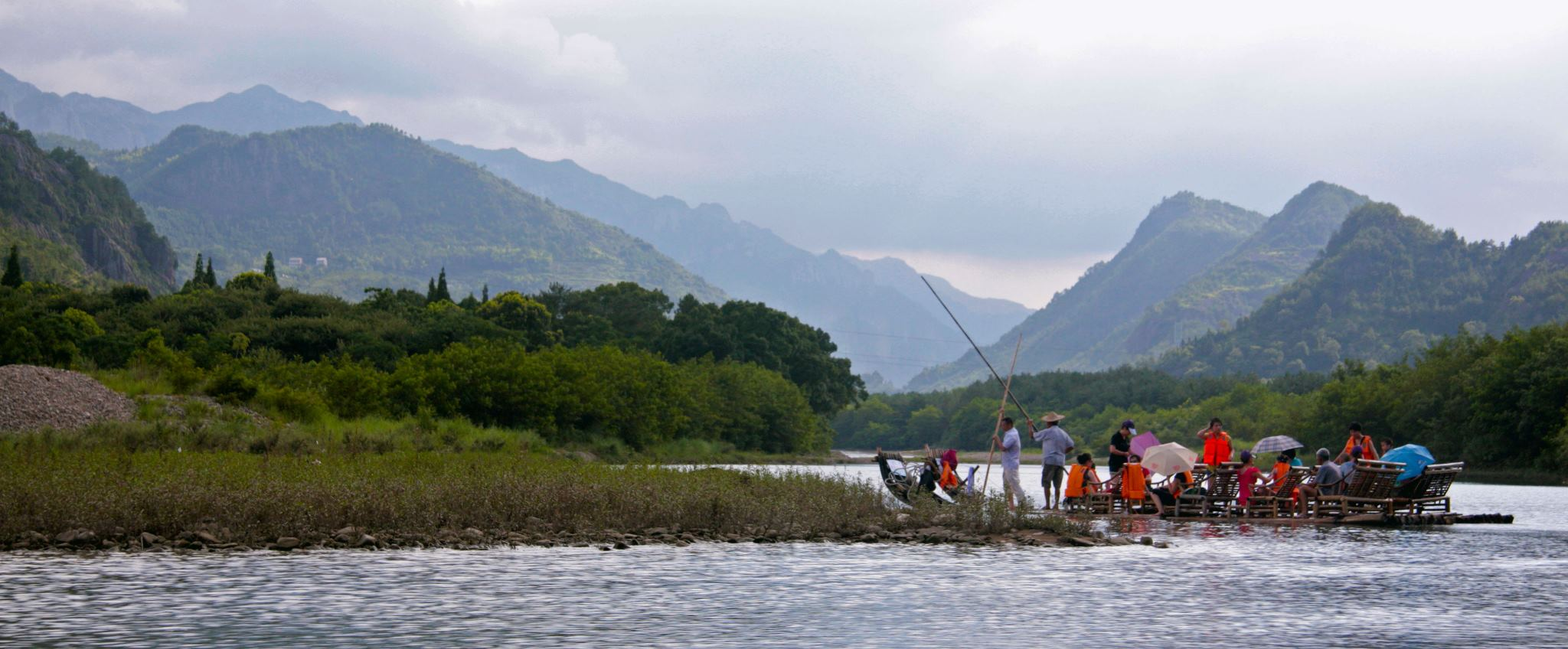
Bamboo rafting on the Nanxi River

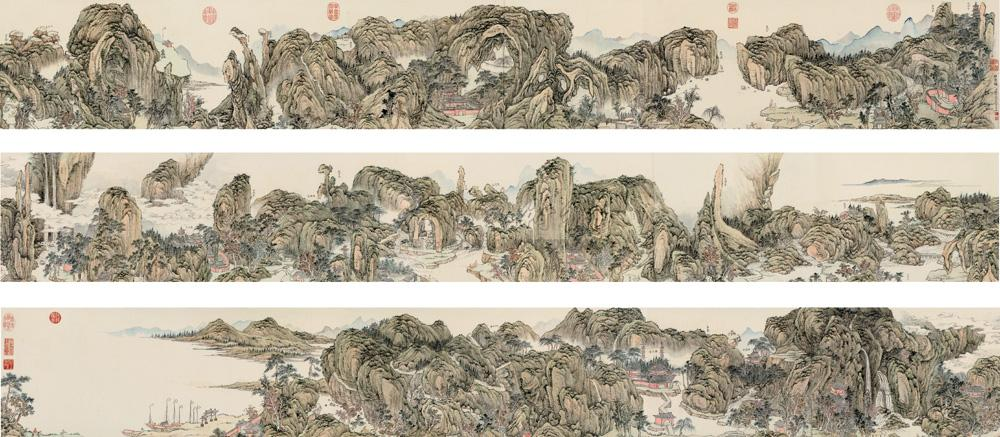
Yandang Mountains, painted by Qian Weicheng, a Qing-dynasty zhuangyuan

Wenzhou’s tourism sector is dominated by the domestic market. In 2023, the city received about 56.84 million domestic tourist visits, generating roughly 76.5 billion yuan in domestic tourism revenue. In contrast, inbound tourism remained limited, with around 91,000 inbound visitors and inbound tourism income of approximately 36.19 million US dollars.

Wenzhou has three national-level scenic areas, namely Yandang Mountains, the Nanxi River, and Baizhangji–Feiyun Lake, with a combined area of 1,637.39 km^{2} (632.20 sq mi). It also had eight provincial-level scenic areas, namely Yaoxi, Xianyan, Zeya, Dongtou, Zhailiao Stream, the Nanji Islands, Radon Springs–Jiufeng, and the Maritime–Yucang Mountains, covering a combined area of 254.26 km^{2} (98.17 sq mi).

=== Local produce ===
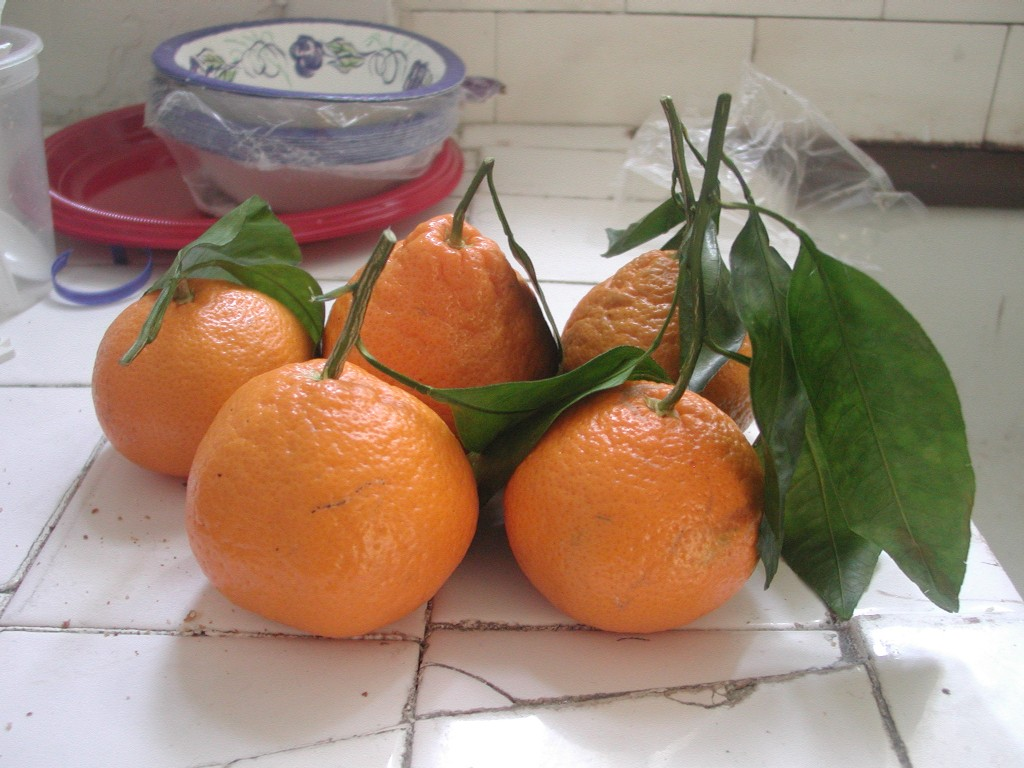
Wenzhou tangerines

Wenzhou is known for local produce, including bayberry, pomelo, loquat, persimmon, chestnut, and pear and tea. Across the municipality, a range of orchard crops are well established, including bayberries, pomelos, loquats, persimmons, chestnuts, and pears, each associated with particular counties and townships. Tea-growing likewise has a long history, with several locally recognised varieties linked to different parts of Wenzhou. Tea has traditionally been produced mainly as pan-fired green tea and black tea for external markets. A notable local speciality is Wenzhou citrus, a distinctive citrus variety associated with Wenzhou, valued for its sweet, juicy flavour with a slight bitterness.

== Demography ==
Wenzhou has the second-largest population in Zhejiang, after Hangzhou, with migration constituting the main driver of population growth. At the end of 2024, the city has a resident population of 9.852 million, an increase of 91,000 from the previous year, yet the natural population growth rate was −0.6‰. During the year, there were 54,000 births, giving a birth rate of 5.6‰, and 61,000 deaths, corresponding to a death rate of 6.2‰. The urbanisation rate of the resident population stood at 76.0%.

Data from the 2020 Chinese census show that Wenzhou’s population increased by 450,801 over the preceding decade, representing growth of 4.94% and an average annual growth rate of 0.48%. The overall sex ratio was 112.86 males per 100 females. Children aged 0–14 accounted for 15.28% of the population, those aged 15–59 for 68.22%, and people aged 60 and above for 16.5%, including 11.71% aged 65 and over.

=== Ethnicity ===
According to the 2020 Chinese census, the city's resident population included 9,189,267 Han people, accounting for 95.99% of the total, while ethnic minority groups totalled 383,636 people, or 4.01%. Compared with the 2010 Chinese census, the Han population increased by 368,877, up 4.18%, but its share of the total fell by 0.7%; ethnic minority populations increased by 81,924, up 27.15%, with their combined share rising by 0.7%. Among Wenzhou’s ethnic minorities, the She people form the largest group, followed by the Hui. The She are described as having originated in the mountainous areas around the Fujian–Guangdong–Jiangxi border; their presence in Wenzhou can be traced back to the Song dynasty or earlier, with larger-scale migration from Guangdong occurring during the Ming and Qing periods. She communities in Wenzhou are often interspersed with Han settlements in Cangnan, Taishun, Pingyang and Wencheng. The history of Hui migration to Wenzhou can be traced back to the Yuan dynasty, although most Hui residents today are thought to have moved from Fujian around the transition from Ming to Qing.

=== Languages ===
Prayers in Wenzhounese at a church in Paris, France

Linguistic variation within Wenzhou is striking, with speech changing markedly from village to village. Several mutually unintelligible varieties are spoken across the municipality. The most widely used is Wenzhounese, which is spoken across all counties and districts and has the broadest reach. Hokkien is spoken mainly in southern Wenzhou, especially in Cangnan and Pingyang, and is close to the Hokkien spoken in southern Fujian. In Yueqing, the Dajing dialect is spoken north of the Qingjiang River, while areas to the south are predominantly Wenzhounese-speaking. Taishun has six additional mutually unintelligible varieties alongside Wenzhounese, including Manjiang, Hokkien, Luoyang, Jujiang, She, and Tingzhou dialects. In Cangnan, in addition to Wenzhounese and Hokkien, Manhua, She, and Jinxiang dialects are also spoken.

Wenzhounese is widely regarded as particularly hard for outsiders to understand. With mountains on three sides and the sea on the fourth, Wenzhou was historically relatively isolated, which helped preserve a number of archaic features in local languages. Wenzhounese is often noted for retaining features associated with earlier stages of Chinese, such as Middle Chinese, and is sometimes described in the literature as unusually conservative compared with many other modern varieties. Its development is traced back to the late Han and Eastern Wu periods, becoming recognisable by the Tang dynasty and reaching maturity by the Northern Song; by the Southern Song it is considered broadly close to modern usage. Continuities are often illustrated through early sources that record vernacular words and pronunciations, as well as the colloquial language found in Southern Drama texts.

=== Education ===
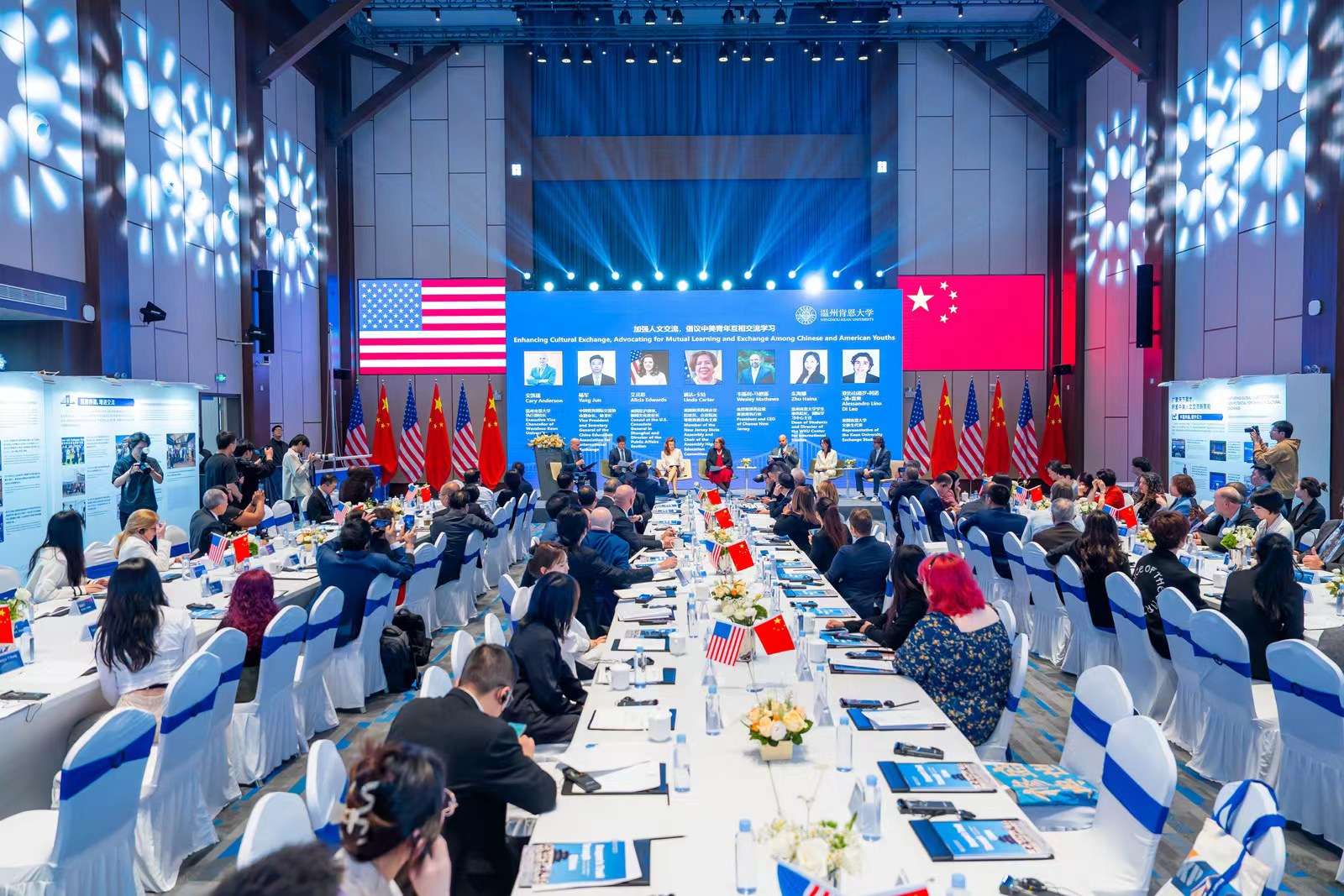
Tenth anniversary celebration of Wenzhou-Kean University

Education in Wenzhou has a long institutional history dating to 301, when the first prefectural school was established. In the late Qing, modern education began to take shape. In 1885, Chen Qiu founded Liji School in Rui’an, regarded as China’s first modern school of traditional Chinese medicine. Sun Yirang subsequently established a range of specialised institutions, including schools of mathematics, accounting, and sericulture.

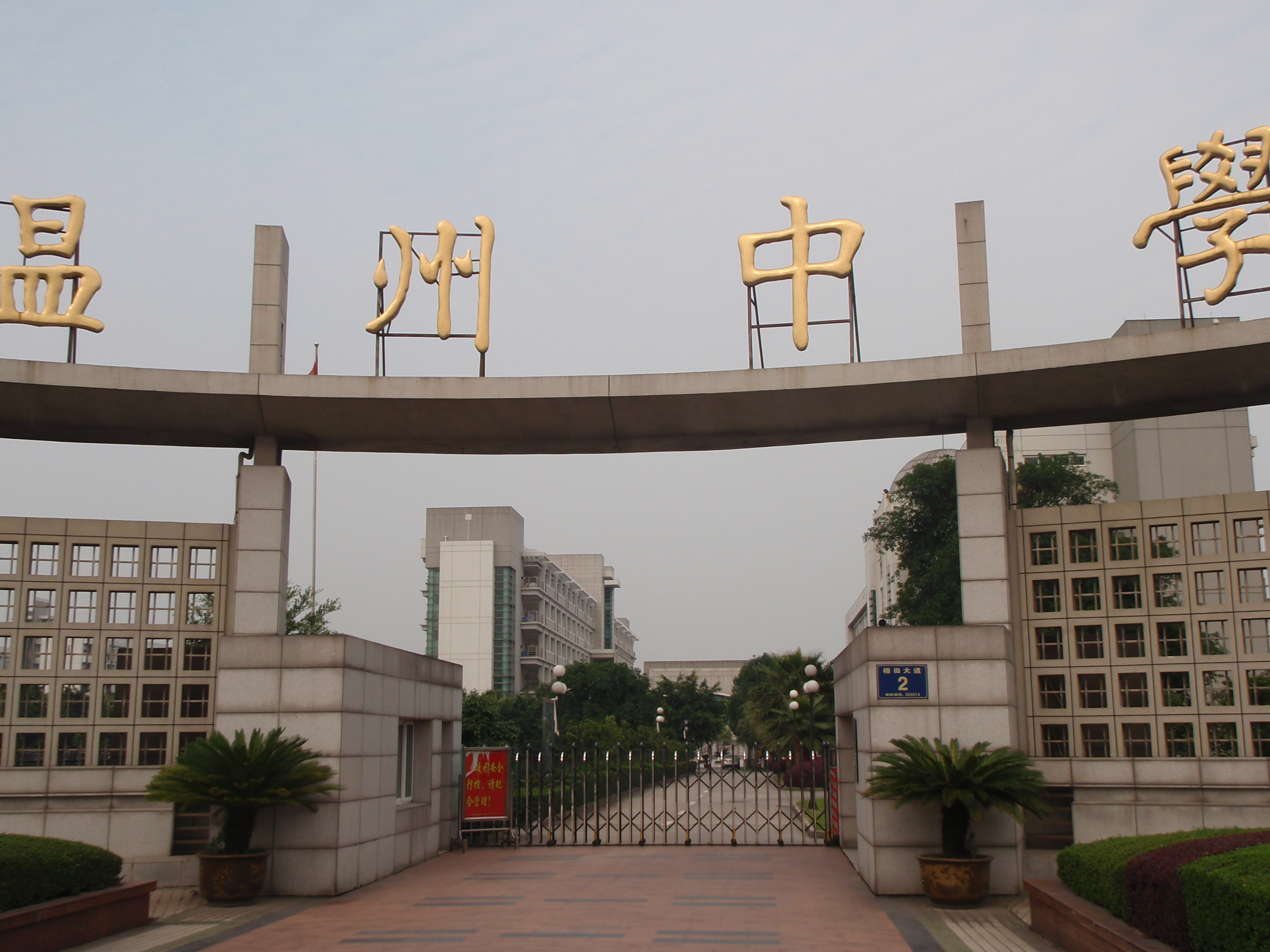
Wenzhou High School

Educational development in Wenzhou accelerated from the 1980s onwards. In December 1984, the Zhejiang provincial government approved the formal establishment of Wenzhou University, whose construction was funded through a combination of government spending, public fundraising, and donations from overseas Chinese. In 2006, Wenzhou University signed an agreement with Kean University in the United States to establish Wenzhou-Kean University, which was formally approved in 2014. Wenzhou is currently home to higher education institutions such as Wenzhou University and Wenzhou Medical University, though the city’s overall ability to attract and retain high-level talent remains limited.

According to the 2020 Chinese census, by the end of 2020, Wenzhou had 1,209,696 residents with tertiary education qualifications, 1,381,490 with upper secondary education, 3,044,455 with lower secondary education, and 2,805,725 with primary education. The illiteracy rate stood at 4.65%.

=== Diasporas ===
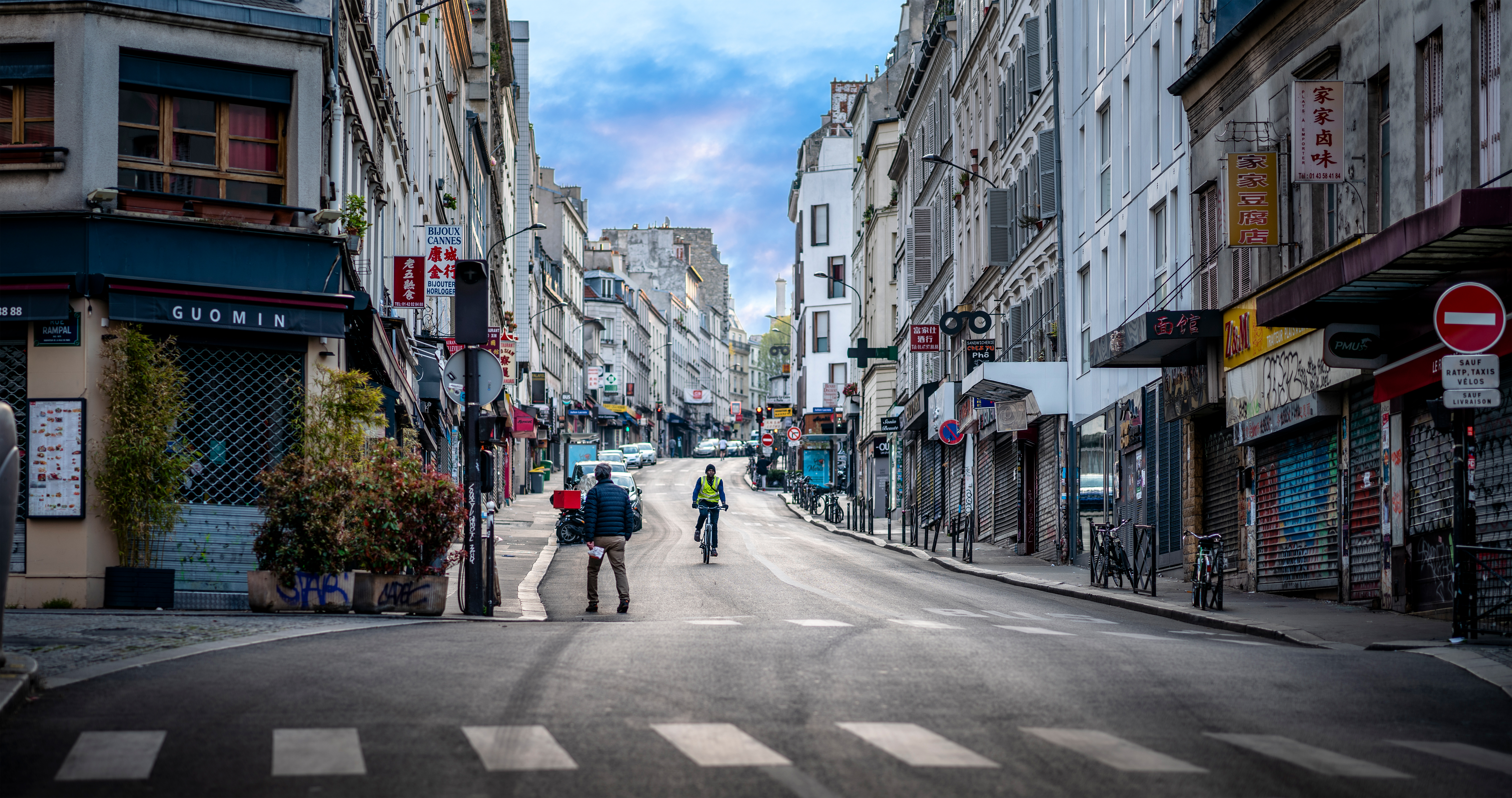
Since the 1990s, Belleville in Paris has been one of the main centres of settlement for overseas Wenzhou people

Since the 1990s, large-scale migration from Wenzhou to other parts of China and overseas has turned the city into a major origin of overseas Chinese in China. By 2025, more than 2 million people of Wenzhou origin were living worldwide, including over 800,000 overseas, spread across more than 100 countries. Together they had established more than 200 chambers of commerce outside Wenzhou and over 300 overseas Chinese associations, forming an extensive global network of businesses and communities associated with Wenzhou people. Qingtian County in Lishui, which neighbours Wenzhou and whose local language is closely related to that of Wenzhou, is often grouped together overseas, with people frequently identifying themselves as “Wenzhou people”. Wenzhou people make up a large proportion of the Chinese residents in Italy, constituting approximately 90% of Tuscany's Chinese population. Significant concentrations of Wenzhounese also live in New York City, as well as across France and Spain.

== Religion ==
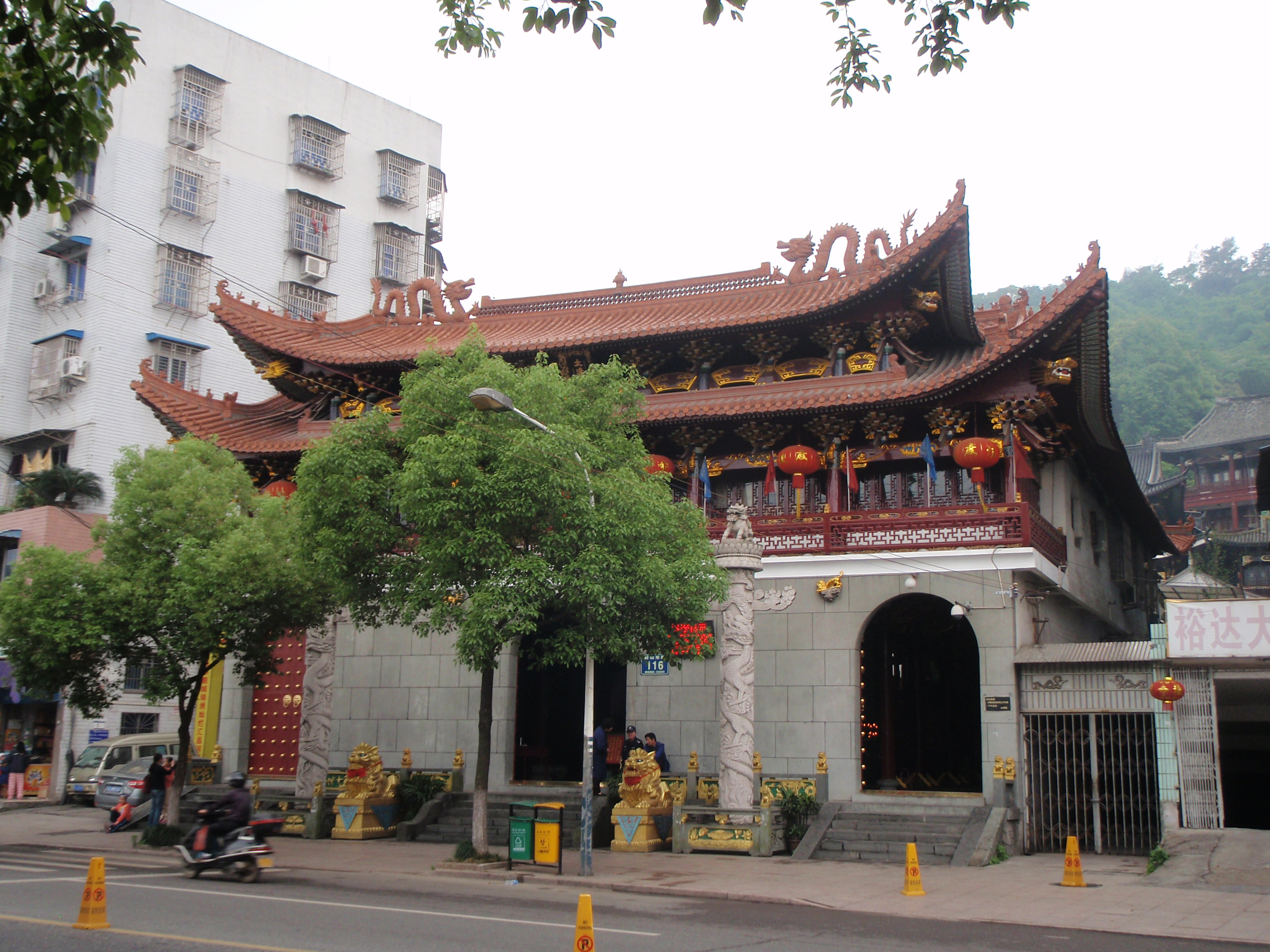
Temple of Bao Gong in Ouhai District.

Wenzhou is often described as having one of the highest proportions of religious believers in China, with Buddhism as the largest religion locally. Traditional religious practice in Wenzhou has also been notably elaborate. Local gazetteers record that, from the time of the Dong’ou ruler Yao, local custom placed strong emphasis on spirits and temple worship. In the Yongjia walled city, there were said to be more than ninety temples and over twenty monasteries. In ordinary households, people commonly venerated a set of domestic deities, such as the kitchen god, eaves god, well god, god of wealth, white tiger god, and earth god, while also worshipping Guanyin, the Three Officials, and other gods.

Prior to 1949, there were 2,000 registered places of worship and 4,500 priests, pastors and monks in the city. But, the state officially designated Wenzhou as an experimental site for an "atheistic zone" in 1958 and during the Cultural Revolution (1966–1976), religious buildings were either closed or converted for other uses. Religion revived quickly since the 1980s, and today there are more registered places of worship than before. Specifically, as of 2015 the city has 8,569 registered folk religious temples and 3,961 registered places of worship of the five institutional religions (Buddhism, Taoism, Islam, Catholicism and Protestantism). The city was the forefront in the registration and management of folk religious temples which was started in January 2015 and later extended to all Zhejiang.

=== Folk religion ===
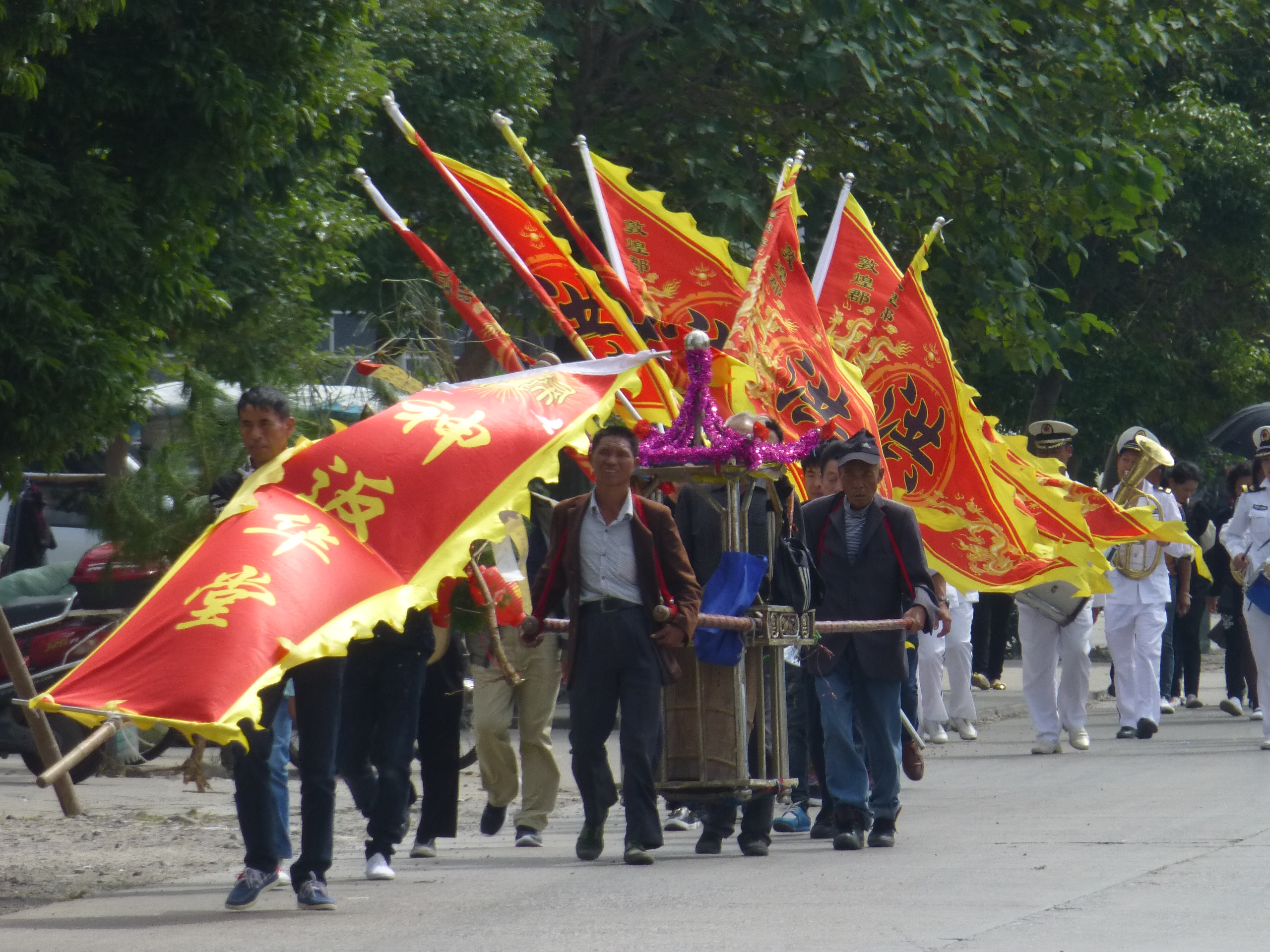
Scene of a funeral in Longgang

Local religious life has long centred on a rich mix of deity worship, ancestral veneration, and everyday ritual practice. Among the most prominent figures in local belief is Yao, the ancient ruler of Dong’ou, who is commonly honoured alongside the City God in rites concerned with protection, rainmaking, and communal well-being. The earth god and the god of wealth also attract widespread devotion, while a wide range of more specialised deities reflects the practical concerns of daily life. Historical and legendary figures have frequently been incorporated into this religious landscape, and local traditions also include forms of animal and nature worship, such as auspicious white deer imagery and tiger spirits.

Ancestral veneration has been equally important. Families place strong emphasis on remembering and honouring the dead, with regular rites held on festivals as well as on the birthdays and death anniversaries of ancestors. In wealthier households, portraits commissioned during a person's lifetime were sometimes displayed after death as part of domestic ritual practice. Alongside these beliefs, a dense set of everyday taboos has shaped social behaviour, from table etiquette and forms of speech to attitudes towards numbers, animals, and written text, embedding religious sensibilities deeply into ordinary life.

=== Buddhism ===
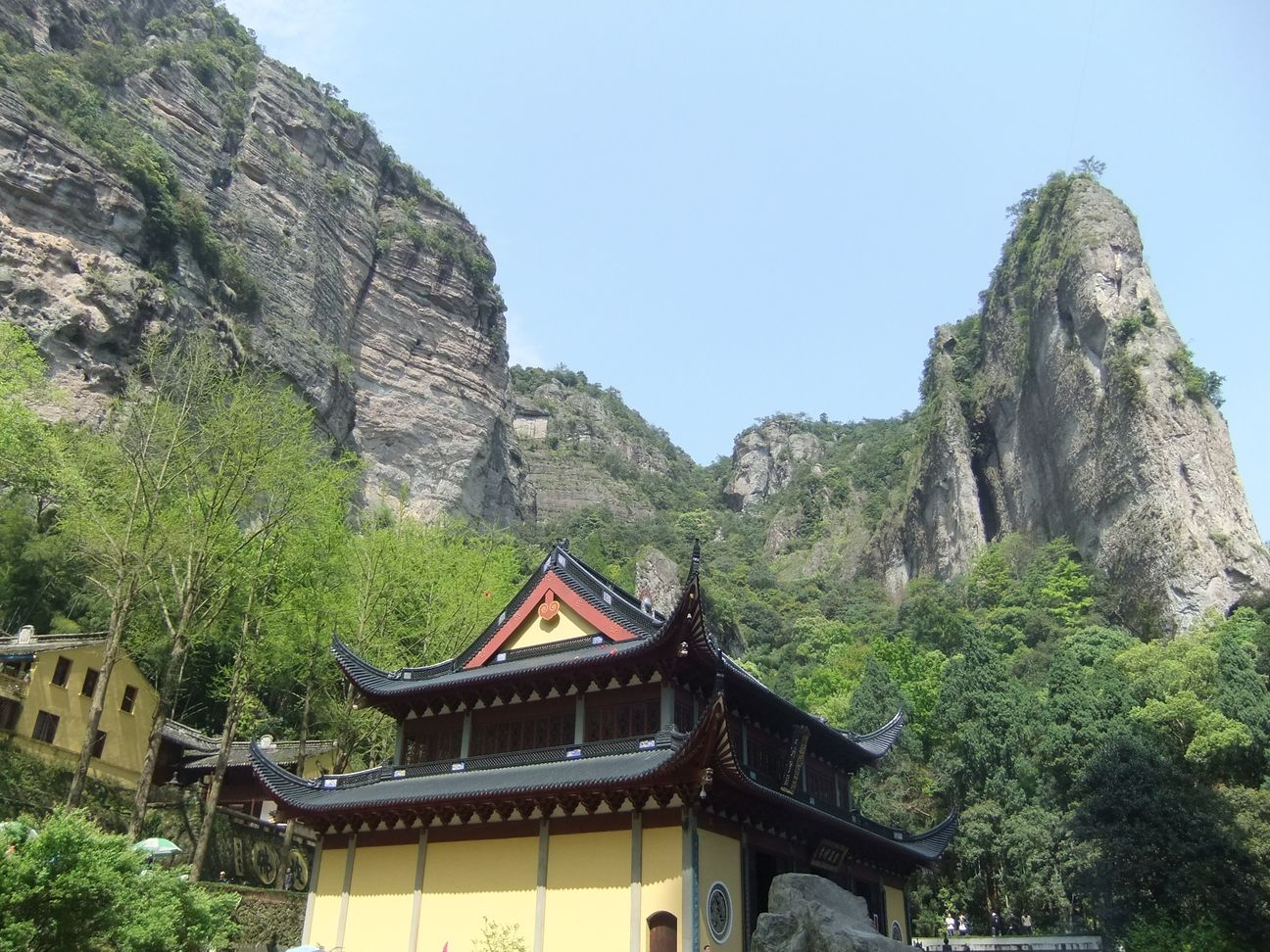
Lingyan Temple on Yandang Mountain

Buddhism has been present in Wenzhou since the Jin dynasty. In 295, a Buddhist pagoda was erected on Luofu Mountain in Yongjia; from the Southern Dynasties through the Sui and Tang periods, monasteries gradually became more numerous. Over time, Tiantai and Chan traditions developed side by side, and in the modern era eminent monks such as Dixian and Hongyi were active in Wenzhou in rebuilding temples and establishing lecture halls and Buddhist academies.

Among local temples, Jiangxin Temple in Lucheng is the most emblematic. It was given the imprial grant of the name “Longxiang Xingqing Chan Temple” in the Song dynasty and was listed in 1983 as a nationally designated key temple open to the public. Other locally significant historic temples include Miaoguo Temple on Songtai Hill in Lucheng, Miyin Temple on Toutuo Mountain in Ouhai, Lingyan Temple on Yandang Mountain in Yueqing, Xianyan Shengshou Chan Temple in Rui’an, and Guoan Temple and the Qianfo Pagoda in Yaoxi, Longwan.

=== Daoism ===
Daoist activity in Wenzhou can be traced back to the Three Kingdoms period. Local tradition holds that, in the Jin dynasty, the alchemist Ge Hong travelled to sites such as Dongmeng Mountain in Yongjia and Dongmen in Kunyang to practise alchemy. Daoism flourished at times during the Song and Yuan periods, when numerous temples were established and prominent figures emerged. In the Song, the Shenxiao tradition was particularly influential: Lin Lingsu of Yongjia is said to have travelled to the imperial capital to transmit Shenxiao texts and rites, gaining considerable prominence. In the Yuan, the Donghua tradition became notable; Lin Ling-zhen, a native of Lin’ao in Pingyang, promoted Donghua teachings in the early Yuan, and his followers were known as the Shuinan lineage, which later gradually merged into Zhengyi Dao. Since the Ming and Qing periods, Daoist lineages in Wenzhou have increasingly consolidated into the two main systems of Quanzhen and Zhengyi.

Wenzhou’s Daoist temples have undergone repeated cycles of rise and decline since the opening of rock-cut chambers at Daluoyan in Yongjia. Among the best-known surviving sites is the Zixiao Temple at Jingshan Jingshuigu in Ouhai. Tao Gong Cave at Daluoyan in Yongjia is recognised as the twelfth “Blessed Grotto-Heaven” in Daoist geography. From the Tang dynasty onwards, it hosted temples such as Jizhen Temple and Guangfu Lingzhen Palace; many of the existing buildings were rebuilt during the Qianlong reign of the Qing dynasty.

=== Christianity ===
Wenzhou is also frequently noted for having one of the highest proportions of Christians in China. The city has been for centuries a hub of Christian missionary activity; prior to 1949 it was home to 115,000 Christians, more than one-tenth of the total Christians in China at that time. More than 10% and over a million of the city's residents are Christian. It has consequently acquired the nickname “China’s Jerusalem”, and is associated with a group sometimes described as “boss Christians”, who combine strong religious commitment with active involvement in business.

Recent reporting has described controversial government actions affecting Wenzhou’s Christian community, including church demolitions and large-scale cross removals beginning in 2014, which officials have framed as enforcement of land-use rules, but which journalists and human-rights groups have argued were aimed at reducing Christianity’s public visibility; the campaign has also prompted local resistance, including the jailing of a pastor in 2015 after protests.

==== Protestantism ====
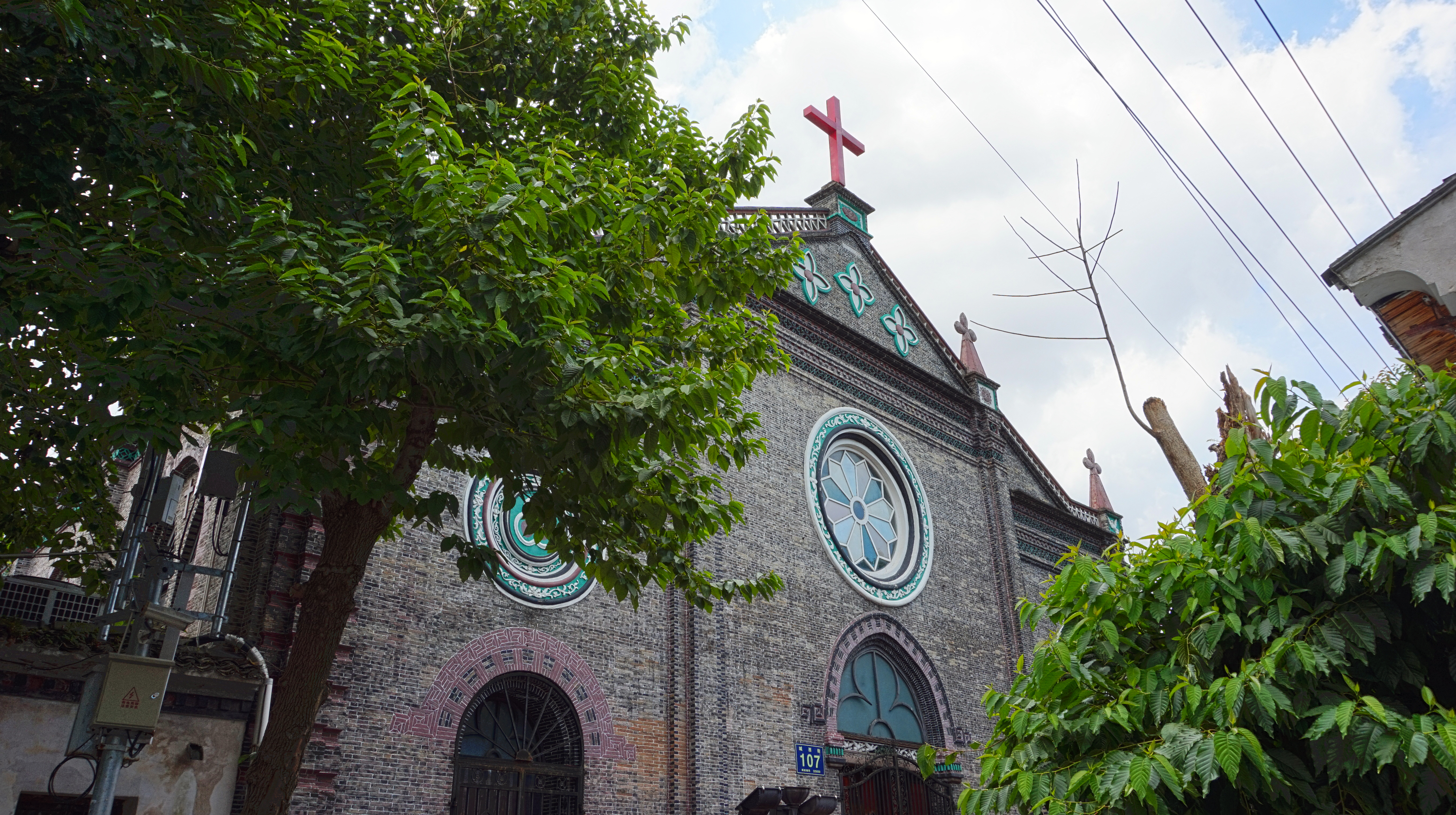
Chengxi Church

Protestant Christianity was introduced to Wenzhou in 1866 and gradually developed into six main traditions, including the China Inland Mission, the Methodist Church, the China Christian Independent Church, the Seventh-day Adventist Church, the Wenzhou Chinese Christian Independent Church, and the Christian Assembly. In 1950, local believers responded to the call for churches to be self-governing, self-supporting, and self-propagating. A Three-Self Patriotic Movement committee was established in 1956, and in 1958 the six traditions were merged, with denominational names discontinued. Church activities were suspended during the Cultural Revolution, resumed in 1979, and in 1983 the Wenzhou Christian Association was established.

Several Protestant churches are particularly representative in contemporary Wenzhou, including Garden Lane Church, Chengxi Church which now serves as the main church of the municipal Christian organisations, Hongqiao Church, Yahou Church in Rui’an, Yongping Church in Aojiang, Yongling Church in Cangnan, and Zhuyintang Church in Longgang.

Protestantism in Wenzhou was also historically active in education and healthcare. In 1897, Dingley Hospital was founded as the city’s first Western-style hospital. In 1905 it was incorporated into Whiteley Hospital, and in 1953 it was taken over by the government, becoming what is now Wenzhou Central Hospital.

==== Catholicism ====
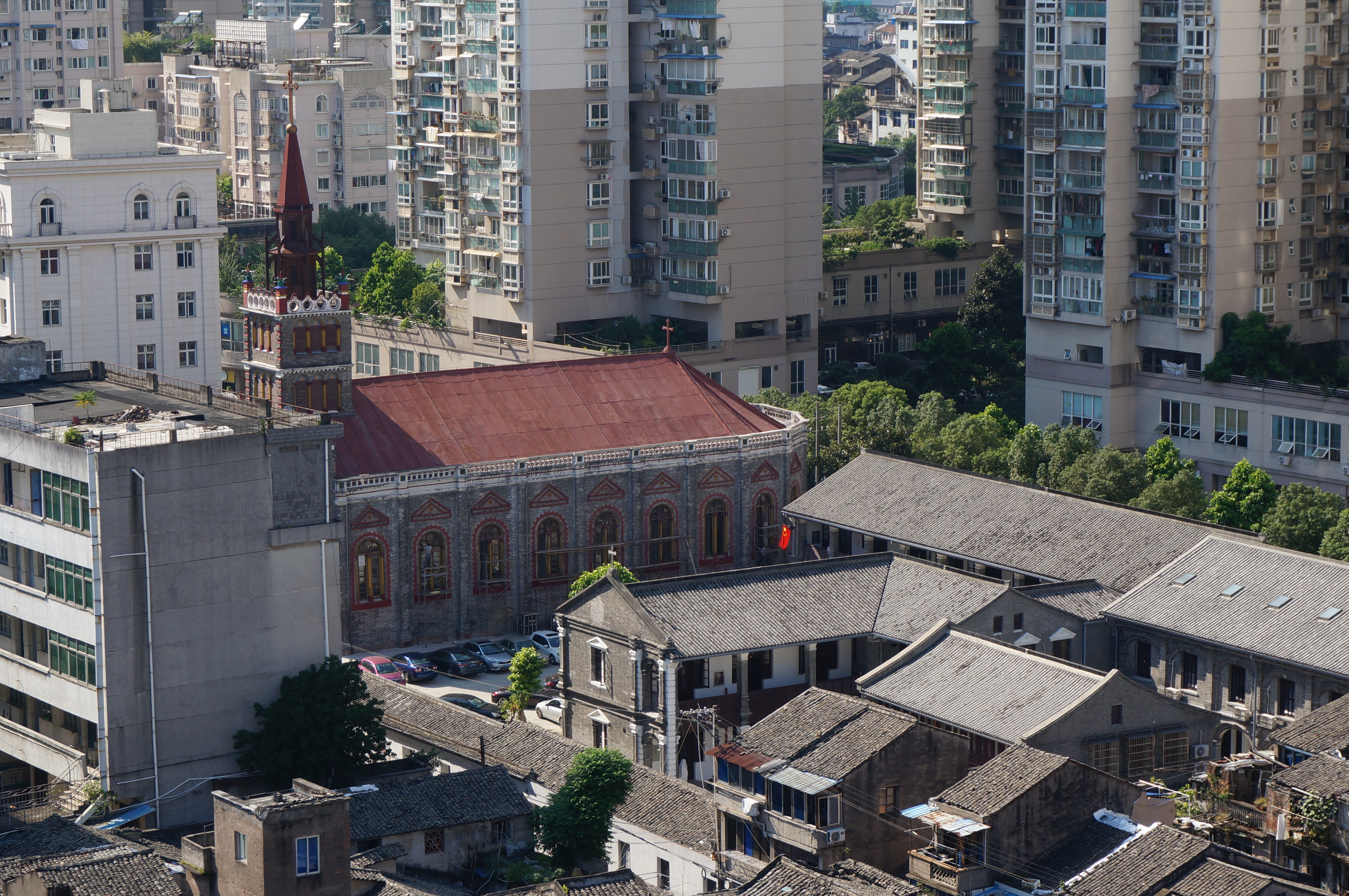
St. Paul's Cathedral

Wenzhou’s Roman Catholic tradition is linked in local accounts to earlier forms of Christianity dating back to 1304. Modern missionary activity resumed after 1846 as the Vincentians expanded their work in Zhejiang. After the founding of the People’s Republic of China, church administration in Wenzhou was reorganised under the Wenzhou Catholic Patriotic Association.

Wenzhou is reported to have around 100,000 Catholic believers, accounting for roughly 70% of Zhejiang’s total. Besides Zhouzhai Cixiang Catholic Church, other major churches include Yongqiang Catholic Church, Fenglin Catholic Church in Yongjia, Hongqiao Catholic Church in Yueqing, Chengguan Catholic Church in Rui’an, Kunyang Catholic Church in Pingyang, Qianku Catholic Church in Cangnan, and Hedigao Catholic Church in Longgang, many of which were first built during the Republican period.

The Catholic Church in Wenzhou also ran schools and medical services. In 1913, the John de God infirmary began offering clinical services and later became known as the John de God Hospital. In 1951, it was taken over by the municipal government and became today’s Wenzhou People’s Hospital.

== Culture ==
=== Literary tradition ===
Literary activity in Wenzhou can be traced back to poetry of the Northern and Southern Dynasties. During the Eastern Jin, Xie Lingyun served as prefect of Yongjia and, inspired by the local landscape, helped pioneer the tradition of Chinese landscape poetry.

The Yongjia School, which emerged from Wenzhou, was one of the most important Confucian schools of thought of the Southern Song period. It developed alongside, and in debate with, other major strands of thought associated with Zhu Xi and Lu Jiuyuan. The school is best known for its stress on practical statecraft and real-world results, arguing that material benefit and moral principle could be aligned rather than treated as opposites. Its thinkers maintained that advantage should be pursued within an ethical framework, and criticised moral philosophy that, in their view, became detached from social and economic realities. Ye Shi is generally regarded as the leading figure and the most fully developed representative of the school. Because Wenzhou produced a notable number of scholars in the Southern Song, it acquired a reputation as a major cultural and intellectual centre in southeast China.

Yongjia School is arguably the only major Chinese school of thought of which the main teachings emphasise currency, commerce, and private economy, which has a strong influence on Wenzhou people. Wenzhou people are often thought to be equipped with business sense and a commercial culture more dominant than anywhere else in China. In 2009, the Chinese Academy of Social Sciences ranked Wenzhou as China’s most culturally competitive city, sparking wider discussion of what was often characterised as the Wenzhou capacity for recognising commercial opportunities and willingness to seek livelihoods beyond the local area. Entrepreneurship and business life associated with Wenzhou people have become a recurring theme in film and television. The most prominent example is the TV drama series Family on the Go, which attracted national attention. China Daily also notes that investments from Wenzhounese buyers play a disproportionately large role in the increased property prices all over China.

=== Performing arts ===
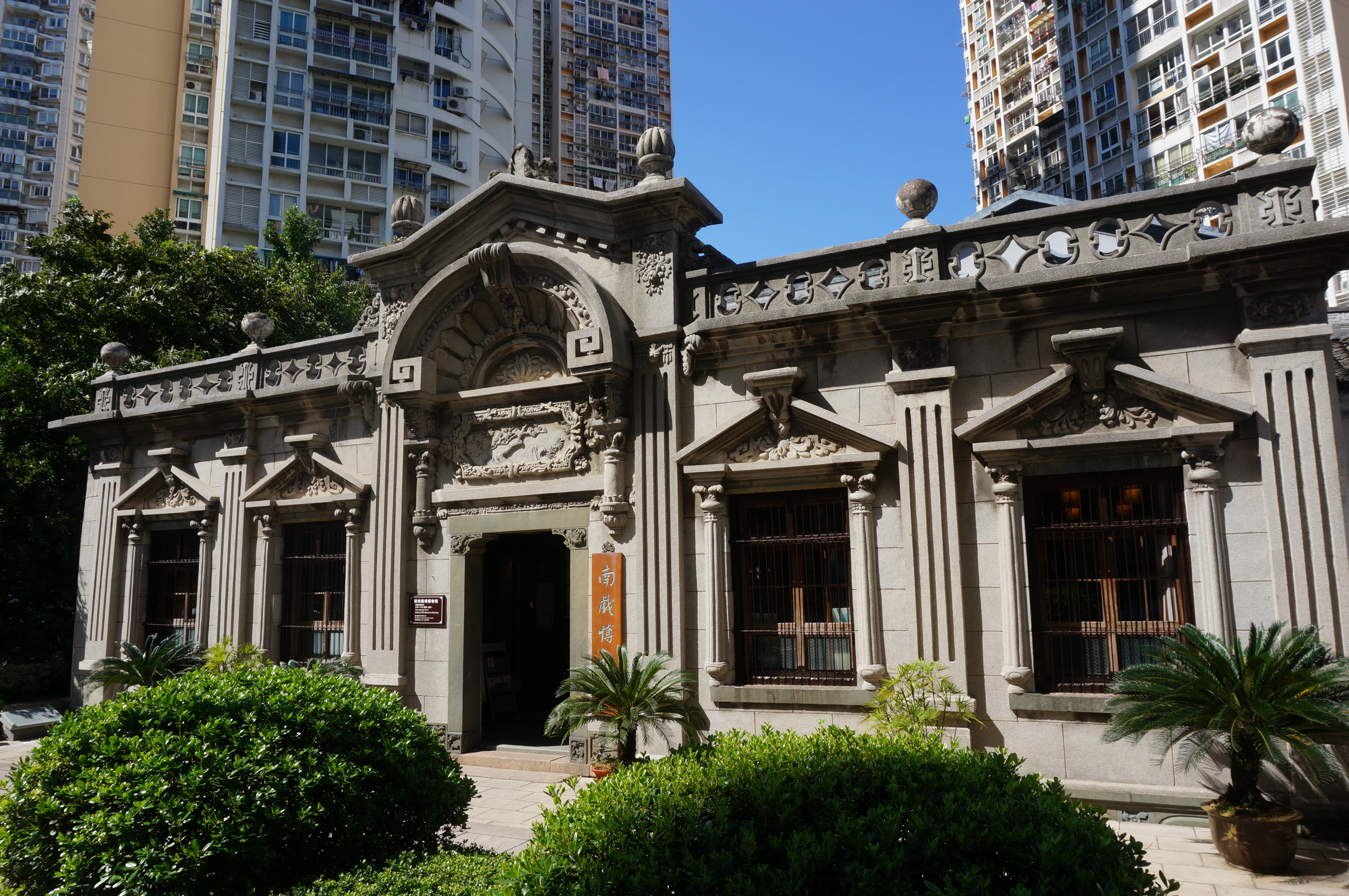
Former site of Yikang Qianzhuang in Wenzhou, now the Nanxi Museum

The Book of Sui records that Yongjia “favoured singing and dancing”. Nanxi, or the southern drama, is often described as one of the earliest forms of Chinese theatre. It originated in Wenzhou from the late Northern Song through the Yuan period and into the early Ming, and was especially influential across southern China. Because it was performed with singing and dance, using southern melodies (nanqu), it became known as the southern drama (nanxi). In the Ming and Qing periods, dance and music likewise remained popular. After a decline during the Republican era, these traditions revived after 1949 alongside the development of organised music and performance. In addition to Nanxi, Kunqu, Gaoqiang, Ou opera, Peking opera and glove puppetry were also popular in Wenzhou.

=== Cuisine ===
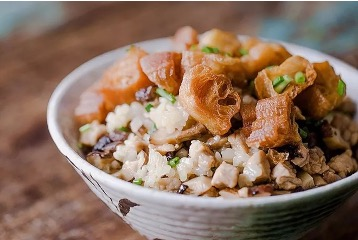
Wenzhou glutinous rice

Wenzhou cuisine forms a distinct branch within Zhejiang cuisine. Its overall character can be summarised as seafood-centred, light in flavour, and focused on preserving the natural taste of ingredients. Benefiting from abundant coastal resources, fish, shellfish, and other seafood feature prominently in everyday cooking. Common techniques include steaming, blanching, quick stir-frying, and light thickening, all of which emphasise freshness, tenderness, and balance rather than heavy seasoning or strong spices. In coastal areas, traditional practices of eating raw or lightly cured seafood have been preserved. These are often paired with pickled vegetables, which help balance flavour and texture and reflect long-standing local food customs shaped by maritime life.

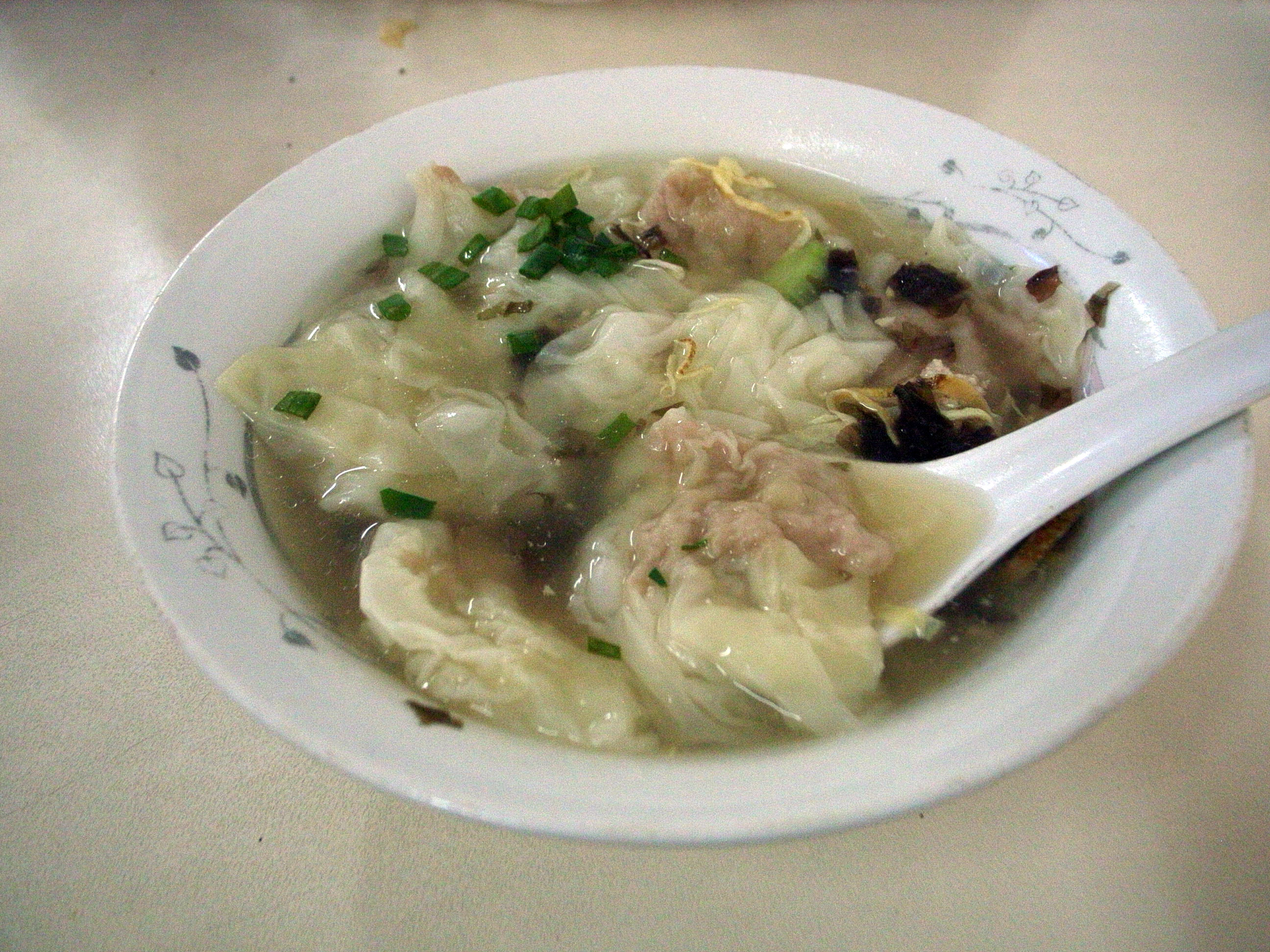
Wenzhou wontons

Wenzhou also has a highly developed tradition of local snacks, characterised by a wide variety of items, strong street-food culture, and clear regional identity. These range from rice- and wheat-based staple snacks to sweets and soups, generally favouring soft, chewy textures and a balance of savoury and sweet flavours, with an emphasis on freshly prepared food.

=== Handcrafts ===
Wenzhou’s folk crafts are closely tied to both everyday life and religious or festive traditions, and many local forms later developed into recognised fine and decorative arts with wider markets. Several traditions originated as practical or ceremonial embellishments, such as decorations for lantern festivals, temples, household furnishings, and clothing, before being refined by specialist artisans and adapted into collectible, display-oriented works.

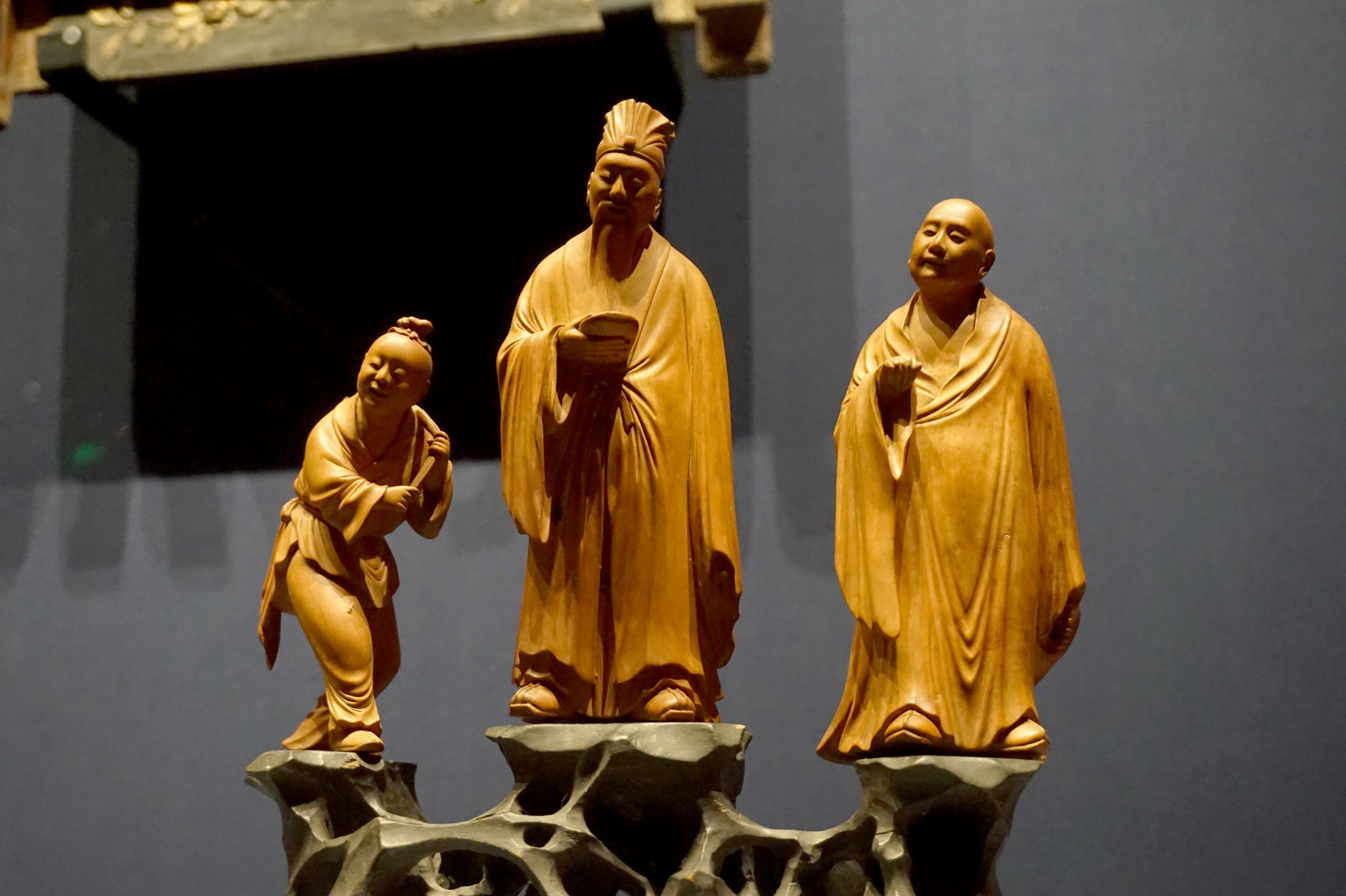
Dongpo Admiring an Inkstone, a Qing-dynasty boxwood carving by Zhu Zichang, in the collection of the Wenzhou Museum

A distinctive feature of Wenzhou craftsmanship is its strong material and technique basis. Woodcarving, especially the Yueqing tradition of boxwood carving, evolved from festival ornamentation into an independent art form in the late Qing, gaining broader recognition through awards at major exhibitions in the early 12th century. Modelling in oil-based clay, traditionally used for temple decoration, was later reworked into decorative screens and hanging pieces. Textile arts also became important: local embroidery developed into one of China’s major embroidery traditions, expanding from workshop production to export-oriented craft industries by the late Qing and Republican periods, and later benefiting from more organised production after 1949. Rural needlework traditions, including cross-stitch lacework, were valued for their delicacy and became notable export items.

Stone-based crafts form another strand. Local stone carving, related to the wider tradition of Qingtian stone carving, combined practical uses, such as seals and ritual or decorative objects, with architectural ornamentation. Inlay work became a hallmark, particularly colour-stone inlay set into hardwood, which connected carving with furniture and decorative objects and reached overseas markets; bamboo-filament inlay later emerged as a distinctive local technique and was revived in the mid-12th century. Finally, the fine-cut paper-cutting tradition of Yueqing developed from festive and household decoration into a highly detailed craft used for patterns and ornamental motifs.

=== Festival customs ===
Seasonal customs in Wenzhou traditionally followed the rhythm of the year. The calendar opened in the first lunar month with lantern displays and New Year visits. In the second and third months, spring was welcomed through outdoor games and activities such as kite flying and playing simple wind instruments made from wheat stalks. During spring, the city also observed Lan Jie Fu, a rotating street-based ritual held from the first day of the second lunar month to the fifteenth day of the third, with different neighbourhoods taking turns to host festivities. Early summer was marked most prominently by the Dragon Boat Festival, which extended beyond the day itself to include dragon boat racing and processional performances. In autumn, attention shifted to the Qixi festival and Mid-Autumn moon viewing. Winter customs centred on preparing for the cold season, making New Year rice cakes at year’s end, staying up on New Year’s Eve, and giving lucky money. Since 1949, some of these practices have gradually declined or continued in modified forms.

=== Sports ===
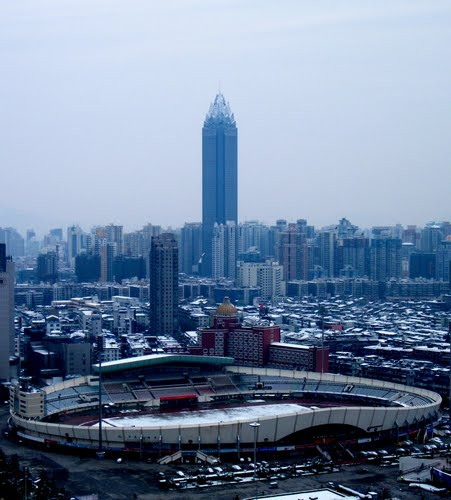
Wenzhou Sports Centre after snowfall, with the Wenzhou World Trade Centre in the background

Since 1983, Wenzhou has been designated the “Home of Swimming” by the General Administration of Sport of China. According to statistics from the Wenzhou Municipal Sports Bureau, as of August 2024, athletes from Wenzhou had won a total of 5 Olympic gold medals, 92 world titles including Olympic titles, 51 Asian Games titles, and 69 National Games titles, with 40 athletes currently training or selected for national teams, many of them in swimming, including Xu Jiayu, Li Zhuhao, Liu Yaxin and Pan Zhanle.

In 1995, Wenzhou was designated the “City of Chess” by China Qiyuan, the national body overseeing board and card games in mainland China. In 2020, the city marked the 25th anniversary of the title. To mark the occasion, FIDE President Arkady Dvorkovich sent a congratulatory letter praising Wenzhou for producing outstanding players such as Ye Rongguang, Zhu Chen, and Ding Liren.

==== Major venues ====
- Wenzhou Sports Centre: The complex covers more than 200 mu, with a total floor area of 70,319 square metres and an investment of 280 million yuan. Its main facilities include an indoor arena with 5,000 seats, a swimming and diving hall with 2,000 seats, and a stadium with a capacity of 20,000. Construction of the arena began on 8 November 1994 and was completed on 8 December 1995, with a total build period of 395 days. The stadium, designed by the Wenzhou Architectural Design Institute, started construction on 8 June 1995 and was completed in July 1997.
- Wenzhou Olympic Sports Centre: Located at the foot of Daluo Mountain, south of the Longwan administrative centre, the complex includes a main stadium with a capacity of 50,000, a multi-purpose indoor arena seating 5,000, and a swimming venue with seating for around 1,000. It hosted football matches during the 2022 Asian Games.

=== Mathematics ===
Wenzhou has a long tradition of mathematical education. In 1896, the Wenzhou scholar Sun Yirang established what is described as China’s first institute dedicated to mathematics in Rui’an. In 1897, Huang Qingcheng founded China’s first periodical dedicated to mathematics in Wenzhou, and in 1899 Wenzhou saw the formation of an organised mathematics society, often cited as the country’s earliest regional mathematical association. Wenzhounese scholars subsequently played an outsized role in the rise of modern mathematics in China. Over the 20th century, the city produced more than 200 mathematicians of national and international standing, including Jiang Lifu, Su Buqing, Jiang Boju, Shu Shien-Siu and Lee Peng Yee. In 2003, during a visit to Wenzhou at the invitation of Gu Chaohao, Shiing-Shen Chern openly praised the city as a “Home of Mathematicians”.

== Transport ==
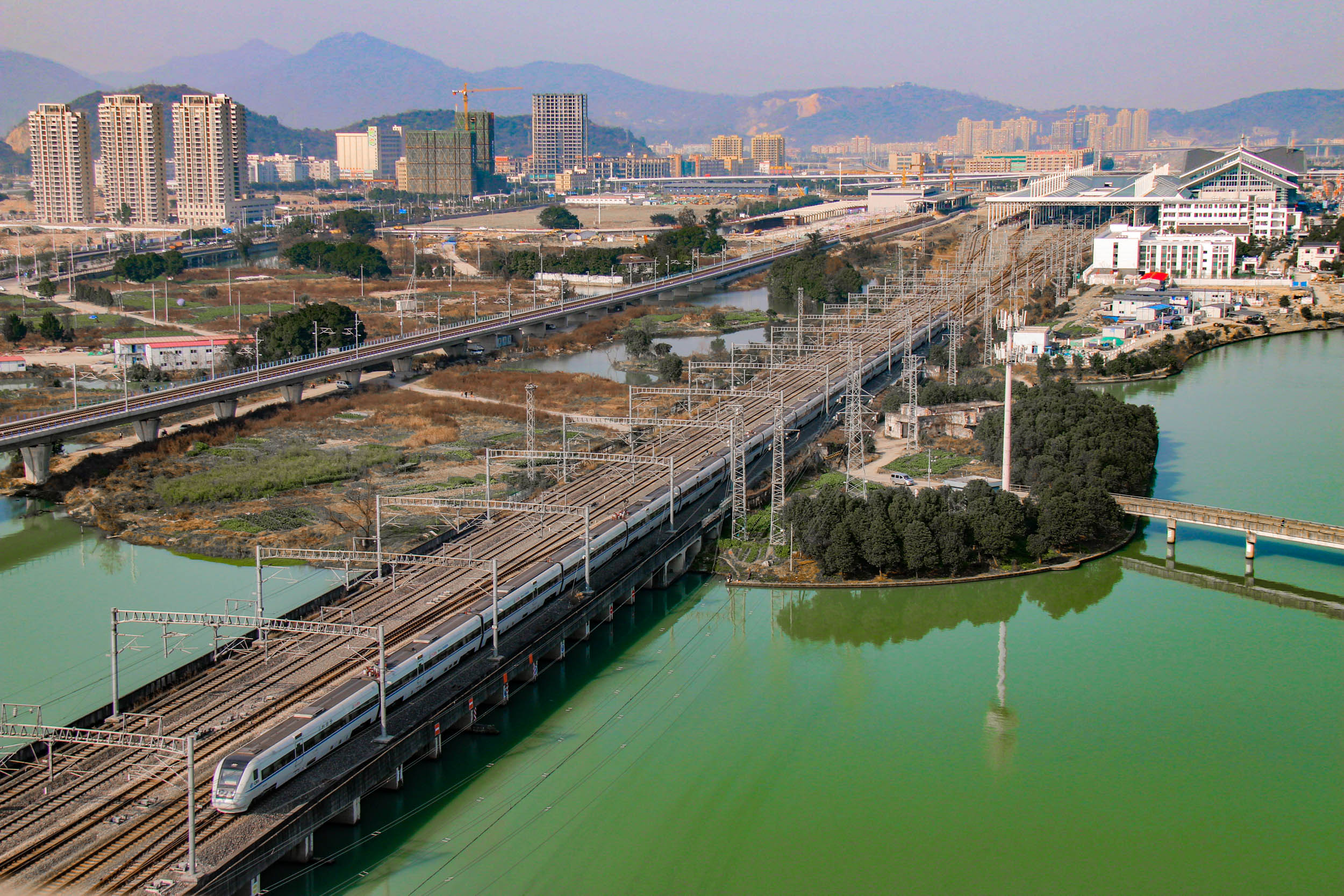
A high-speed train passing the Hangzhou–Shenzhen Railway near Wenzhounan railway station

Historically, Wenzhou was one of the most remote and poorly connected cities in Zhejiang, being the farthest from the provincial capital, Hangzhou. In earlier times, travelling overland from Wenzhou to Hangzhou often took at least two weeks, although transport conditions improved gradually in the modern era. From the 1990s onwards, the opening of the airport, railway links, and expressways progressively strengthened the transport network, while water transport gradually declined.

=== Air ===
A stop on the Shanghai–Guangzhou route operated by China National Aviation Corporation from 1932, Wenzhou was the first city in Zhejiang to establish air transport links, until the route and the airfield was destroyed during the Second Sino-Japanese War. In 1984, Wenzhou was designated by the State Council as one of China’s 14 coastal open cities, which gave rise to plans for airport construction. With total investment of 132 million yuan, including more than 60 million yuan raised from the public, Wenzhou Airport was China’s first airport built primarily through locally raised funds. Construction began in May 1987, and the airport opened on 12 July 1990. In 1991, Wang Junyao contracted the Changsha–Wenzhou route, pioneering privately operated charter services in China’s civil aviation sector. The airport has since undergone repeated expansion and upgrading, with a rail transit station within the airport built in 2019.

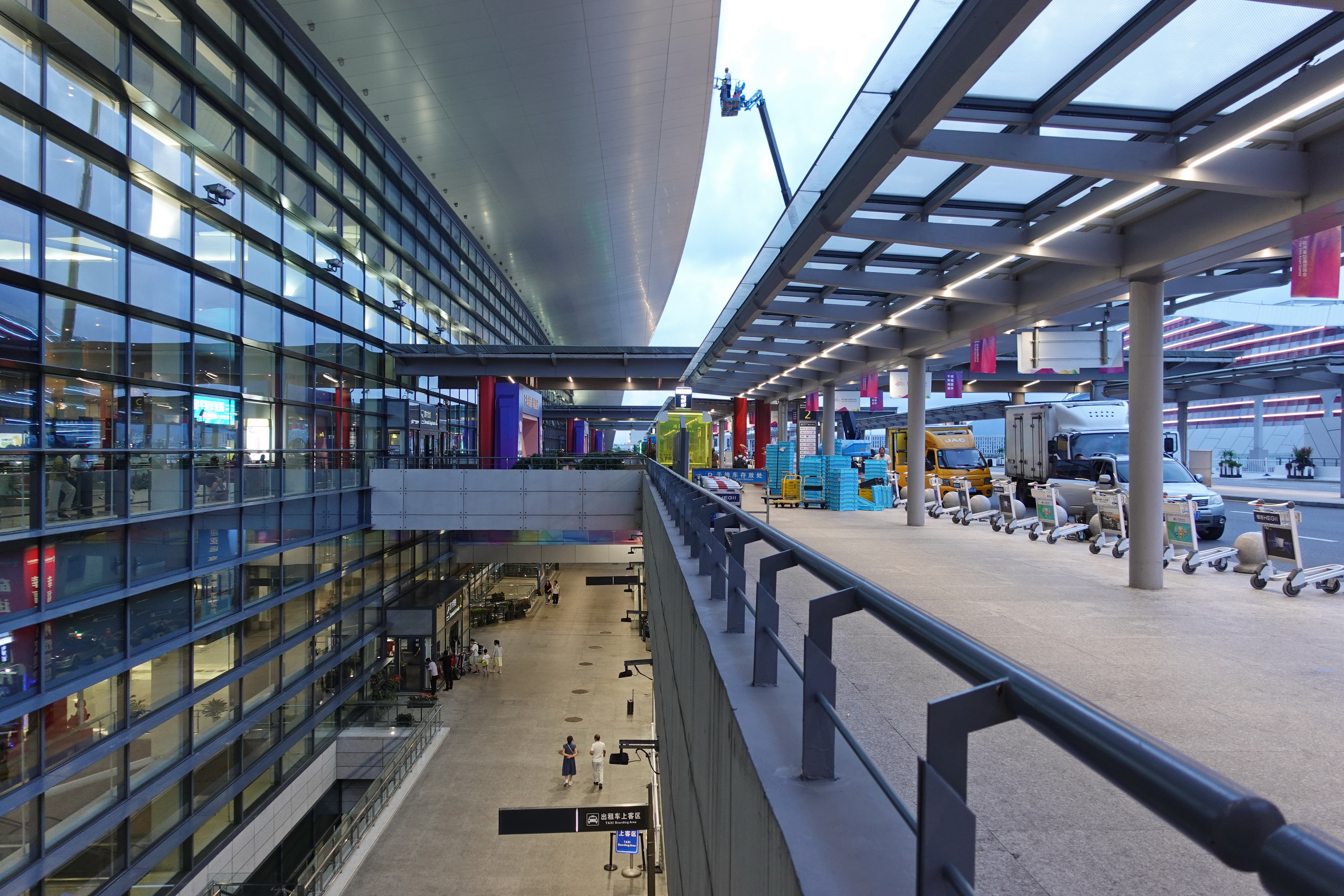
Terminal 2 of Wenzhou Longwan International Airport

As of 2025, the airport covered approximately 5,682 mu (378.8 ha or 936 acres) and was classified as a 4E airport. It operated a single runway 3,200 m (10,500 ft) long and 45 m (148 ft) wide, with 60 m (200 ft) shoulders, together with a parallel taxiway of the same length. Peak-hour capacity was 28 aircraft movements. The apron covered about 581,000 m^{2} (6,250,000 sq ft) and provided 66 parking stands and 29 passenger boarding bridges. The airport had two terminals, T1 and T2, with a combined floor area of around 156,000 m^{2} (1,680,000 sq ft). Terminal 1 primarily handled international and regional flights, with an annual capacity of about 500,000 passengers, while Terminal 2, at 116,000 m^{2} (1,250,000 sq ft), mainly served domestic routes and was designed for annual throughput of around 13 million passengers. A dedicated cargo terminal of roughly 30,000 m^{2} (320,000 sq ft) supported an annual cargo and mail capacity of up to 200,000 tonnes.

In 2024, the airport handled 12.53 million passengers and 123,000 tonnes of cargo and mail. From 2021 to 2025, it opened a cumulative total of 127 domestic passenger routes and newly launched or resumed 14 international routes. Among airports of comparable size in China, it was the only one to operate direct intercontinental services to Rome, Milan, and Madrid.

=== Rail ===
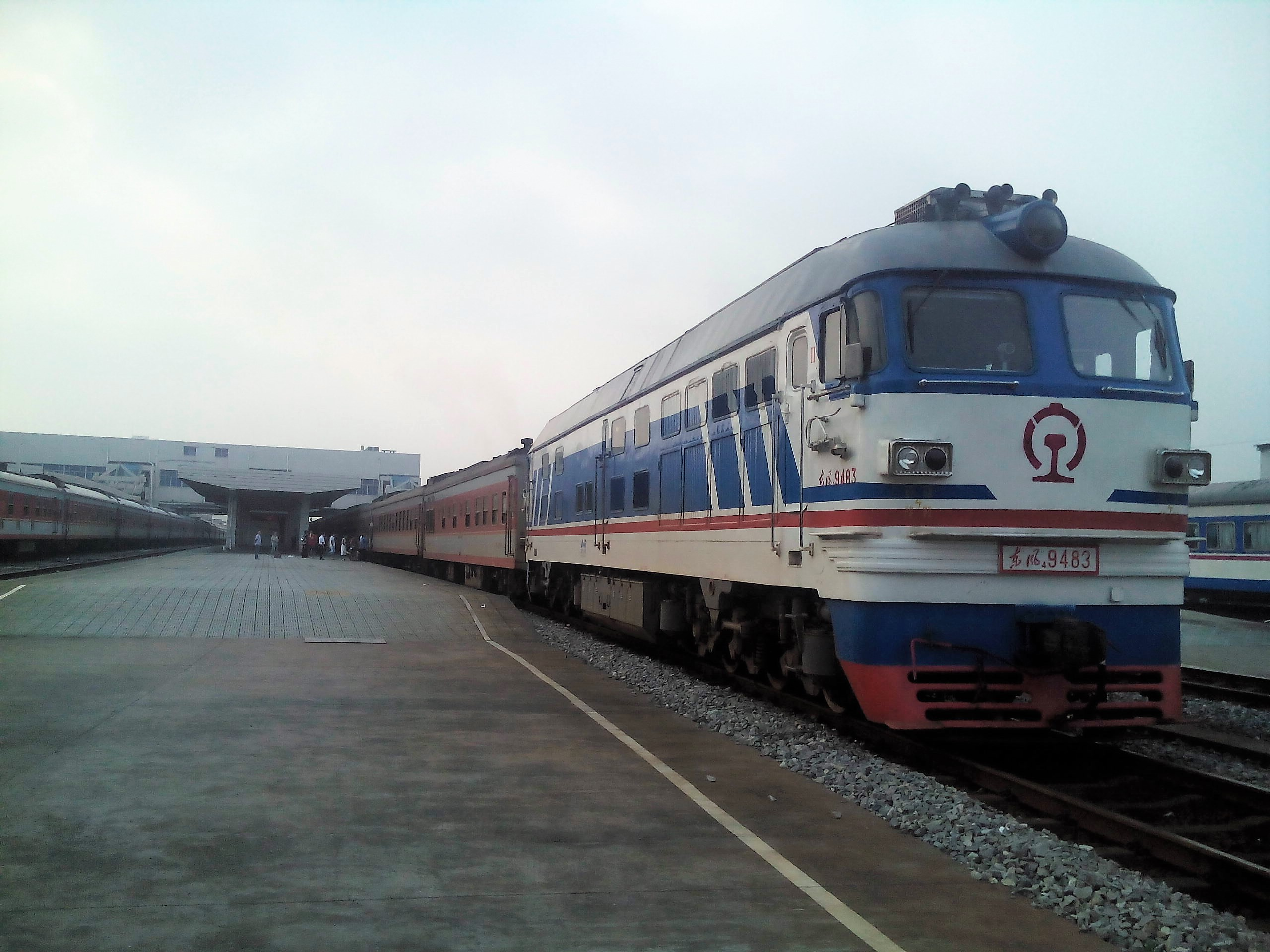
Rail service K2906 operated by the Jinwen Railway Corporation calling at Wenzhou railway station

Wenzhou’s modern railway links date to the early 1990s. The Jinhua–Wenzhou Railway was built through a public–private joint venture formed in 1992 between the Wenzhou municipal government and Nan Huaijin, a Wenzhou-born Taiwanese scholar, and opened in full on 11 June 1998, bringing railway service to southern Zhejiang for the first time. In September 2009, the Ningbo–Taizhou–Wenzhou and Wenzhou–Fuzhou railways opened, bringing high-speed services to Wenzhou for the first time. In 2015, the Jinhua–Wenzhou high-speed railway was opened. In 2024, the Hangzhou–Wenzhou high-speed railway entered service, introducing 350 km/h (220 mph) high-speed rail within the city and cutting the fastest journey to Hangzhou to about one hour.

==== Commuter rail ====
Map of Wenzhou Rail Transit

Wenzhou currently operates two commuter rail lines. Line S1 began construction on 11 November 2011, runs for 51.9 km, and entered service on 23 January 2019. Line S2 started construction on 30 December 2015 and opened on 26 August 2023. Line S3 broke ground on 27 March 2023 and is expected to open in the second half of 2027. In addition, three metro lines, M1, M2, and M3, have been proposed but have not yet received approval.

=== Roads ===
Wenzhou’s first external road link dates to October 1934, when the Wenzhou–Qingtian–Lishui road opened. For much of the 20th century, external connections still relied heavily on waterways, but from the 1990s the expanding road network gradually reduced the role of inland water transport. In May 1998, the Wenzhou Bridge opened, marking the first expressway-standard road infrastructure in the city. Wenzhou’s first full expressway route followed in 2003, when the Wenzhou section of the Ningbo–Taizhou–Wenzhou Expressway opened. In 2020, the opening of the Wencheng–Taishun Expressway helped complete expressway access across all county-level areas in Wenzhou and, more broadly, across Zhejiang. By 2025, Wenzhou had a total road length of 17,700 km (11,000 mi), with all natural villages of 100 residents or more connected by graded roads. Its expressway mileage ranked among the top three in Zhejiang.

==== Bus services ====
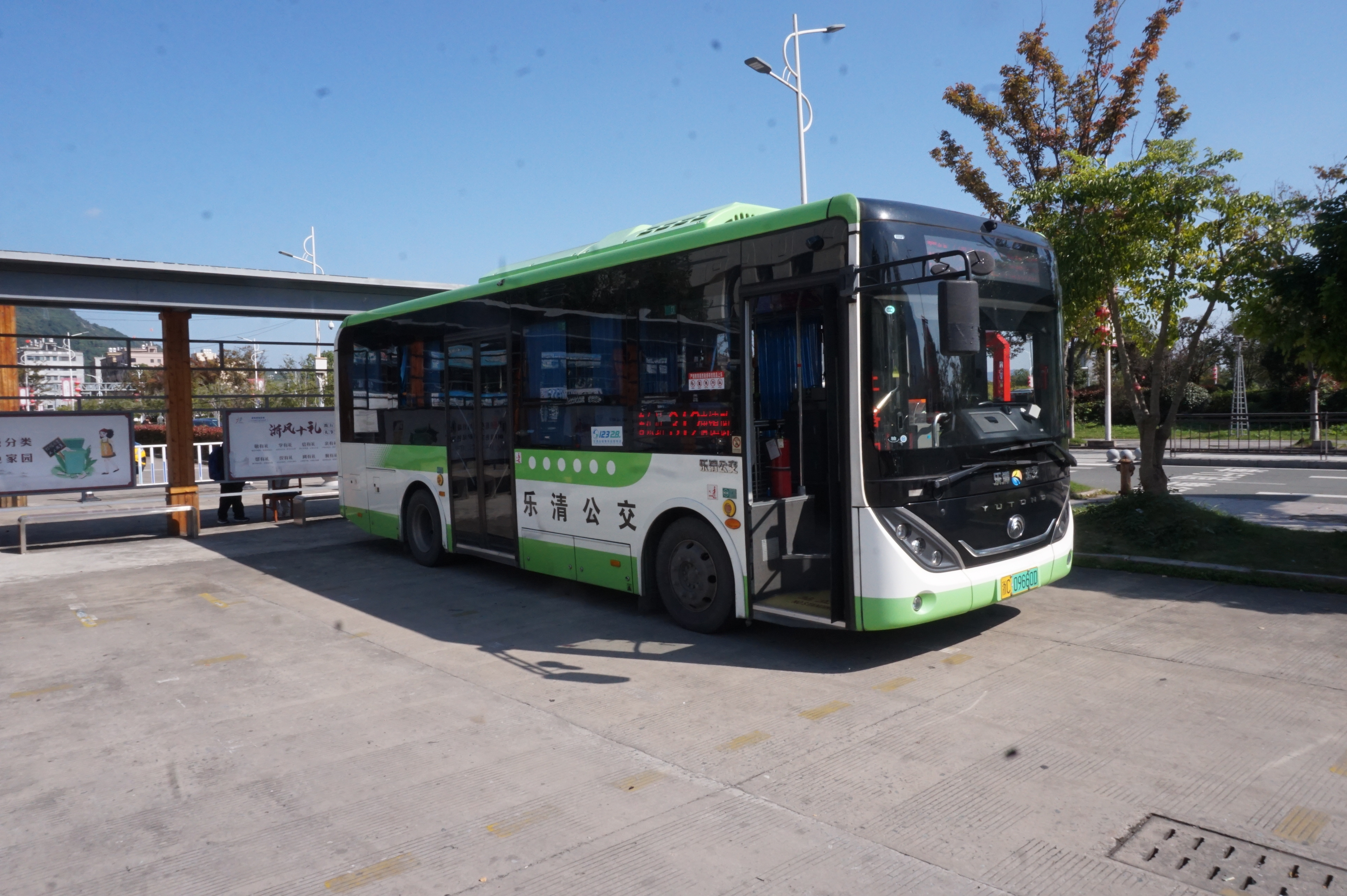
Yueqing bus route 312 running from Yueqing East Station to Nantang Town Government

Intercity coach services began in 1935, with scheduled buses operating between Wenzhou and Yiwu. The city introduced its first urban bus route in 1956. In December 2010, the Wenzhou Public Transport Group and Changyun Group merged to form Wenzhou Transport Group. In 2015, Wenzhou opened its first bus rapid transit line and later expanded the network to five routes; by 2018, the B1 line and its extensions carried an average of 1.389 million passenger trips per month, reported as the highest-ridership bus route in Zhejiang. By 2025, daily bus patronage in Wenzhou exceeded 700,000 passenger trips.

=== Port ===
The Port of Wenzhou is located on China’s southeast coast, south of the Port of Ningbo and north of the Port of Fuzhou. Across the sea to the southeast lie the ports of Kaohsiung and Keelung. The port forms part of the Yangtze Delta economic zone. With a coastline of about 350 km (220 mi), Wenzhou Port serves as the principal hub for coastal and deep-sea shipping in southern Zhejiang and is one of China’s 25 major coastal ports.

The port is organised into seven port areas. The core areas are Zhuangyuan’ao, Yueqing Bay, and Daxiaomen Island, supported by four auxiliary areas along the Ou River, Rui’an, Pingyang, and Cangnan. Before 2010, the main facilities were concentrated along the Ou River and lacked deep-water berths, prompting the development of the Zhuangyuan’ao and Yueqing Bay port areas. In 2017, the Wenzhou Zhuangyuan’ao International Cruise Terminal in Dongtou District entered service, becoming Zhejiang’s second international cruise home port after Zhoushan.

Wenzhou Port maintains shipping and trade links with ports in more than ten countries and regions, including Japan, South Korea, Kuwait, Russia, Singapore, and Hong Kong. Regular routes connect it with Busan, Singapore, Qingdao, Guangzhou, Ningbo, Shanghai, and Yingkou, as well as ports along China’s northern and southern coasts and the Yangtze River. In 2025, cargo throughput at Wenzhou Port exceeded 100 million tonnes for the first time.

== See also ==
- List of twin towns and sister cities in China

== Sources ==
- Cao, Nanlai, ed. (2011). Constructing China's Jerusalem: Christians, power, and place in contemporary Wenzhou. Stanford, Calif: Stanford University Press. ISBN 978-0-8047-7360-7.
- Chen, Caiyun (2011). 元代温州研究 [The study of Wenzhou in the Yuan dynasty] (in Chinese). Hangzhou: Zhejiang People's Publishing House. ISBN 978-7-213-04769-5.
- Jin, Yongxing (2002). 聚集与扩散：温州建制镇城市化研究 [Agglomeration and Dispersion: A Study of Urbanisation in Wenzhou’s Incorporated Towns] (in Chinese). Beijing: Social Sciences Academic Press. ISBN 7-80149-679-5.
- Lin, Yixiu (2009). 温州族群与区域文化研究 [The study of Wenzhou's ethnic and regional culture] (in Chinese). Shanghai: Shanghai Sanlian Bookstore. ISBN 978-7-5426-2995-1.
- Liu, Jianguo; Tan, Guitao, eds. (2018). 瓯江风云：温州革命斗争史纪实 [Storms on the Ou River: A Documentary Account of Wenzhou’s Revolutionary Struggles] (in Chinese). Hangzhou: Zhejiang University Press. ISBN 978-7-308-18004-7.
- People's Government of Lucheng District (1987). 鹿城地名志 [Lucheng Gazetteer] (in Chinese). Hangzhou: Zhejiang New China Printing Factory.
- Shi, Jinchuan; Jin, Xiangrong; Zhao, Wei; Luo, Weidong (2002). 制度变迁与经济发展：温州模式研究 [Institutional Change and Economic Development: A Study of the Wenzhou Model] (in Chinese). Hangzhou: Zhejiang University Press. ISBN 7-308-02992-1.
- Wang, Zan (2006) [1503]. Wenzhou Choronicles in Hongzhi Era 弘治温州府志 (in Chinese). Edited by Cai, Fang; Proofread by Hu, Zhusheng. Shanghai: Shanghai Academy of Social Sciences Press. ISBN 7-80681-841-3.
- Wenzhou City Annals Compiling Committee, ed. (1998). Wenzhou City Annals 温州市志 (in Chinese). Beijing: Zhonghua Book Company. ISBN 7-101-01852-1.
- Wenzhou Yearbook Editorial Department (2000). 温州4500年历史大事记 [A Chronological Record of Major Events in Wenzhou’s 4,500-Year History] (in Chinese). Beijing: Zhonghua Book Company. ISBN 9787101026382.
- Xu, Jiagui (2018). 乡国之际：晚清温州府士人与地方知识转型 [Between the County and the State: Scholar-Elites of Late Qing Wenzhou Prefecture and the Transformation of Local Knowledge] (in Chinese). Shanghai: Fudan University Press. ISBN 978-7-309-13619-7.
- Zhang, Renshou; Li, Hong (1990). 温州模式研究 [The study of Wenzhou Model] (in Chinese). Beijing: China Social Sciences Press. ISBN 7-5004-0538-3.
- Zhengzhang, Shangfang (2008). 温州方言志 [Chronicles of Wenzhou Vernacular] (in Chinese). Beijing: Zhonghua Book Company. ISBN 978-7-101-06036-2.
