= Wenzhou Rail Transit =

Rapid transit system serving Wenzhou, China

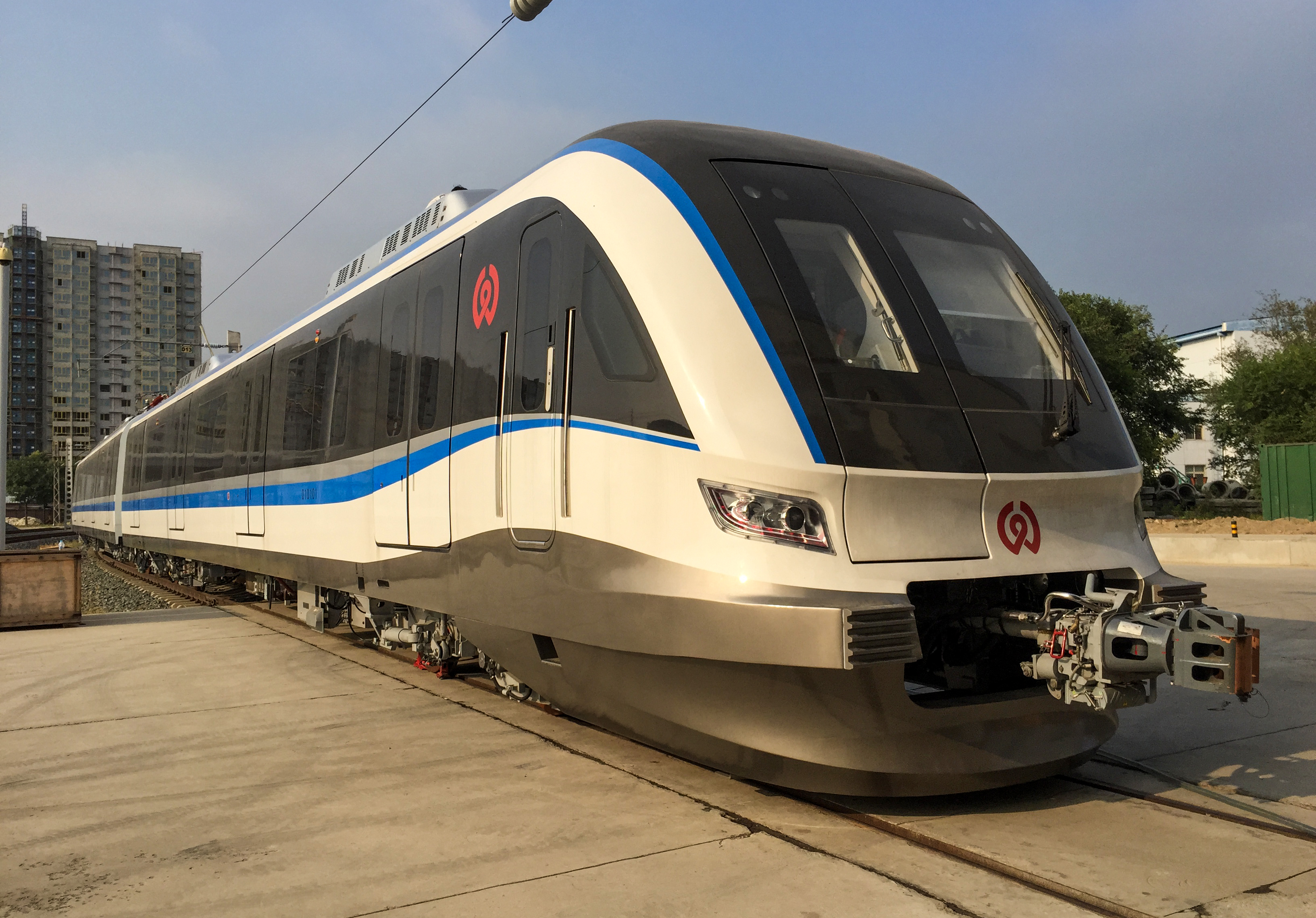

Overview
- Native name: 温州轨道交通
- Locale: Wenzhou, Zhejiang, China
- Transit type: Rapid transit
- Number of lines: 2
- Number of stations: 38
- Website: www.wzmtr.com

Operation
- Began operation: January 23, 2019; 7 years ago
- Operator: Wenzhou Mass Transit Rail Corporation (WZ-MTR)

Technical
- System length: 116.4 km (72.3 mi)
System map

Wenzhou Rail Transit
- Simplified Chinese: 温州轨道交通
- Traditional Chinese: 溫州軌道交通
Transcriptions
Standard Mandarin
- Hanyu Pinyin: Wēnzhōu Guǐdào Jiāotōng

Abbreviation
- Simplified Chinese: 温州轨交
- Traditional Chinese: 溫州軌交
Transcriptions
Standard Mandarin
- Hanyu Pinyin: Wēnzhōu Guǐjiāo

Wenzhou Rail Transit (Chinese: 温州轨道交通; pinyin: Wēnzhōu Guǐdào Jiāotōng), operated by Wenzhou Mass Transit Rail Corporation (abbreviated as WZ-MTR), is the rapid transit network serving the city of Wenzhou, Zhejiang Province, China.

Three lines (S1, S2 and S3) have received approval from the NDRC, and two more lines (M1 and M2) are not approved (de facto rejected) by NDRC. Line S1 has been under construction since November 2011 and was opened in January 2019. Line S2 opened in August 2023. Line S3 is under construction and will open in 2027. The first three lines are projected to cost about 50 billion yuan.

== Nomenclature ==
In the PRC in general both the terms 市郊铁路 (Urban-Suburban railway) and 市域铁路 (Perfectural railway) refers to newly-opened commuter/regional railway services in general interchangeably, and are designated with Latin letter S. In Southern Zhejiang province, however, 市郊铁路 refers to genuine commuter/regional lines like that of Transilien from Île-de-France, while 市域铁路, dubbed with S, refers to the partially underground urban system like that of the RER from said region.

Taizhou, in particular, has both systems in its rail transit in operation; while Wenzhou has both an RER-like system in operation and a planned rapid transit. The RER-like system has everything similar to a rapid transit in terms of operation, and has no direct connections with the national railway system, yet still has a loading gauge and signaling system inherited from the interprovincial railway and runs on the left track, and comes with a longer distance between stations (approximately 3km). Due to the state restrictions on rapid-transit building in smaller cities some city governments use this methods to circumvent such restrictions, branded as a rapid transit toward the citizens while as a commuter rail toward the central government.

== In operation ==
Line	Termini (District)		Commencement	Newest Extension	Length km	Stations
S1	Tongling (Ouhai)	Shuang'ou Avenue (Dongtou)	23 January 2019	28 September 2019	53.5	18
S2	Qingdong Road (Yueqing)	Dongshan (Rui'an)	26 August 2023		62.945	20
Total					116.4	38

=== Line S1 ===
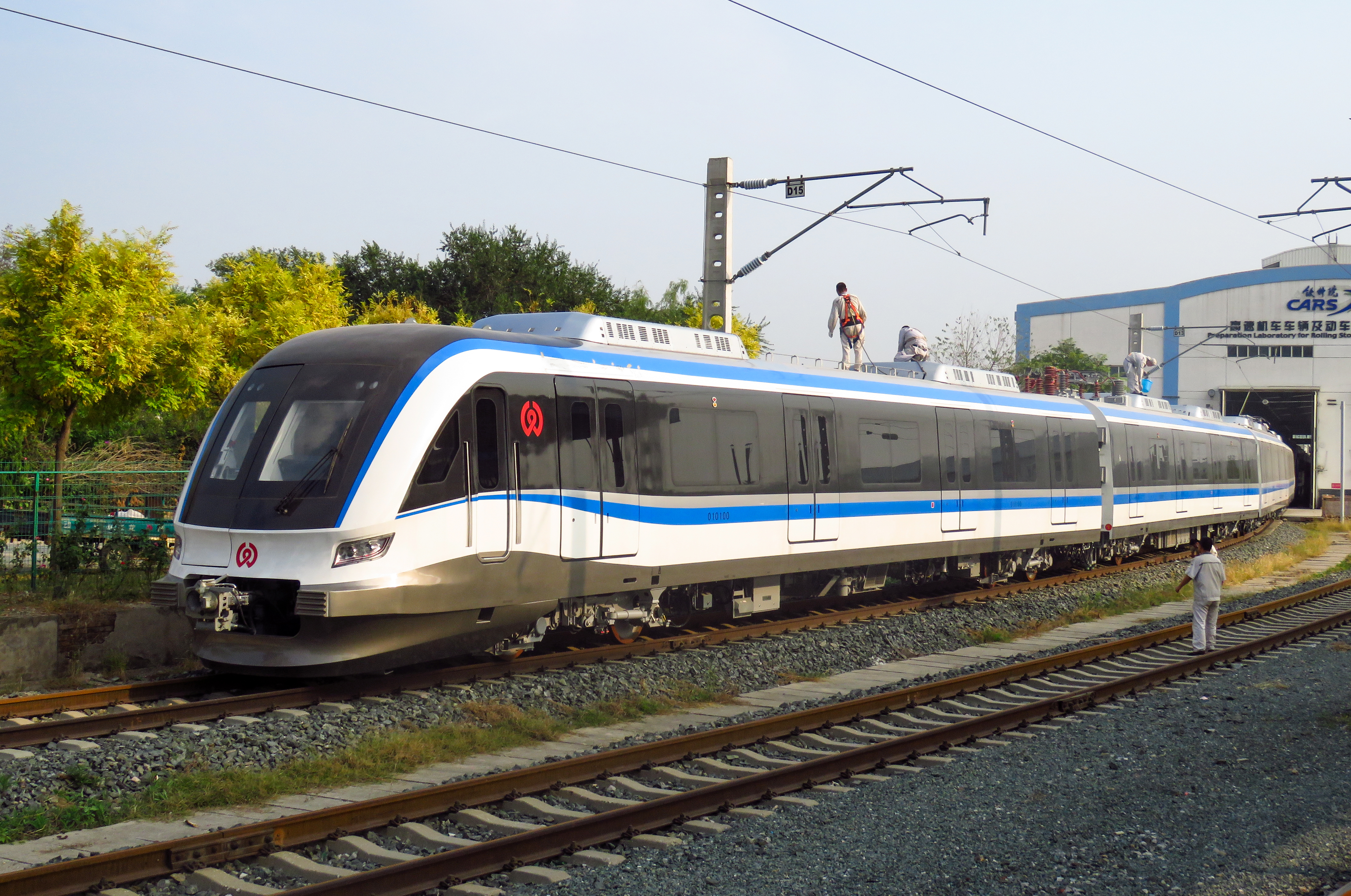
Train of Line S1 (Wenzhou Metro), built by CRRC Qingdao Sifang

The first phase of Line S1 begins at Tongling station in the west, south of Wenzhou South Railway Station, and ends at Shuang'ou Avenue station in the east, with 53.5 kilometres (33.243 mi) of track and 18 stations. Construction of the Shitan Tunnel of Line S1 began on 11 November 2011, and the rest of the line officially began construction in March 2013. Line S1 was originally scheduled to open in October 2018. The west section of the line (34.38 km (21.363 mi) with 12 stations) was opened on January 23, 2019. The last section of the line (19.127 km (11.885 mi) with 6 stations) was opened on September 28, 2019.

=== Line S2 ===
The first phase of Line S2 runs from Qingdong Road Station in Yueqing to Dongshan Station in Rui'an, with 62.945 kilometres (39.112 mi) of track and 20 stations, including one at Wenzhou Longwan International Airport. Construction of S2 began in January 2016. Line S2 will feature distinct express and local services. Line S2 opened on August 26, 2023.

== Approved lines ==
As of 2023, one line is under construction: Line S3.

Line	Terminals		Planned opening	Length km	Stations
S3	Wenzhou Railway Station (Lucheng)	Feiyun (Rui'an)	2027	31.05	13

The first phase of Wenzhou Rail Transit received official approval from the National Development and Reform Commission in September 2012. This phase includes three lines: S1, S2, and S3, with a total length of 140.7 kilometres (87.427 mi). Construction is projected to complete by 2018, at an estimated cost of about 50 billion yuan.

=== Line S3 ===
The first phase of Line S3 starts at Wenzhou Railway Station, along Wenrui Avenue, passes through Nanbaixiang, Xianyan, Tangxia to Rui'an City, then crosses Feiyun River to the south, passes Kunyang, Aojiang, Longgang, to Lingxi. It is expected to open in 2027.

The first phase of the Wenzhou Rail Transit S3 Line has a total length spans 31.05 kilometers (19.29 mi), comprising an underground stretch of 2.821 kilometers (1.753 mi) and an elevated segment of 24.17 kilometers (15.02 mi). This phase includes 13 stations, with 10 elevated stations and 3 underground stations incorporated along the route.

The second phase of this line, costing 26.40 billion yuan, extends over a length of 66 kilometers (41 mi) and encompasses 17 stations. Approximately 32.4% of this phase consists of underground lines, traversing through the districts of Rui'an City, Pingyang County, Cangnan County, and Longgang City.

== Short-term plans ==
On March 21, 2019, the Wenzhou government announced plans for Line M1 and Line M2. As of November 18, 2026, Line M1 and Line M2 have not been approved by NDRC, so actual construction have not started.

Line	Terminals		Length km	Stations
M1	Li'ao	Jinsui Road	32.5	23
M2	Chencun	Kejicheng	27.9	23

=== Line M1 ===
Line M1 is a fully underground line with 23 stations. The length of the line is 32.5 km (20.2 mi).

=== Line M2 ===
Phase 1 of Line M2 is a fully underground line with 23 stations. The length of the line is 27.9 km (17.3 mi).

== Long-term plans ==
=== Line S4 ===
Line S4 is planned to run in a northwest-southeast direction, from Tengqiao in the west to Huanghua Station in the east, where it will connect with Line S2. Its total length is projected to be 47.15 km (29.30 mi), with 10 stations.

== Network map ==
Map showing operational and under construction lines of Wenzhou Rail Transit.

== See also ==
- List of metro systems
- Urban rail transit in China
