= Huling, China =

Town in Rui'an, China

Huling is a town in Rui'an, China. This town spans a total area of 31.4 km^{2} (12.1 sq mi), and the total population of Huling is 22,000. Huling possesses 6,496.5 acres (2,629.0 ha) of arable land.

== General Information ==
Huling is 34 km (21 mi) northwest of Rui'an City, Zhejiang, China. The town has an area of 31.4 km^{2} (12.1 sq mi) and a population of 22,000. Most of the territory is hilly and mountainous with river valleys and plains in the middle rich in agricultural resources. The town is directly connected to Ouhai by Hufang Highway through Fangzhuang Township, and the planned Quhu Highway leads to Ouhai via Linxi Township to the east, and Rui (An) Feng (Ling) Highway runs east–west through the town. The town mainly produces rice and wheat, but also produces handicrafts, clothing, toilet paper and beef.

== History ==
=== 20th Century ===
The town was established in 1931 and renamed as a commune in 1958. 1984, the town of Lake Township in 1992, merged with the Hangyuan Township for the restoration of Lake Town.
