= Line S1 (Wenzhou Rail Transit) =

Suburban railway line in Wenzhou, China

- S1
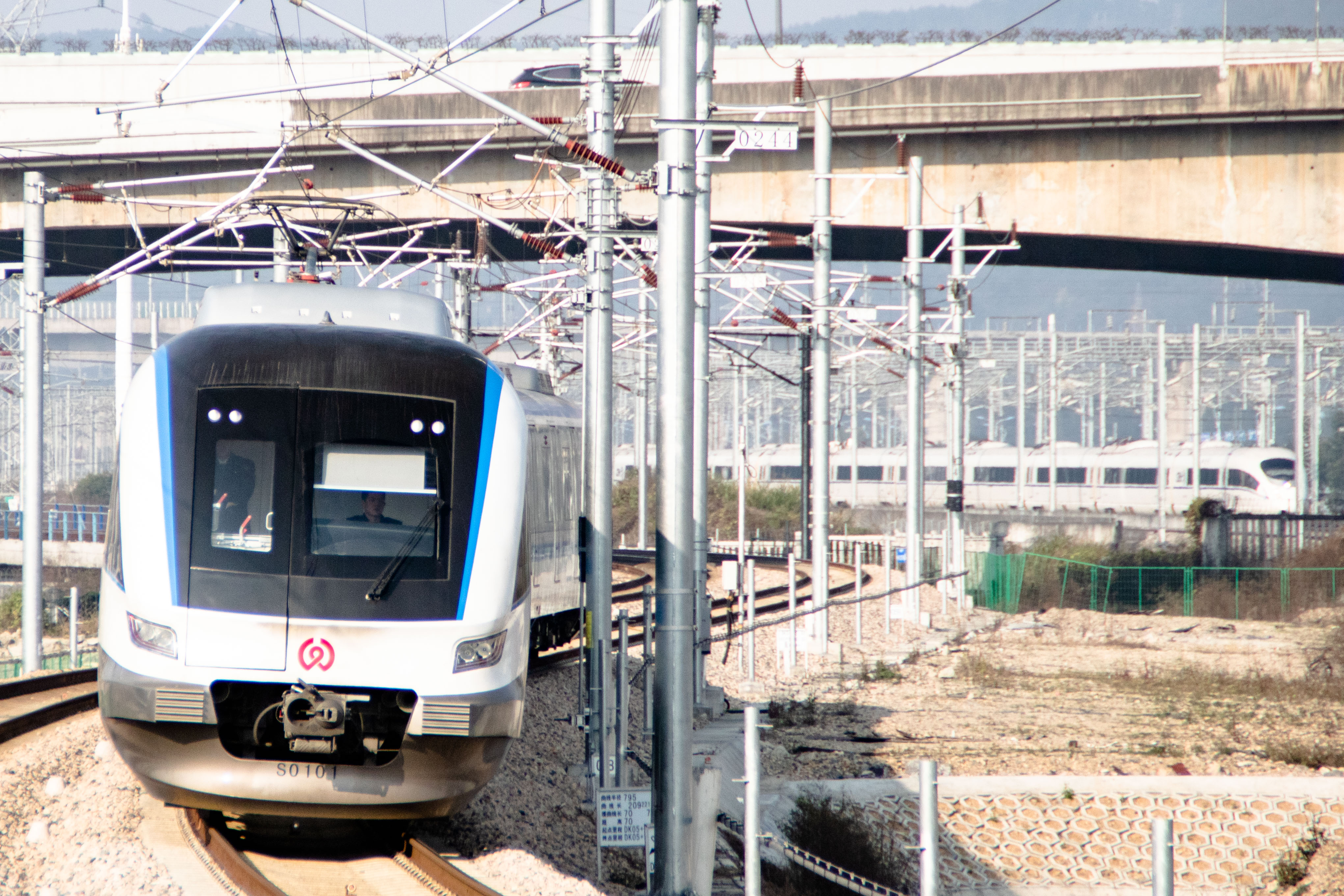

Overview
- Locale: Wenzhou, Zhejiang, China
- Termini: Tongling; Shuang'ou Avenue
- Stations: 18

Service
- Type: Hybrid commuter rail and rapid transit
- System: Wenzhou Rail Transit
- Operator(s): Wenzhou Mass Transit Rail Corporation (WZ-MTR)
- Rolling stock: CRRC Qingdao Sifang SFM28 (demonstrators, 2 sets); CRRC Qingdao Sifang Cinova-140 (30 sets)

History
- Opened: 23 January 2019; 7 years ago

Technical
- Line length: 53.5 km (33.24 mi)
- Number of tracks: 2
- Character: Underground and Elevated
- Track gauge: 1,435 mm (4 ft 8 1/2 in)
- Electrification: Overhead lines, 25 kV 50 Hz AC
- Operating speed: 120 km/h (maximum speed)

Line S1
- Simplified Chinese: 温州轨道交通S1线
- Traditional Chinese: 溫州軌道交通S1線
Transcriptions
Standard Mandarin
- Hanyu Pinyin: Wēnzhōu Guǐdào Jiāotōng S-Yī Xiàn

Line S1 of the Wenzhou Rail Transit (Chinese: 温州轨道交通S1线; pinyin: Wēnzhōu Guǐdào Jiāotōng S-Yī Xiàn) is a suburban rapid transit line in Wenzhou running from Tongling to Shuang'ou Avenue. The west section (Tongling - Olympic Center) has 12 stations (Note: Excluding 3 reserved stations: Xiuyu, Wenzhou Railway Station, and Wenchang.) and is 34.38 km (21.36 mi). The west section was opened on January 23, 2019. The east section of the line (19.127 km (11.885 mi) with 6 stations) was opened on September 28, 2019.

The full line is 53.5 kilometres (33.2 mi) long.

== Opening timeline ==
Segment	Commencement	Length	Station(s)	Name
Tongling — Olympic Center	23 January 2019	34.38 km (21.36 mi)	12	Western section of Phase 1
Olympic Center — Shuang'ou Avenue	28 September 2019	19.127 km (11.885 mi)	6	Eastern section of Phase 1

== Stations ==
station name		Transfer	Distance km	Location
English	Chinese	Transfer	Distance km	Location
Tongling	桐岭			Ouhai
Panqiao	潘桥			Ouhai
South Railway Station	动车南	VRH		Ouhai
Xiuyu (reserved station)	秀屿			Ouhai
Xinqiao	新桥			Ouhai
Dezheng	德政			Lucheng
Longxia Road	龙霞路			Ouhai
Wenzhou Railway Station (reserved station)	温州火车站	RZH S3 (planned)		Lucheng
Huimin Road	惠民路			Lucheng
Sanyang Wetland	三垟湿地			Ouhai
Wenchang (reserved station)	文昌			Ouhai / Lucheng
Longteng Road	龙腾路			Longwan
Kejicheng	科技城			Longwan
Yaoxi	瑶溪			Longwan
Olympic Center	奥体中心			Longwan
Yongzhong	永中			Longwan
Airport	机场	WNZ; S2		Longwan
Lingkun	灵昆	S2		Dongtou
Oujiangkou	瓯江口			Dongtou
Ouhua	瓯华			Dongtou
Shuang'ou Avenue	双瓯大道			Dongtou

== Gallery ==
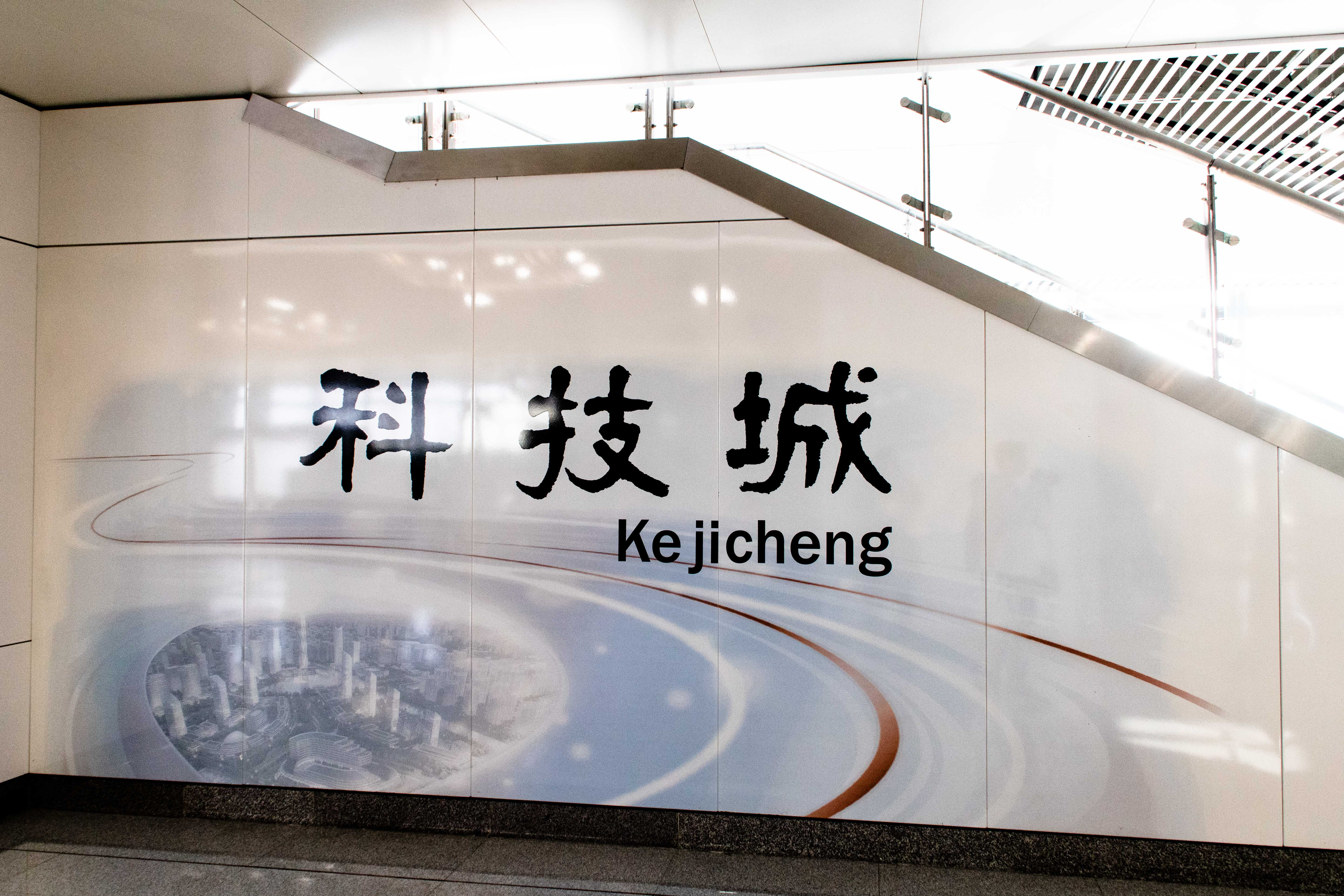
Kejicheng station

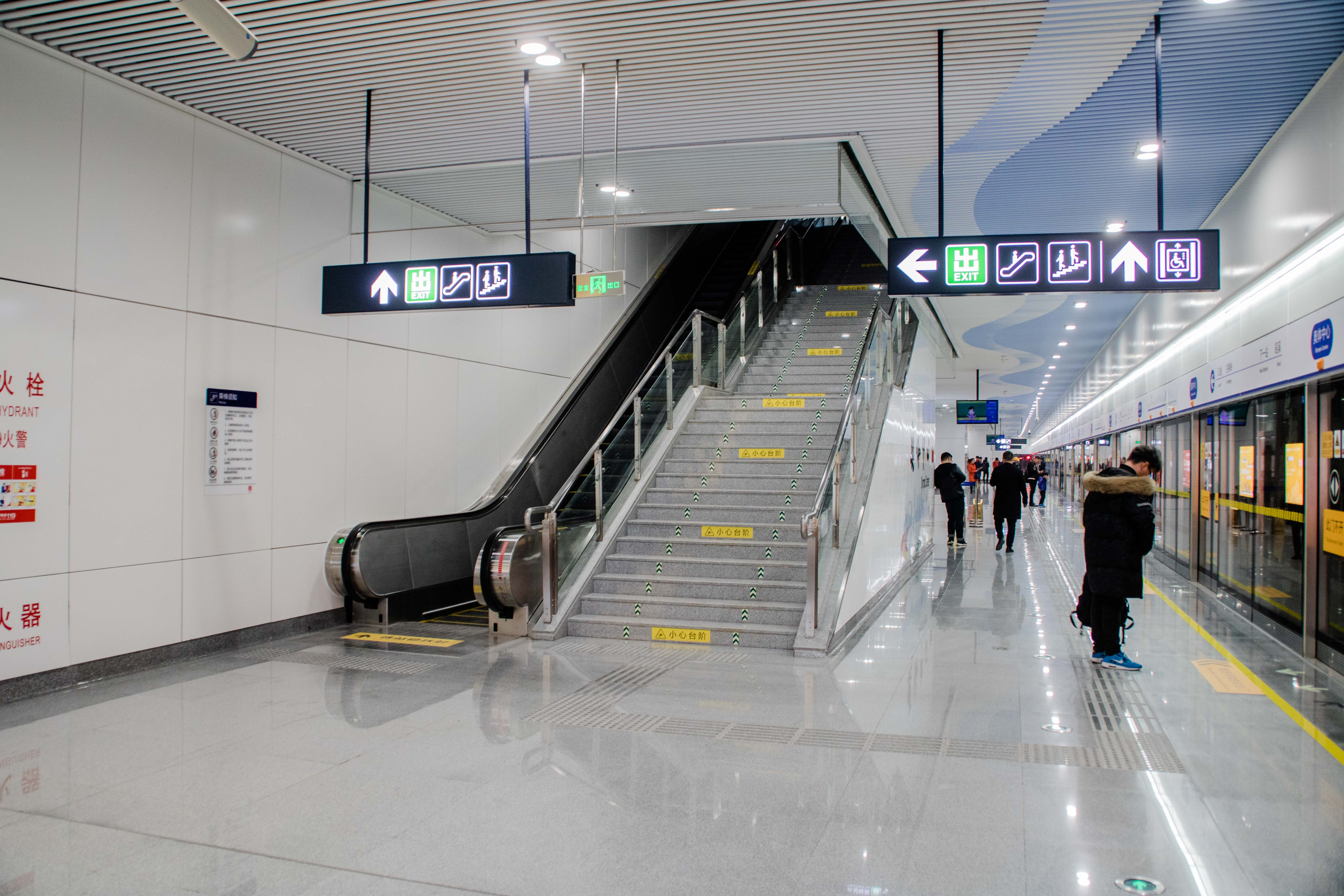
Olympic Center station
