= Tangxia =

Tangxia may refer to the following locations in China:

- Tangxia, Dongguan (塘厦镇), town in Guangdong
- Tangxia, Jiangmen (棠下镇), town in Pengjiang District, Jiangmen, Guangdong
- Tangxia, Rui'an (塘下镇), town in Zhejiang
