= Line S2 (Wenzhou Rail Transit) =

Metro line in Wenzhou, China

- S2
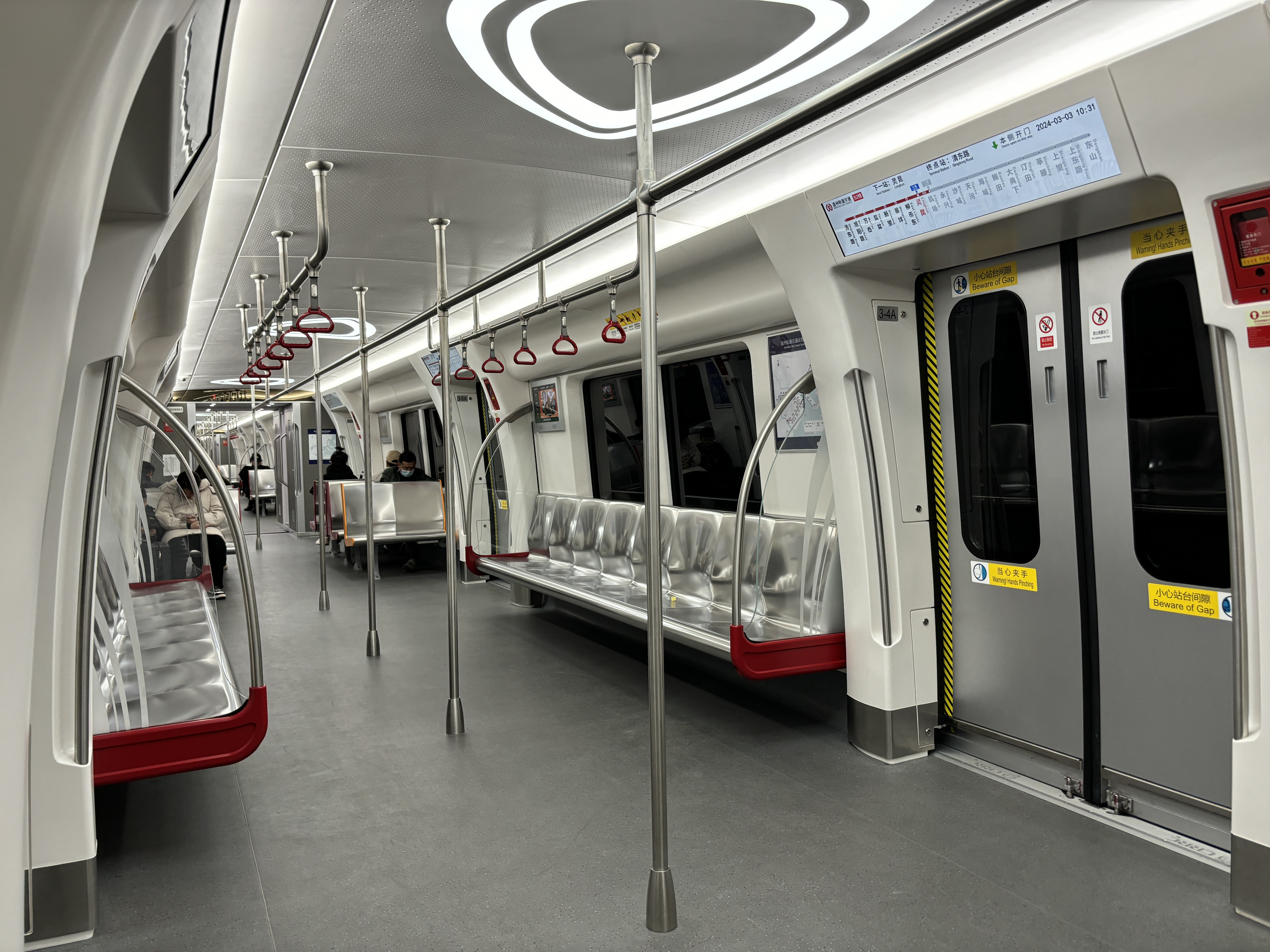
- Interior of Line S2 train

Overview
- Locale: Wenzhou, Zhejiang, China
- Termini: Qingdong Road; Dongshan
- Stations: 20

Service
- Type: Hybrid commuter rail and rapid transit
- System: Wenzhou Rail Transit
- Operator: Wenzhou Mass Transit Rail Corporation (WZ-MTR)
- Rolling stock: 4-car Cinova-140 (Type D)

History
- Opened: 26 August 2023; 3 years ago

Technical
- Line length: 62.945 km (39.11 mi)
- Num of tracks: 2
- Character: Underground and Elevated
- Track gauge: 1,435 mm (4 ft 8 1/2 in)
- Electrification: Overhead lines, AC 25 kV 50 Hz
- Operating speed: 140 km/h (maximum speed)

Line S2 of the Wenzhou Rail Transit (Chinese: 温州轨道交通S2线; pinyin: Wēnzhōu Guǐdào Jiāotōng S-Èr Xiàn) is a suburban rapid transit line in Wenzhou running from Qingdong Road to Dongshan. The line is 62.945 kilometres long. The line was opened on 26 August 2023.

== Stations ==
| Service routes | | Station name | | Transfer | Distance km | Location |
| Local | Rapid | English | Chinese | Transfer | Distance km | Location |
|---|---|---|---|---|---|---|
| ● | ● | Qingdong Road | 清东路 | | | Yueqing |
| ● | ● | Xuyang Road | 旭阳路 | | | Yueqing |
| ● | | | Wan'ao | 万岙 | | | Yueqing |
| ● | | | Yanpen | 盐盆 | | | Yueqing |
| ● | | | Xinwang | 新望 | | | Yueqing |
| ● | ● | Wengyang | 翁垟 | | | Yueqing |
| ● | | | Liushi East | 柳市东 | | | Yueqing |
| ● | ● | Lingkun | 灵昆 | S1 | | Dongtou |
| ● | ● | Airport | 机场 | S1; WNZ | | Longwan |
| ● | | | Yongxing | 永兴 | | | Longwan |
| ● | | | Shacheng | 沙城 | | | Longwan |
| ● | ● | Tianhe | 天河 | | | Longwan |
| ● | | | Haicheng | 海城 | | | Longwan |
| ● | ● | Baotian | 鲍田 | | | Rui'an |
| ● | | | Dadianxia | 大典下 | | | Rui'an |
| ● | | | Tingtian | 汀田 | | | Rui'an |
| ● | ● | Xincheng | 莘塍 | | | Rui'an |
| ● | | | Shangwang | 上望 | | | Rui'an |
| ● | | | Shangdong Road | 上东路 | | | Rui'an |
| ● | ● | Dongshan | 东山 | S3 (U/C) | | Rui'an |
