= Line 2 (Wenzhou Rail Transit) =

Future metro line in Wenzhou, China

Overview
- Other name: M2 (until February 2025)
- Status: Under planning
- Owner: Wenzhou Rail Transit
- Locale: Wenzhou, Zhejiang, China
- Termini: Chencun; Kejicheng (Phase 1 formerly) Puzhou (New plan)
- Stations: 23 (Phase 1 formerly); 18 (New plan)

Service
- Type: Rapid transit
- System: Wenzhou Rail Transit
- Operator: Wenzhou Rail Transit

Technical
- Line length: 27.9 km (17.3 mi) (Phase 1 formerly); 20.35 km (12.64 mi) (New plan)
- Num of tracks: 2
- Track gauge: 1,435 mm (4 ft 8 1/2 in)

Line 2, formerly known as Line M2 of Wenzhou Rail Transit is a metro line under pending approval in Wenzhou, Zhejiang, China.

== History ==
In February 2011, the "Wenzhou Urban Rail Transit Plan" was released, included Line 2.

On 21 March 2019, the Wenzhou municipal government website was published Wenzhou City Rail Transit Near-Term Construction Plan Environmental Impact Assessment Public Notice (2020–2026), which included phase 1 of Line M1 and Line M2.

On April 22, 2019, the near-term construction plan for Line M passed the provincial preliminary review, aiming to submit it to the National Development and Reform Commission for approval by the end of 2019.

On February 2025, the Wenzhou Municipal Bureau of Natural Reources and Planning was published the feedback of Wenzhou Urban Rail Transit Network Planning (2021-2035). The name was changed to Line 2 instead of Line M2.

As of November 22, 2026, Line M2 have not been approved by NDRC, so actual construction have not started.

== Stations ==
Station name		Transfer	Distance km	Location
English	Chinese	Transfer	Distance km	Location
Chencun	陈村			
Xiedu Avenue	鞋都大道			
Shuangjin Road	双金路			
Shuangyu Passenger Transport Center	双屿客运中心			
Lucheng Industrial Zone	鹿城工业区			
Xiayin	下寅			
Jiangbin Park	江滨公园			
Qinfen Road	勤奋路			
Worker's Cultural Palace	工人文化宫			
Haitan Square	海坛广场	M1		
Ouzhoucheng	欧洲城			
Lucheng Square	鹿城广场			
Huimin Road	惠民路			
Fudong Road	府东路			
Convention and Exhibition Center	会展中心			
CBD Center	CBD中心	M3		
Xintian Road	新田路			
Puzhou	蒲州			
Fuchunjiang Road	富春江路			
Lanjiang Road	兰江路			
Tian'ehu Community	天鹅湖社区			
North Longteng Road	龙腾路北			
Fuchunjiang Road	富春江路			
Kejicheng	科技城	S1		
