= Wenzhou South railway station =

Railway station in Wenzhou, China

Wenzhounan 温州南
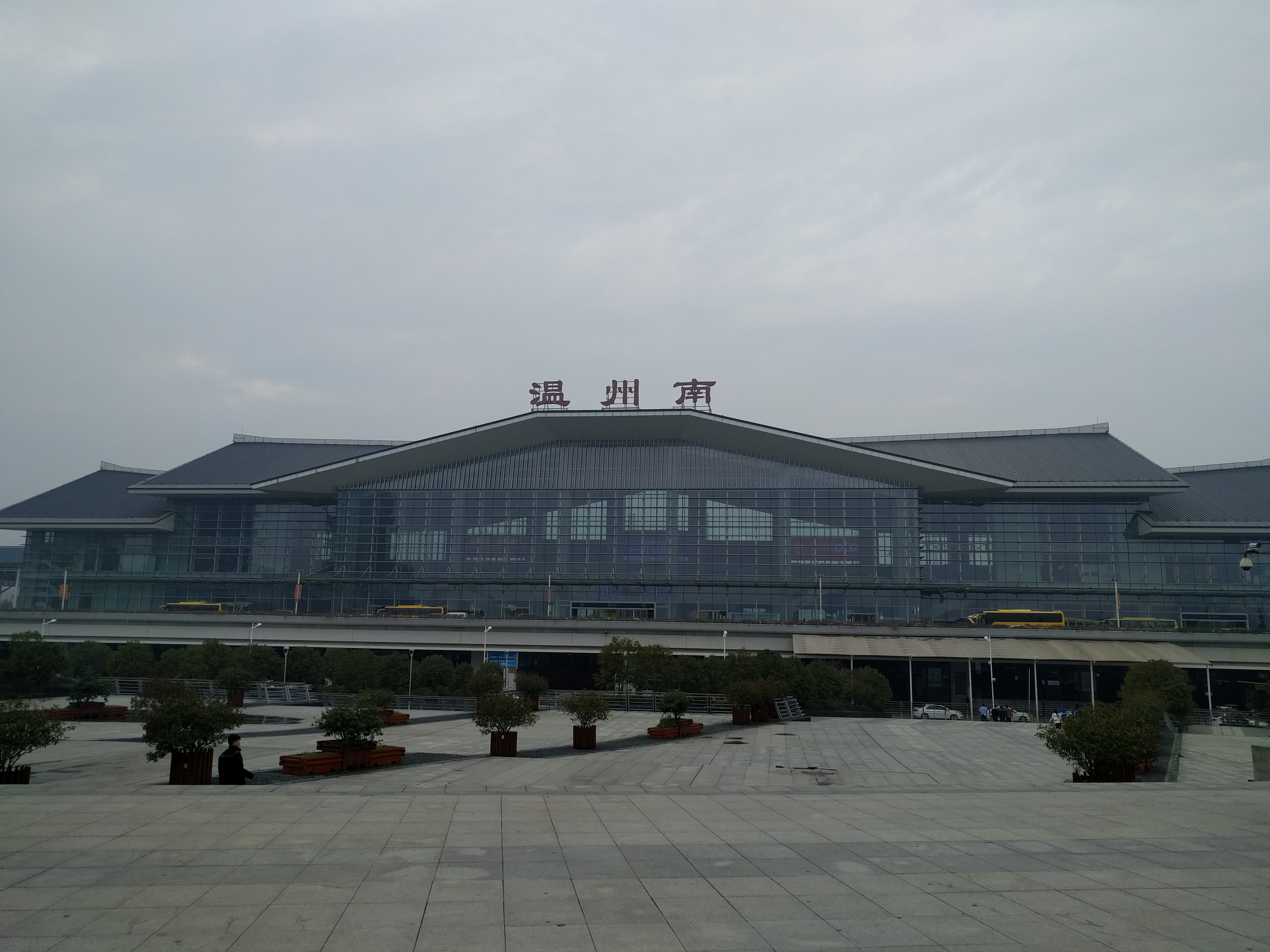
- Wenzhounan railway station façade in 2016

General information
- Other names: Wenzhou South
- Location: Ouhai District, Wenzhou, Zhejiang; China
- Coordinates: 27.9694°N 120.5809°E
- Operated by: China Railway Shanghai Group, China Railway Corporation
- Line(s): Ningbo–Taizhou–Wenzhou railway; Jinhua–Wenzhou high-speed railway; Wenzhou–Fuzhou railway
- Platforms: 4
- Connections: Bus terminal

History
- Opened: 2009

Wenzhounan (Wenzhou South) railway station (simplified Chinese: 温州南站; traditional Chinese: 溫州南站; pinyin: Wēnzhōu-nán zhàn) is a railway station located in Ouhai District, Wenzhou, Zhejiang Province, China, on the Wenzhou–Fuzhou railway, Ningbo–Taizhou–Wenzhou railway, and Jinhua–Wenzhou high-speed railway which are operated by China Railway Shanghai Group, China Railway Corporation.

== History ==
Construction of the station began in October 2008. It opened on September 28, 2009.

== Metro station ==
Line S1 of Wenzhou Rail Transit opened on January 23, 2019.

== See also ==
- Wenzhou railway station
- Wenzhou North railway station

Preceding station	China Railway High-speed	Following station
Wenzhou North towards Ningbo	Ningbo–Taizhou–Wenzhou railway	Terminus
Terminus	Wenzhou–Fuzhou railway	Rui'an towards Fuzhou South
Qingtian towards Jinhua	Jinhua–Wenzhou high-speed railway	Terminus
