= Wenzhou railway station =

Railway station in Wenzhou, Zhejiang

Wenzhou 温州
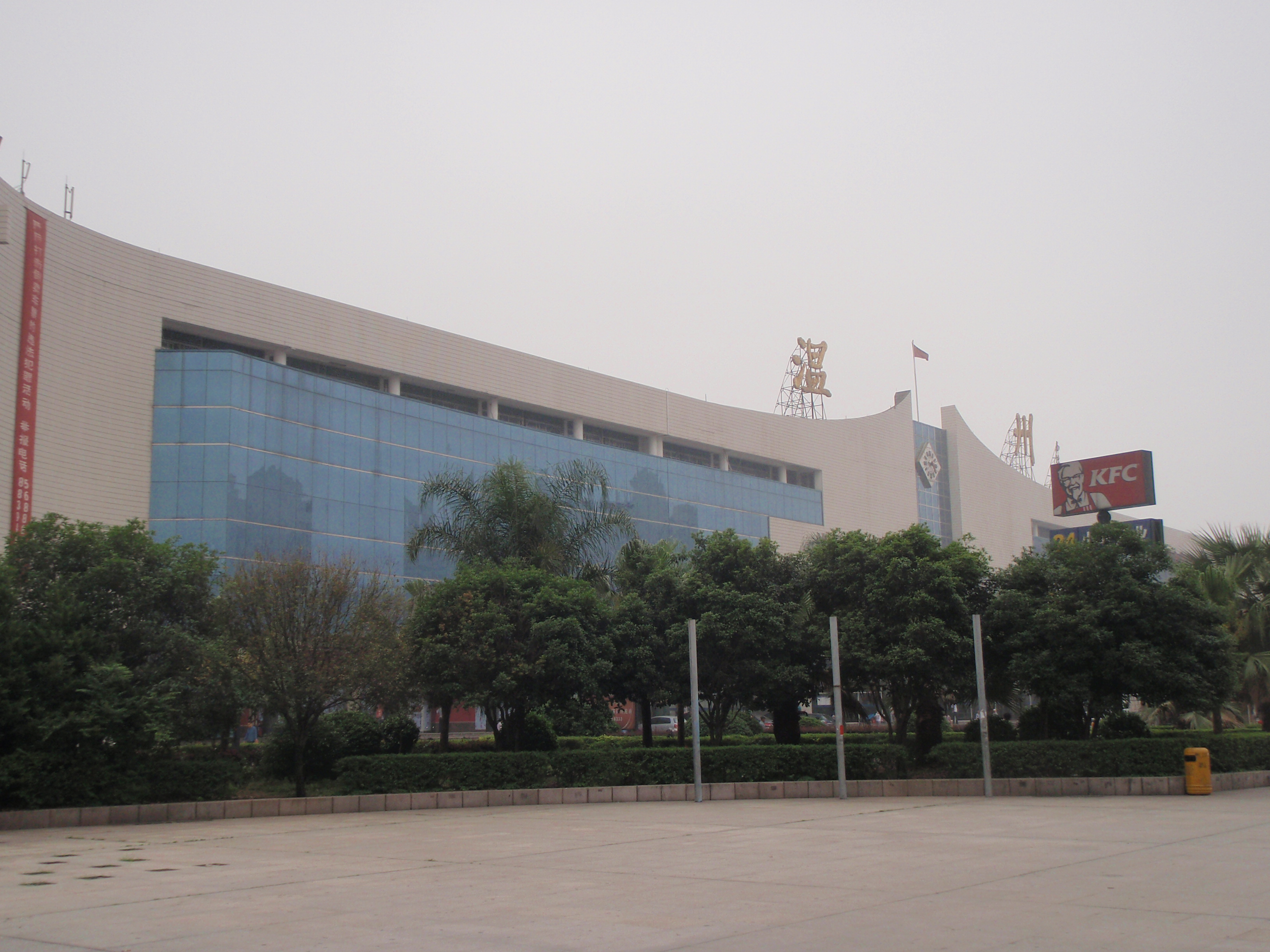

General information
- Location: Lucheng District, Wenzhou, Zhejiang; China
- Coordinates: 27.980324°N 120.685092°E
- Line: Jinhua–Wenzhou railway

History
- Opened: 11 June 1998
Location

Wenzhou railway station (Chinese: 温州站; pinyin: Wēnzhōu zhàn) is a railway station in Lucheng District, Wenzhou, Zhejiang, China. It is the eastern terminus for passenger services on the Jinhua–Wenzhou railway. It opened with the line on 11 June 1998.

== See also ==
- Wenzhou South railway station
- Wenzhou North railway station
