= S3 Shanghai–Fengxian Highway =

Road in Shanghai, China

Shanghai–Fengxian Expressway
- Hufeng Highway 沪奉公路

Route information
- Length: 3.12 km (1.94 mi)

Major junctions
- South end: Shanghai S20 / Luoshan Elevated Road in Pudong New Area
- To: Zhoudeng Highway in Pudong New Area

Location
- Country: China
- Province: Shanghai

Highway system
- Transport in China
← S2	→ S4

Hufeng Highway (Chinese: 沪奉公路), designated S3, is a planned expressway within the city of Shanghai. It was originally known as Expressway Line 5 or the A3 expressway. According to preliminary reports, the expressway is expected to cost CN¥ 16,000,000,000. In December 2016 the first section was open to public, which is 3.12 km long.

== See also ==
- Expressways of Shanghai
