= Middle Yandang Mountains =

Mountain range in Southeast China

- 东南第一山

Highest point
- Elevation: 598.3 m (1,963 ft)
- Coordinates: 28°8′2″N 120°51′44″E

Naming
- Native name: 中雁荡山 (Chinese)

Geography
- Location within China
- Location: Wenzhou, Zhejiang Province, China
- Parent range: Yandang

Middle Yandang Mountains or Zhong Yandang Shan (Chinese: 中雁荡山; pinyin: Zhōng Yàndàng Shān; lit. 'Middle Wild Goose Pond Mountain(s)') refers, in the broad sense, to a coastal mountain range in southeastern Zhejiang Province in eastern China, which is close to Yandang Mountains, and both of them are parts of Yandang Ridge. It is said that people found that there was a lake in the top of the mountain, which was covered with reeds. And many wild geese lived there. Therefore, it is called "Yandang". It is historically called "the Best Mountain in Southeastern China". Comparing to Yandang Mountains, it seems like a religious interest rather than a geographic interest, which does not mean that Yandang Mountains are much better than Middle Yandang Mountains when it comes to natural landscape, but the latter is unique because of the religion. With cool climate and convenient traffic, as well as palatable sea food, it has been affirmed as one of the best ten summer resort in Zhejiang Province. It is said a Taoist priest, who believed in Taoism, came here and built a temple.

== History ==
The history of Yandang Mountains is quite long. The time when human first went here and built their house could be traced back to Southern and Northern Dynasties. However, when it comes to Middle Yandang Mountain, it was Song dynasty when the chin-shih Li Shao-he (Chinese: 李少和) first came here and built a Taoism Temple. Then more and more people came here because of the fame of Li Shao-he and religious ethos.

In modern China, to facilitate the growth of local economy, both local government and indigenous people want to build a scenic spot base on Middle Yandang Mountains. However, the condition of government finance was not good, which means if people want to construct the scenic spot, they need pay the fare of project. Finally, villagers raised money by themselves and built the scenic spot.

The entrance tickets of scenery spot are free for local people. Many local schools organize an annual spring excursion here.

== Poetry ==
千里带长堤，
万里泻长汀。
——谢灵运/Xie Ling-yun

In ancient China, many poets habitually wrote or sang poetry upon encountering a beautiful landscape. They depicts the landscape and express their aspirations and feelings by it. In Middle Yandang Mountains, many poets left their opus, like Xie Lingyun and Wang Shi-peng.

=== Xie Ling-yun (Chinese: 谢灵运) ===
East Waterside

In 422 A.C, Xie was sent to Yongjia County as prefecture chief. One day, he came to the root of Middle Yandang Mountains and inspected the farms. At that time, he was attracted by the landscape and wrote, "The far embankment lies thousands of miles, the long spit of land like river flows millions of miles." (Chinese: 千里带长堤，万里泻长汀。)Because of the fame of Xie, Middle Yandang Mountains became more and more well-known.

=== Wang Shi-peng (Chinese: 王十朋) ===
Wang was one of the Zhuangyuan in Southern Song dynasty(1127–1279), whose homeland was Yueqing, a city now lies at the root of Middle Yandang Mountains. He wrote, "The lakes and mountains like green lies here, and the two streams flows like the sound of Chinese Zither." (Chinese: 十里湖山翠黛横，两溪寒玉斗琮琤)

=== Others ===
Except Xie and Wang, there were still some poets writing poems for specific mountains or lakes. Poet lived in Tang dynasty(618–907) called Zhang You-xin (Chinese: 张又新) sang a poetry for Yu-zhen Peak that "The Lake in front of the Yu-zhen Peak with spring is here, there is clean dust on the road aside." (Chinese: 白石岩前湖水春，湖边旧径有清尘) Another poet in Qing dynasty called Lin Qi-heng (Chinese: 林启亨) wrote, "The peak rises steeply from the ground just like a post, the length of it seems to break through the sky" (Chinese: 拔地一峰真似柱，巉岩百丈欲撑天), which depicted the appearance of Bai-zhang Peak. At the East Waterside, there is a rock similar to a woman who is waiting for her husband called Mrs. Rock. A poet in Ming dynasty(1368–1644) named Gao You-ji (Chinese: 高友玑) wrote, "Standing alone and gazing into the border of sky, there are only rocks near myself." (Chinese: 亭亭独立望天津，四畔无家石相邻)

== Speciality crop ==
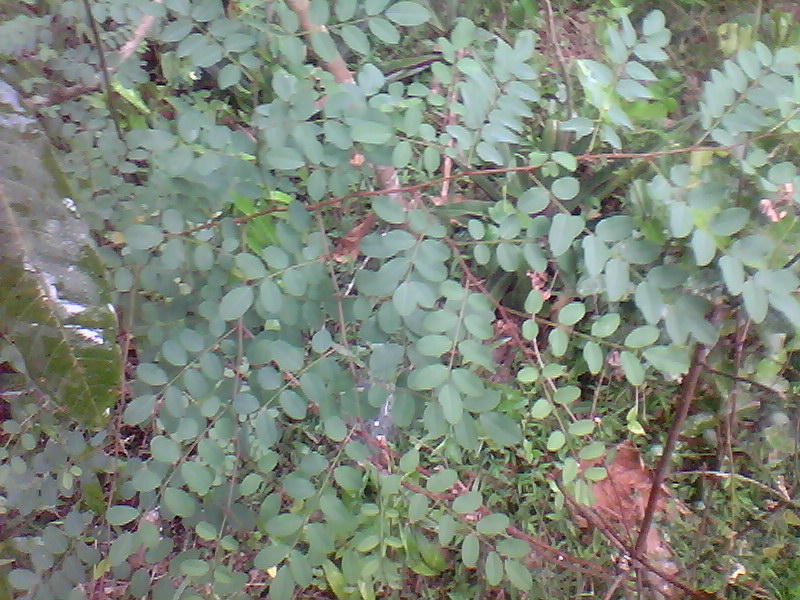
Indigofera tinctoria

Indigo, a plant used to dye clothing, which could make the cloth blue. It has been regarded as an ingredient of dye for a long time. In Encourage Learning, an article of Xunzi, indigo was mentioned as a metaphor that students will be better than teachers. (Chinese: 青出于蓝而胜于蓝) In 1940–1956, the output of indigo continued to increase. However, after that time, with the importation of foreign dye, the production of indigo has been decreased. Nowadays, there are only a few people planting indigo.

Indigo also can be used as an ingredient of medicine, especially its root. In 2003, when SARS was spreading widely in China, the root of indigo has been made as a medicine called Isatis (Chinese: 板蓝根)

== Tourism ==
Scenery Spots
Yu-zhen Peak
Yu-zhen Peak 玉甄峰
No.	Name	Kanji
1	Yu-zhen Peak	玉甄景区
2	Three Lakes	三湖景区
3	West Waterside	西漈景区
4	East Waterside	东漈景区
5	Phoenix Mountain	凤凰山景区
6	Yang-ba Hole	杨八洞景区
7	Liu-Gong Valley	刘公谷景区

There are seven scenery spots in Middle Yandang Mountains, including Yu-zhen Peak, Three Lakes, West Waterside, East Waterside, Phoenix Mountain, Yang-ba Hole and Liu-Gong Valley.

=== Yu-zhen Peak ===
Yu-zhen Peak is the main peak of the scenery spots and regarded as the totem of Middle Yandang Mountains. It seems that Yu-zhen Peak is quite high although the absolute elevation is just approximately 568 m. At the top of the mountain, there is a Taoism Temple there, which is built by chin-shih Li Shao-he. The main part of the mountain is rock and the Taoism Temple lies here, local people also call it Taoist Priest Rock. Thanks to wide rock walls, artists and litterateurs created their work here so that there are many lithographs.

Except the main temple, there is also a cave called Yu-hong Cave, which lies the middle of the peak, including a group of Taoism constructions. According to the book Treasure Trove of Heaven in Song dynasty, it was regarded as the Twenty-first cave of the country. In Ming dynasty, a Buddhist monk came here and modified the Taoism Temple to a Buddhist Temple, which called Yu Ping Zen Temple. Therefore, both Taoism and Buddhism had been here. However, in March, 2014, the temples caught fire and constructions built in Qing dynasty was lost.

=== Three Lakes ===
Three Lakes consist of Bai-shi Lake, Zhong-qian Lake and Long-shan Lake, which are all man-made lakes and built in 1950s-1960s. Bai-shi Lake was built in 1958, which was mainly used to prevent flooding and irrigation, but also generate electricity and supply water. The reservoir has a storage capacity of about 11.97 million cubic meters. After the completion of Bai-shi Lake, Zhong-Dian Lake began to be built and its storage capacity is 23.5 million cubic meters. Lakes here provide visitors with services like fishing, sightseeing, as well as going boating. Therefore, it becomes a part of Middle yandang Mountains Scenery Spots. It is said that the Chinese television drama Nirvana in Fire (Chinese: 琅琊榜) found views here at the first episode.

=== West Waterside ===
West Waterside is a valley with an approximately 200 meters' river and the bottom of river is flat and yellow, which is similar to the appearance of Chinese dragon. Thus, it is called Dragon Street (Chinese: 龙街). In this area, Bai-zhang Peak (Chinese: 百丈峰), Jade Screen Peak (Chinese: 玉屏峰), Rock Door (Chinese: 石门) and Rock Door Waterfall (Chinese: 石门瀑) become the main elements of the scenery spot. Bai-zhang Peak is a peak like a post which highs about 200 meters, and next to it is Jade Screen Peak (Chinese: 玉屏峰), which is similar to the Chinese folding screen.

Dragon Street

=== East Waterside ===
East Waterside is also a valley which lasts 3.5 kilometers long. According to County Annals of Yue Qing, it is said that at the southeast of Yu-zhen Peak, there is a place called East Waterside, including a river called East Dragon Street (Chinese: 东龙街), six ponds where Mei-yu Pond (Chinese: 梅雨潭), Hong-jing Pond (Chinese: 渹井潭) and Zhong Pond (Chinese: 钟潭) are the most famous, three peaks called Stele Peak (Chinese: 石碑峰), Rosy Clouds Peak (Chinese: 彩霞峰) and Mrs Rock Peak (Chinese: 石夫人峰), and a waterfall called Mei-yu Waterfall (Chinese: 梅雨瀑). A Chinese writer called Zhu Ziqing (Chinese: 朱自清) has traveled here and left an article named Green about Mei-yu Pond.

=== Phoenix Mountain ===
Mei-yu Pond

Phoenix Mountain is a mountain with approximately 500 meters, which lies on the periphery of the Bai-shi town and faces to Yu-zhen Peak. People regard it as the reflection of Yu-zhen Peak. There are tens of peaks here, including Hawk-mouth Peak (Chinese: 鹰嘴岩), Chuan-bi Peak (Chinese: 穿鼻岩), Ban-zhang (Chinese: 板障岩) and so on.

=== Yang-ba Hole ===
Yang-ba Hole (Chinese: 杨八洞) is a place built with Taoist style and was seen as the Nineteenth Cave of the country according to Taoism Book named Yun Ji Qi Qian (Chinese: 云笈七签). There are eight caves here, including Bao-guang (Chinese: 宝光), Guan-yin (Chinese: 观音), Tou-tian (Chinese: 透天), Tou-hai (Chinese: 透海), Long-gun (Chinese: 龙滚), Ba-xian (Chinese: 八仙), Hun-yuan (Chinese: 混元), Yu-chan (Chinese: 玉蟾). Guan-yin is a symbol of Buddhism while others are all important images of Taoist culture.

=== Liu-gong Valley ===
Liu-gong Valley also lies on the periphery of Middle Yandang Mountains. In 1132, the county magistrate of Yue Qing County organized workers to dig a canal and build the dykes and dams, which solved the flood and protect the benefits of citizens. To memorize him, people call the valley Liu-gong Valley. It is said that in the Jin dynasty (266–420), a literary celebrity named Ruan-fang (Chinese: 阮放) has lived in seclusion and Wang Xizhi(Chinese: 王羲之) came here to visited him. Therefore, many poets and calligraphers visited here and left their work.

== Gallery ==
Here are more photos about Middle Yandang Mountains.

Three Lakes 三湖

Three Lakes 三湖

East Waterside 东漈

East Waterside 东漈

Phoenix Temple 凤凰山道观

Phoenix Mountain 凤凰山

Mei-yu Pong 梅雨潭

West Waterside 西漈

West Waterside 西漈

Yu-zhen Peak 玉甄峰

Stream in Middle Yandang Mountains 山间小溪

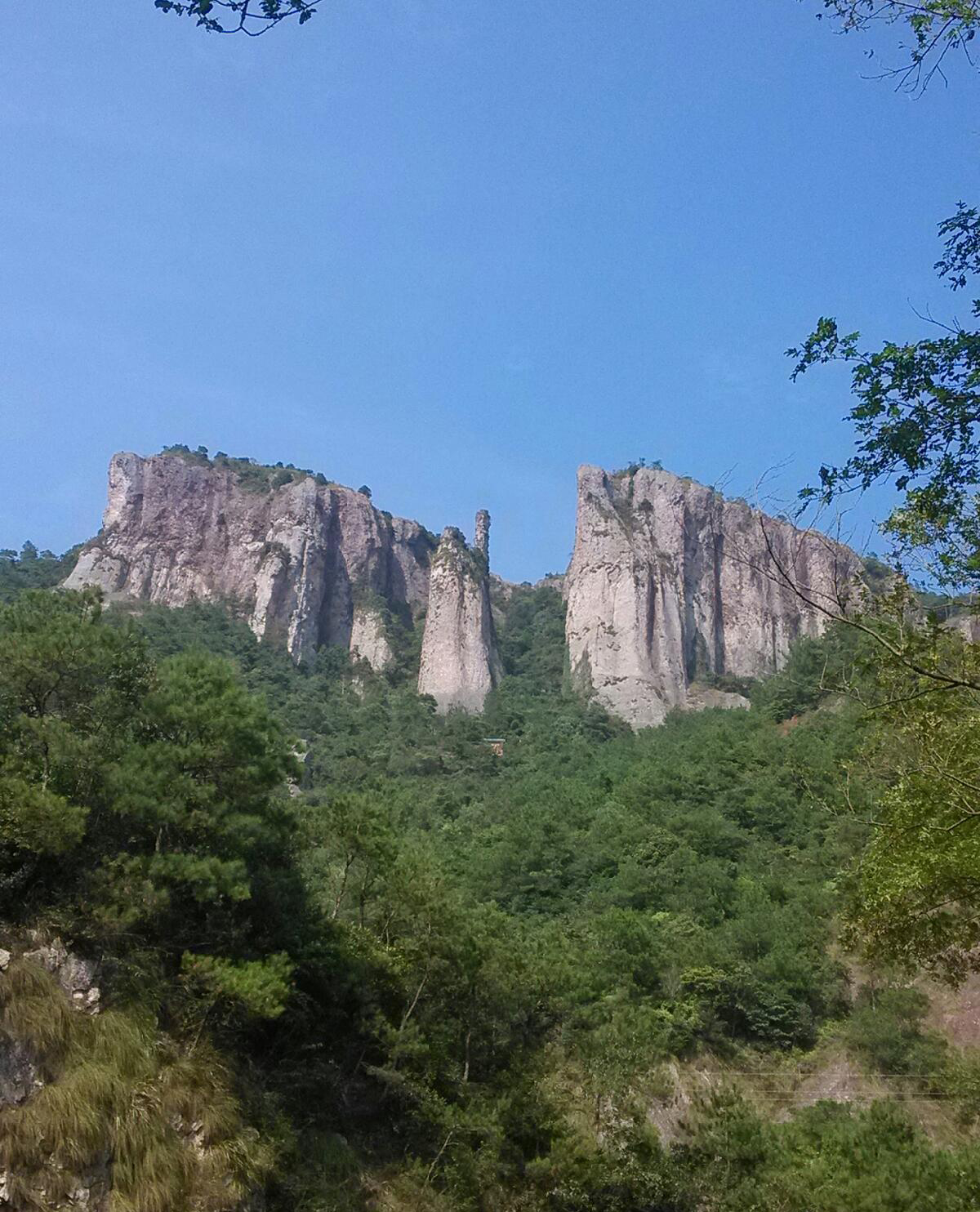
Bai-zhang Peak 百丈峰

Jade Screen Peak 玉屏峰

Xuan Guan 悬关
