= Tangxia, Zhejiang =

District of Rui'an, China

Tangxia is a district of Rui'an city, Zhejiang, China. Tangxia town is located in the northeast of Ruian City, on the banks of the river. To the east it is near the East China Sea; it is to the south of Ting Tin Street, to the west of Kumho Street Pan Dai, to the north of Ouhai District and Xianyan Street, and to the northeast of Longwan District and Haicheng (plum head) Street.

It has an area of 81.6 square kilometers and a population of 170,900 people (as of late 2010). The district has jurisdiction over 5 offices, 8 residential areas and 89 administrative villages. The town government is in the Shao Zhaicun, 12 kilometers away from Ruian city. Its main transport links are the 104 State Road, the G15 Shen Hai Expressway and Wen Ruitang river transit.

Monuments have been built in the beam days of prison monitoring Longxiang Temple, built in the Ming Hongwu years of coastal city defense.

In 2022, local officials organised the Tangxia Migrant Workers' Association, which grew to 1,500 members but was closed after a few months.
