= Rui'an =

Rui'an 瑞安市 Juian
- County-level city
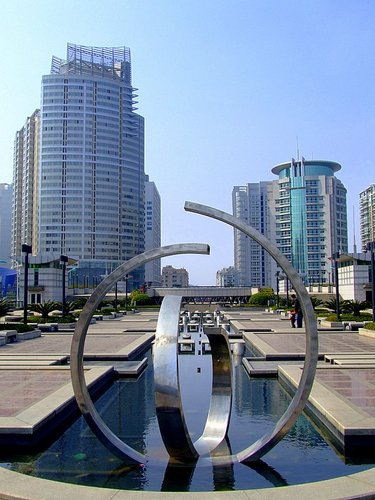
- Rui'an

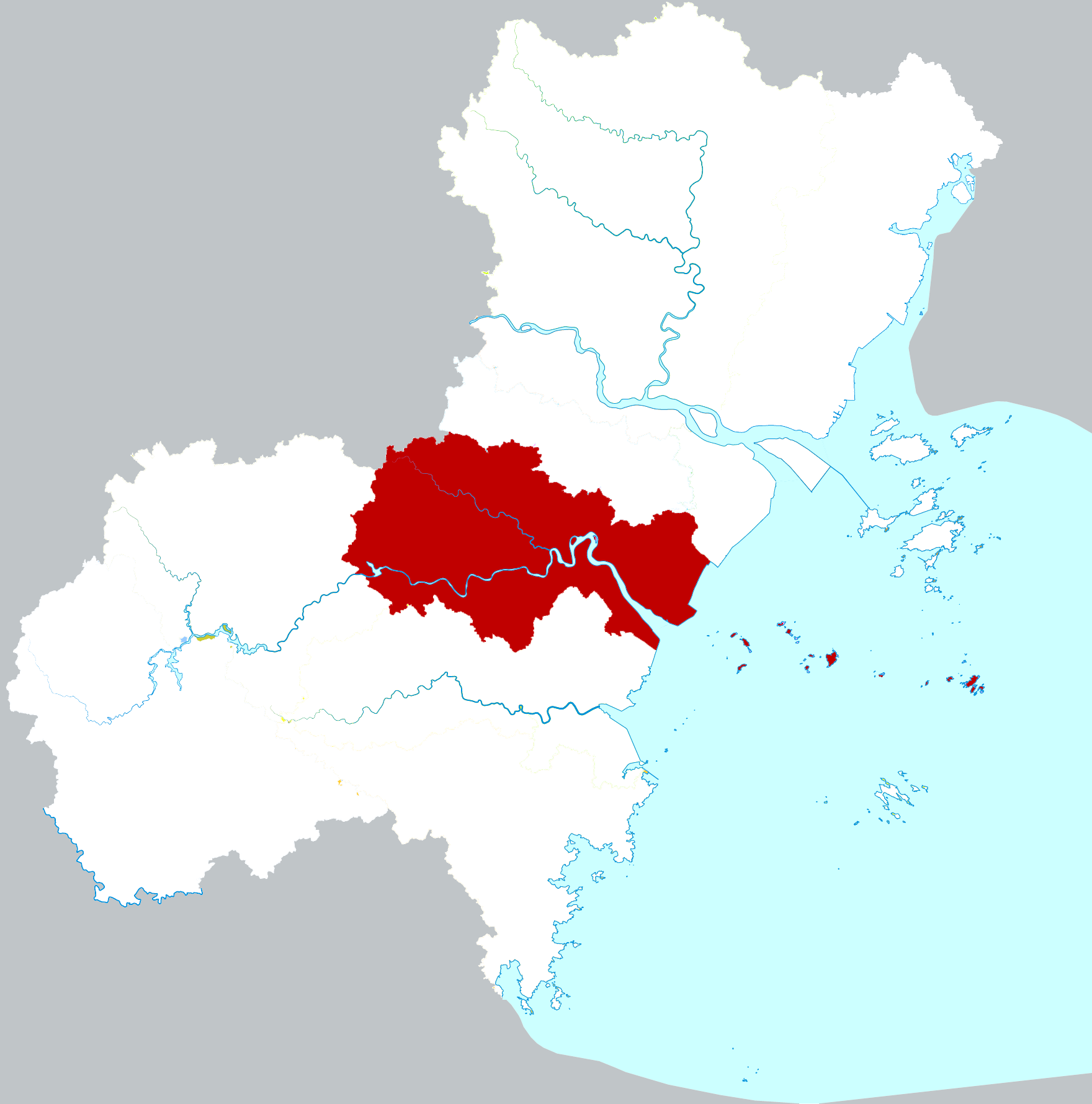
- Location of Rui'an in Wenzhou

- Location in Zhejiang
- Coordinates: 27°47′00″N 120°37′30″E
- Country: People's Republic of China
- Province: Zhejiang
- Prefecture-level city: Wenzhou

Area
  - Total: 1,271 km^{2} (491 sq mi)

Population
  - Total: 1,125,000
- Time zone: UTC+8 (China Standard)
- Area code: 0577

Rui'an is a county-level city under the jurisdiction of Wenzhou prefecture, Zhejiang province, China. It has a population of 1,125,000 people and covers a land area of 1,271 km^{2} (491 sq mi), 3,037 km^{2} (1,173 sq mi) when including water area. Natives of the city speak the Rui'an dialect of Wu Chinese.

As one of the trial counties and cities for comprehensive economic reforms, Rui'an was recognized as the fourteenth development zone by the State Council in 1987, and was subsequently listed as one of the first counties to be opened for foreign direct investment in 1988.

Rui'an is also one of the top 100 cities for economic growth in China with a burgeoning tourist industry. As of today, there are 49 towns and villages under the administration of Rui'an.

== History ==
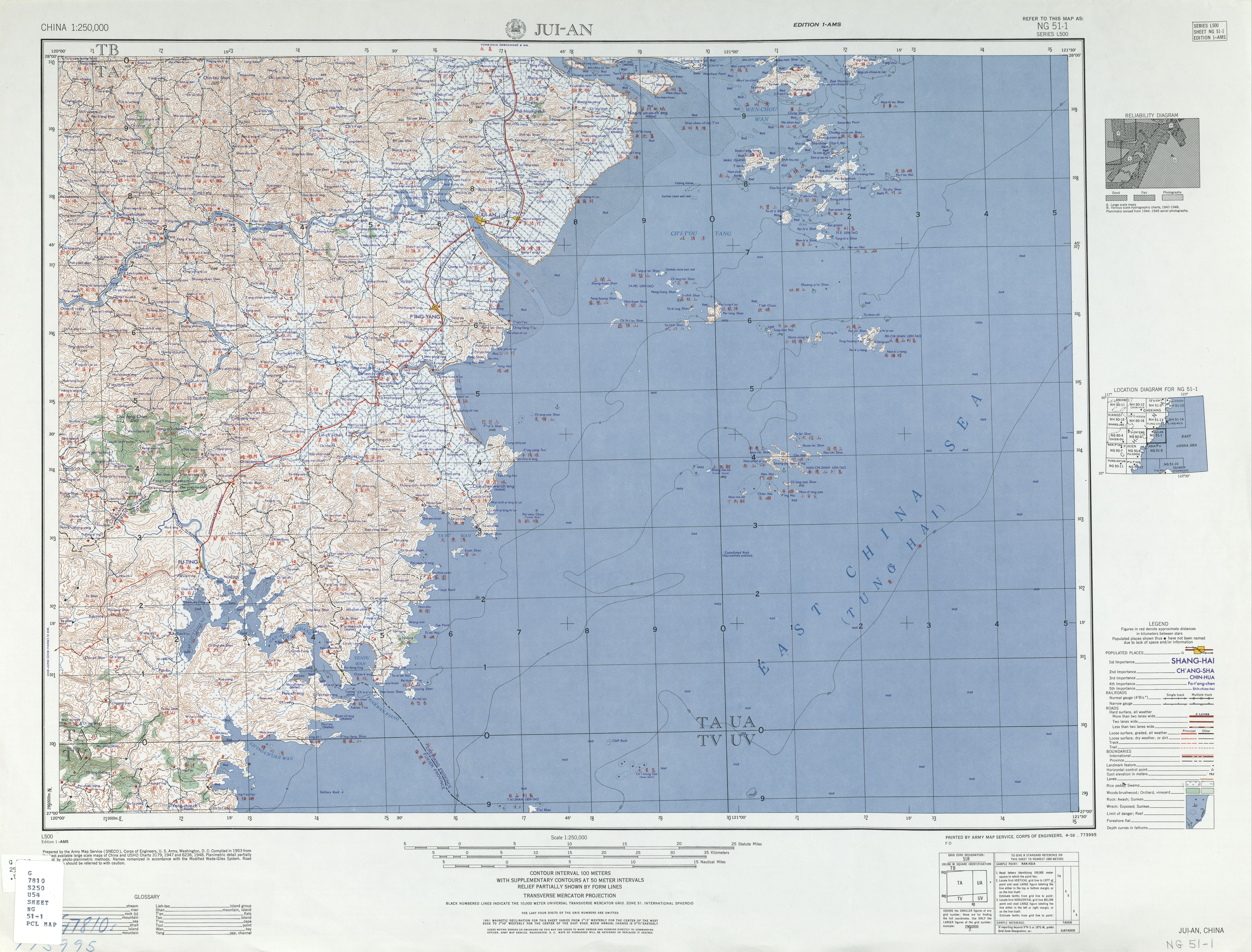
Rui'an (labeled as JUI-AN 瑞安) (1953)

Rui'an, also known as Meitou, has a history that goes back to about 2000 BC, when it became known for its machine production. The historic city began its trade and commerce in and given its current name in 675 AD.

== Administrative divisions ==
Subdistricts:

- Anyang Subdistrict (安阳街道)
- Jinhu Subdistrict (锦湖街道)
- Yuhai Subdistrict (玉海街道)
- Dongshan Subdistrict (东山街道)
- Shangwang Subdistrict (上望街道)
- Xincheng Subdistrict (莘塍街道)
- Tingtian Subdistrict (汀田街道)
- Feiyun Subdistrict (飞云街道)
- Xianfeng Subdistrict (仙降街道)
- Nanbin Subdistrict (南滨街道)

Towns:

- Tangxia (塘下镇)
- Mayu (马屿镇)
- Taoshan (陶山镇)
- Huling (湖岭镇)
- Gaolou (高楼镇)

== Climate ==
Climate data for Rui'an, elevation 38 m (125 ft), (1991–2020 normals, extremes 1981–present)
Month	Jan	Feb	Mar	Apr	May	Jun	Jul	Aug	Sep	Oct	Nov	Dec	Year
Record high °C (°F)	24.3 (75.7)	27.0 (80.6)	30.2 (86.4)	33.0 (91.4)	35.0 (95.0)	36.4 (97.5)	39.7 (103.5)	39.7 (103.5)	38.5 (101.3)	35.3 (95.5)	29.5 (85.1)	26.8 (80.2)	39.7 (103.5)
Mean daily maximum °C (°F)	12.6 (54.7)	13.4 (56.1)	16.2 (61.2)	21.0 (69.8)	25.3 (77.5)	28.7 (83.7)	32.2 (90.0)	32.1 (89.8)	29.3 (84.7)	25.3 (77.5)	20.5 (68.9)	15.4 (59.7)	22.7 (72.8)
Daily mean °C (°F)	8.8 (47.8)	9.5 (49.1)	12.2 (54.0)	16.8 (62.2)	21.5 (70.7)	25.2 (77.4)	28.6 (83.5)	28.4 (83.1)	25.7 (78.3)	21.3 (70.3)	16.5 (61.7)	11.2 (52.2)	18.8 (65.9)
Mean daily minimum °C (°F)	6.2 (43.2)	6.9 (44.4)	9.7 (49.5)	14.1 (57.4)	18.9 (66.0)	22.7 (72.9)	25.8 (78.4)	25.7 (78.3)	23.0 (73.4)	18.2 (64.8)	13.7 (56.7)	8.4 (47.1)	16.1 (61.0)
Record low °C (°F)	−3.1 (26.4)	−1.7 (28.9)	−0.8 (30.6)	4.1 (39.4)	10.2 (50.4)	12.8 (55.0)	18.9 (66.0)	20.7 (69.3)	13.9 (57.0)	6.6 (43.9)	1.3 (34.3)	−3.5 (25.7)	−3.5 (25.7)
Average precipitation mm (inches)	62.6 (2.46)	80.9 (3.19)	146.2 (5.76)	135.0 (5.31)	165.6 (6.52)	238.1 (9.37)	144.9 (5.70)	221.9 (8.74)	168.8 (6.65)	78.0 (3.07)	79.4 (3.13)	57.7 (2.27)	1,579.1 (62.17)
Average precipitation days (≥ 0.1 mm)	12.6	13.5	17.7	16.5	16.8	17.2	12.0	14.6	12.1	8.0	10.3	10.3	161.6
Average snowy days	1.3	1.2	0.2	0	0	0	0	0	0	0	0	0.3	3
Average relative humidity (%)	73	76	78	79	81	84	81	80	76	71	73	70	77
Mean monthly sunshine hours	98.8	92.7	102.6	120.2	124.8	117.9	224.3	207.2	161.6	159.7	114.1	116.8	1,640.7
Percentage possible sunshine	30	29	27	31	30	28	53	51	44	45	36	36	37
Source: China Meteorological Administration All-time Dec High all-time May record high

== Economy ==
Rui'an has been a relatively wealthy and prosperous city since ancient times. However, it was not until the initialization of Reform and Opening Up that Rui'an regained its momentum. The people of Rui'an have been pioneers in many fields, especially in the development of China's market economy in the form of joint-stock system.

They set up a household contract responsibility system, which would encourage the citizens to take lead in the household industries, and in turn invest their best effort to sell their products. Consequently, Rui'an experienced rapid economic development. The government induced the rural entrepreneurs and shareholders to cooperate effectively. Many kinds of economic systems that have significantly accelerated regional development have been experimented and introduced in Rui'an. Together, these approaches became known as the "Wenzhou Model" (温州模式), and is from 1980s to early 21st century one of the leading model for economic growth both in China and abroad.

In 2005, Rui'an ranked 39th in comprehensive economic strength among China's first 100 counties and cities. The 20-square-kilometre provincial-level economic development zone attracted investment for the development of Rui'an as a new urban area incorporating industry, trade, science, and technology. Rui'an is also known for its production of plastics and automotive accessories.

== Transportation ==
The infrastructure of Rui'an has improved, with an ever-quickening pace of urbanization. Now, it has modernized traffic control, transportation and communication systems. The Wenzhou Yongqiang Airport, a 10,000-ton seaport and the local railway station are each less than 30 kilometers from the city proper. The coastal highway and the No. 104 state highway which run through the city, and the Rui'an station on the Wenzhou–Fuzhou railway are a few significant examples of developments in transportation in Rui'an. The Rail Transit Line 2, which started operation on April 26, 2023, arrives in Rui'an.

== Resources ==
As a coastal city, Rui'an is rich in natural resources and has several salt mines. Situated about 100 nautical miles away from the estuary of Feiyunjiang, there lies the seabed rich in crude oil and natural gas, which are now being prospected and planned to be excavated.

== Culture ==
As of 2012, Rui'an had 595 registered religious sites and more than 1,200 unregistered folk religion temples.

== Notable people ==
- Li Qiang (李强, born July 1959), former Party Secretary of Shanghai and current Premier of the People's Republic of China
- Pan Wuyun (潘悟云, born March 1943) is a leading Chinese linguist and specialist in historical Chinese phonology
- Pan Feihong (潘飞鸿, born 1989), Chinese rower from Rui'an who represented her country at the 2016 Summer Olympics
- Zhang Wenhong (张文宏, born 1969) is a Chinese doctor
- Zeng Liansong (曾联松, born 1917) was the designer of the Flag of the People's Republic of China
