= Lucheng, Wenzhou =

District of Wenzhou, Zhejiang, China

Lucheng 鹿城区
- District
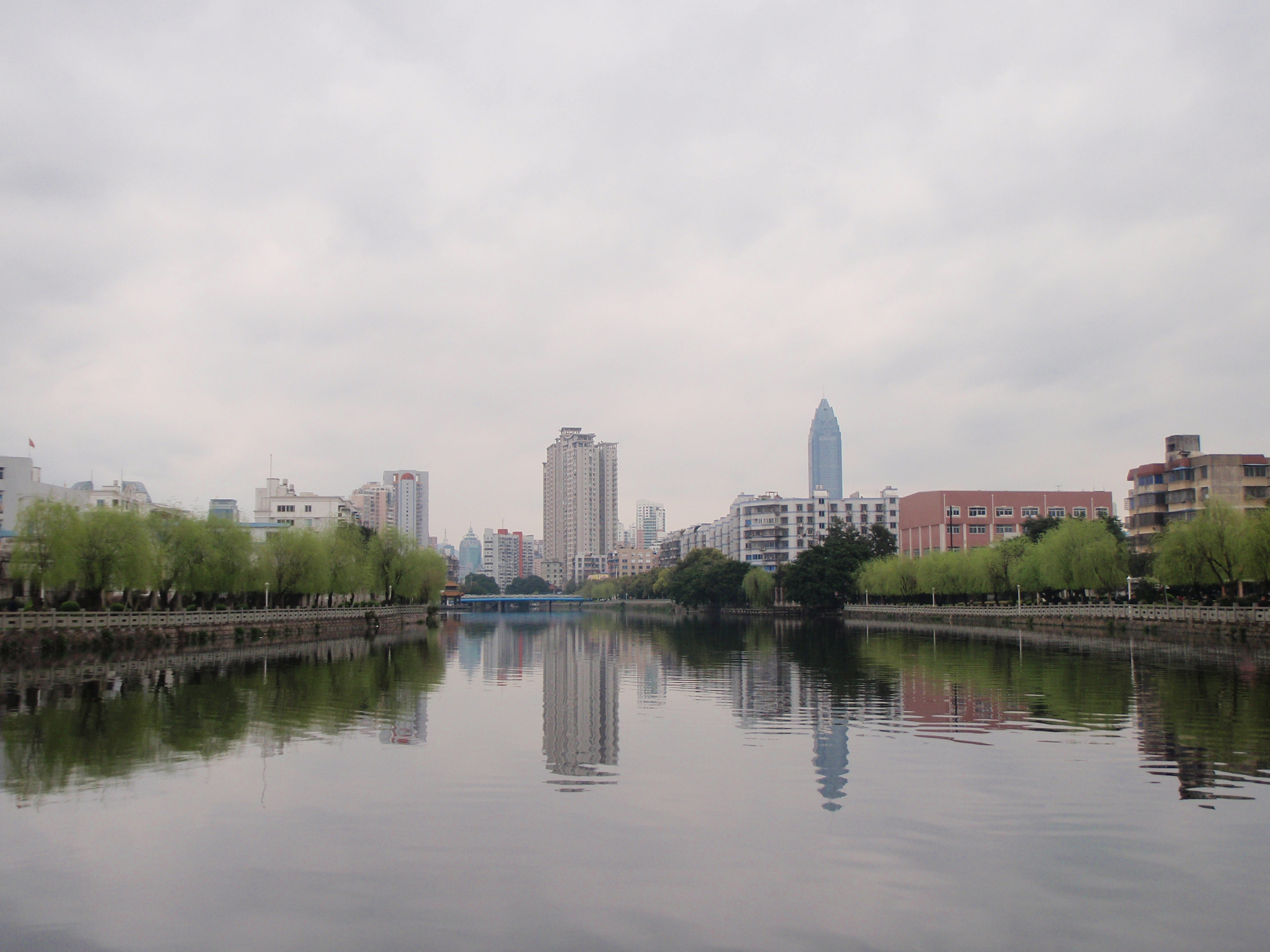
- Lucheng

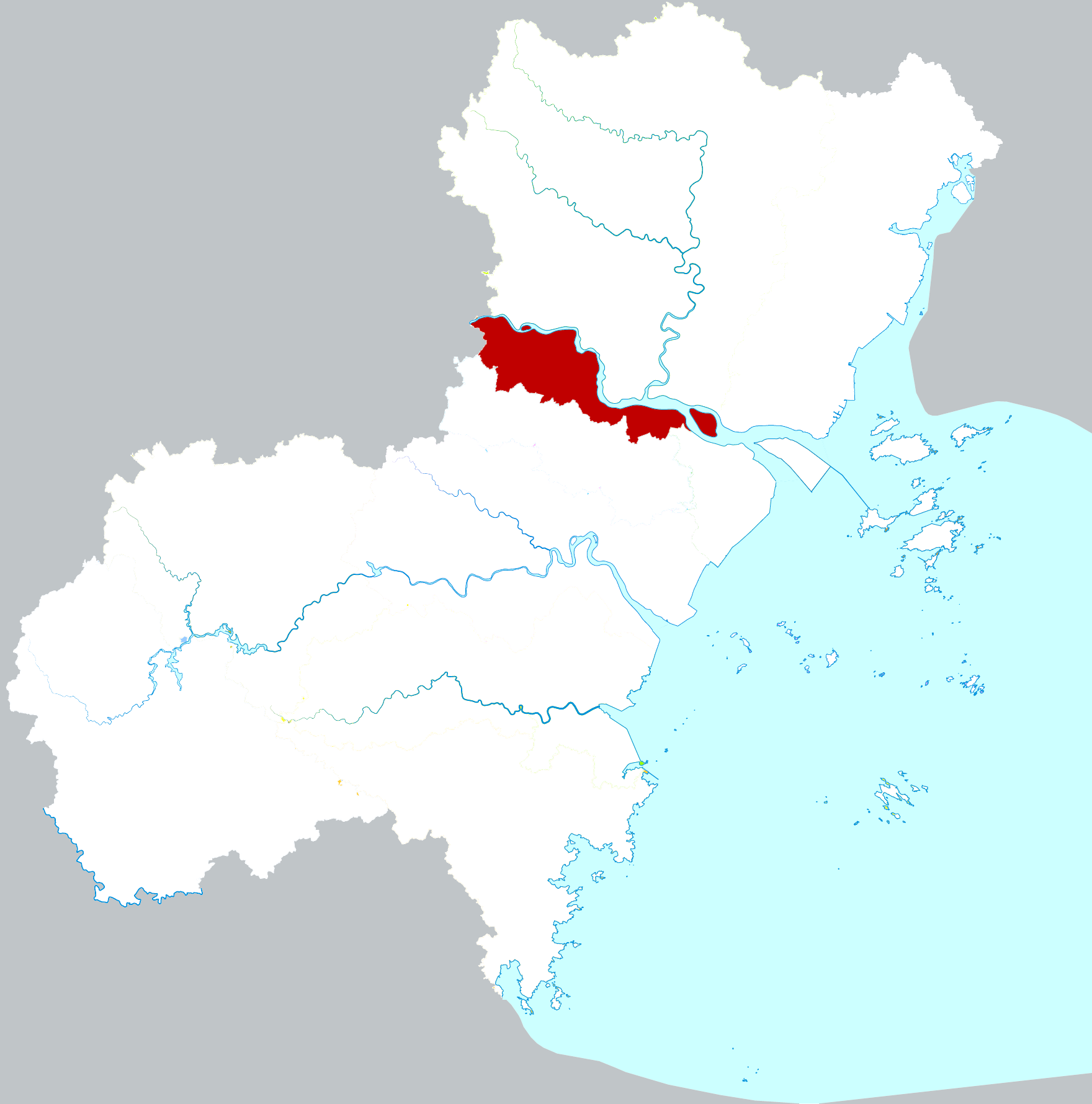
- Location of Lucheng District within Wenzhou

- Location in Zhejiang
- Coordinates: 28°01′11″N 120°39′18″E
- Country: People's Republic of China
- Province: Zhejiang
- Prefecture-level city: Wenzhou

Area
  - Total: 290.47 km^{2} (112.15 sq mi)

Population (2020)
  - Total: 1,167,100
  - Density: 4,018.0/km^{2} (10,406/sq mi)
- Time zone: UTC+8 (China Standard)

Lucheng District (Chinese: 鹿城区; pinyin: Lùchéng Qū; Wenzhounese: luo zen) is a district of the city of Wenzhou, Zhejiang province, China. It is the central district and government seat of Wenzhou.

It has an area of 294.38 km^{2} (113.66 sq mi) and a population of 1,293,300 residents as of 2010. The other 2 districts of the Wenzhou urban area are Longwan and Ouhai.

== History ==
Lucheng is the historic urban core of Wenzhou and where the walled city was located. The history of the Wenzhou city walls is traditionally traced back to Guo Pu of the Eastern Jin dynasty. According to legend, after the establishment of Yongjia Commandery in 323, Guo Pu, reputedly skilled in the arts of the Five Elements, astronomy and divination, was invited to select an auspicious site for the construction of the city walls. He is said to have first considered building on the north bank at the confluence of the Ou River and the Nanxi River, but found the soil there too light. Crossing to the south bank, he observed nine hills arranged in a pattern resembling the Big Dipper and therefore chose this location as the city site.

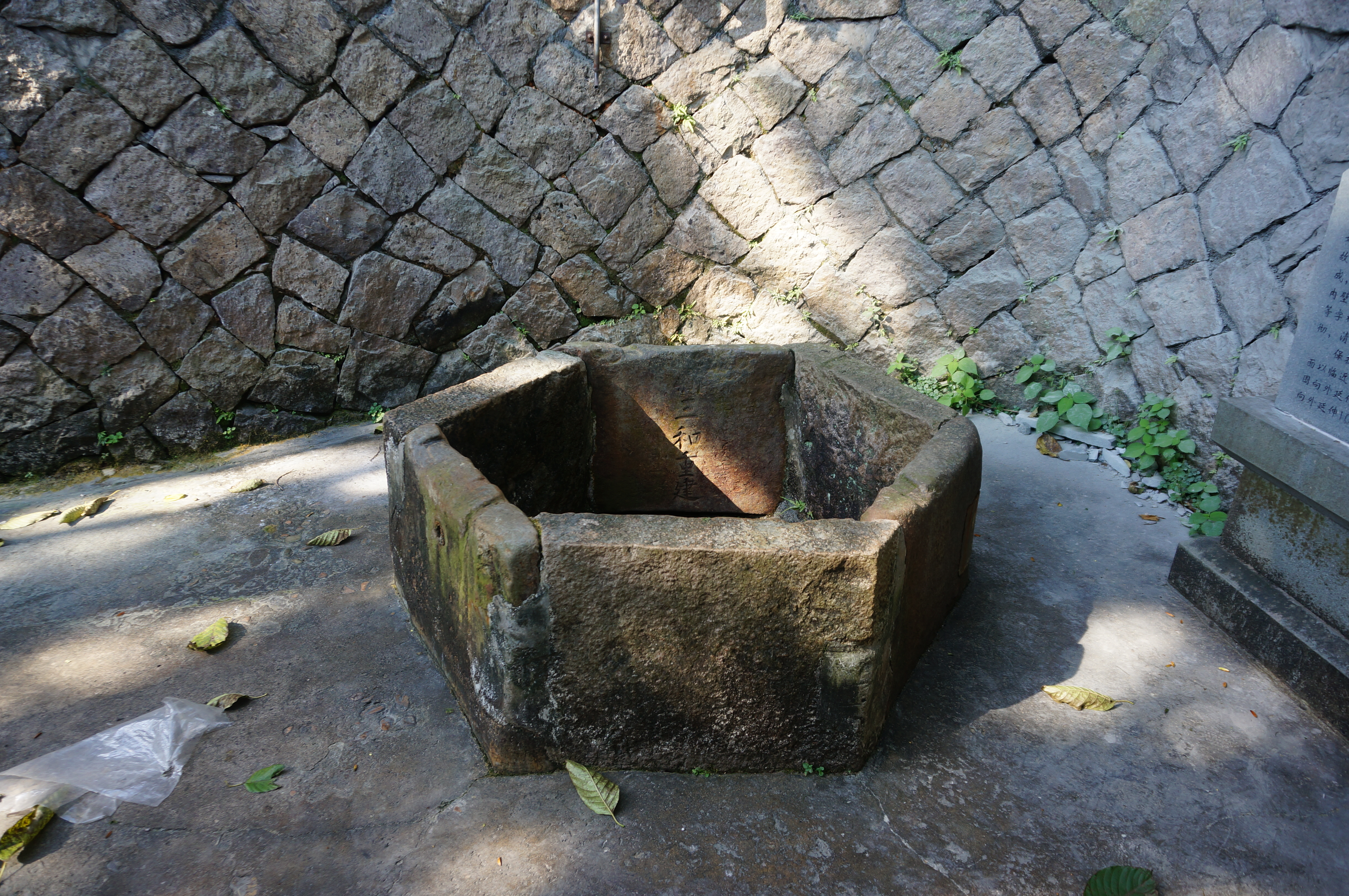
One of the Twenty Eight Mansions wells within the walled city.

The boundaries of the walls were determined in accordance with the surrounding topography. Haitan Hill formed the north eastern corner, Guogong Hill the north western corner, Songtai Hill the south western corner, and Jigu Hill the south eastern corner, while the Ou River served as a natural moat to the north. These four hills were associated with the four stars of the Dipper's bowl, and Huagai Hill was said to "lock" the mouth of the constellation. Additional hills to the south corresponded to the handle of the Dipper, giving rise to the sobriquet "Dipper City". Within the walls, twenty eight wells were reportedly dug to correspond with the twenty eight lunar mansions. During the construction, an auspicious omen of a white deer carrying flowers was said to have appeared, leading to another nickname, "White Deer City" or Lucheng.

These legends have been widely transmitted, and many local names are said to derive from them, including "Guogong Hill" at the north western corner of the city walls, Lucheng, the present urban core of Wenzhou, and the "Nine Hills Book Society", a Song literary society in Wenzhou that produced the earliest extant Nanxi play, Zhang Xie the Top Graduate. Some scholars, however, note that while the geographical descriptions in the story, such as the configuration of surrounding hills, may be credible, the account of Guo Pu divining the site did not appear until the Southern Song period and is likely a later legend. In fact, the establishment of a fortified settlement on the south bank of the Ou River may date back earlier, possibly to the Dong'ou Kingdom.
