= Dongtou, Wenzhou =

Dongtou 洞头区 Tungtou
- District
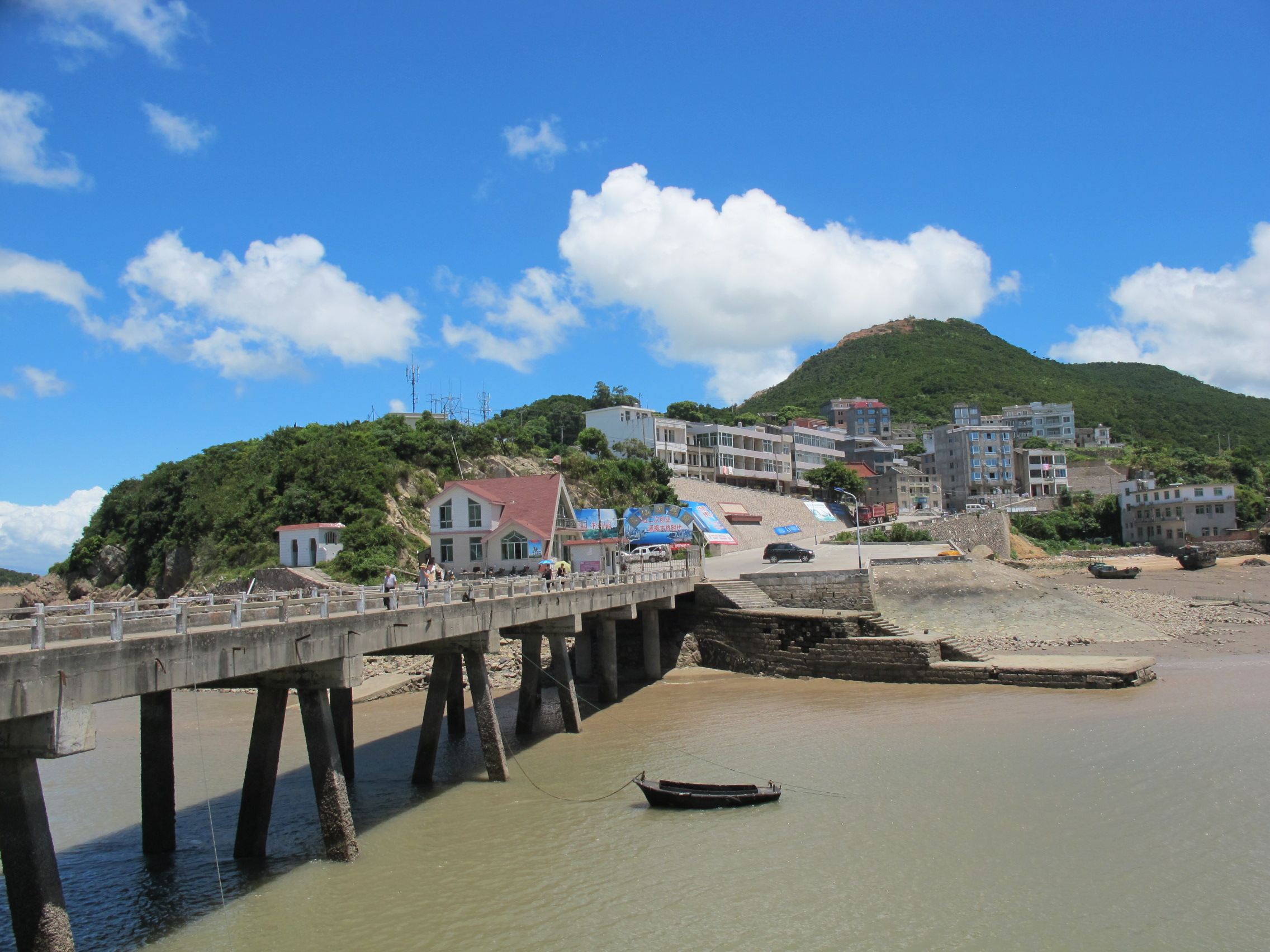
- Dongtou

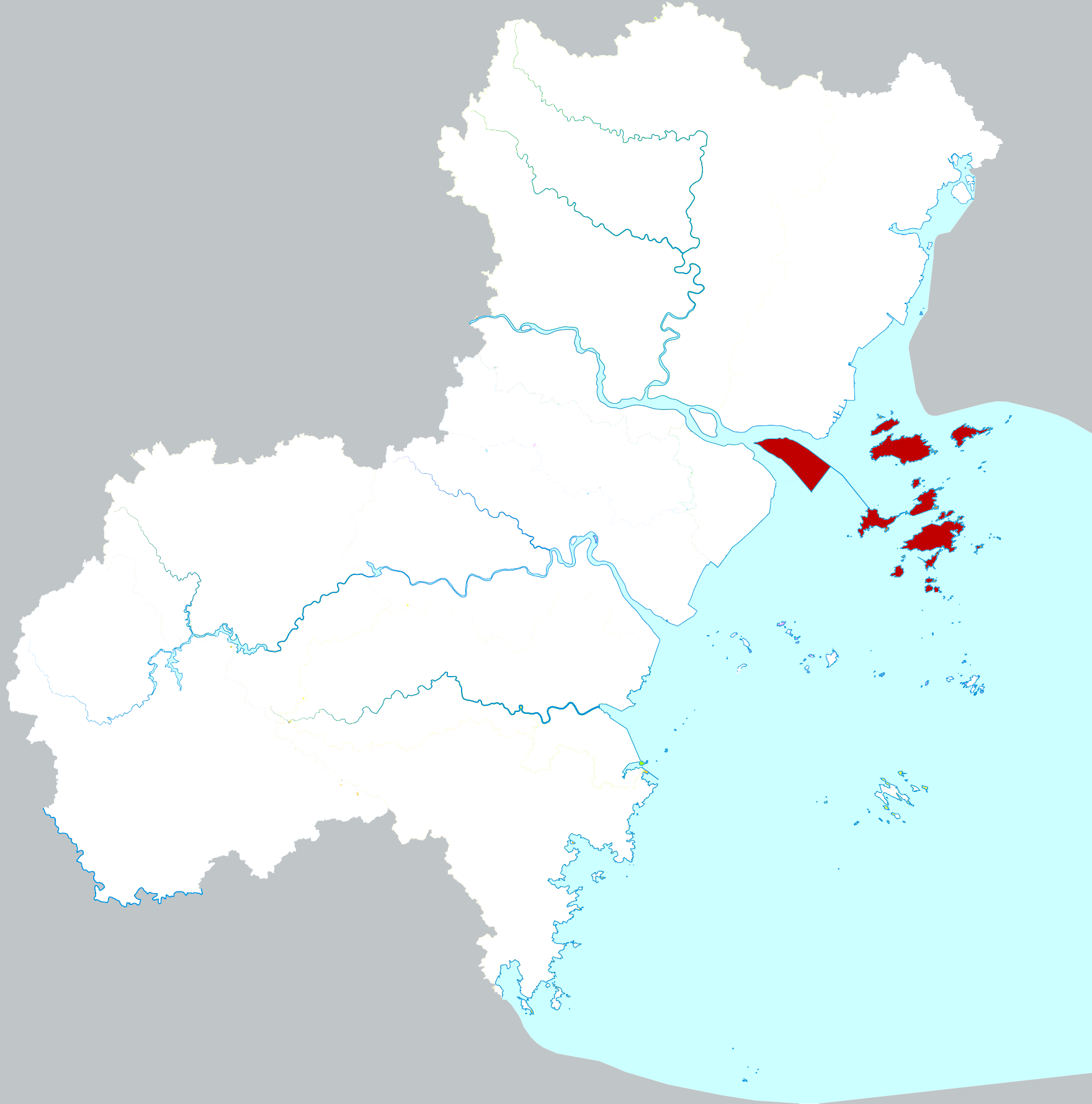
- Location in Wenzhou

- Location in Zhejiang
- Coordinates: 27.836°N 121.157°E
- Country: People's Republic of China
- Province: Zhejiang
- Prefecture-level city: Wenzhou

Area
  - Total: 2,700.3 km^{2} (1,042.6 sq mi)
  - Land: 100.3 km^{2} (38.7 sq mi)
  - Water: 2,600 km^{2} (1,000 sq mi)

Population (2012)
  - Total: 130,600
  - Density: 1,302.1/km^{2} (3,372/sq mi)
- Time zone: UTC+8 (China Standard)
- Website: www.dongtou.gov.cn

Dongtou District (Note: Pronunciation:) (simplified Chinese: 洞头区; traditional Chinese: 洞頭區; pinyin: Dòngtóu Qū) is a district consisting of 168 islands in the East China Sea, and is under the jurisdiction of prefecture-level city of Wenzhou, in southern Zhejiang province, China. It has a total area of 2,700.3 km^{2} (1,042.6 sq mi), of which 100.3 km^{2} (38.7 sq mi) is land, and, as of 2012, had a population of 130,600. It was known as Dongtou County (洞头县) until 2 September 2015, when, with the approval of the State Council, it was converted to a district.

== Transport ==
It is served by 4 stations on Line S1 (Wenzhou Metro): Lingkun, Oujiangkou, Ouhua and Shuang'ou Avenue.

== Administrative divisions ==
Subdistricts:

- Bei'ao Subdistrict (北岙街道), Yuanjue Subdistrict (元觉街道), Dongping Subdistrict (东屏街道), Niyu Subdistrict (霓屿街道)

The only town is Damen (大门镇), and the only township is Luxi Township (鹿西乡)

== Climate ==
Climate data for Dongtou, elevation 69 m (226 ft), (1991–2020 normals, extremes 1977–present)
Month	Jan	Feb	Mar	Apr	May	Jun	Jul	Aug	Sep	Oct	Nov	Dec	Year
Record high °C (°F)	20.9 (69.6)	23.2 (73.8)	25.3 (77.5)	28.1 (82.6)	31.6 (88.9)	32.2 (90.0)	33.9 (93.0)	36.3 (97.3)	34.9 (94.8)	31.4 (88.5)	27.3 (81.1)	23.8 (74.8)	36.3 (97.3)
Mean daily maximum °C (°F)	10.9 (51.6)	11.5 (52.7)	14.3 (57.7)	18.8 (65.8)	23.3 (73.9)	26.4 (79.5)	29.7 (85.5)	30.4 (86.7)	28.2 (82.8)	23.9 (75.0)	19.1 (66.4)	13.8 (56.8)	20.9 (69.5)
Daily mean °C (°F)	8.3 (46.9)	8.7 (47.7)	11.3 (52.3)	15.7 (60.3)	20.5 (68.9)	24.0 (75.2)	27.3 (81.1)	27.9 (82.2)	25.6 (78.1)	21.3 (70.3)	16.6 (61.9)	11.1 (52.0)	18.2 (64.7)
Mean daily minimum °C (°F)	6.3 (43.3)	6.7 (44.1)	9.2 (48.6)	13.5 (56.3)	18.4 (65.1)	22.3 (72.1)	25.5 (77.9)	26.0 (78.8)	23.7 (74.7)	19.3 (66.7)	14.6 (58.3)	9.0 (48.2)	16.2 (61.2)
Record low °C (°F)	−3.6 (25.5)	−0.4 (31.3)	−1.0 (30.2)	4.7 (40.5)	9.4 (48.9)	16.2 (61.2)	18.5 (65.3)	21.1 (70.0)	16.8 (62.2)	11.5 (52.7)	3.5 (38.3)	−1.8 (28.8)	−3.6 (25.5)
Average precipitation mm (inches)	64.3 (2.53)	80.7 (3.18)	133.5 (5.26)	130.5 (5.14)	154.5 (6.08)	196.5 (7.74)	110.1 (4.33)	192.3 (7.57)	141.2 (5.56)	65.8 (2.59)	74.4 (2.93)	58.8 (2.31)	1,402.6 (55.22)
Average precipitation days (≥ 0.1 mm)	11.8	12.9	17.7	16.1	14.9	15.6	9.4	11.4	11.1	6.6	10.1	9.9	147.5
Average snowy days	1.2	1.3	0.4	0	0	0	0	0	0	0	0	0.4	3.3
Average relative humidity (%)	73	77	81	83	85	89	87	84	78	73	74	71	80
Mean monthly sunshine hours	108.9	98.1	111.7	127.4	136.8	134.1	242.9	238.9	194.3	189.8	134.9	131.2	1,849
Percentage possible sunshine	33	31	30	33	33	32	58	59	53	54	42	41	42
Source: China Meteorological Administrationall-time extreme temperaturesAll-time Oct extreme

== Economy ==
Dongtou possesses the second-largest fishery in Zhejiang, reaching an area of about 4,800 km^{2} (1,900 sq mi), and is known as the "Hijiki capital of China" (中国羊栖菜之乡) as well as the "Seaweed capital of Zhejiang" (浙江紫菜之乡).
