= Ouhai, Wenzhou =

District of Wenzhou, Zhejiang, China

Ouhai 瓯海区
- District
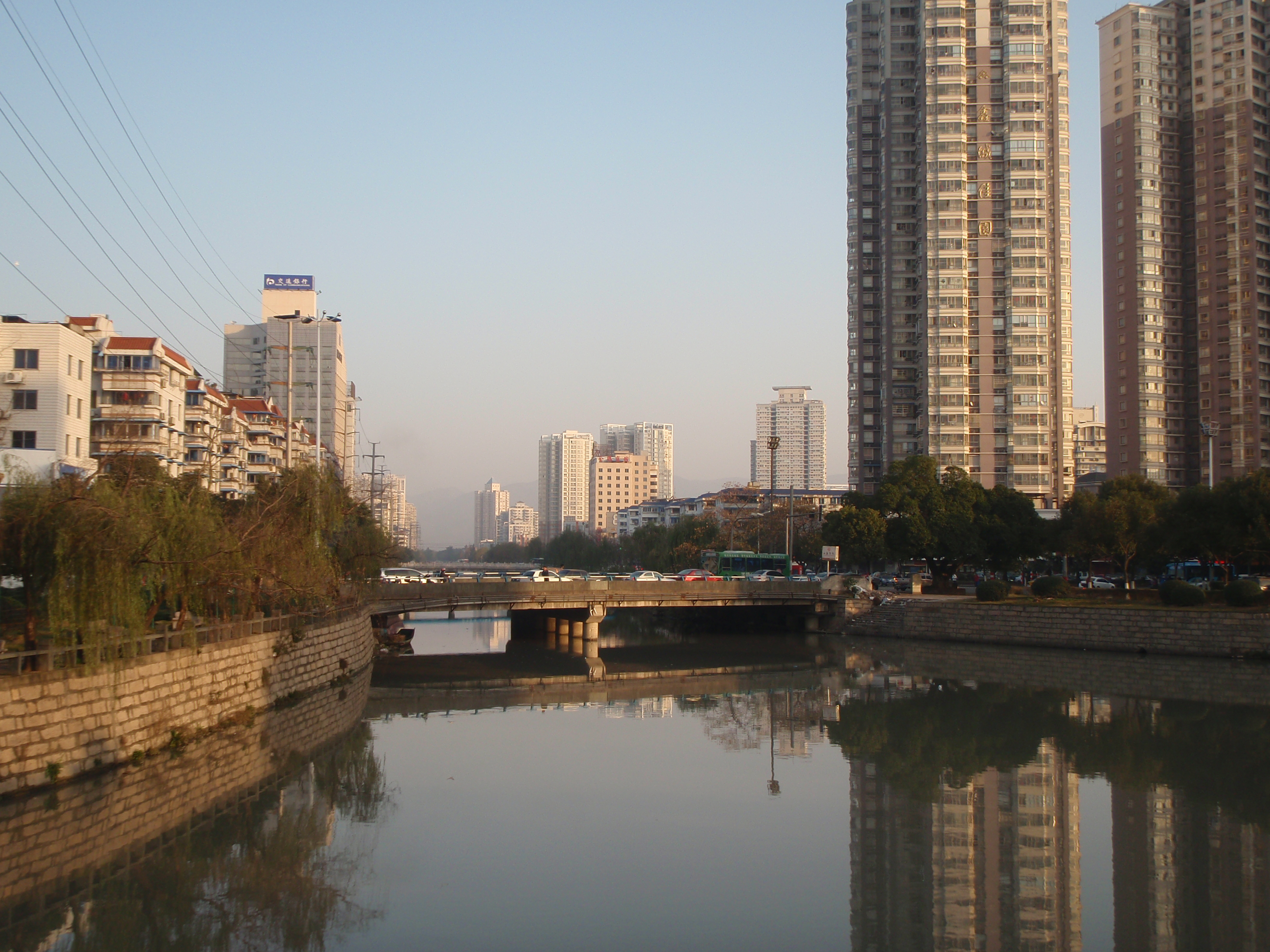
- Ouhai

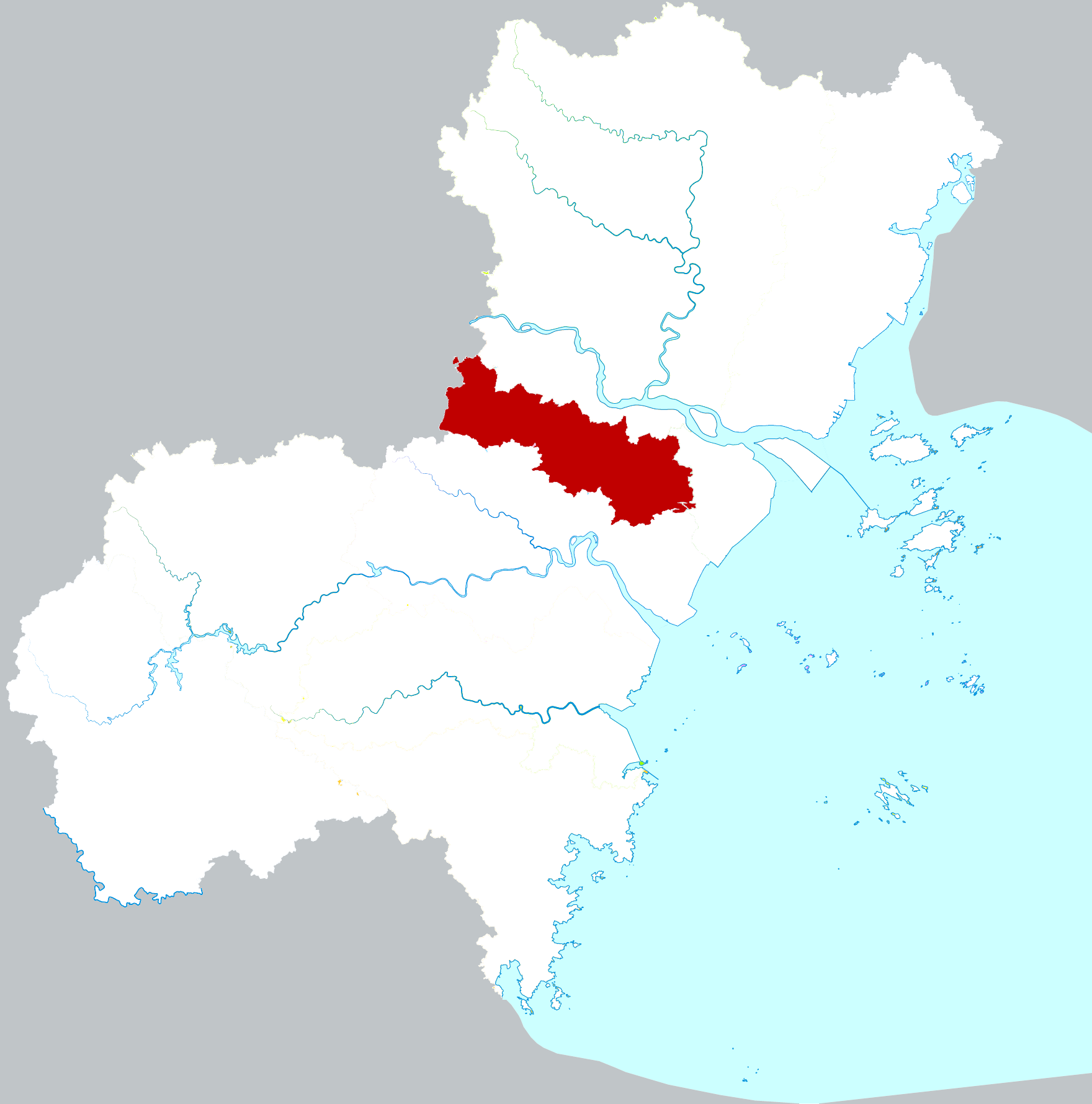
- Location of Ouhai District within Wenzhou

- Location in Zhejiang
- Coordinates: 27°58′01″N 120°36′55″E
- Country: People's Republic of China
- Province: Zhejiang
- Prefecture-level city: Wenzhou

Area
  - Total: 466.28 km^{2} (180.03 sq mi)

Population (2020)
  - Total: 978,200
  - Density: 2,098/km^{2} (5,433/sq mi)
- Time zone: UTC+8 (China Standard)

Ouhai District (simplified Chinese: 瓯海区; traditional Chinese: 甌海區; pinyin: Ōuhǎi Qū) is a district of Wenzhou, Zhejiang. It is an outlying district of Wenzhou urban area (温州市区; 溫州市區).

It has a population of 386,000 and occupies 614.5 km^{2} (237.3 sq mi).

== Administrative divisions ==
Twelve subdistricts:

- Louqiao Subdistrict (娄桥街道), Xinqiao Subdistrict (新桥街道), Wutian Subdistrict (梧田街道), Jingshan Subdistrict (景山街道), Chashan Subdistrict (茶山街道), Sanyang Subdistrict (三垟街道), Nanbaixiang Subdistrict (南白象街道), Quxi Subdistrict (瞿溪街道), Panqiao Subdistrict (潘桥街道), Guoxi Subdistrict (郭溪街道), Li'ao Subdistrict (丽岙街道), Xianyan Subdistrict (仙岩街道)

The only town is Zeya (泽雅镇)

== Culture ==
An essay written by Zhu Ziqing on the beauty of Meiyu Pond (梅雨潭) and waterfall in the Middle Yandang Mountains in Xianyan Subdistrict, Ouhai District after his visits to the area in 1923 is among the sixty potential reading selections test takers may be asked to read for the Putonghua Proficiency Test.
