= Wenzhou Museum =

Coordinates: 27°59′31″N 120°41′39″E

- 温州博物馆
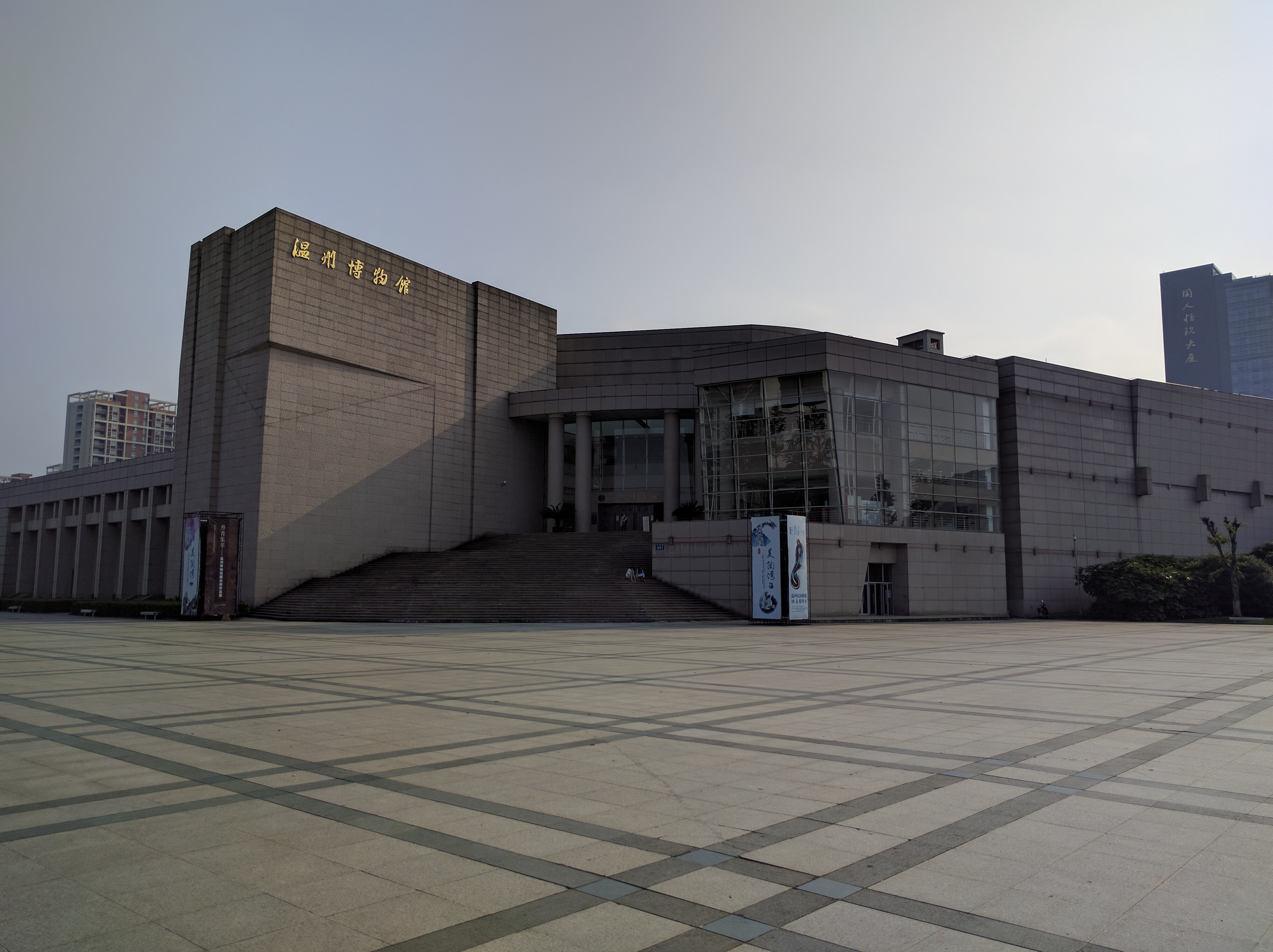
- Established: 1958
- Location: Shifu Road, Lucheng District, Wenzhou, Zhejiang Province, China
- Type: General museum
- Website: https://www.wzmuseum.cn

Wenzhou Museum (simplified Chinese: 温州博物馆; traditional Chinese: 溫州博物館; pinyin: Wēnzhōu Bówùguǎn) is a museum run by the city of Wenzhou, located on Shifu Road, Lucheng District.

== Description ==
Wenzhou Museum was established in May 1958 at Xingqing Temple (兴庆寺), Jiangxin Islet, with Fang Jiekan as its first director. It was Wenzhou's first general museum. During the Cultural Revolution the museum was closed and incorporated into Wenzhou Library, but in 1981 it was established again as Wenzhou Museum.

In early October 2003, Wenzhou Museum opened a new location on the west side of Shiji Plaza on a trial basis. After a month, it was closed again to be improved, then officially opened on 12 January 2004. Entry became free in March 2008. The new location occupies an area of about 2.34 hectares, and the building's floor area is 26,000 square meters, with an exhibition area of 12,000 square meters. The exhibits include history, painting, calligraphy, pottery, nature, handicrafts, the Wang Weixin Copperplate Exhibition Room, and temporary exhibits. The architectural design of the new museum was inspired by the Yandang Mountains. The entrance is decorated with banyan tree sculptures, and on the granite walls of the lobby are nine hanging copper sculptures depicting Chinese myths: Pangu separating heaven and earth, Nüwa mending the sky, Kuafu chasing the sun, Jingwei filling the sea, Hou Yi shooting at the suns, Chang'e flying to the moon, Shennong and Fuxi, Suiren making fire, and Yu the Great taming the floods. The history section was remodeled starting in 2015, and was reopened on a trial basis on 21 January 2017, then officially opened on International Museum Day, 18 May 2017.

The museum has a collection of more than 30,000 artifacts in 20 categories, including bronzeware, pottery, painted sculptures, lacquerware, brick carving, and painting and calligraphy. Its most distinctive items are pottery, painted sculptures, paintings, and calligraphy.

In 2017, Wenzhou Museum was appraised by the China Museums Association and included in batch three of the national first-grade museums of China.

== Gallery ==
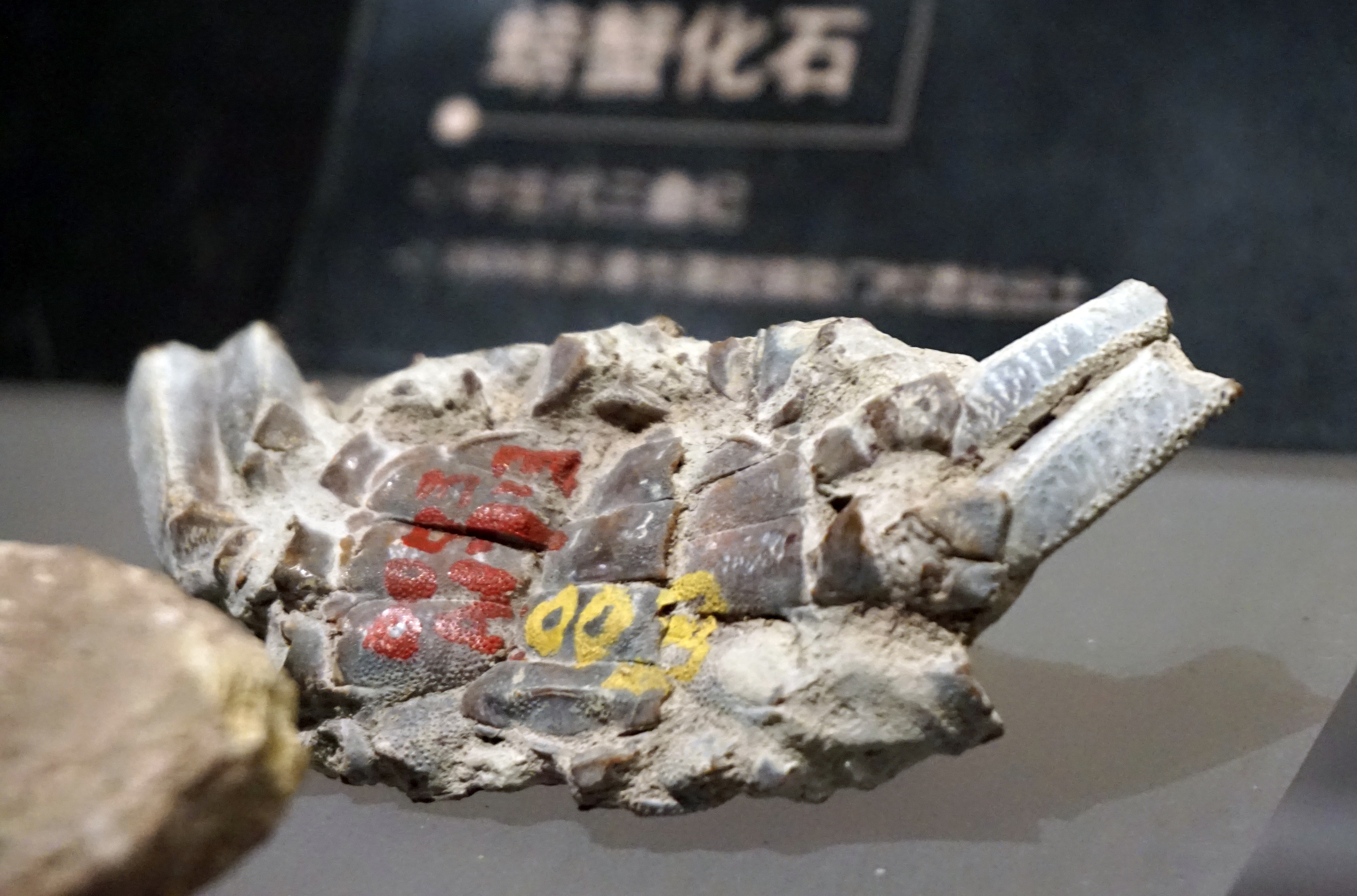
Fossil of a crab from the Mesozoic Era

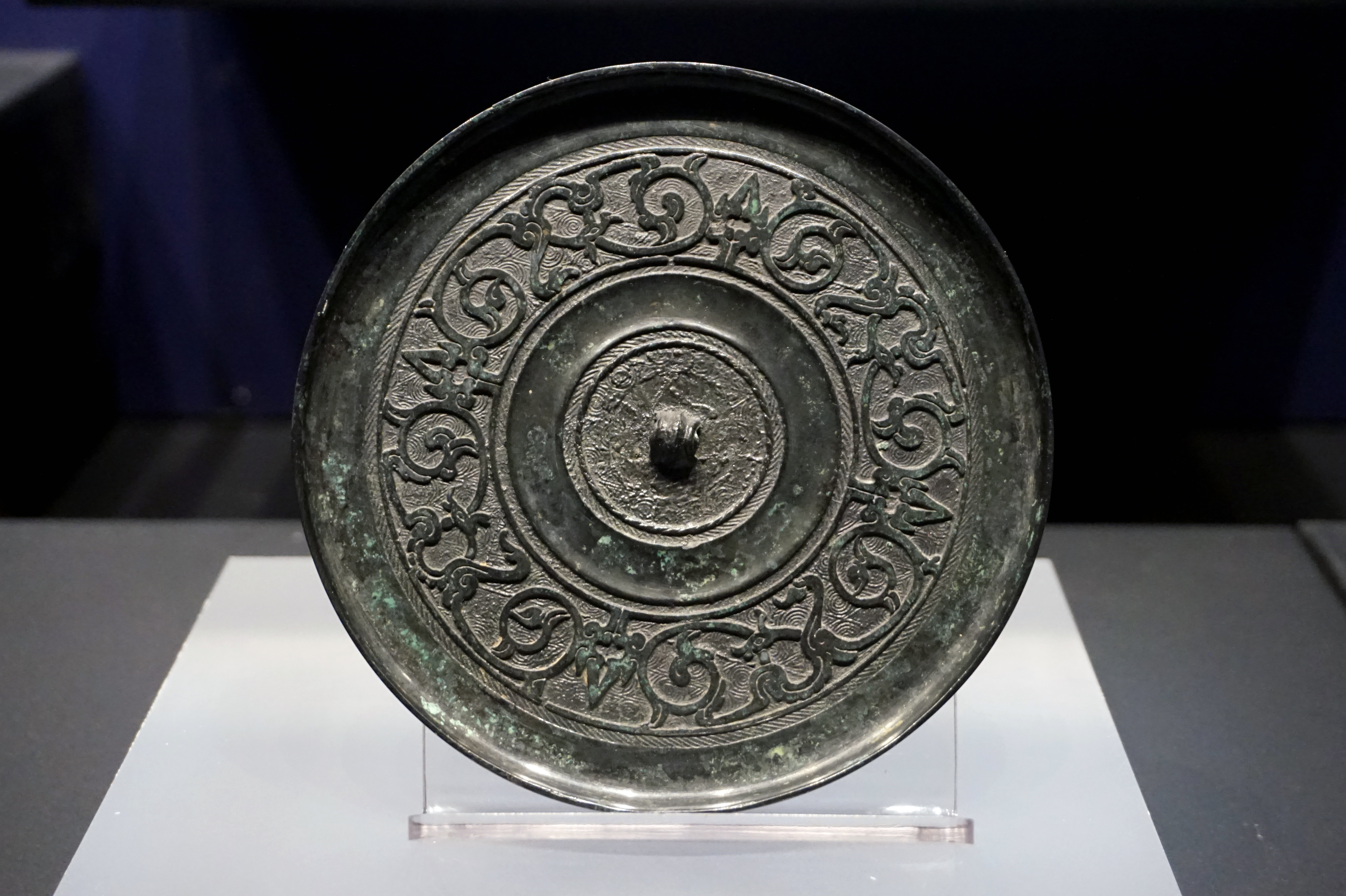
Bronze mirror with a panlong design from the Warring States period

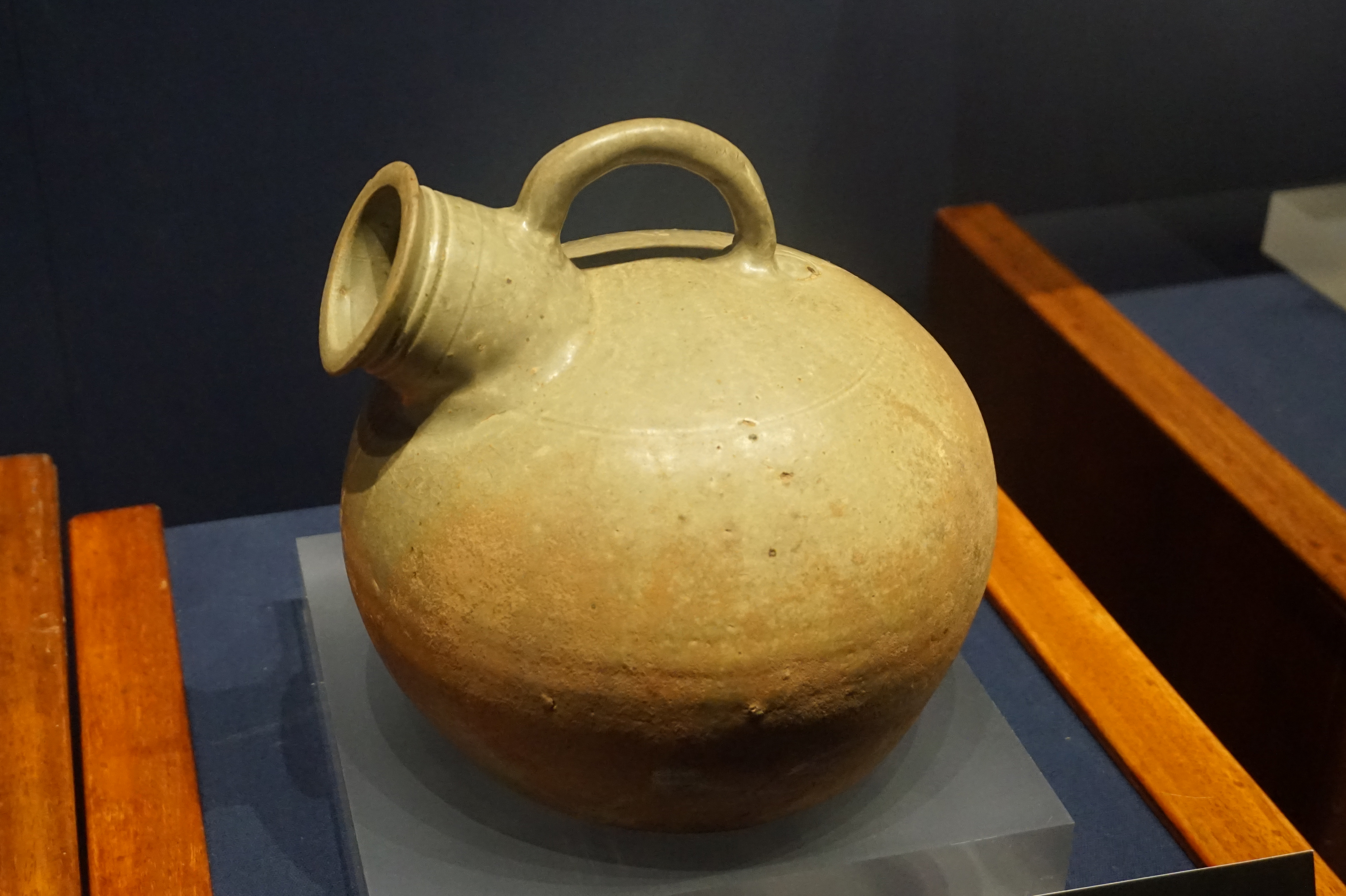
Celadon chamber pot from the Western Jin dynasty

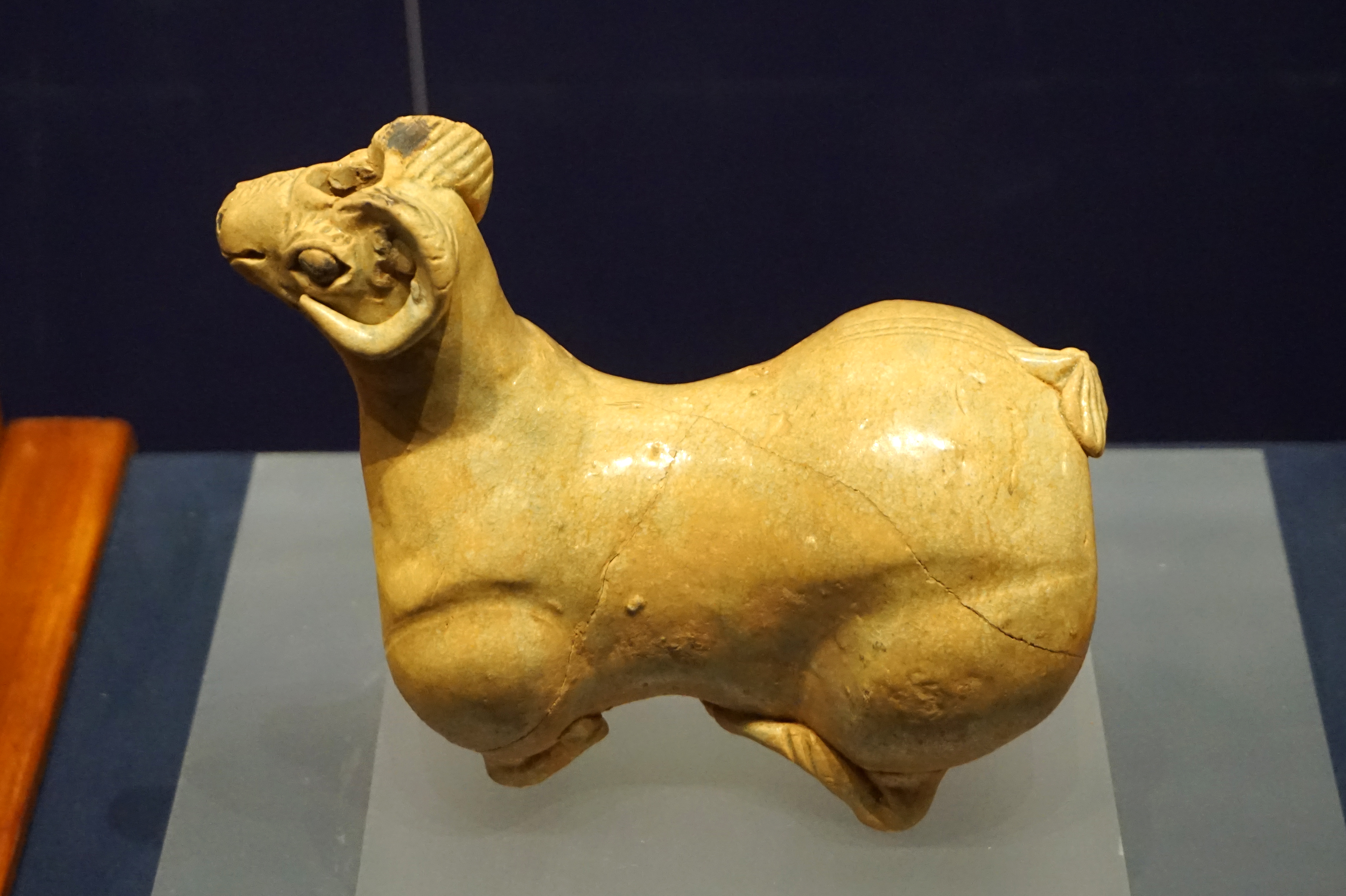
Ouyao celadon sheep from the Eastern Jin dynasty

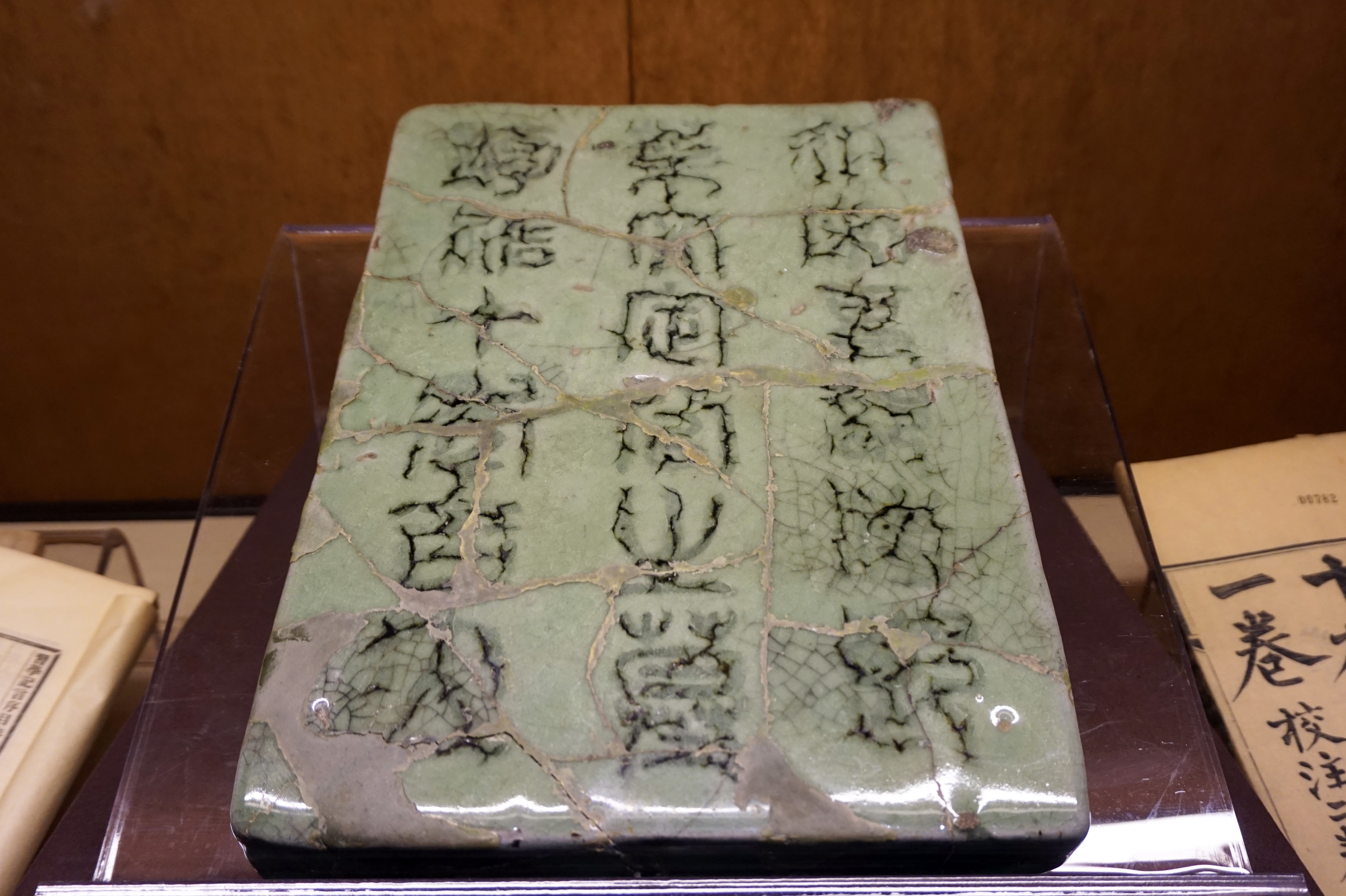
Inscription from the tomb of Ye Shi (Longquan celadon, Southern Song dynasty)

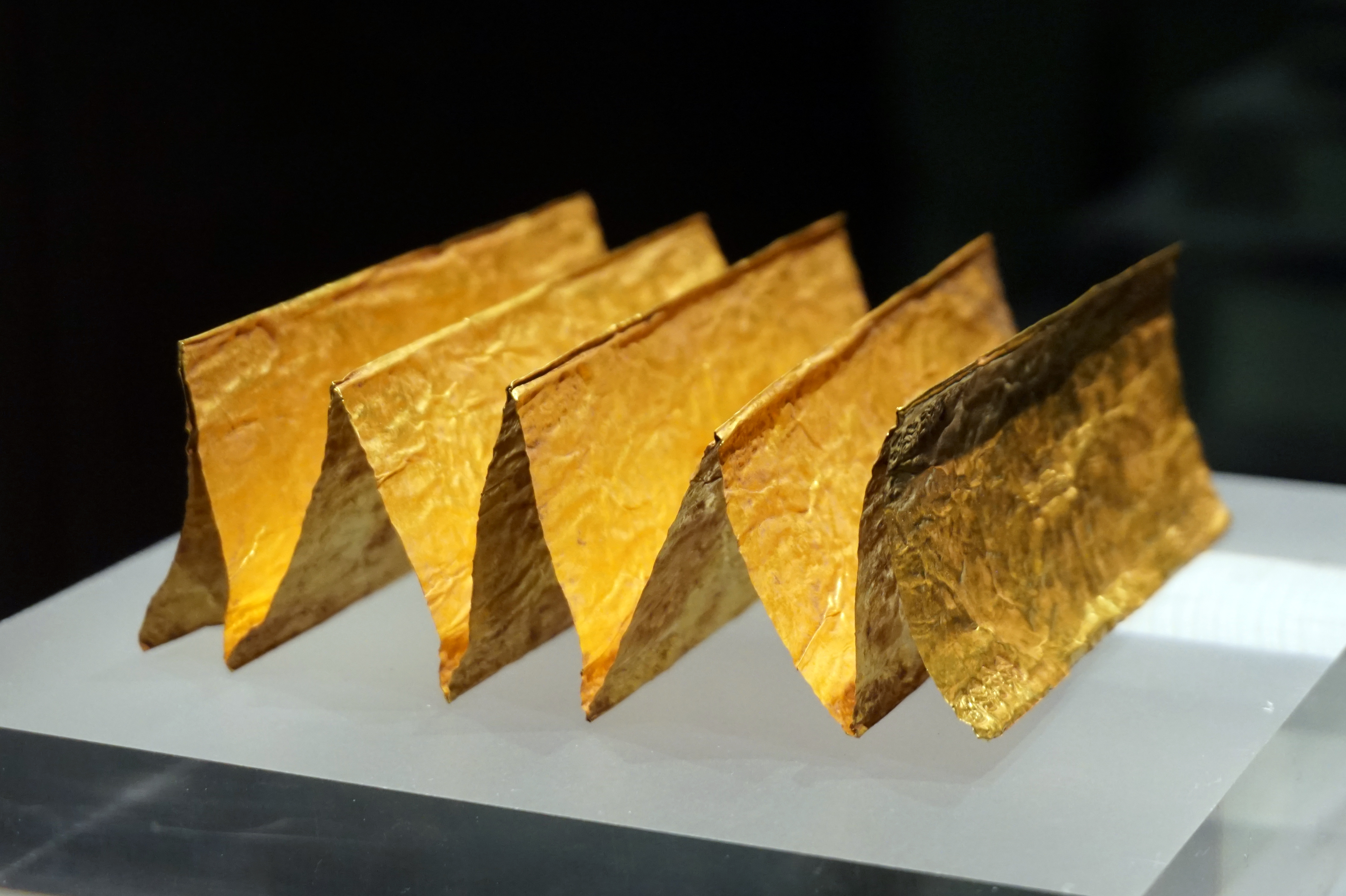
One-tael gold leaf from the Southern Song dynasty

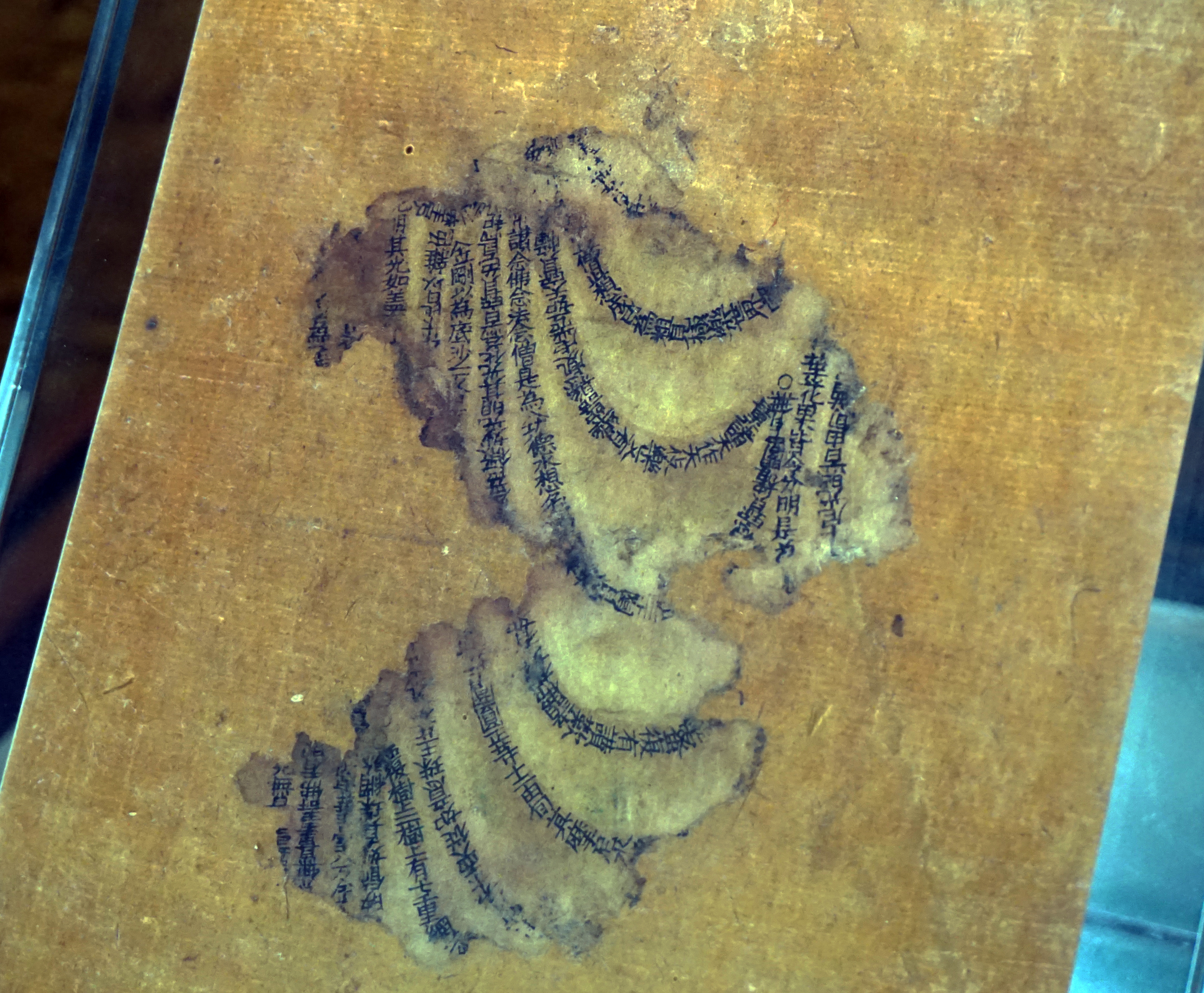
Fragment of the Amitayurdhyana Sutra printed with moveable type

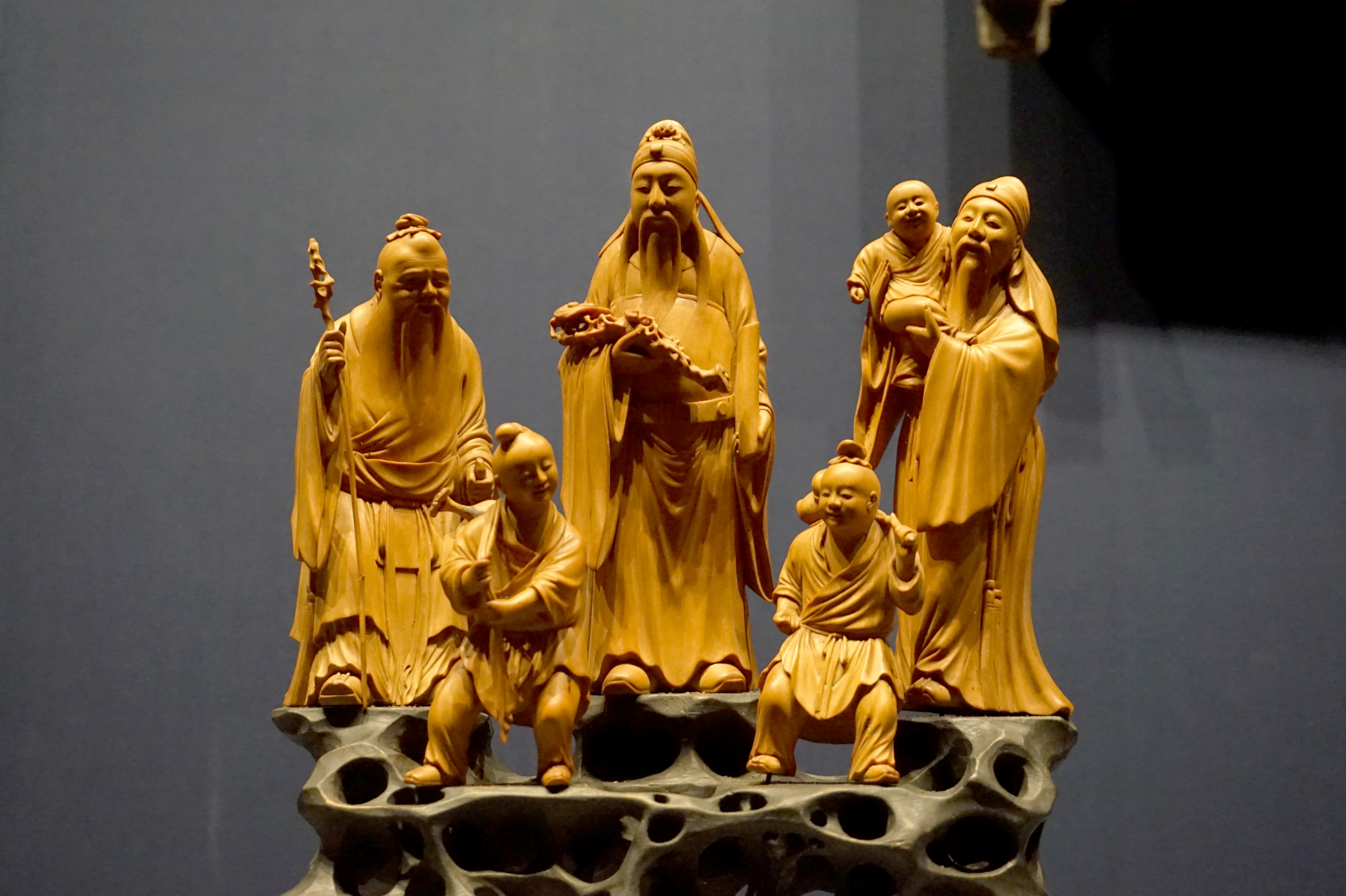
Wood carving of the Sanxing by Zhu Zichang (朱子常, Qing dynasty)
