= Jiangxinyu =

Island in Wenzhou, Zhejiang, China

江心屿
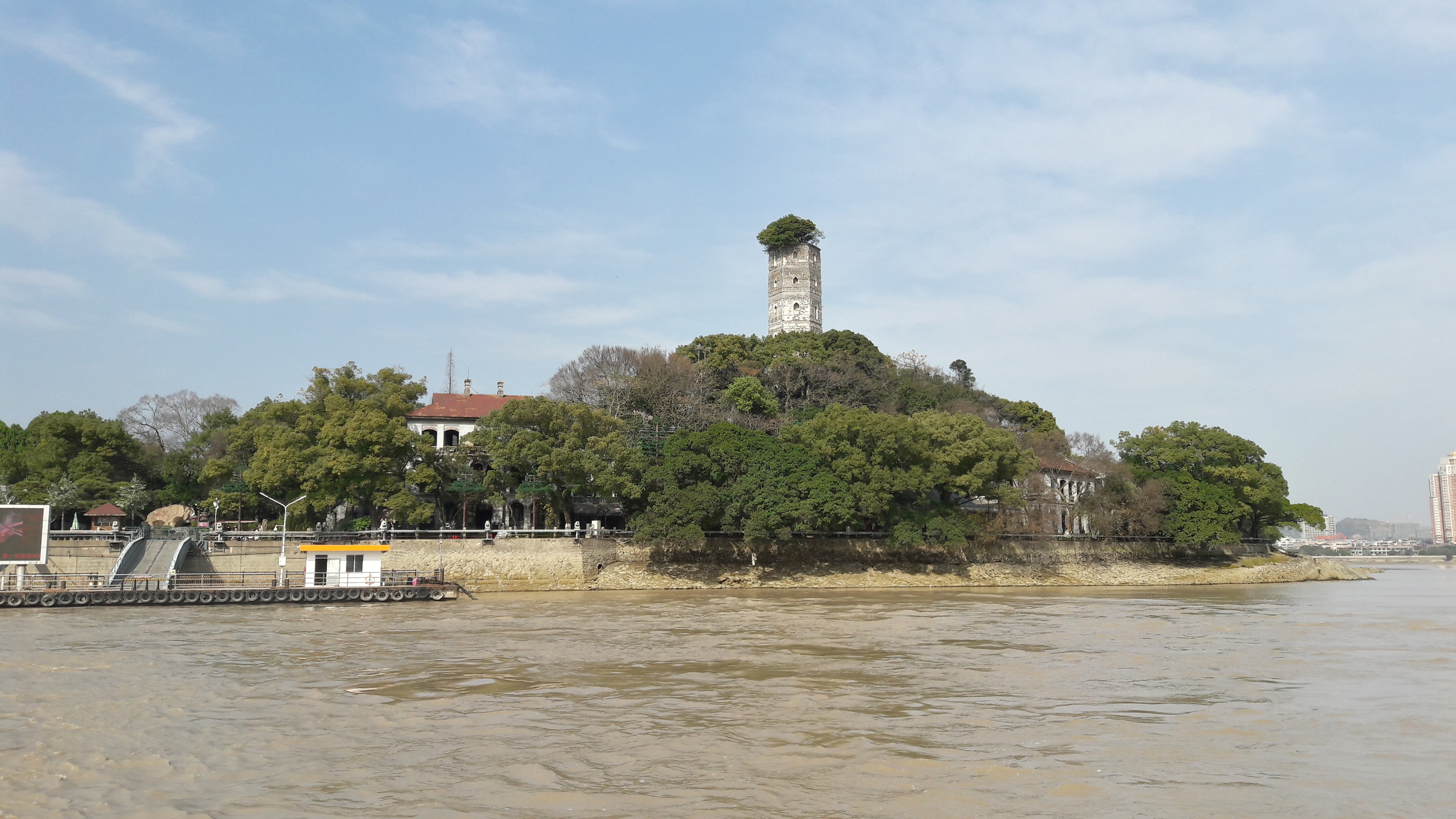
- The East Pagoda and the former British consulate

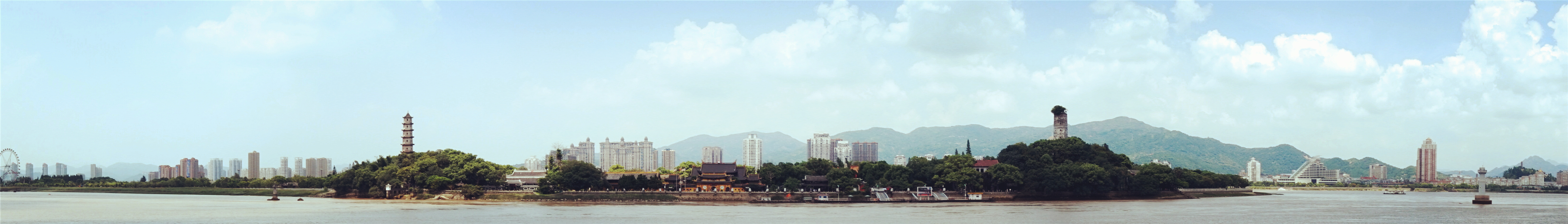
- Panorama of the Jiangxinyu
- Interactive map of Jiangxinyu
- Other names: Jiangxin Islet; Mid-river Islet; Jiangxin Island; Guyu
- Etymology: Its location in the middle of the Ou River

Geography
- Location: The Ou River in Wenzhou, Zhejiang, China
- Coordinates: 28°01′48″N 120°37′55″E
- Area: 700,000 m^{2} (7,500,000 sq ft)

Administration
- China
- Province: Zhejiang
- City: Wenzhou
- District: Lucheng

Additional information
- Postal code: 325000

The Jiangxinyu, or the Jiangxin Islet (Chinese: 江心屿; lit. 'Mid-river Islet'), formerly known as the Conquest Island, is a river island in the Ou River to the north of the city centre of Wenzhou, Zhejiang, China. Long and narrow in shape, the island measures approximately 2,800 m (9,200 ft) from east to west, with a maximum width of 400 m (1,300 ft) from north to south, and covering a total area of 70 ha (170 acres). Rich in cultural and historical heritage, the island is recognised as a landmark and symbol of Wenzhou. In 2002, the island was designated as a AAAA tourist attraction in China. It received 753,800 visitors in 2012.

== History ==
=== Jiangxin Temple ===
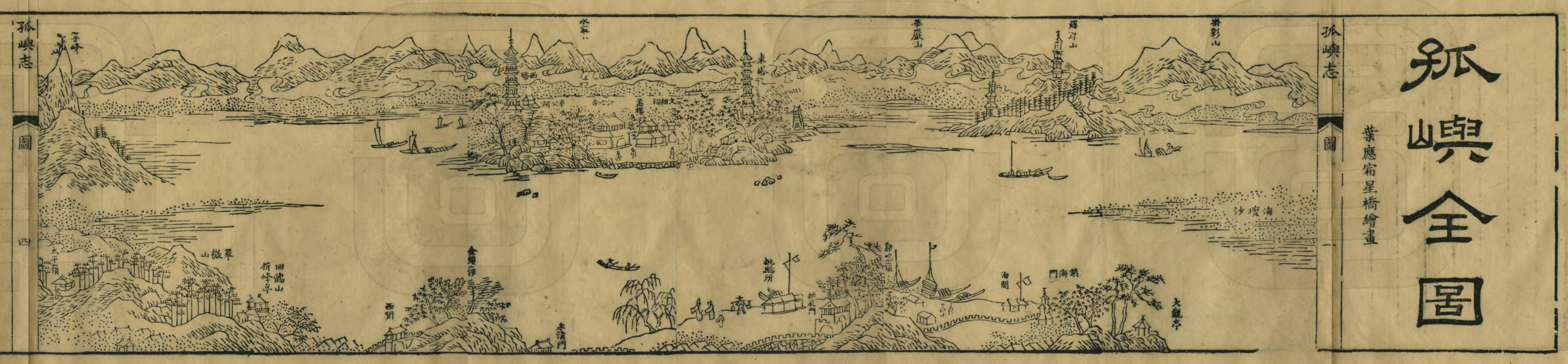
A painting of the Jiangxin Islet in 1809

The Jiangxin Islet used to consist of two islets in the Ou River, each of which was home to a Buddhist temple. The one on the western side was built in 866 as the Jingxin Chan Monastery. The one on the eastern side was built in 969 as the Pujì Chan Monastery. In the years that followed, each monastery constructed a pagoda beside its main complex. In 1137, the monk Qingliao led followers in filling the central channel between the two islets, thereby joining them into a single landmass. A temple was built on the reclaimed ground, known as Zhongchuan Temple and commonly referred to as Jiangxin Temple. Shortly afterwards, Emperor Gaozong conferred upon it the name Longxiang Xingqing Chan Temple and designated it as a ritual site for the imperial clan. Its reputation continued to grow thereafter, and by the Ming and Qing periods even monks from overseas travelled there to practise meditation and pay homage.

=== Diplomatic mission ===
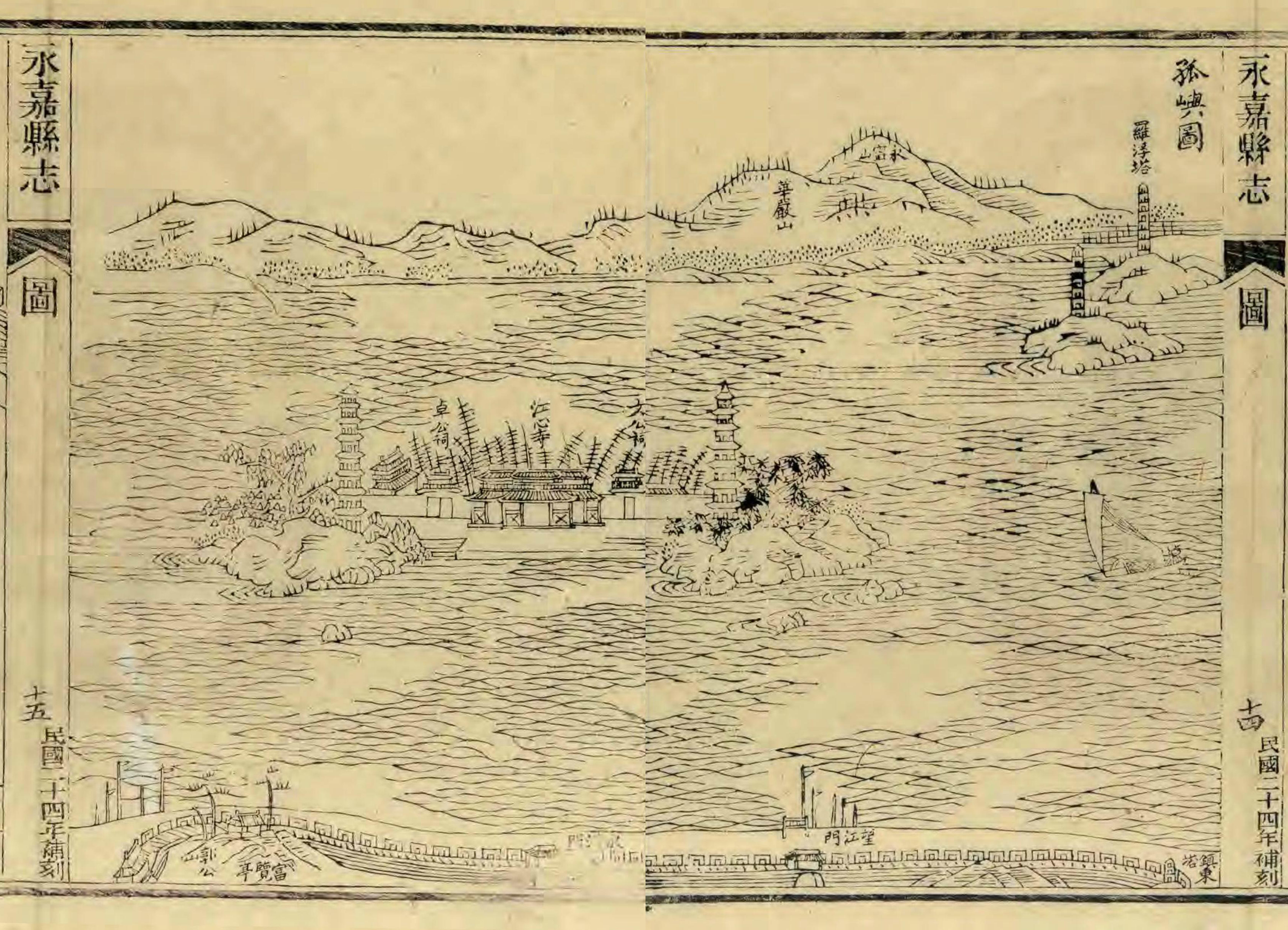
A painting of the Jiangxin Islet in 1882

In 1876, under the Chefoo Convention, Wenzhou was opened as a treaty port. In the spring of the following year, the British consul at Wenzhou, Sir Chaloner Alabaster, arrived in the city and requisitioned Haoran Pavilion within Jiangxin Temple on the Jiangxin Islet for use as the consulate premises. Owing to the limited number of foreign residents in Wenzhou, although the British and American consuls reached an agreement with the Intendant of the Wenchu local government to establish a concession, it was never put into effect in practice. In 1894, the British consul demarcated a parcel of land at the foot of the East Pagoda on the Jiangxin Islet and erected a consular residence together with a police station. The island was subsequently designated a restricted zone from which Chinese people were excluded. During this period, Buddhist scriptures and other artefacts were removed from within the East Pagoda, and the local authorities were required to dismantle its projecting eaves and surrounding galleries.

=== Dredging and expansion ===
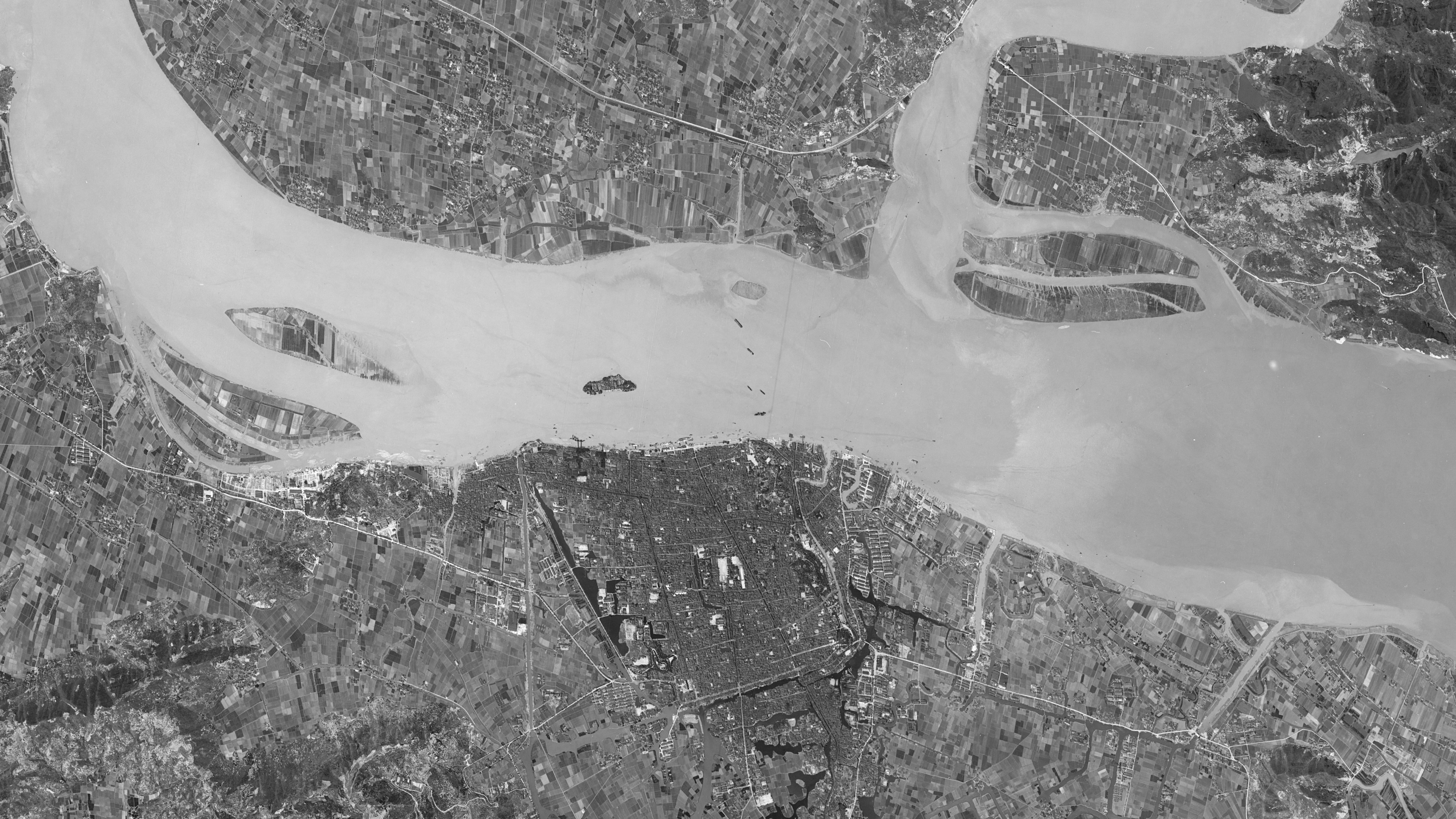
Wenzhou in 1965, with the Jiangxin Islet to the north of the city centre

By 1969, the Jiangxin Islet was still modest in scale, measuring about 480 m (1,570 ft) from east to west and 120 m (390 ft) from north to south, with an area of roughly 0.04 km^{2} (0.015 sq mi). Shoals had formed to its west, and the river channel was constrained by surrounding topography. Sediment was readily deposited, and the mid-channel bar gradually developed into a more stable island. Historically, the main current shifted between the northern and southern branches at intervals of around 15 years. In 1960, the southern branch carried 33% of the ebb-tide discharge; by the early 1970s this had fallen to 15%.

Channel regulation works were undertaken in phases during the 1970s and 1980s. In 1970, construction began on the Shangcun Dingshun Dam, 3,870 metres in length, including a 350-metre submerged section. The project redirected the principal flow from the northern to the southern branch, where the discharge ratio eventually stabilised at about 85%. Navigation depth in the Wenzhou port section of the Ou River consequently improved. As sediment accumulated along the northern side of the island, the municipal authorities initiated an expansion scheme. Works carried out in 1974 and 1979 linked newly formed shoals to the original islet. By 1979, the island had reached approximately 2,700 metres in length, with a maximum width of about 400 metres and an area of around 0.7 square kilometres, roughly eighteen times its former size. Further dredging and embankment works in 1986 enlarged the usable land area and established the present spatial arrangement. Since the 2000s, monitoring has shown persistent right-bank scouring in both channels of the Ou River adjacent to the island.

=== Tourism development ===
In 1986, Jiangxin Pier was completed, and submarine cables were laid to provide electricity, telephone connections and running water to the island. Administrative arrangements were subsequently formalised: a subdistrict office was established in 1989, and in 1992 the island's management body was renamed the Jiangxin Islet Park Administration of Lucheng District. During the mid-1990s, around two hectares of undeveloped land were landscaped with approximately CN¥3 million in private investment, introducing temporary cultural and leisure facilities. In 1998, the Wenzhou municipal government launched a CN¥38 million improvement scheme, after which the island opened at night. Further upgrades to the pier and utilities followed in 2001. That year the authorities set the objective of promoting the island as the “Island of Poetry”, and it was designated a national AAAA tourist attraction by the end of the year. In 2003, the management body was renamed the Jiangxin Islet Scenic Area Administration.

Development had previously been concentrated on the eastern side of the island. In 2001, a joint development company was formed by the municipal and district governments together with Yongjia County. The western section, approximately 1.9 km (1.2 mi) long and just over 200 m (660 ft) wide, with an area of 391,000 m^{2} (4,210,000 sq ft), was leased for tourism and resort development. Following the opening of Dong’ou Bridge in 2003, the island gained direct road access to both banks of the river. West Jiangxin Park, operated by a private company, introduced modern amusement rides and associated commercial facilities, accessible by car via the bridge but without direct public transport links. The eastern park, centred on historic sites and cultural heritage, remained under district management and was primarily reached by ferry. Differences in commercial objectives and the absence of unified planning led to overlapping functions and repeated construction.

By 2009, more than 90 per cent of visitors were from within Wenzhou, indicating limited wider appeal. A 2010 master plan proposed integrated redevelopment of the eastern and western sections, but this was not implemented owing to the existing 30-year lease and the high cost of reacquisition. In 2013, the eastern park reported a deficit exceeding CN¥2 million, and ticket prices were raised from CN¥25 to CN¥30. In 2017, the Jiangxin Seaview Hotel, completed in 2005, entered bankruptcy proceedings, reflecting both management difficulties and persistently low visitor numbers in West Jiangxin Park. In 2022, the municipal government initiated a further upgrading scheme for the western section, including the planned integration of the island's lake system and an emphasis on classical poetry as a defining cultural theme.

== Tourist attractions ==
=== Cultural heritage ===
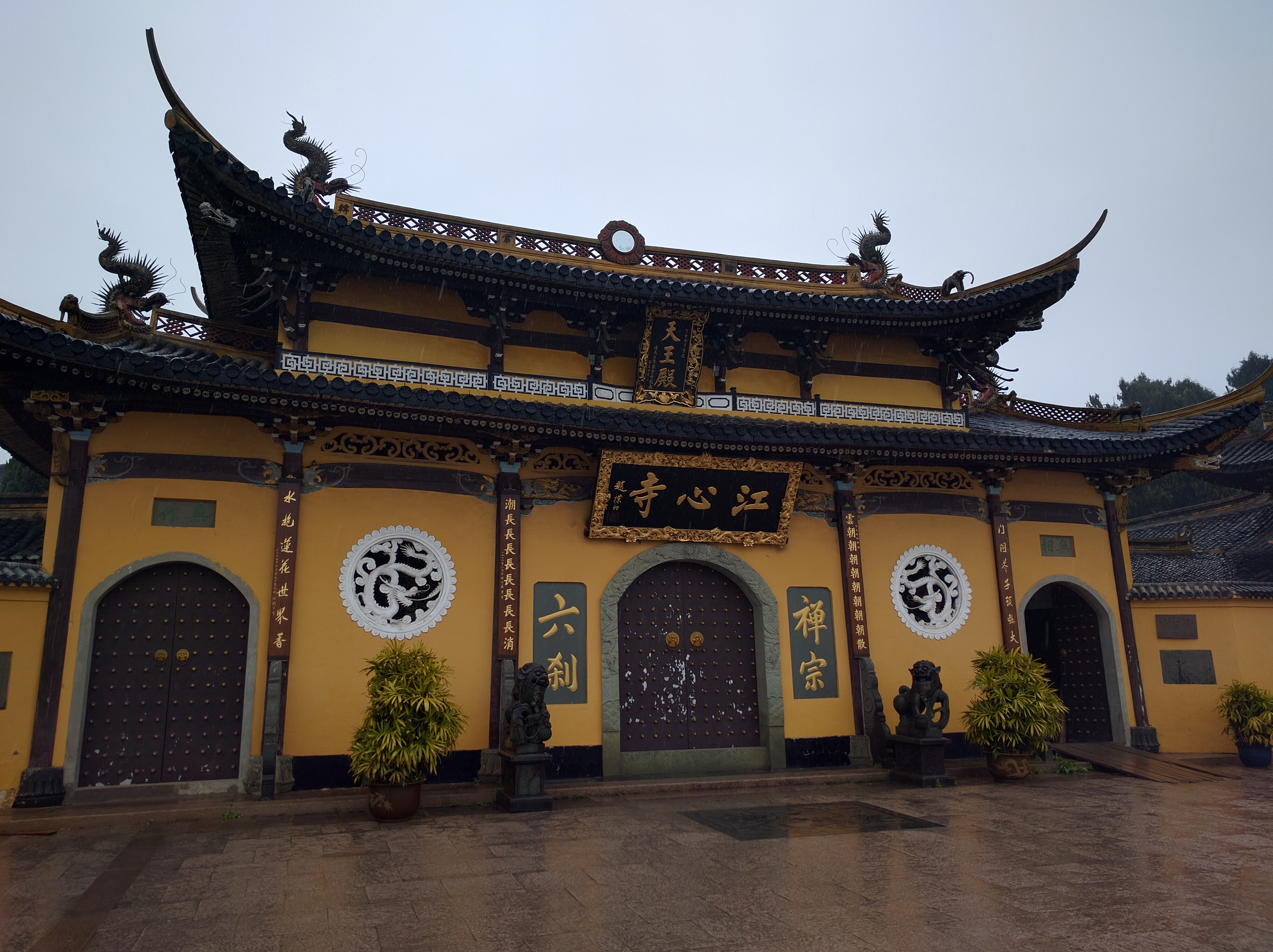
Jiangxin Temple

Jiangxin Islet was historically the site of two Buddhist temples founded in the 9th and 10th centuries respectively. In 1137, the monk Qingliao oversaw the joining of the two islets and the construction of a unified temple complex, thereafter known as Jiangxin Temple. By the 12th and 13th centuries it was regarded as one of the leading Chan monasteries in China, and it underwent several major restorations between the 14th and 17th centuries.

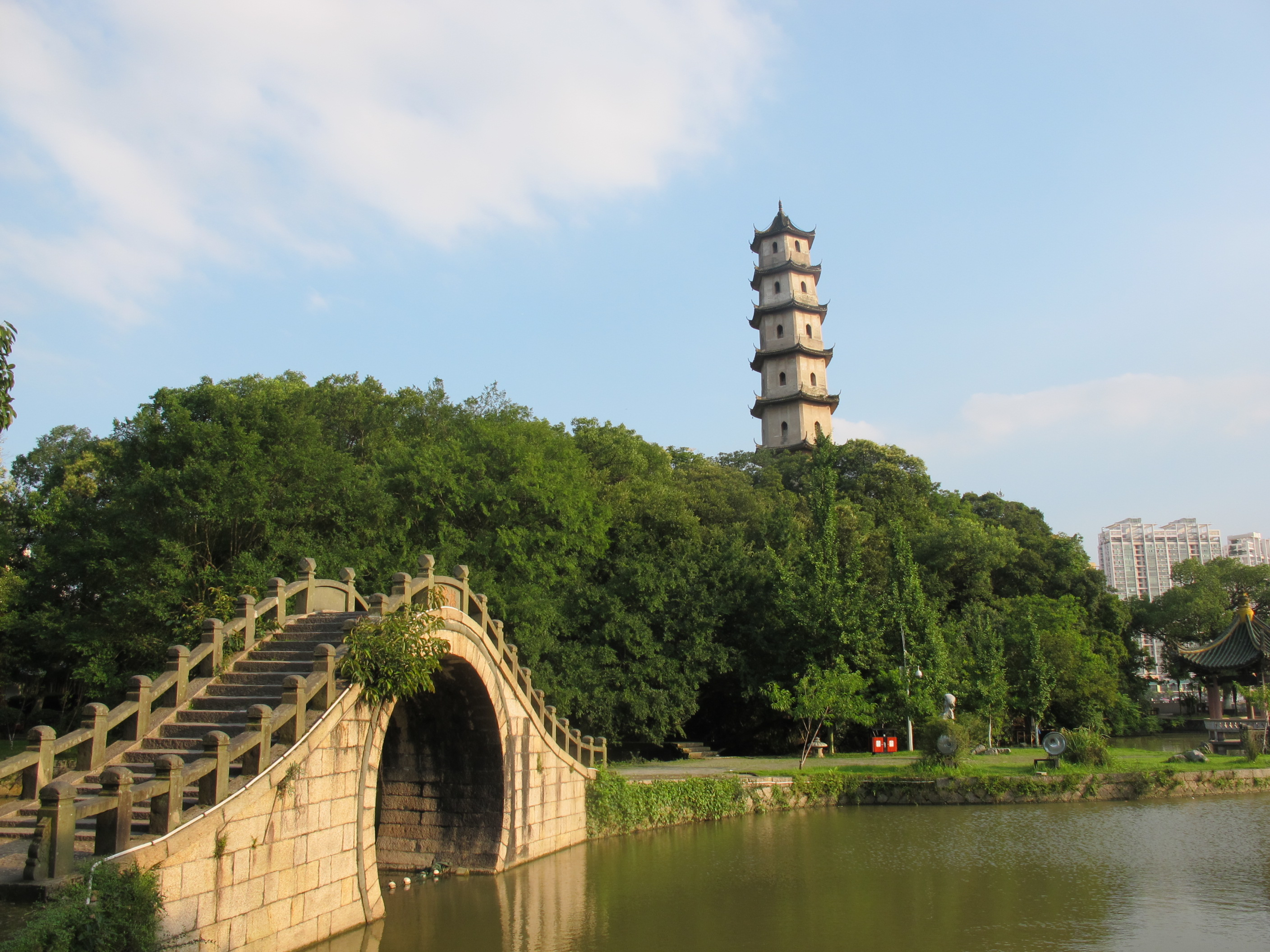
West Pagoda

The East and West Pagodas are the islet's most prominent historic structures. The East Pagoda, completed in 869, stands 32 metres high. From the 12th century until the late 19th century, lights were maintained at the tops of the pagodas to guide vessels entering and leaving the port of Wenzhou. They are now designated key cultural heritage sites under municipal protection.

The Memorial Shrine of Duke Wenxin of Song, situated to the east of Jiangxin Temple, commemorates Wen Tianxiang, who passed through Wenzhou in 1276. A shrine was erected in 1482 to mark the bicentenary of his death. Although most of its original sculptures and inscriptions have not survived, the site was restored in 1981 and now includes engraved excerpts from his poems.

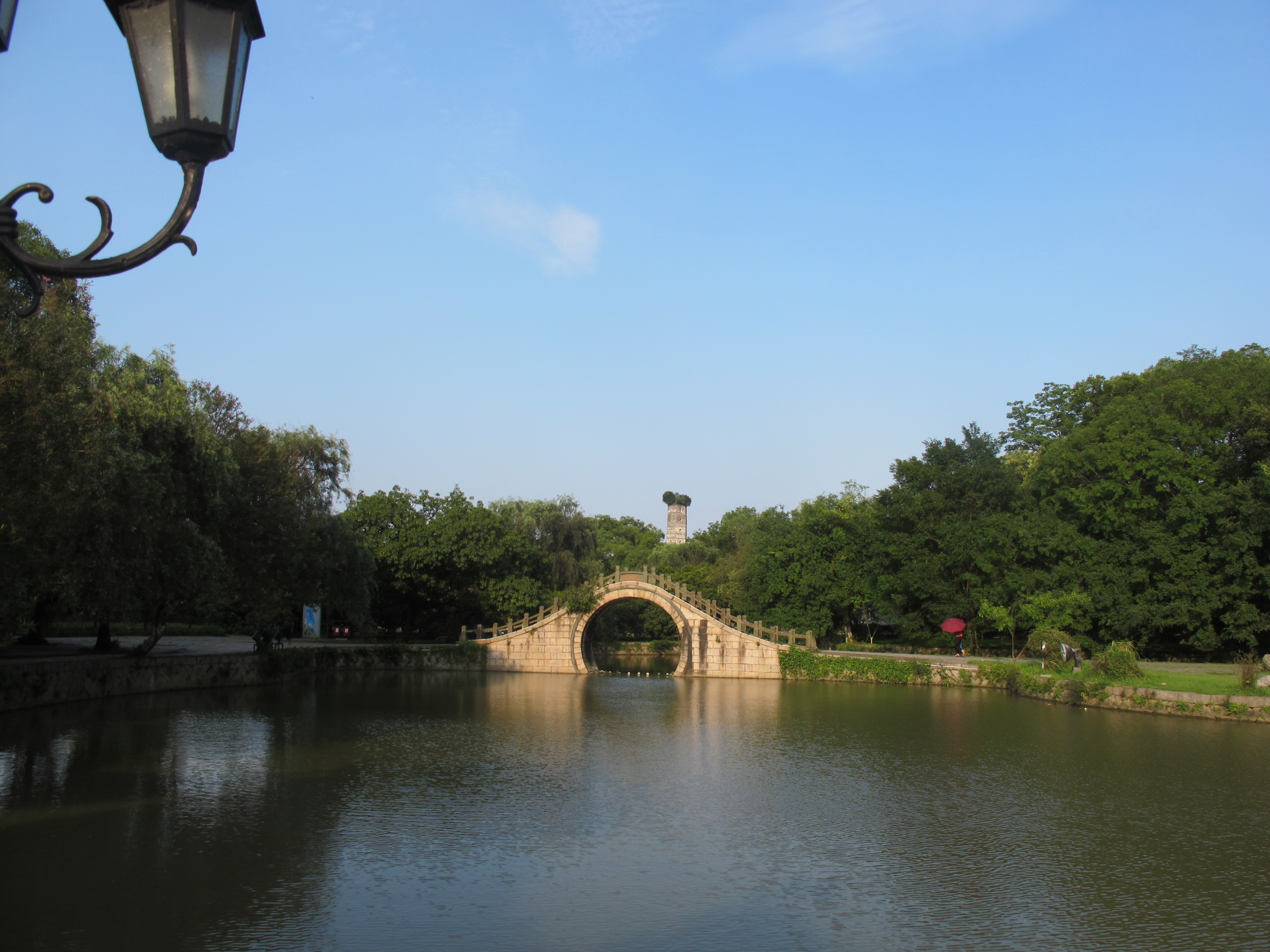
East Pagoda

The former British Consulate stands at the foot of East Pagoda Hill. After Wenzhou was opened as a treaty port in 1876, the site was selected for consular premises. A three-storey Western style building was completed in 1895, with ancillary structures added later. Following the closure of the consulate in 1924, the buildings were used for administrative purposes. The complex was listed as a provincial heritage site in 1997 and restored before reopening to the public in 2010.

Chengxian Pavilion, on the southern slope of West Pagoda Hill, is a two-storey timber structure first built in 1102 and reconstructed on several occasions between the 15th and 17th centuries. Its name derives from a phrase in a poem by Xie Lingyun. The original building had fallen into disrepair by the early 20th century. In 1919, a memorial hall dedicated to Xu Dingchao was erected on the same site, and as traces of the earlier inscription remained, the building continued to be known as Chengxian Pavilion.

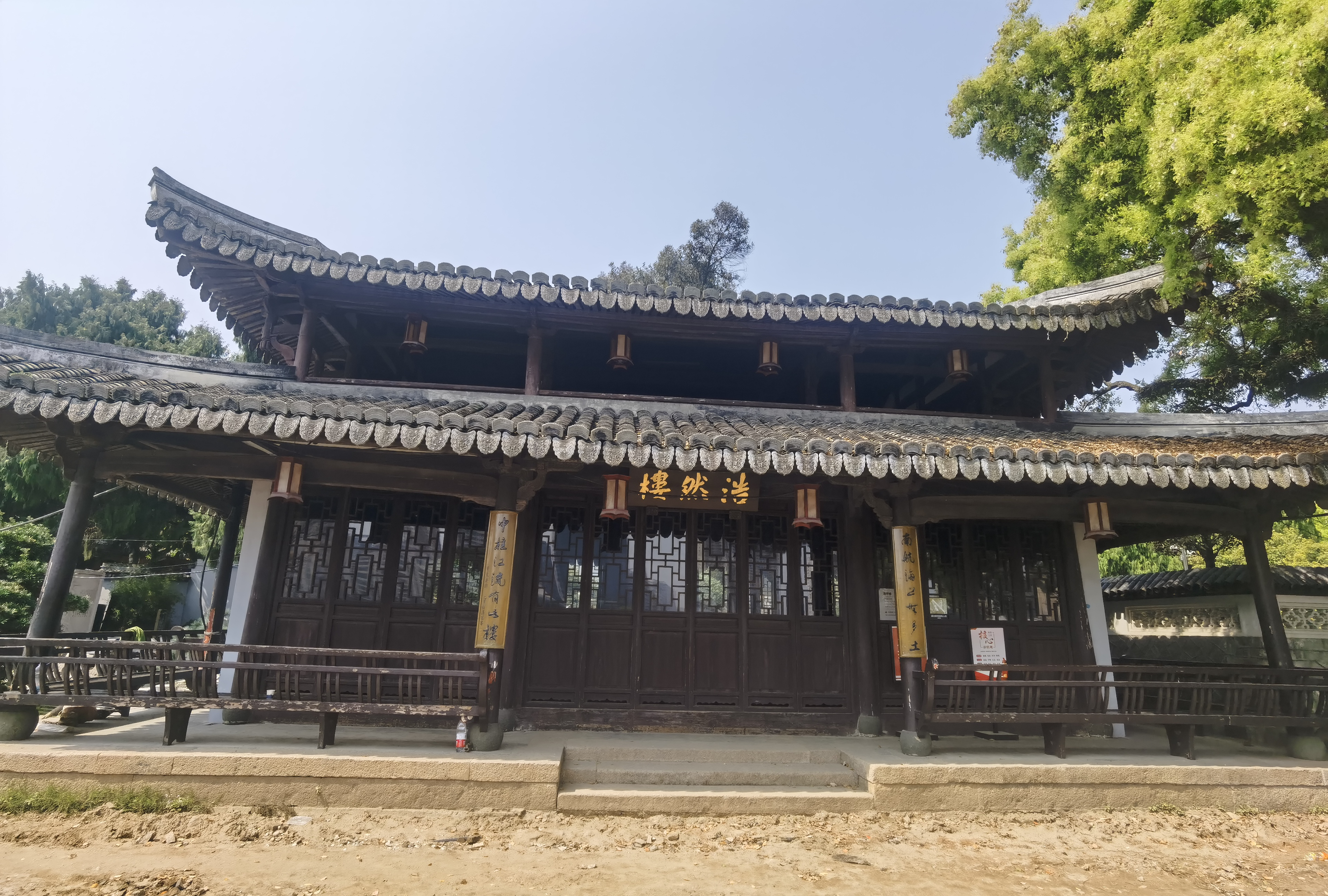
Haoran Pavilion

Haoran Pavilion, overlooking the river, was first constructed in 1580 and rebuilt in 1773 at its present location. It was included in Wenzhou's first list of protected cultural properties in 1981.

Xie Gong Pavilion, near the river on the south eastern side of West Pagoda Hill, commemorates the poet Xie Lingyun, traditionally associated with the site. The pavilion has been rebuilt several times, most recently in the 20th century, and was also designated a protected cultural property in 1981.

=== Museums ===
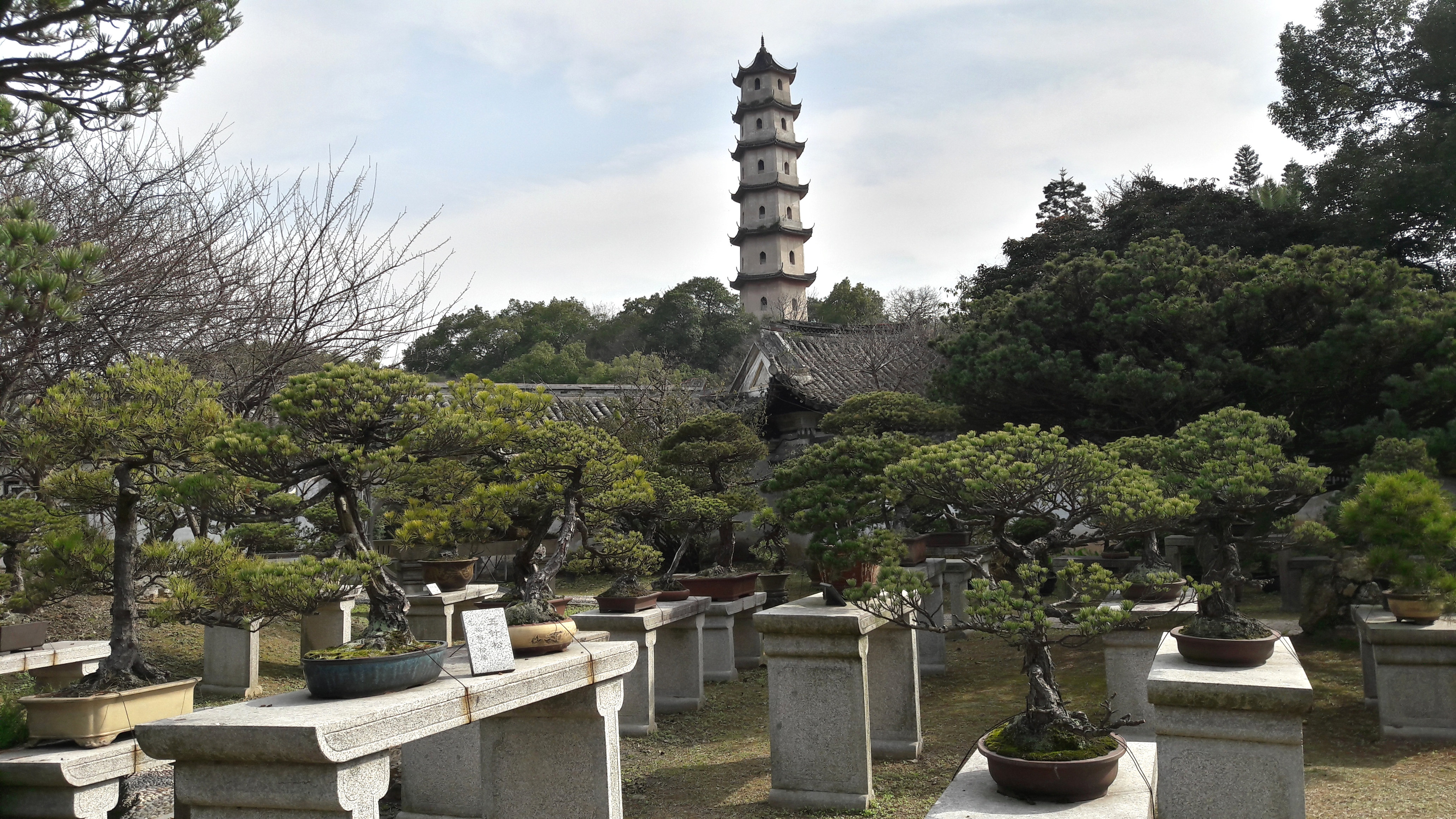
Wenzhou Bonsai Garden

Wenzhou Bonsai Garden is a specialist bonsai garden on Jiangxin Islet. Its origins lie in a small garden established in 1958 within the grounds of Miaoguo Temple. The collection gained wider recognition after participating in a national bonsai exhibition in Beijing in 1979 and the first provincial bonsai exhibition in Zhejiang in 1981. In 1987, as part of the island's expansion, a new garden was laid out on the western side and formally named Wenzhou Bonsai Garden. It now displays more than 500 bonsai specimens and forms an established element of the islet's cultural and visitor offering.

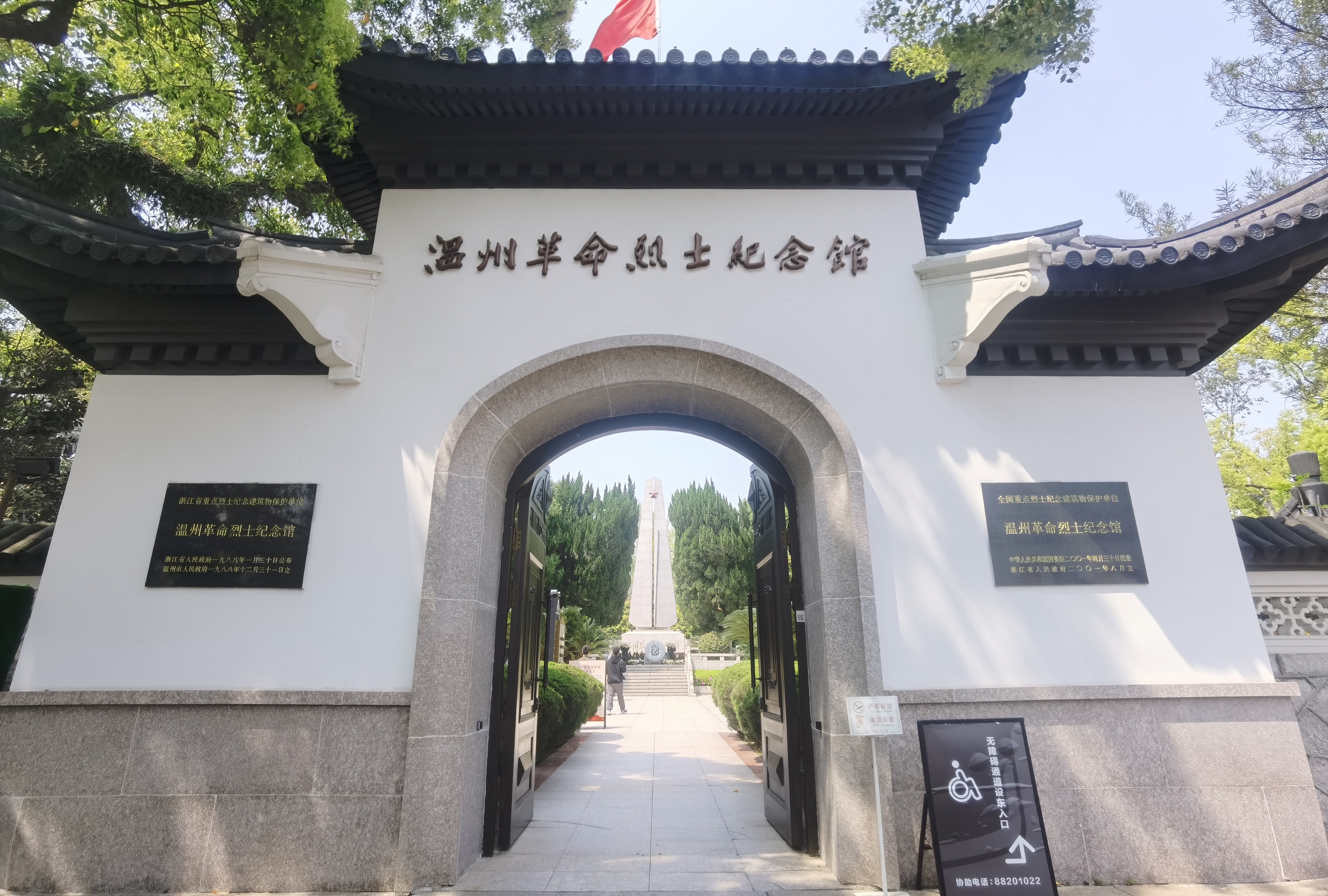
Wenzhou Memorial Hall of Revolutionary Martyrs

Wenzhou Memorial Hall of Revolutionary Martyrs stands on the former site of Longxiang Temple, first built in 969 and lost by the mid 20th century. Plans to construct a memorial on the site were approved in 1956. In 1987, the complex was enlarged to form its present layout of two memorial stelae aligned with a central exhibition building. The principal stele rises to 15 metres, and the hall itself is a two-storey structure. The exhibitions focus on modern revolutionary history in the Wenzhou region and on the lives of local martyrs. In 1988, the site was designated a key protected revolutionary memorial building at provincial level.

Wenzhou Revolutionary History Museum, opened in May 2008, occupies the refurbished premises of the former Wenzhou Museum and covers an area of 1,880 square metres. The permanent exhibition presents the history of the New Democratic Revolution in Wenzhou, organised into four chronological sections with fifteen thematic units. It displays more than 550 photographs and 208 artefacts, supported by audio visual installations and reconstructed scenes.
