= Zhang Huamei =

Afar information

- Born: 1961 (age 64–65)
- Organization(s): Huamei Costume Accessories, Wenzhou
- Known for: China’s first private business owner

Zhang Huamei (born 1961) is the first private business owner of the People's Republic of China. She became the country's first officially licensed self-employed private entrepreneur following China's reform and opening up in 1979.
